= List of Orthoptera of New Zealand =

There are 162 species of orthopterans found in New Zealand, including the wētā, with five of those species being foreign and naturalized. According to a 2022 assessment, a slim majority of species (95) were not threatened, with five species improving their conservation status and nineteen species worsening, including Deinacrida mahoenui, which was reassessed as "nationally critical".

Species (12) marked with an asterisk (*) are considered "Threatened" (including "Nationally Critical", "Nationally Endangered", and "National Vulnerable") as of 2022; species (another 12) marked with a superscript dagger (^{†}) are considered "Data Deficient" as of the same year; species (4) marked with a superscript double dagger (^{‡}) are introduced and naturalized.

== Grasshoppers and allies (Caelifera) ==
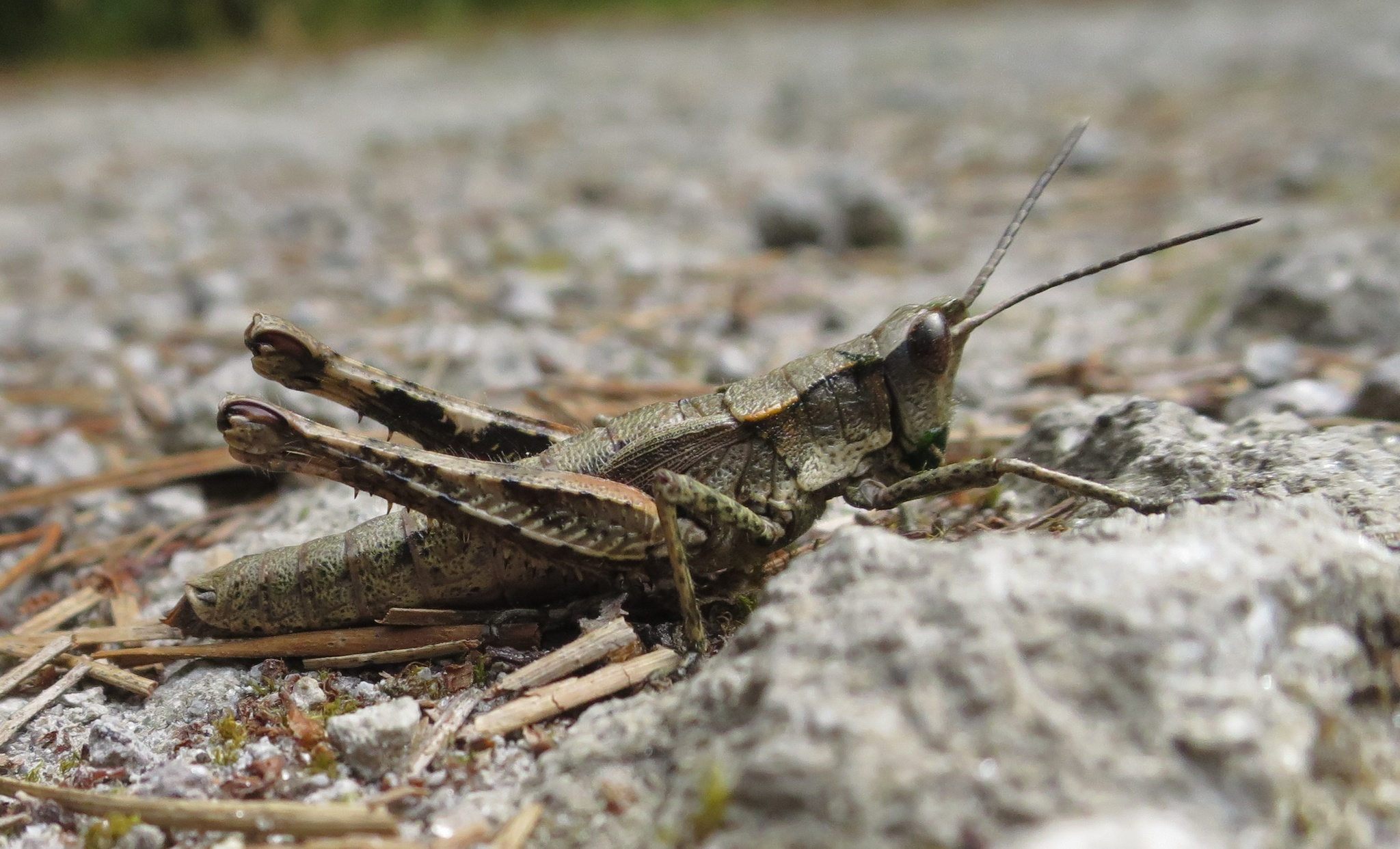
Sigaus piliferus is the type species for the genus Sigaus.

=== Short-horned grasshoppers (Acrididae) ===
- Locusta migratoria – migratory locust
- Phaulacridium marginale
- Phaulacridium otagoense
- Sigaus australis – southern alpine grasshopper
- Sigaus campestris
- Sigaus childi* – Otago arid grasshopper
- Sigaus dugdali – Dugdale's grasshopper
- Sigaus crassicauda
- Sigaus homerensis* – Homer grasshopper
- Sigaus minutus* – minute grasshopper
- Sigaus nitidus
- Sigaus nivalis – snow grasshopper
- Sigaus piliferus – North Island alpine grasshopper
- Sigaus robustus* – robust grasshopper
- Sigaus takahe^{†}
- Sigaus tumidicauda
- Sigaus villosus – hairy mountain top grasshopper

== Wētā (some Ensifera) ==
=== Giant wētā family (Anostostomatidae) ===
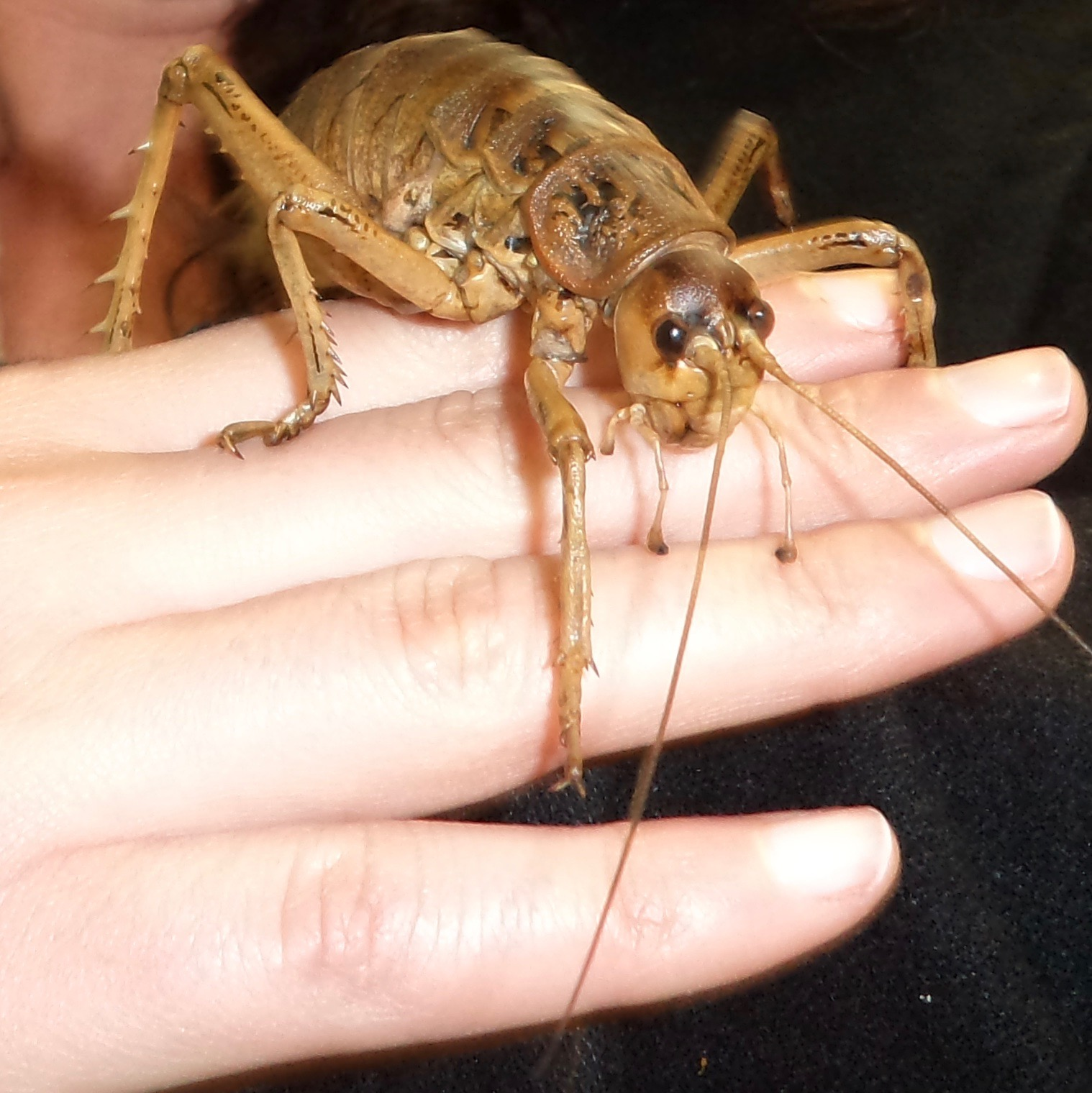
Deinacrida rugosa on a human hand for scale

==== Giant wētā (Deinacrida) ====
- Deinacrida carinata* – Herekōpare wētā
- Deinacrida connectens – scree weta
- Deinacrida elegans* – mountain bluff wētā
- Deinacrida fallai – Poor Knights giant wētā
- Deinacrida heteracantha* – wētāpunga
- Deinacrida mahoenui* - Mahoenui giant wētā
- Deinacrida parva* – Kaikōura giant wētā
- Deinacrida pluvialis*
- Deinacrida rugosa* – Cook Strait giant wētā
- Deinacrida talpa* – giant mole wētā
- Deinacrida tibiospina* – Mt Arthur giant wētā
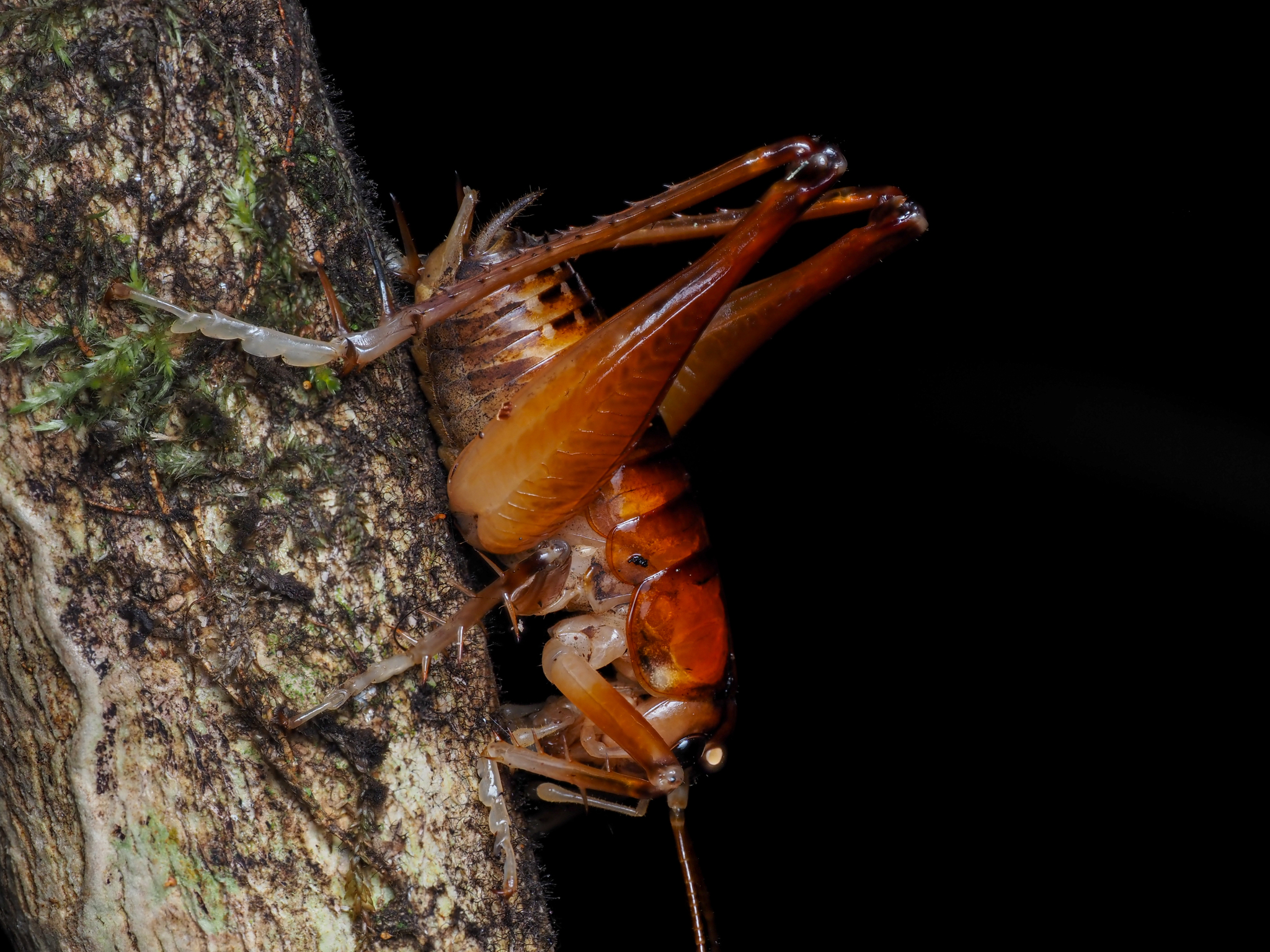
  Hemiandrus jacinda was named after Jacinda Ardern.

===== Ground wētā (Anderus and Hemiandrus) =====
- Anderus brucei – Bruce's ground wētā
- Anderus maculifrons
- Anderus nox
- Anderus subantarcticus
- Anderus fiordensis
- Hemiandrus bilobatus – two-lobed ground wētā
- Hemiandrus celaeno
- Hemiandrus electra – Kahurangi ground wētā
- Hemiandrus focalis
- Hemiandrus jacinda – Jacinda's wētā
- Hemiandrus lanceolatus^{†}
- Hemiandrus luna
- Hemiandrus maia
- Hemiandrus merope – Kapiti ground wētā
- Hemiandrus nitaweta
- Hemiandrus pallitarsis
- Hemiandrus sterope
- Hemiandrus superbus

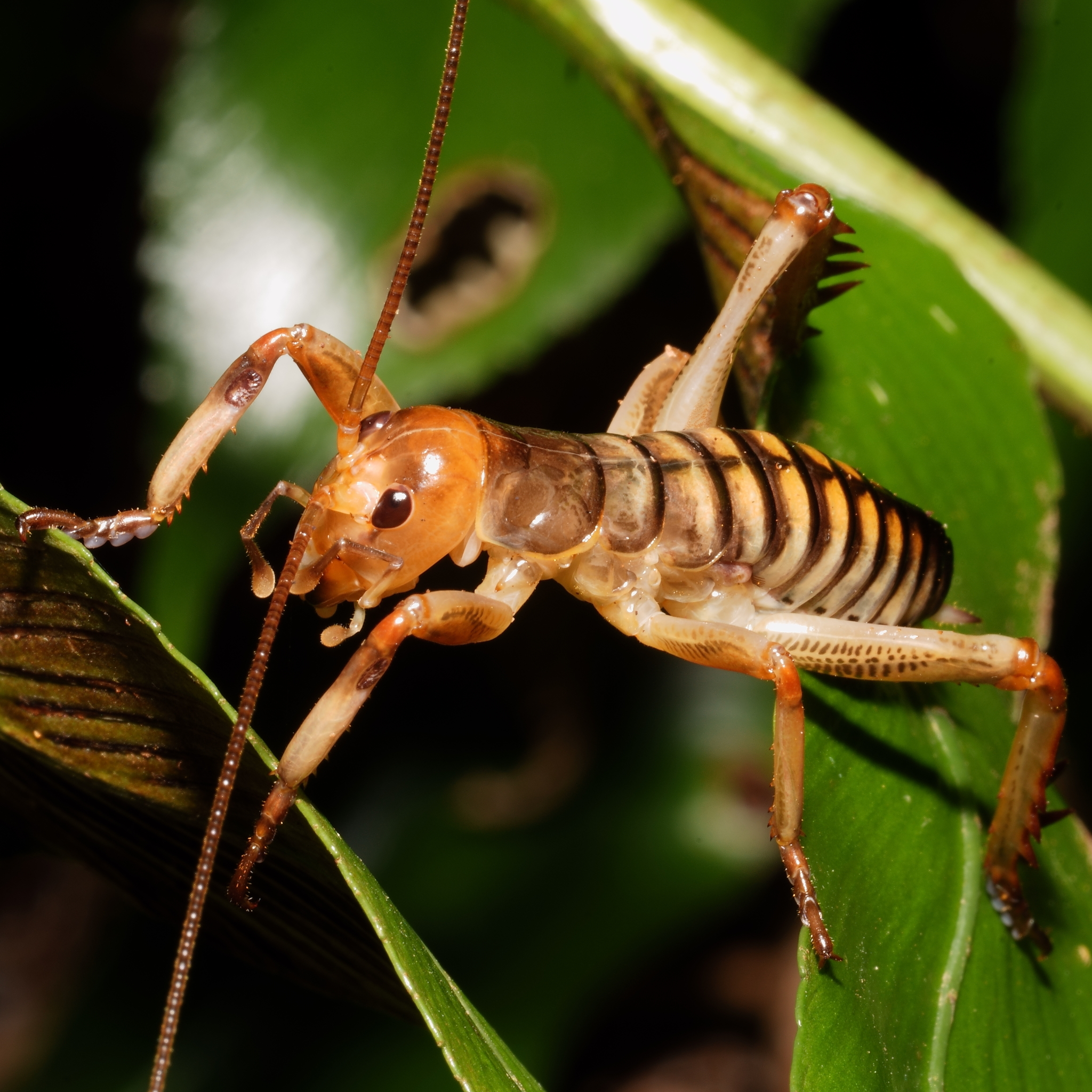
Hemideina crassidens is not threatened.

===== Tree wētā (Hemideina) =====
- Hemideina broughi – West Coast bush wētā
- Hemideina crassidens – Wellington tree wētā
- Hemideina femorata – Canterbury tree wētā
- Hemideina maori – mountain stone wētā
- Hemideina ricta – Banks Peninsula tree wētā
- Hemideina thoracica – Auckland tree wētā
- Hemideina trewicki – Hawke's Bay tree wētā

===== Tusked wētā =====
- Anisoura nicobarica – Northland tusked wētā
- Motuweta isolata – Mercury Island tusked wētā
- Motuweta riparia – Raukūmara tusked wētā

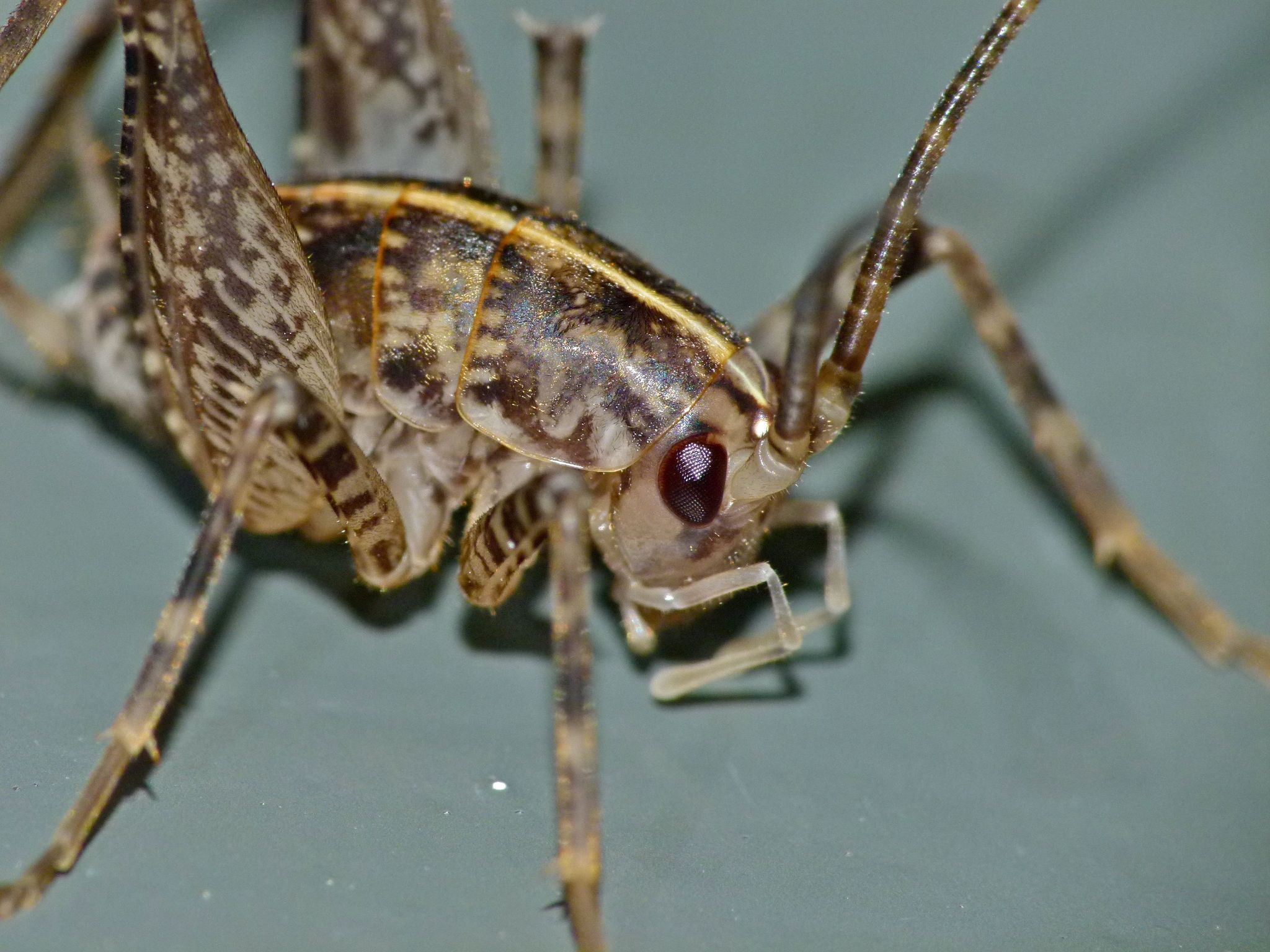
Pleioplectron simplex is a cave wētā found on the South Island.

=== Cave wētā family (Rhaphidophoridae) ===
- Dendroplectron aucklandense – Auckland Island cave wētā
- Insulanoplectron spinosum – Snares Island wētā
- Ischyroplectron isolatum – Bounty Island wētā
- Isoplectron armatum
- Isoplectron calcaratum
- Macropathus filifer
- Macropathus huttoni
- Maotoweta virescens – green moss wētā
- Miotopus diversus
- Miotopus richardsi – Aola Richards' cave wētā
- Neonetus huttoni^{†}
- Neonetus pilosus
- Neonetus variegatus
- Notoplectron campbellense – Campbell Island cave wētā
- Novoplectron serratum
- Pachyrhamma delli
- Pachyrhamma giganteum^{†}
- Pachyrhamma unicolor^{†}
- Pallidoplectron peniculosum
- Pallidoplectron subterraneum
- Pallidoplectron turneri
- Paraneonetus multispinus^{†}
- Petrotettix cupolaensis
- Petrotettix nigripes
- Petrotettix serratus
- Petrotettix spinosus
- Pharmacus cochleatus
- Pharmacus concinnus – elegant sorcerer alpine cave wētā
- Pharmacus cristatus – tufted sorcerer alpine cave wētā
- Pharmacus montanus – Mount Cook flea
- Pharmacus notabilis – Remarkables alpine cave wētā
- Pharmacus perfidus – Takitimu sorcerer alpine cave wētā
- Pharmacus senex – old sorcerer alpine cave wētā
- Pharmacus vallestris^{†}
- Pleioplectron auratum – gold-haired cave wētā
- Pleioplectron caudatum
- Pleioplectron crystallae
- Pleioplectron flavicorne
- Pleioplectron gubernator
- Pleioplectron hudsoni – Hudson’s cave wētā
- Pleioplectron rodmorrisi – Rod Morris’ cave wētā
- Pleioplectron simplex
- Pleioplectron thomsoni – Thomson's cave wētā
- Pleioplectron triquetrum
- Setascutum ohauense
- Setascutum pallidum
- Talitropsis chopardi
- Talitropsis crassicruris
- Talitropsis irregularis^{†}
- Talitropsis megatibia
- Talitropsis poduroides
- Talitropsis sedilloti

== Crickets and allies (other Ensifera) ==
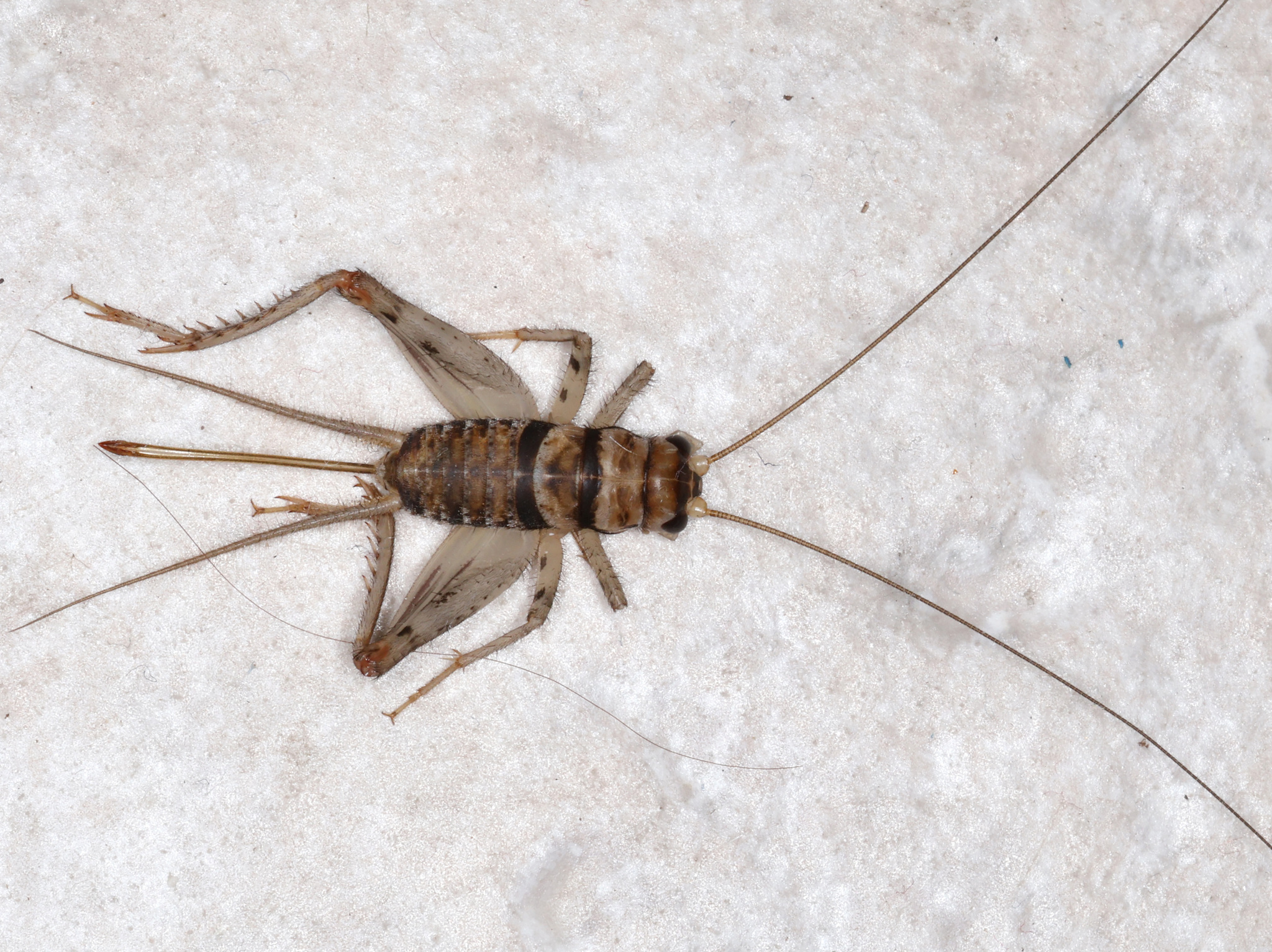
The tropical house cricket is introduced and naturalized to New Zealand.

=== True crickets (Gryllidae) ===
- Gryllodes sigillatus^{‡} – tropical house cricket
- Gryllopsis maoria^{†}
- Lepidogryllus parvulus^{‡} – fast-chirping field cricket
- Teleogryllus commodus^{†}

=== Mole crickets (Gryllotalpidae) ===
- Trimescaptor aotea^{†}

=== Scaly crickets (Mogoplistidae) ===
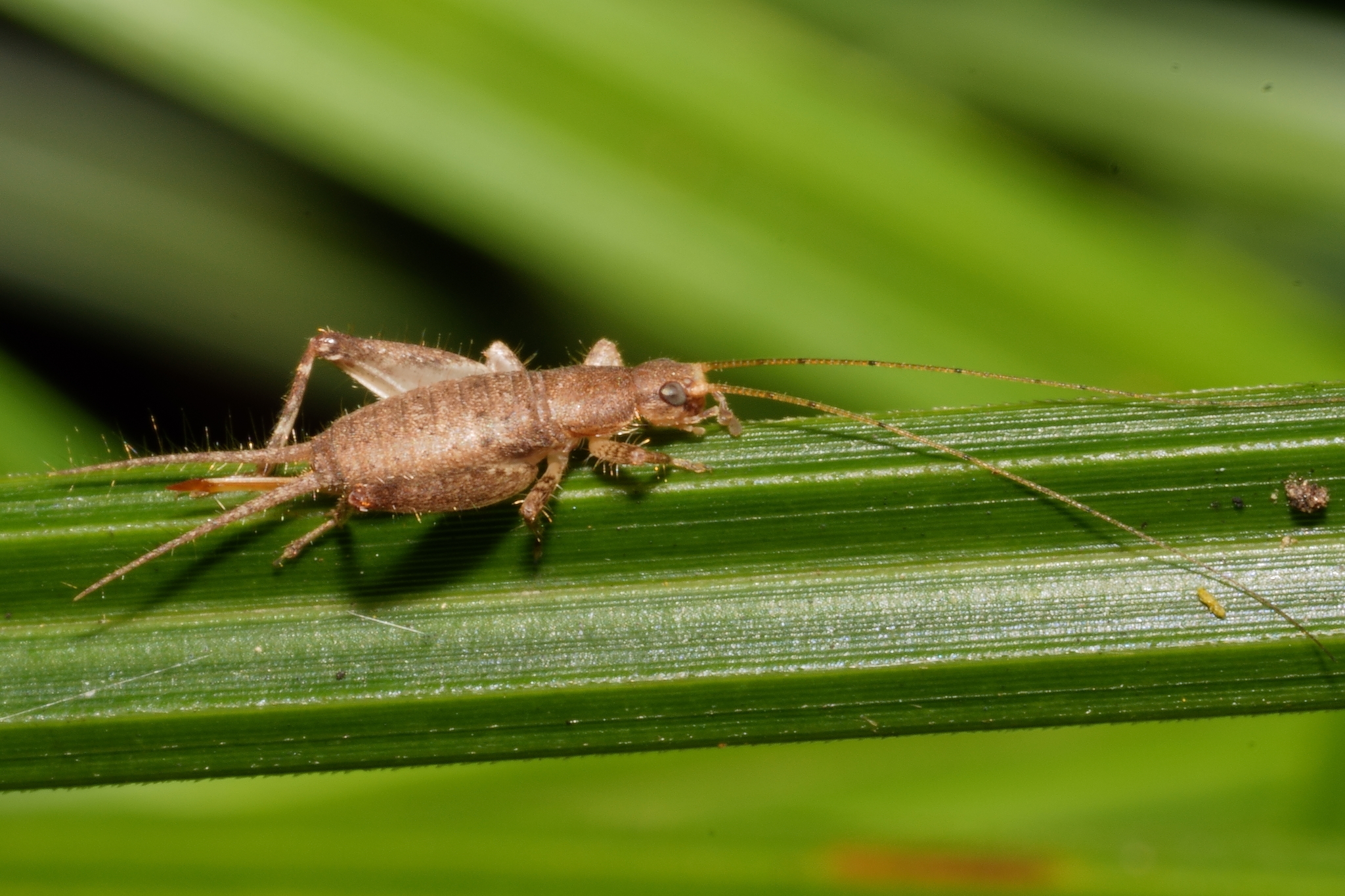
Ornebius aperta is the only scaly cricket found in New Zealand.

- Ornebius aperta

=== Wood crickets (Nemobiinae) ===
- Bobilla bigelowi – small field cricket
- Bobilla nigrova – field cricket
- Metioche maorica – ground cricket

=== Katydids (Tettigoniidae) ===
- Austrosalomona falcata^{‡} – olive-green coastal katydid
- Caedicia simplex – garden katydid
- Conocephalus albescens
- Conocephalus bilineatus
- Conocephalus semivitatus
- Salomona solida^{†}

== Bibliography ==
- Steve Trewick, Danilo Hegg, Mary Morgan-Richards, Tara Murray, Corinne Watts, Peter Johns and Pascale Michel (2022). Conservation status of Orthoptera (wētā, crickets and grasshoppers) in Aotearoa New Zealand. Department of Conservation / Te Papa Atawhai. ISBN 978-1-99-118364-4. This article incorporates text from this source, which is available under the CC BY 4.0 license.
