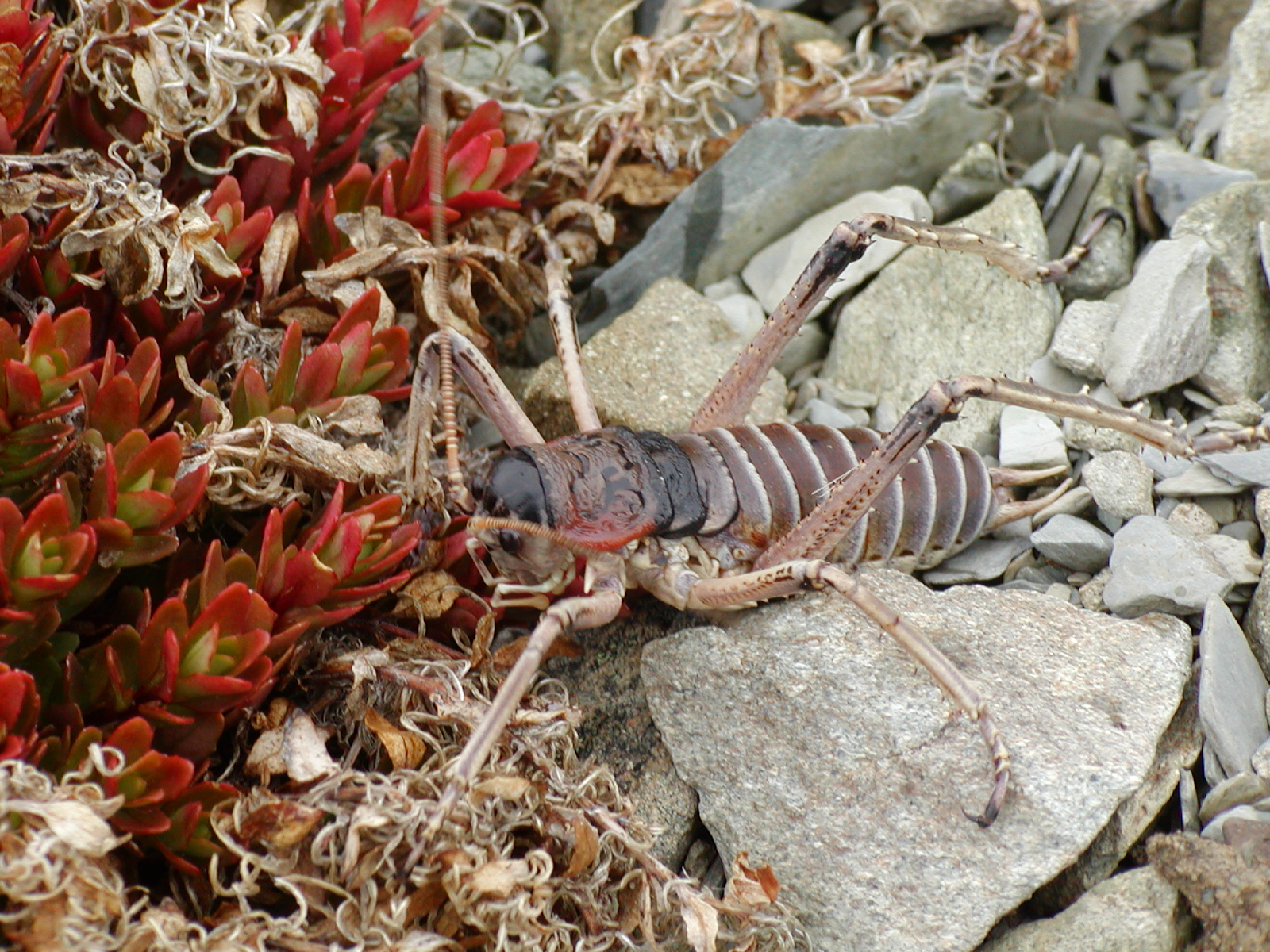
- Adult male Deinacrida connectens with relatively long hind legs and narrow body
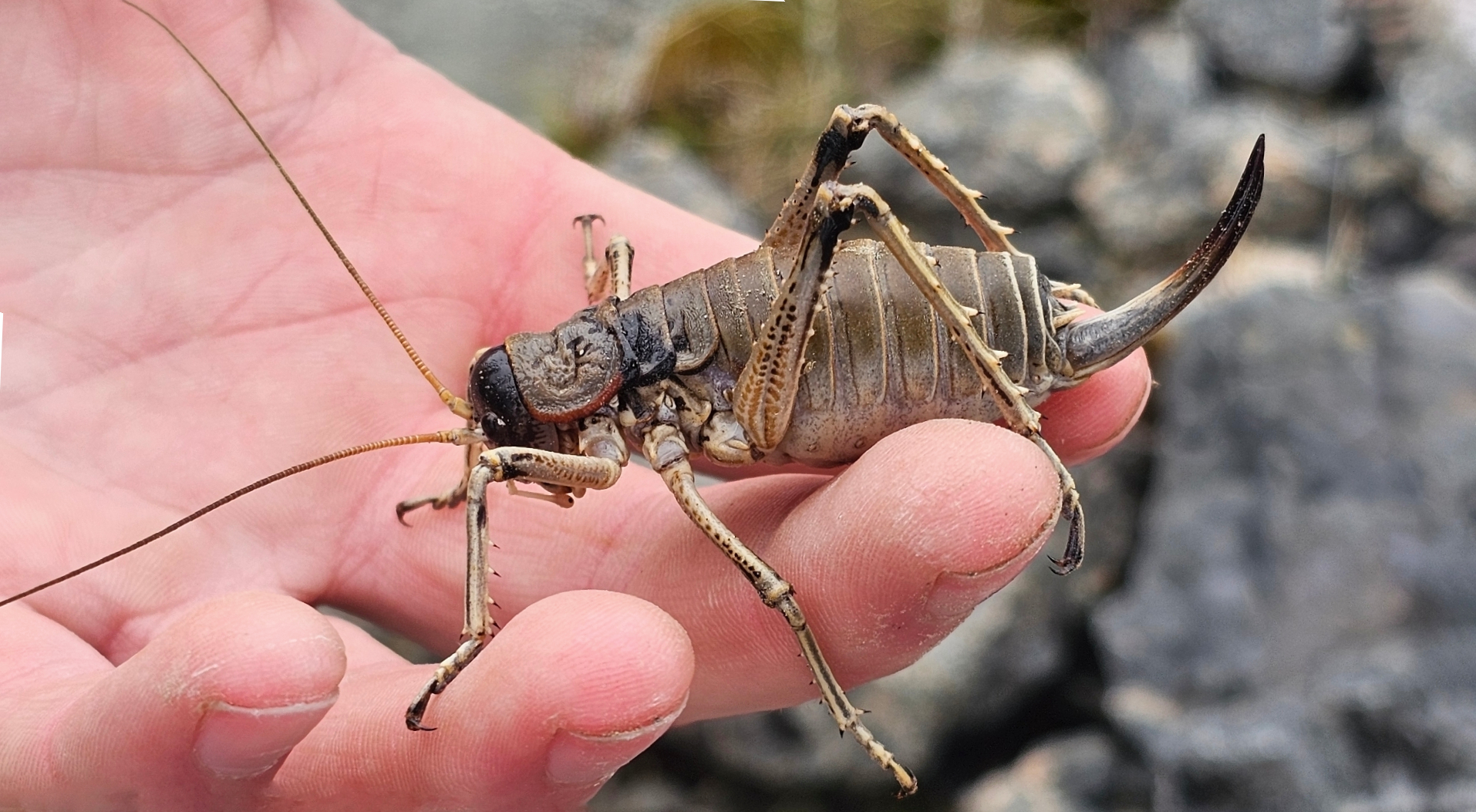
- Adult female D. connectens

Conservation status
- Not Threatened (NZ TCS)

Scientific classification
- Kingdom: Animalia
- Phylum: Arthropoda
- Clade: Pancrustacea
- Class: Insecta
- Order: Orthoptera
- Suborder: Ensifera
- Family: Anostostomatidae
- Genus: Deinacrida
- Species: D. connectens

Binomial name
- Deinacrida connectens (Ander, 1939)
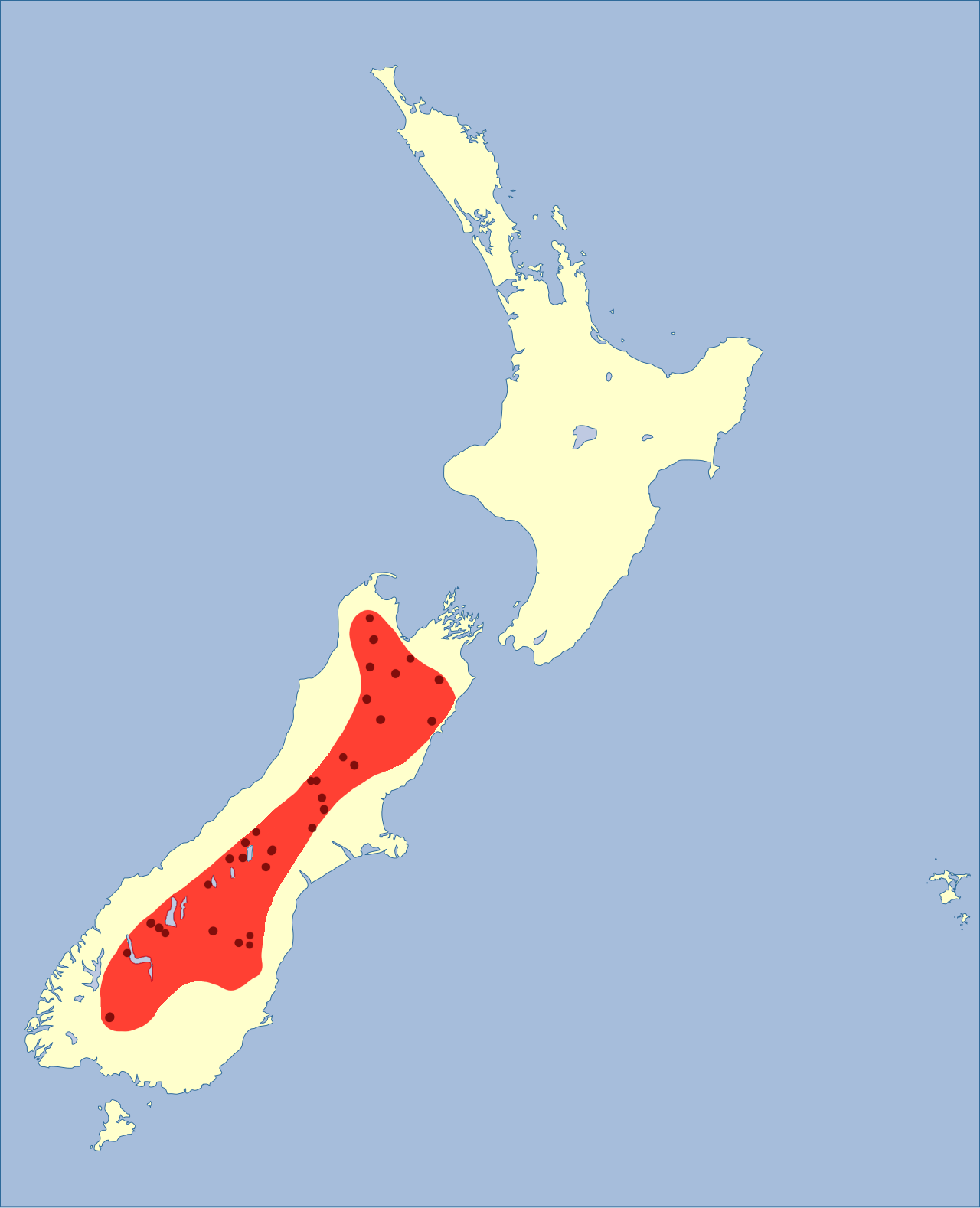
- Distribution map

Synonyms
- Deinacridopsis connectens Ander, 1939; Deinacrida sonitospina Salmon, 1950

= Deinacrida connectens =

Alpine scree wētā

Species of orthopteran insect

Deinacrida connectens, often referred to as the alpine scree wētā, is a member of the Anostostomatidae family. It is nocturnal and lives under rocks between 1,200 m (3,900 ft) and 3,600 m (11,800 ft) above sea level in the South Island. The male can reach up to 3.5 cm (1.4 in) in length, whereas the female can be 7.2 cm (2.8 in), with both sexes varying substantially in colour. It is the most widespread of the eleven species of giant wētā (Deinacrida), but unlike most other giant wētā, is not a threatened species under the New Zealand Threat Classification System. It is an omnivore that feeds on plants such as Aciphylla and Gaultheria depressa. To survive the alpine environment, it is moderately freeze tolerant. The genetic structure of the species suggests that it diversified during the Pliocene mountain building that created the Southern Alps four million years ago. It was first described in scientific literature in 1939 by Swedish entomologist Kjell Ernst Viktor Ander.

== Taxonomy ==
Deinacrida connectens, commonly referred to as the alpine scree wētā, was first described scientific literature in 1939 by Swedish entomologist Kjell Ernst Viktor Ander as Deinacridopsis connectens, which was the only species of Deinacridopsis. However, Deinacridopsis was later recognized to be the same as the genus Deinacrida by New Zealand entomologist Graeme William Ramsay in 1961 and the species was transferred to the genus Deinacrida. In the same paper, Ramsay also recognized Deinacrida sonitospina as a synonym of D. connectens, which was previously described by New Zealand entomologist John Salmon in 1950 from specimens found at Mount Peel and Mount Arthur. The type specimens (the specimens the species description is based on) are stored in the Museum für Naturkunde Berlin.

== Description ==
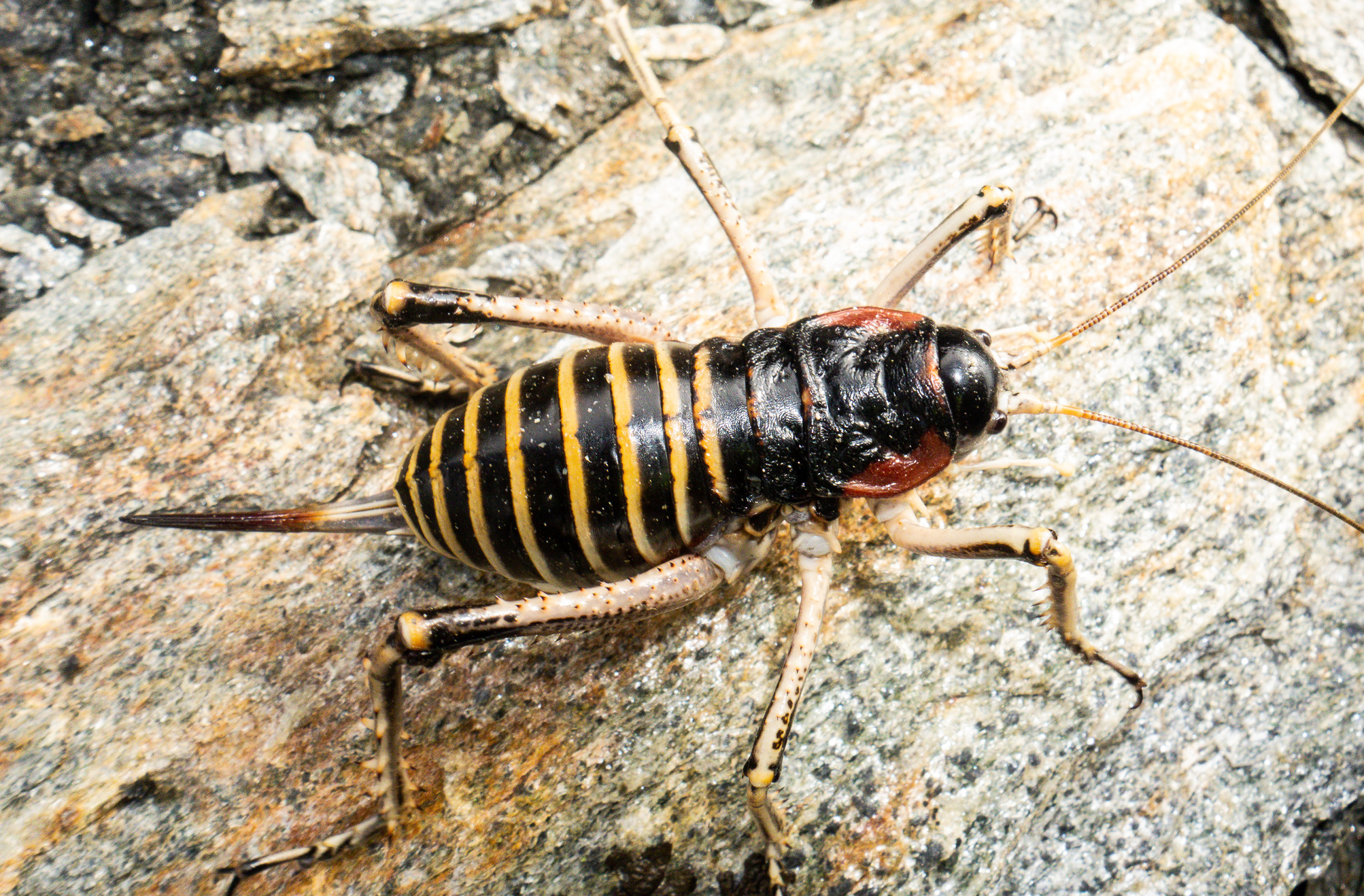
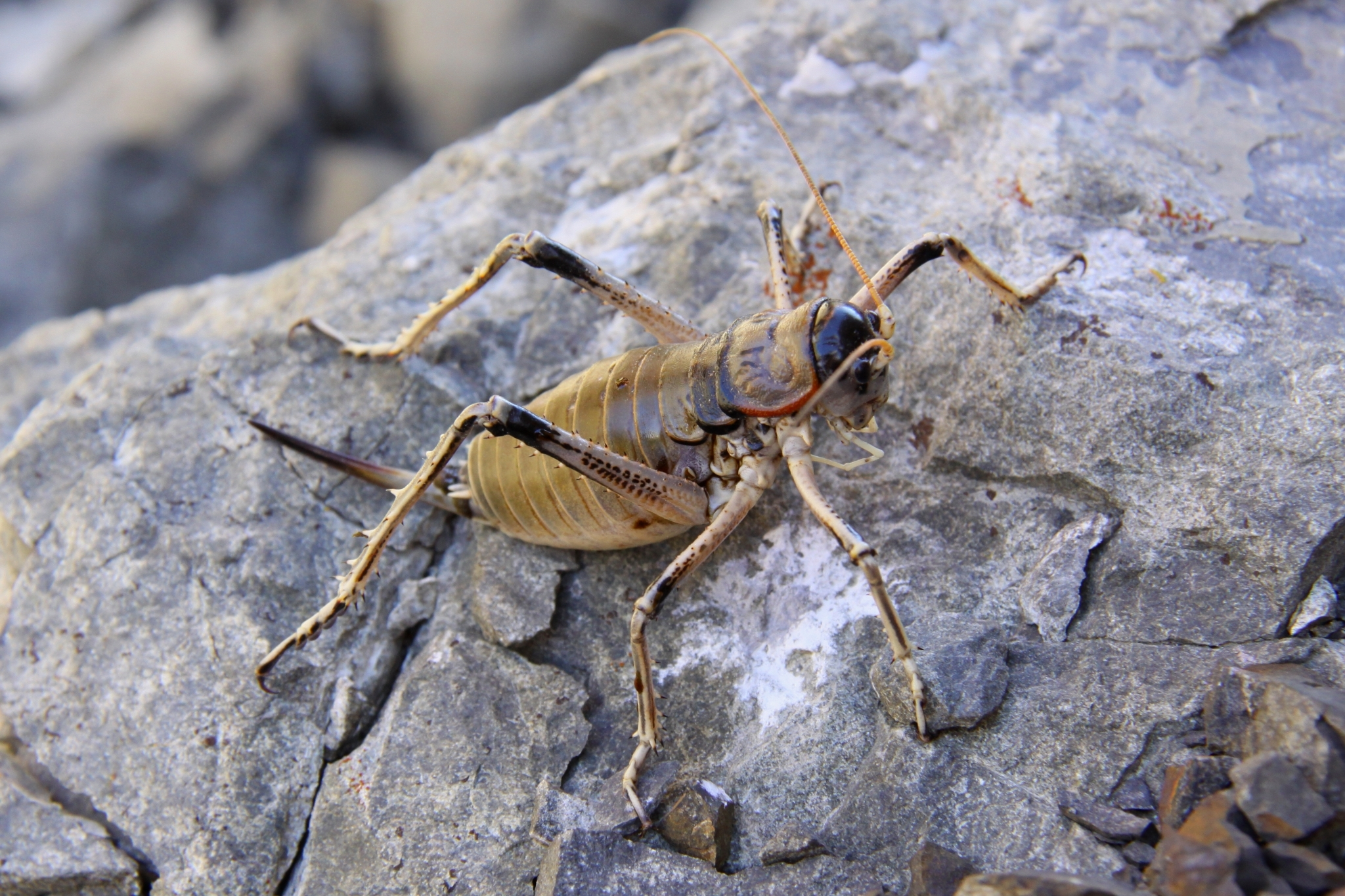
Some of the colour variation of D. connectens

Like other Deinacrida, the male is smaller than the female, with the male being about 3.5 cm (1.4 in) in length, whereas the adult female is about 4.5 cm (1.8 in) in length, although the female can reach up 7.2 cm (2.8 in). The adult can reach almost 10 g (0.35 oz) in weight. Throughout its distribution, body colour is extremely variable. In some populations, individuals may have mostly black bodies (for example, those in a population located at Spence Peak in Southland) whereas others may have a mix of red, grey and olive colours. The antennae are about half as long as the body length. The pronotum (the upper part of the thorax) is thicker along its margins. Each sex can be distinguished by presence or absence of an ovipositor, which is only present in the female. It is a long, curved spiny structure at the end of the abdomen that is used for depositing eggs and is about half as long as the body. The hind legs possess tiny peg-like structures about 19.9 µm long, referred to as stridulatory pegs which are used to produce sound by rubbing their abdominal tergites, which also possess peg structures around 77.5 µm long. When alive, the species has a musky odour.

== Distribution and habitat ==
Deinacrida connectens is restricted to the South Island of New Zealand, where its distribution extends from the Wharepapa / Arthur Range in the Tasman region to Takitimu Range in the Southland region. The range of D. connectens is known to overlap with those of other giant wētā, such as Deinacrida pluvialis in the western Otago mountains, and Deinacrida parva and Deinacrida elegans in the Kaikōura region. This relatively widespread species distribution is unusual for Deinacrida, where species usually have a restricted distribution. D. connectens generally inhabits scree slopes in alpine zones at elevations between 1,200 m (3,900 ft) and 3,600 m (11,800 ft) above sea level, but juveniles have also been found at 990 m (3,250 ft) above sea level. It is not known what factor restricts them to this zone. The lower limit for their elevation range isolates populations on each mountain range. D. connectens is presumably the most abundant species of Deinacrida.

== Behaviour ==
During the day, Deinacrida connectens remains under rocks and in crevices of scree slopes. It may nestle with other conspecifics during this time. At night, it comes out of cover to feed. When disturbed, D connectens will either remain motionless or attempt to run away and if they need to defend themselves, they will raise their legs in a threatening posture and produce soft sounds. The sounds produced are soft and sound like when palms are rubbed together. D. connectens has been described as an aggressive species, and will bite if provoked (although they do not appear to be strong enough to break skin). In laboratory conditions (at temperatures higher than they normally experience), D. connectens have been known to travel nearly 4 metres per minute.

After feeding, D. connectens will engage in perching behaviour, where it stands at the peak of a rock for extended periods of time during the night. In experimental conditions, individuals appeared to maintain an individual distance from one another while out at night. This boundary was maintained by producing sound and using their hind legs to push and kick away other individuals that got too close. However, this boundary does not seem to be maintained during the day, when individuals may huddle together under rocks and in crevices.

During mating in experimental conditions, males remain beneath the female, with the pair facing the same direction and with their bodies creating an angle of 30°. Copulation has been observed to last around 35 minutes. Mating would be concluded once the male walked away. There is a single observation in experimental conditions of a male scree wētā attempting to separate a mating pair.

== Ecology ==
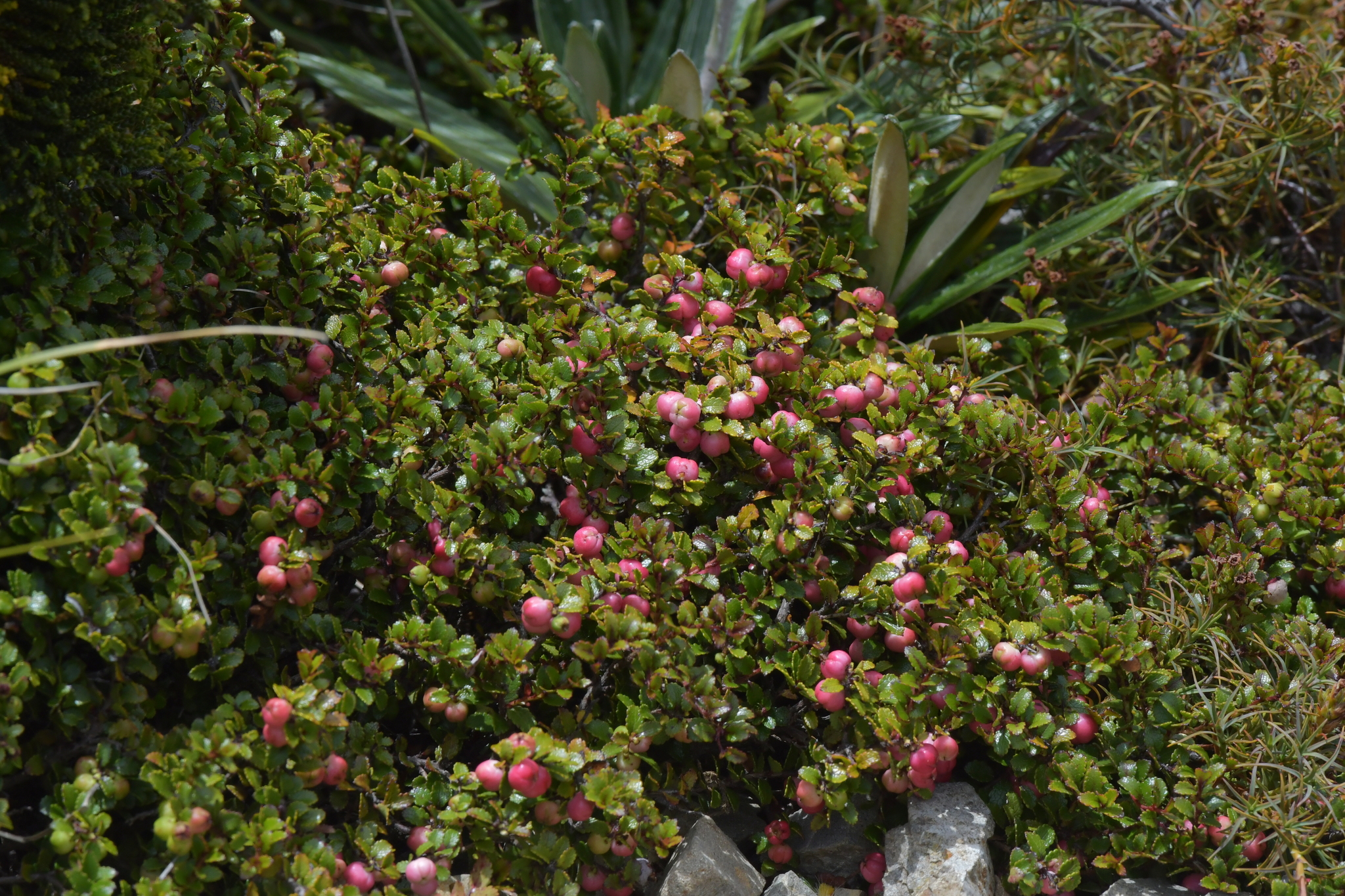
Gaultheria depressa, one of the food sources of D. connectens

Deinacrida connectens is adapted to be moderately freeze tolerant and is adapted to high elevation zones. It is known to be omnivorous, but in the wild is generally observed feeding on plants. D. connectens has been observed in the wild browsing lichens, herbs and shrubs such as Aciphylla and Gaultheria depressa. In captivity, D. connectens has been observed to eat vegetables, fruit, raw beef, cheese and insects such as cicadas and beetles. Feeding generally occurs early at night, after D. connectens has emerged from their daytime cover.

It is known to be capable of dispersing some fleshy fruit seeds by endozoochory. In an experiment, D. connectens' ability to disperse seeds of Gaultheria depressa by feeding was found to be dependent on the size of the wētā. At smaller sizes, fewer seeds were eaten and the wētā could be considered seed predators, (almost no seeds made it intact through the guts of individuals measuring 2 cm or less). With larger sized wētā however, thousands of seeds were consumed, some of which were presumably capable of being dispersed large distances, suggesting D. connectens can act as a seed disperser. One captive individual D. connectens was recorded successfully passing 686 intact seeds.

== Genetics ==
Genetic diversity within Deinacrida connectens is high, being much greater than normal for insects. In a phylogeography study of D. connectens, research found seven genetic lineages from mtDNA haplotypes, where each occupied a discrete geographic region. The average genetic difference between haplotypes was 4.8%. This genetic structure combined with lineage age estimations suggests D. connectens radiated during the Pliocene mountain building that created the Southern Alps four million years ago. It was also suggested that subsequent glaciation may have helped foster isolation between population of D. connectens. The scree wētā is diploid with an even number of chromosomes in females, and an odd number in males, but populations within this species have differing numbers of chromosomes. There are seven known karyotypes (a complete set of chromosomes) within D. connectens. These karyotypes range from seventeen to twenty-two chromosomes.

== Conservation ==
Under the New Zealand Threat Classification System as of 2022, Deinacrida connectens is listed as a "Not Threatened" species with the qualifier of "Data Poor: Trend". Due to being restricted to high elevation, it is thought that introduced mammalian predators are not a threat to D. connectens populations, since these predators are uncommon in these regions. This is in contrast to other Deinacrida species, which are generally at lower elevation and are more frequently preyed upon by introduced predators, causes a decline in giant wētā species abundance.
