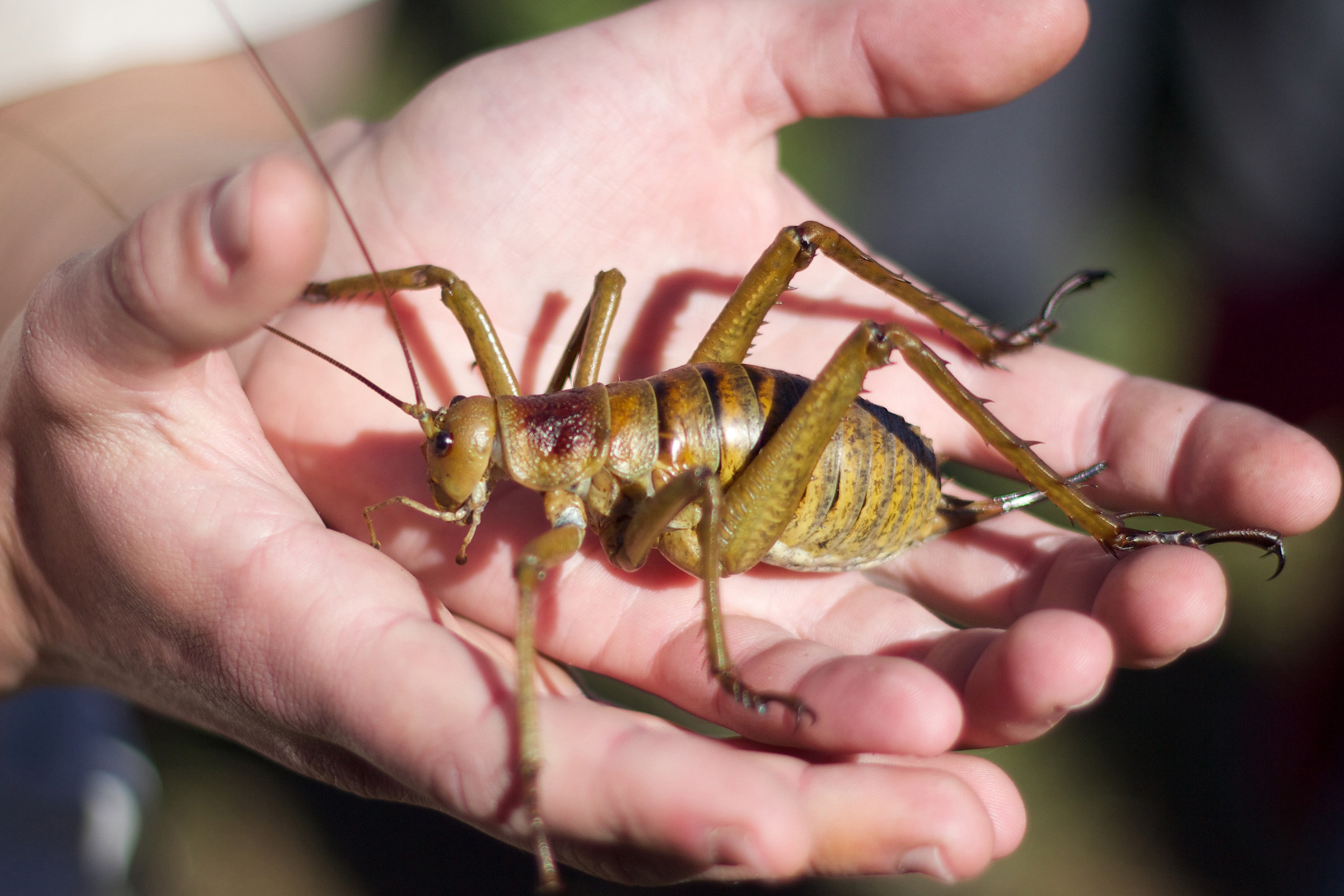
- Wētāpunga (Deinacrida heteracantha) – overall length 20 cm (8 inches)

Scientific classification
- Kingdom: Animalia
- Phylum: Arthropoda
- Clade: Pancrustacea
- Class: Insecta
- Order: Orthoptera
- Suborder: Ensifera
- Family: Anostostomatidae
- Subfamily: Deinacridinae
- Genus: Deinacrida; White, 1842

Species
- List of species
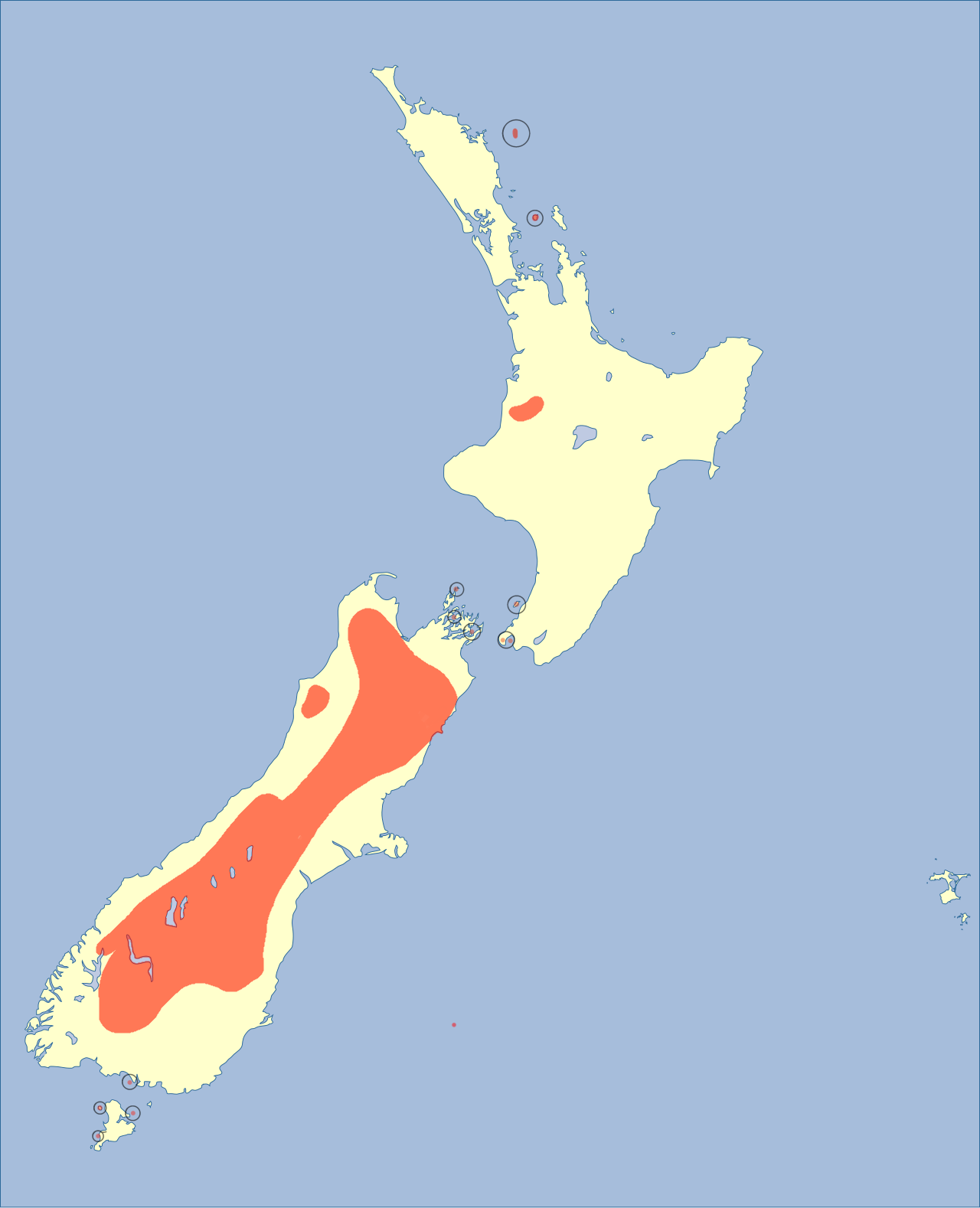

= Giant wētā =

Genus of orthopteran insects

Giant wētā are several species of wētā in the genus Deinacrida of the family Anostostomatidae. Giant wētā are endemic to New Zealand and all but one species are protected by law because they are considered at risk of extinction.

There are eleven species of giant wētā, most of which are larger than other wētā, despite the latter also being large by insect standards. Large species can be up to 7 cm (3 in), not inclusive of legs and antennae, with body mass usually no more than 35 g (1.2 oz). One gravid captive female reached a mass of about 70 g (2.47 oz), making it one of the heaviest insects in the world and heavier than a sparrow. This is, however, abnormal, as this individual was unmated and retained an abnormal number of eggs. The largest species of giant wētā is the Little Barrier Island giant wētā, also known as the wētāpunga.

Giant wētā tend to be less social and more passive than other wētā. Their genus name, Deinacrida, means "terrible grasshopper", from the Greek word δεινός (deinos, meaning "terrible", "potent", or "fearfully great"). They are found primarily on New Zealand offshore islands, having been almost exterminated on the mainland islands by introduced mammalian pests.

== Habitat and distribution ==
Most populations of giant wētā have been in decline since humans began modifying the New Zealand environment. All but one giant wētā species is protected by law because they are considered at risk of extinction. Three arboreal giant wētā species are found in the north of New Zealand and now restricted to mammal-free habitats. This is because the declining abundance of most wētā species, particularly giant wētā, can be attributed to the introduction of mammalian predators, habitat destruction, and habitat modification by introduced mammalian browsers. New populations of some wētā have been established in locations, particularly on islands, where these threats have been eliminated or severely reduced in order to reduce the risk of extinction. Deinacrida heteracantha, and D. fallai are found only on near-shore islands that have no introduced predators (Te Hauturu-o-Toi and Poor Knights Island). The closely related species D. mahoenui is restricted to habitat fragments in North Island.

Two closely related giant wētā species are less arboreal. Deinacrida rugosa is restricted to mammal-free reserves and D. parva is found near Kaikōura in the South Island of New Zealand.

Many giant wētā species are alpine specialists. Five species are only found at high elevation in South Island. The scree wētā D. connectens lives about 1,200 m (3,900 ft) above sea level and freezes solid when temperatures drop below −5 °C (23 °F). Though the alpine species tend to be smaller on average than those other ground dwelling species.

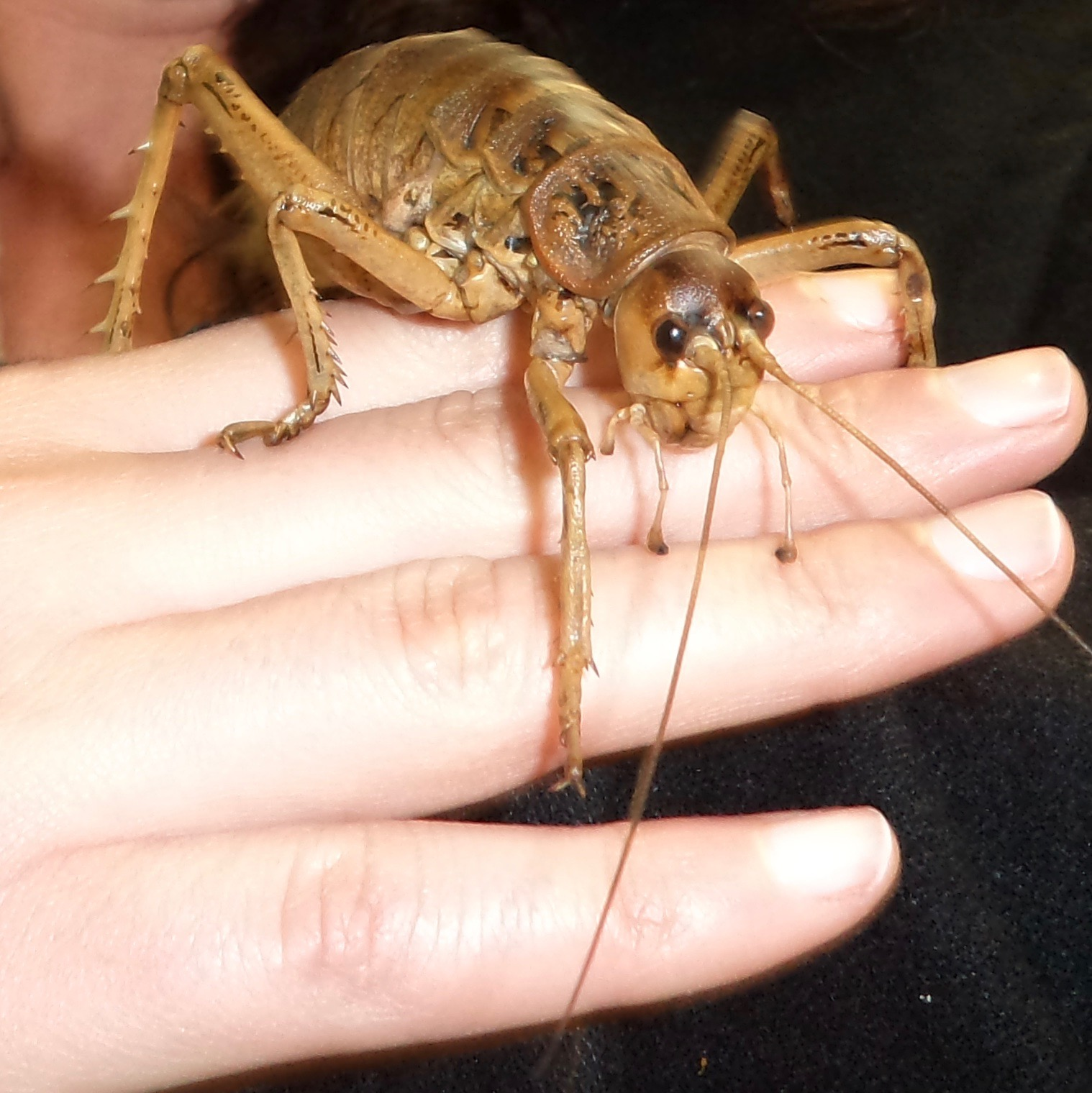
Herbivorous and gentle - an adult female giant wētā from Mana Island New Zealand (Deinacrida rugosa) is rare and endangered.

== Species list ==
- Deinacrida carinata, Herekopare wētā
- Deinacrida connectens, Scree wētā
- Deinacrida elegans, Bluff wētā
- Deinacrida fallai, Poor Knights giant wētā
- Deinacrida heteracantha, Little Barrier Island giant wētā
- Deinacrida mahoenui, Mahoenui giant wētā
- Deinacrida parva, Kaikoura giant wētā
- Deinacrida pluvialis, Mt Cook giant wētā
- Deinacrida rugosa, Cook Strait giant wētā
- Deinacrida talpa, Giant mole wētā
- Deinacrida tibiospina, Mt Arthur giant wētā

== Mating and reproduction ==
=== Scramble competition polygyny ===
Giant wētā are observed to be a largely solitary genus, with little aggregation seen in mature individuals. Most species within the Deinacrida genus exhibit scramble competition polygyny, where male wētā travel to find mature females within an area. Males of species such as the alpine Scree Wētā (Deinacrida connectens) aim to detect as many females as possible to mate with, increasing their reproductive success. Strong phenotypic selection for movement ability benefits reproductive success of the males, as individuals who can cover greater distances are likely to gain more access to a greater quantity of females.

=== Sexual dimorphism ===
Research suggests a correlation between body size of the female Cook Strait giant wētā (Deinacrida rugosa) and quantities of sperm deposited by their male mates. Male wētā produce spermatophores (small packets containing sperm) which are transferred to the female wētā during the process of copulation. However, it has been established that males are transferring a higher quantity of spermatophores to the lighter females, when compared to their heavier counterparts, suggesting an intentional allocation of reproductive effort. Due to the scramble competition polygyny being prevalent in giant wētā populations, and larger females participating in more mating behaviours, there is an increased competition between the males mating with larger females. This is because the larger female wētā presumably mate more frequently, increasing competition between individual males for paternity. Previously, it was thought that male wētā would allocate more of their reproductive energy to larger females, as a lot of larger female invertebrates are more fertile/can produce a higher quantity of offspring at one time. However, this study indicates males may choose to supply the smaller females with more spermatophores as a way to ensure paternity and decrease the risk of sperm competition, which may also be true of other giant wētā species.

=== Courtship and mating ===
The mating systems observed in giant wētā species like the Scree Wētā (Deinacrida connectens) and Cook Strait giant wētā (Deinacrida rugosa) likely led to the development of sexual dimorphism. where males develop lighter, more slender bodies and longer legs allows them to cover distance more efficiently has developed. Similarly, males who have a larger overall body size may have a competitive advantage when engaging in scramble competitions with other males for access to females, through their ability to overpower smaller rivals.

Despite establishing a mate pair overnight, the Little Barrier Giant Wētā (Deinacrida heteracantha) can be later found mating and engaging in pre-copulatory and post-copulatory behaviour during the day, despite being nocturnal. Similarly, it is implied that very little courtship behaviour occurs, but instead pairs engage in repetitive copulation to promote the maturation of eggs or spermatophores.

Additionally, there is very limited information about parental care of giant wētā species, but similar species groups of ground weta (Hemiandrus) have shown that females provide their eggs and larvae with care, and males provide females with a spermatophylax to ensure she has essential nutrients to produce healthy young. It is likely that a similar process occurs in giant wētā species, particularly in ground dwelling species including D. connectens and D. rugosa.

== Diet ==
Though the giant wētā have historically been depicted as New Zealand's rodent equivalent, their diets and morphology are drastically different. While most wētā species are omnivorous, the largest giant wētā usually follow a herbivorous diet. The scree wētā (Deinacrida connectens) have been observed consuming small fleshy fruits and dispersing the remaining seeds, however the dispersal rates of each scree wētā individual largely depended on its size. This may also be true of other giant wētā species, but there is no currently published supporting literature.

== Communication and social behaviours ==
Recent studies have shown the use of vibrational communication between Cook Strait giant wētā as a display of intrasexual agonism. It has been seen that male individuals are producing low frequency sounds (~37 Hz) through a process called dorso-ventral tremulation, which then travel through different materials found in their environments including bark and leaflitter. The sound is produced by the males moving their bodies (specifically the abdominal region) in an up and down fashion and is used to signal competition to other males in the presence of a nearby female. It is implied that these sounds do not have a direct role in courtship (male-female) behaviour, but are solely a form of intrasexual competition. Additionally, it was found that the males who initiate the tremulation behaviour had greater mating success, rather than the individual with the more notable signal. Behaviour involving vibrational signals as a form of communication are widely observed in the Orthopteran order. Though it has not yet been described, it is likely that other giant wētā likely also display these vibrational communication behaviours.

== Threats ==
New Zealand's endemic species have evolved over millions of years without the presence of mammalian predators, other than the two native bat species; the long-tailed bat (Chalinolobus tuberculatus) and the lesser short-tailed bat (Mystacina tuberculata) which primarily feed on pollen, nectar and invertebrates. This has meant many native species have lost their ability to avoid predation by flying over time through lack of necessity. This is particularly prominent in many birds such as the kiwi and insects including the wētā. Since humans began inhabiting New Zealand in ~1280 AD, there has been consistent introduction of mammalian and bird species, many of which are predators to native fauna. Other than introduced species, changes to the climate and habitat ranges have heavily impacted the populations of giant wētā.

Major threats to giant wētā in New Zealand
Threat	Description	Impact	Species affected
Invasive introduced predators	Introduced species which have been brought from overseas in recent centuries such as dogs, cats, rats, possums and stoats can feed on giant wētā.	Due to not having evolved behaviours or traits which help avoid introduced predators, giant wētā become an easy target, particularly due to their flightlessness, and large size which prevent them from being able to escape predation quickly and effectively.	Mostly ground dwelling species, particularly Deinacrida heteracantha and Deinacrida rugosa.
Habitat destruction and human activity	Changes to the natural environment caused primarily by human activity including deforestation, urban development/sprawl, agriculture and tourism.	Disturbances to natural habitats for giant wētā, especially areas where the wētā forage, nest and reproduce can cause significant declines in population densities. This can have much more drastic impacts when habitat destruction occurs quickly, in large quantities.	All species, especially ground dwelling, mainland species.
Climate change	The accelerated gradual warming of the planet caused by human activity and increased production of greenhouse gases.	Changes in global temperature which occur at a fast rate can have negative impacts on the reproductive capabilities of many species, including the giant wētā. Sudden temperature changes may affect the reproductive patterns seen in the wētā, while also having the potential to change the constituents of their diet, and the other organisms in their food chain. Consequently, the habitat occupied by giant wētā may change due to change in dietary needs.	All species.
Introduced insect species	Insects which have been introduced from other countries may compete with giant wētā for resources.	Other insect species which have been introduced pose a risk for endangering giant wētā species through competition for resources. Introduced species may compete with the wētā for food and habitats, potentially causing the resources to reach capacity, inhibiting further population growth.	Mainland species.

== History of giant wētā conservation and future directions ==
=== Mahoenui giant wētā ===
In 1962, the presumably extinct Mahoenui giant wētā species were found in a small population in the central North Island of New Zealand. The population was found thriving in a patch of gorse (Ulex europaeus), an introduced plant species widely recognised as an invasive weed. However, due to its spiny nature, predators of the Mahoenui giant wētā were deterred, leaving the population to grow. Similarly, the gorse provided a habitat and food source for the giant wētā. Alongside the giant wētā surrounding the gorse were feral goats (Capra hircus) found to be feeding on the gorse plants, leading to their regeneration through digestion and excretion of the plant matter. This mutualistic relationship between the goats, gorse and the Mahoenui giant wētā has led to New Zealand's Department of Conservation turning the area into the Mahoenui Giant Wētā Scientific Reserve where all three species are protected.

=== Little Barrier Island giant wētā (wētāpunga) ===
Located to the north of Auckland city, Te Hauturu-o-Toi, also known as Little Barrier Island, is the home to the largest of the giant weta species, the wētāpunga (Deinacrida heteracantha). Being New Zealand's oldest nature reserve becoming protected in 1895, the island has remained free of introduced rodents. This has allowed for large populations of wētāpunga to form free of disturbance. Due to introduced pests impacting other endemic species on other islands, there has been translocation of the wētāpunga to Tiritiri Matangi Island and Motuora Island in the Auckland region. As a result, the captively bred translocated individuals would act as a buffer if endangerment of the wētāpunga were to occur (due to infiltration by introduced species), while also helping maintain the native ecosystems involving other insects at these sites.

=== Future directions for giant wētā conservation ===
The future of conservation of endemic species in New Zealand, particularly giant wētā species rely on predator control and minimising habitat loss. Maintenance and strict control of pre-existing predator free islands such as Little Barrier Island and Tiritiri Matangi will allow populations of giant wētā species to grow, eventually allowing them to be translocated back to the mainland for repopulation once mammalian pests/predators have been minimised. Additionally, mitigating urbanisation in areas which giant wētā inhabit, providing information to the public about wētā, and further captive breeding and genetic management may help to prevent further endangerment.
