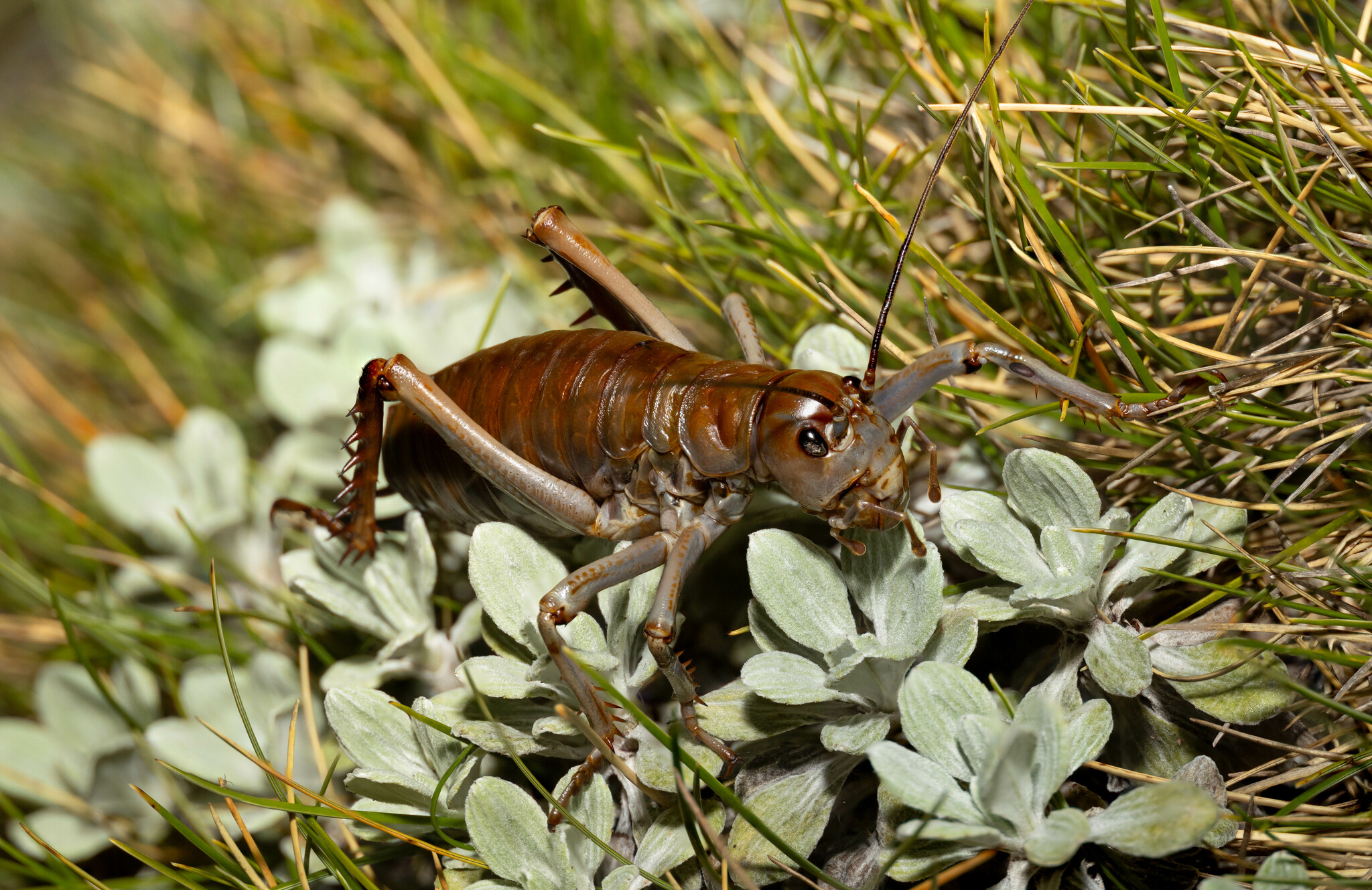

Conservation status
- Nationally Critical (NZ TCS)

Scientific classification
- Kingdom: Animalia
- Phylum: Arthropoda
- Clade: Pancrustacea
- Class: Insecta
- Order: Orthoptera
- Suborder: Ensifera
- Family: Anostostomatidae
- Genus: Deinacrida
- Species: D. talpa

Binomial name
- Deinacrida talpa Gibbs, 1999
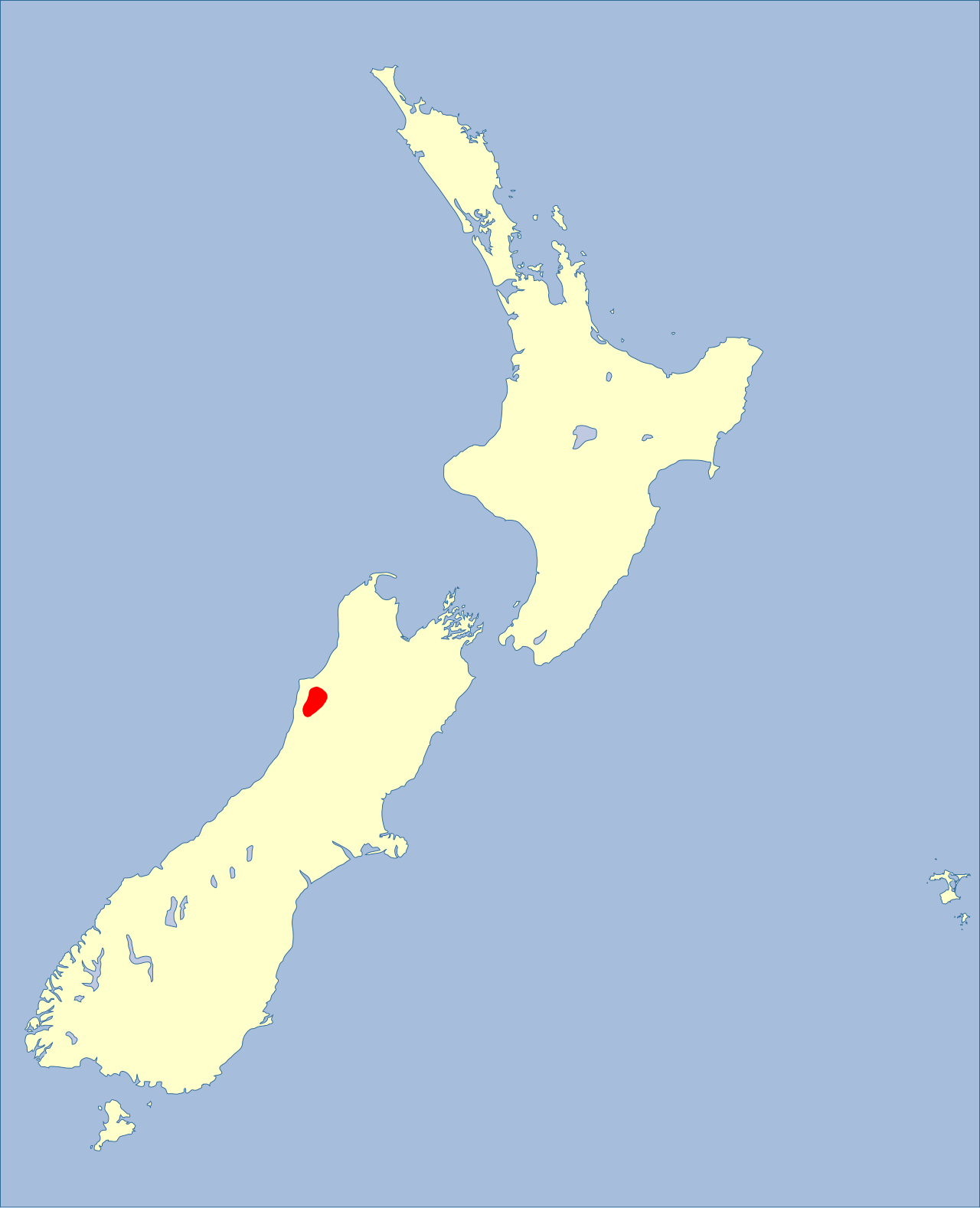

= Deinacrida talpa =

Species of orthopteran insect

Deinacrida talpa, the giant mole wētā, is a species of insect in the family Anostostomatidae. It is endemic to New Zealand. Although the species is similar to closely related species, its key distinguishing factor is their ability to live in burrows dug by the wētā. In 2022, the Department of Conservation assessed its status as "Threatened: Nationally Critical". Distribution of D. talpa is confined to the Paparoa Range at elevations from 1,150 to 1,350 m (3,770 to 4,430 ft).
