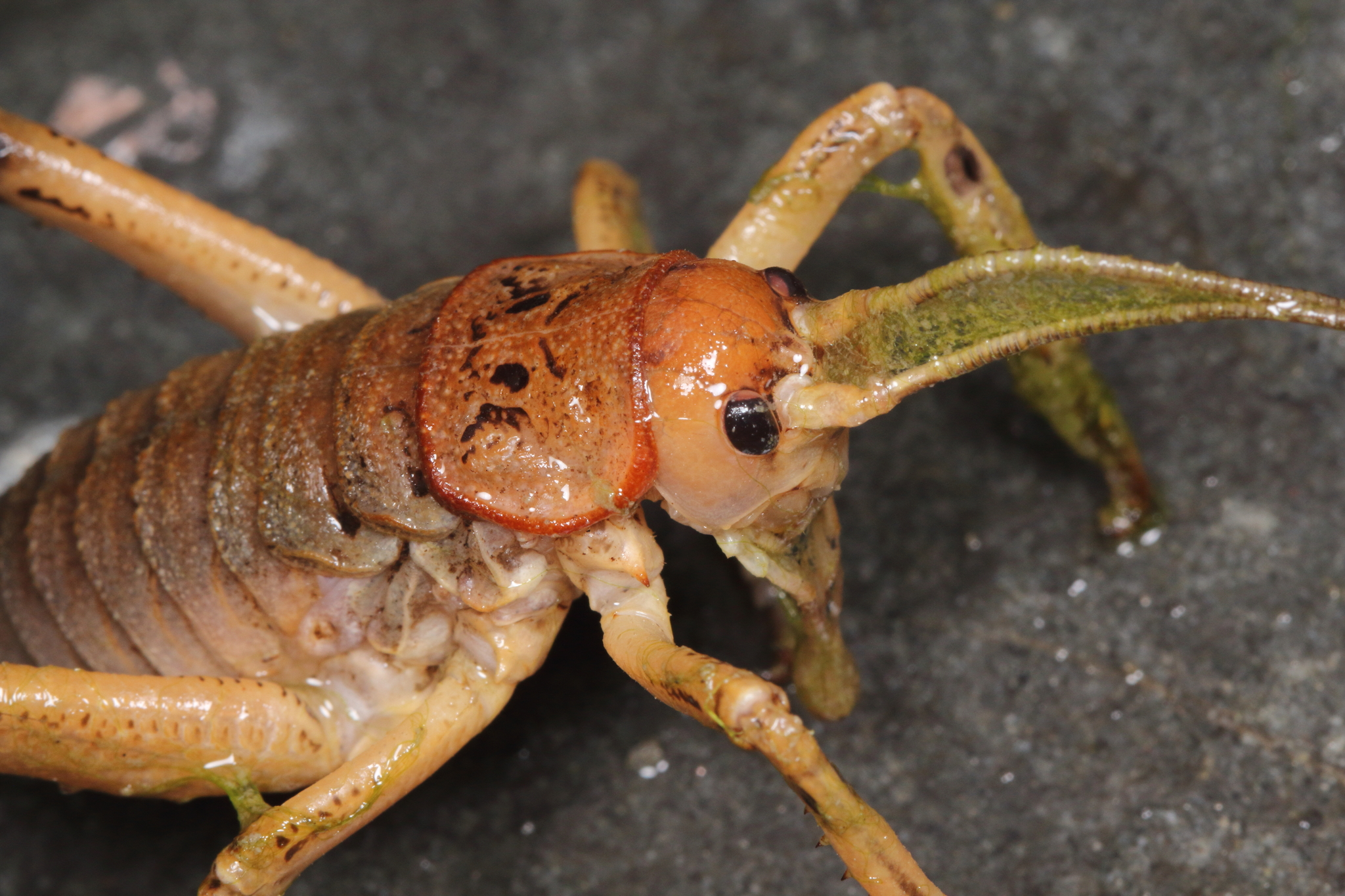

Conservation status
- Data Deficient (IUCN 2.3)

- Nationally Vulnerable (NZ TCS)

Scientific classification
- Kingdom: Animalia
- Phylum: Arthropoda
- Clade: Pancrustacea
- Class: Insecta
- Order: Orthoptera
- Suborder: Ensifera
- Family: Anostostomatidae
- Genus: Deinacrida
- Species: D. parva

Binomial name
- Deinacrida parva Buller, 1895
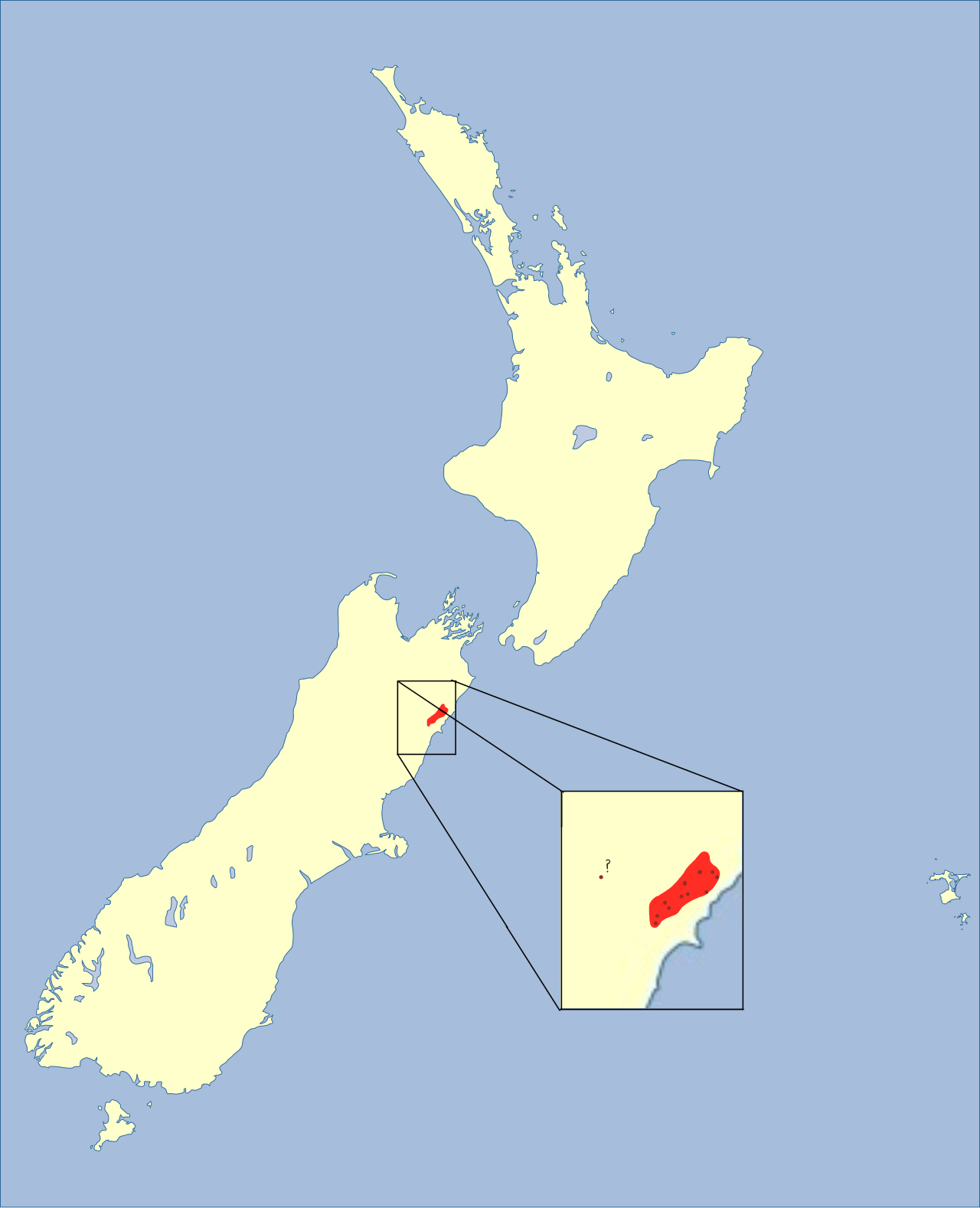

= Deinacrida parva =

Species of orthopteran insect

Deinacrida parva is a species of insect in the family Anostostomatidae, the king crickets and weta. It is known commonly as the Kaikoura wētā or Kaikoura giant wētā. It was first described in 1894 from a male individual then rediscovered in 1966 by Dr J.C. Watt at Lake Sedgemore in Upper Wairau. It is endemic to New Zealand, where it can be found in the northern half of the South Island.

This is a small to medium-sized robust wētā. It is easily confused with Deinacrida rugosa. Due to the rarity of this weta, there is still much to be learnt.

== Description ==
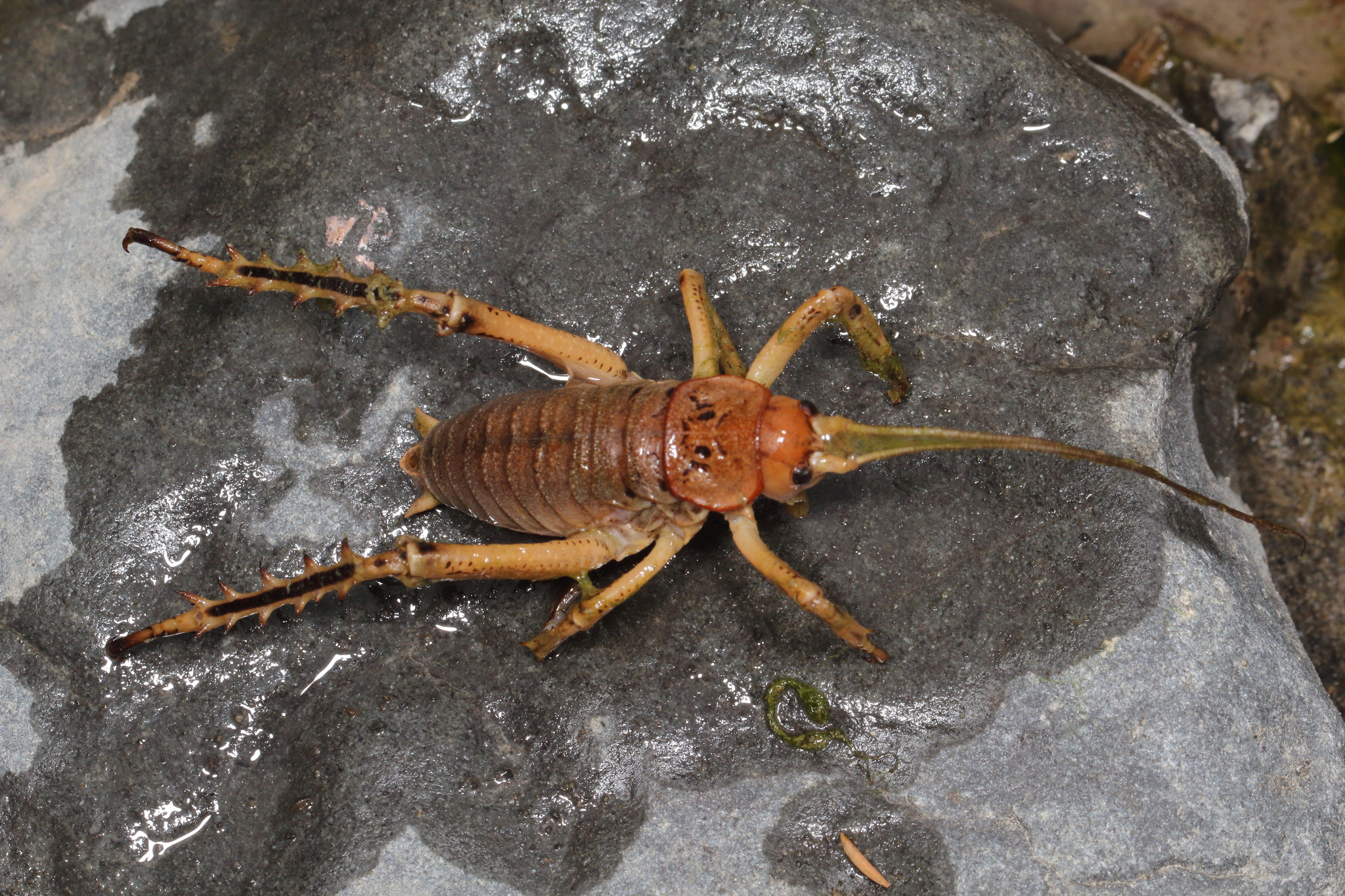
Deinacrida parva observed near Kaikōura

Deinacrida parva have a rounded brown body. The females are larger than the males in this species of wētā, but the males have long legs suggesting scramble competition for mates. The females have a large spike on the end of their body, this spike is called an ovipositor and is used for laying eggs.

The Kaikoura giant wētā can grow up to around 100mm in size and weigh up to 14.5 grams. They have a life span of roughly two years. This wētā, although very similar in appearance, is smaller in size than D. rugosa and is a brown colour with darker colouring under the abdomen. Red or pink coloration can also be present on the border of the thoracic shield. A major identification of the Kaikoura Wētā is by counting the six spines present on the lower hind leg.

The taxonomic status of D.parva and D. rugosa were investigated. These two are species are morphologically similar and phylogenetically sister species.

== Habitat and distribution ==
Deinacrida parva are found in many different terrestrial environments but most commonly under large logs on river flats and scrub areas close to the edges of the forests. Large proportions of individuals are found under mataī logs. Their preference for living close to water ways has resulted in the drowning of some individuals, although this might be linked to infection by internal parasites.

D. parva are found between 150 and 1500m above sea level from South Marlborough to Hanmer Springs. These weta are considered subalpine specialists. They are most common surrounding Hapuku and Kowhai river close to Kaikōura (hence the name of these wētā).

It is suspected they now occupy less than 10% of their former range.

== Diet ==
Deinacrida parva are herbivorous and feed mainly on the leaves of trees and shrubs. Females of this species have been known to eat carcasses of dead or dying insects for extra protein during breeding season for egg development.

== Behaviour ==
This weta, like many of the other weta in New Zealand, is nocturnal.

D. parva are able to produce sounds by rubbing tergite spines and hair sensilla together (located on their abdominal plates). The sounds are normally produced during contraction of the abdomen and often in time with a defensive leg kick as a warning. This is called the tergo-tergal mechanism. The sounds produced are a soft hiss and often fall within ultrasonic frequencies. Using hair sensilla for sound production is a rare occurrence in arthropods and a potential explanation for why it has occurred in this species is that it has evolved under predation pressure by the endemic short-tailed bat in New Zealand. There are no current evidence that the sounds produced are for intraspecific communication but it has not been researched extensively.

== Breeding ==
D. parva have been breed in captivity. But due to wētā being captured at different ages and conditions, breeding pairs were hard to establish. Young wētā come to sexual maturity successfully in captivity but some fail to lay eggs. Females lay eggs in the soil with an ovipositor.

== Conservation ==
Under the New Zealand Threat Classification System, as of 2022 the species is listed as "Nationally Vulnerable" with the qualifiers of "Data Poor: Size" and "Data Poor: Trend".

Populations in some parts have declined to a few individuals. Many of the die-offs have been in the large populations close to Kaikoura. Even though there has been a die off the population is considered to be stable.

A major reason for decline is likely due to habitat clearance and predation by pests. The changes in the natural habitat of D. parva has affected the chances of future survival in many of the smaller recorded populations. Many of their original habitats have been cleared for pasture. The die-offs could be associated with the Gordian worm parasite. But the full impact of the parasite is unknown and still requires further research. D. parva that become hosts for the Gordian worm parasite have been shown to have lowered reproductive capabilities.

Further population surveys and full distribution research needs to be conducted for further information. Although that has been difficult due to low population numbers, thick vegetation and uneven grounds. Searching for these weta in the fallen logs (where they are most likely to be found) also damages and degrades the logs quicker and leaves less available habitats for them. It has been proposed that they should be bred and then released on predator-free islands. Mainland habitat management has also been suggested as a conservation plan.
