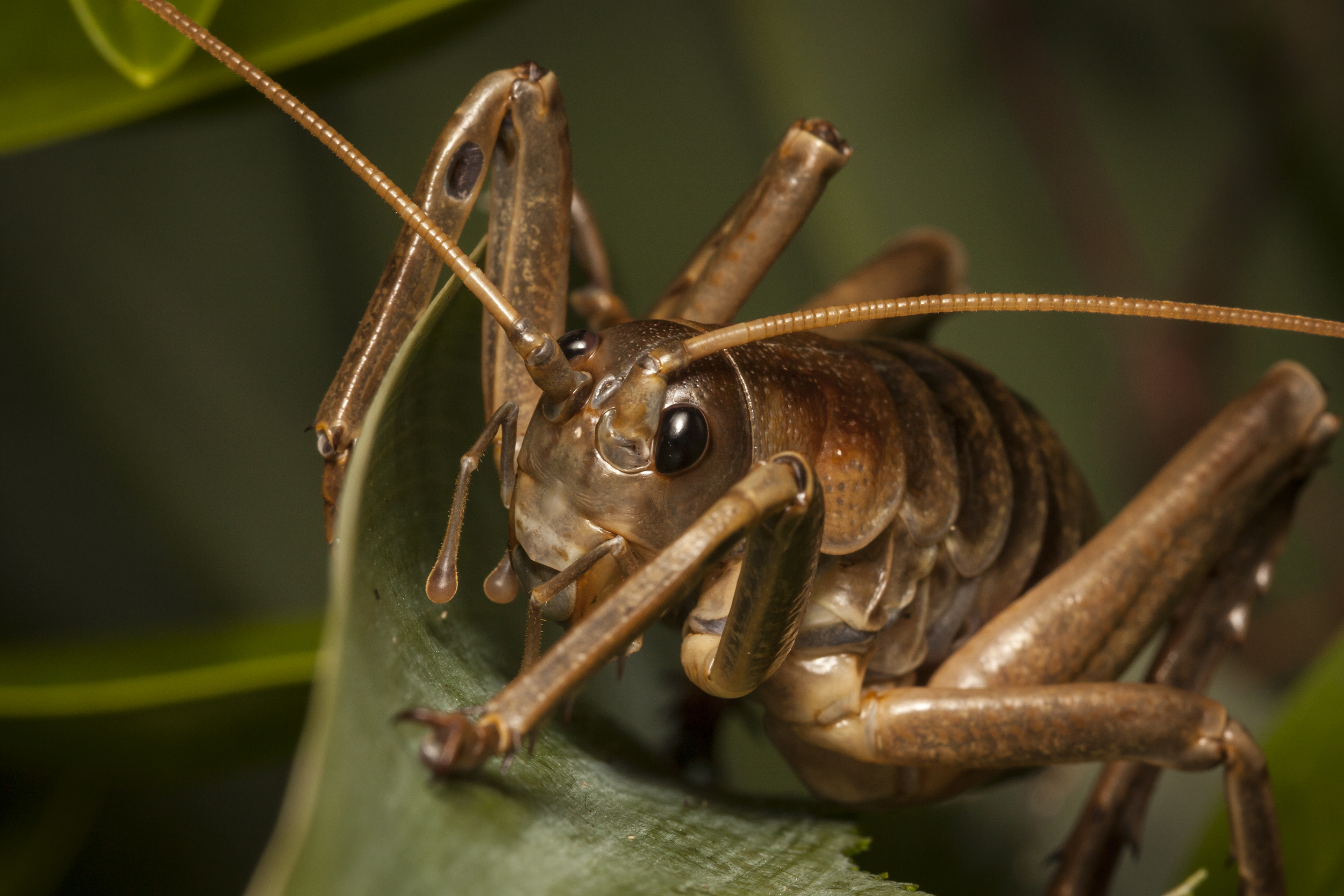

Conservation status
- Vulnerable (IUCN 2.3)

Scientific classification
- Kingdom: Animalia
- Phylum: Arthropoda
- Class: Insecta
- Order: Orthoptera
- Suborder: Ensifera
- Family: Anostostomatidae
- Genus: Deinacrida
- Species: D. fallai

Binomial name
- Deinacrida fallai Salmon, 1950
- Native range on a map of the North Island

= Deinacrida fallai =

Species of orthopteran insect

Deinacrida fallai or the Poor Knights giant wētā is a species of insect in the family Anostostomatidae. It is endemic to the Poor Knights Islands off northern New Zealand. D. fallai are commonly called giant wētā due to their large size. They are one of the largest insects in the world, with a body length measuring up to 73 mm. Their size is an example of island gigantism. They are classified as vulnerable by the IUCN due to their restricted distribution.

== Description ==
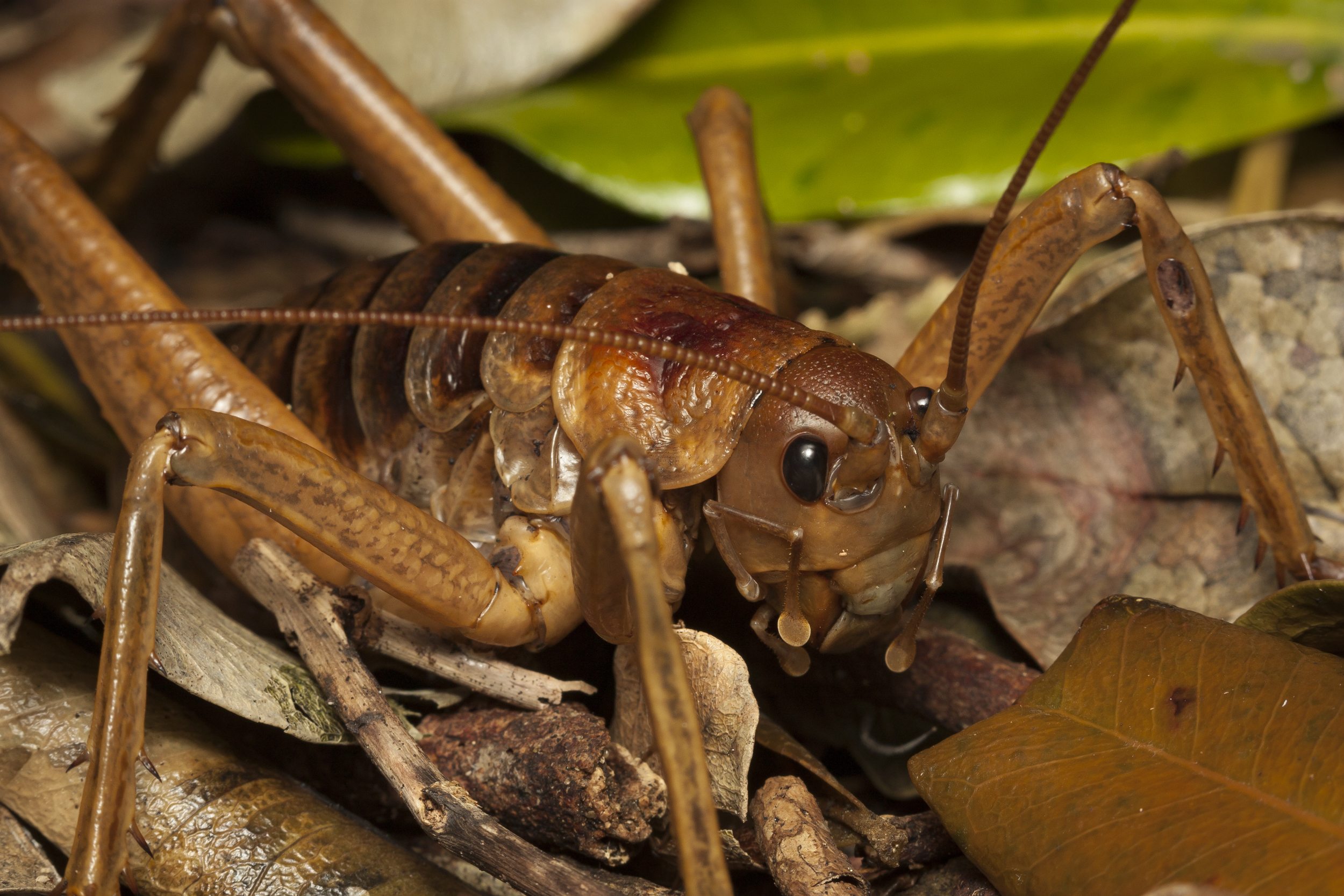
An adult Poor Knights giant wētā (Deinacrida fallai) from Aorangi Island, Poor Knights Island group, Northland, New Zealand.

Deinacrida fallai was only described as a new species in 1950. It is the second largest wētā species in the world, with females weighing up to 40g and measuring up to 73mm (2.87 inches) in length. Females are prominently larger than males. D. fallai are light brown in colour with dark brown legs. They have black stripes along the side of their body, as well as a black line marking along the dorsal surface of their body. Their bodies are distinctively broad and they have rounded heads with short mandibles.

The Poor Knights giant wētā primarily feed on kanuka and pohutukawa. Although they rely primarily on vegetation for their nutrition, it is likely that they are omnivorous. In captivity, D. fallai partially ate a male tree wētā (Hemideina thoracica). Their faces are yellow-brown in colour and are extremely large, relative to its size.

== Behaviour ==
Adult D. fallai live a relatively nomadic lifestyle, moving from tree to tree periodically. They are nocturnal in their general activities such as ecdysis, feeding, and oviposition, but mate during the day. They occur as solitary individuals and spend their day sitting among tree branches. Although D. fallai are one of the largest/heaviest insect species, they have relatively agile movements and are easily able to jump long distances up and down tree trunks and branches. They can also move quickly if they are disturbed, however, their initial reactions to disturbance is usually to freeze. This in an effective response to predators that rely mostly on visual cues. In general, males are more aggressive than females and males have been observed displaying sexual aggression towards other males during copulation.

When D. fallai are threatened or disturbed they raise their hind legs vertically over their head. They also quickly move their legs up and down to make a crackling or rasping sound over their stridulatory apparatus for the duration of disturbance. This fearsome display strongly deters any potential predators.

Nymphs up to the fifth instar display protective behaviours by burrowing head first into the soil, leaving only their hind tibia and tarsi exposed.

== Distribution and habitat ==
Deinacrida fallai has a limited distribution and is known to exist only on the rat-free Poor Knights Islands. They are common on the two large islands, Aorangi and Tawhiti Rahi. D. fallai scat/frass has also been found on Archway Island, although no definite specimens have been recorded from here. There have been no other records of its presence on neighboring islands or from the North Island of New Zealand. They are forest dwelling, arboreal insects, spending most of their time on tree trunks and branches at night. During the day they spend their time above ground, perching in foliage or hiding in the lose bark of pohutukawa. They thrive in the undisturbed pohutukawa forests on these islands where they co-exist with low to moderate density populations of tuatara. Although they are arboreal, they do also venture to the ground for oviposition, and have been found under stones in the forest.

== Life cycle ==
The average lifespan for D. fallai is a little over two years, from egg to adult death. An adult female can live for up to nine months.

=== Courtship and mating ===
Wētā studied in captivity displayed no courtship behaviour and sex recognition appeared to be through contact alone. However D. fallai in the wild have been observed displaying male trailing behaviour. This following behaviour indicates that males are attracted to a females pheromones. Mating is not restricted to any particular season and D. fallai held in captivity mated in all months except February and March. D. fallai begin copulation in the morning and continue for several hours throughout the day. They have been observed displaying four different mating positions.

The first position begins with either the male backing up under the female, or the female mounting the male, and they both direct their antennae over the back of their bodies. The male applies the distal end of his abdomen to the females sub-genital plate. This hooks their genitalia together and is usually maintained until copulation ends. This mating position causes the male to twist vertically, creating a 45- to 90-degree angle between their bodies and is sometimes assumed instantly at the beginning of copulation. This position is the most common mating position for D. fallai.

For the second mating position, the male mounts the female and curls the end of his abdomen under the females abdomen until their genitalia are hooked together. This mating position is rare and has only been observed on a few occasions.

The third mating position occurs after the wētā have been copulating in a 90 degree position for a few hours. The male twists vertically and they assume an end-to-end position with the male lying on his back. Both insects are facing in opposite directions during this position, however this doesn't last long and after about an hour they resume the 90 degree position again. This mating position has only been recorded once.

During the fourth mating position the male and female wētā lay side to side with their legs partially interlocked. Both wētā have their antennae directed over their backs and their thoracic and abdominal sternites in contact. This mating position has only been recorded once.

Each copulation lasts about an hour and the total number of copulations varies between individuals. The male and female don't usually separate during the course of continuous mating. The male produces and transfers a single spermatophore to the underside of the females sub-genital plate during each copulation. Subsequent copulations force the spermatophore ampulla out of the female where it then adheres to the base of her ovipositor. The number of spermatophores transferred to a female range from three to eight during one mating period. They are never eaten by the female.

Males are the dominant partner, keeping the passive female in place. If disturbed during copulation the female may wander off but is quickly found by the male to re-mate.

=== Oviposition and eggs ===
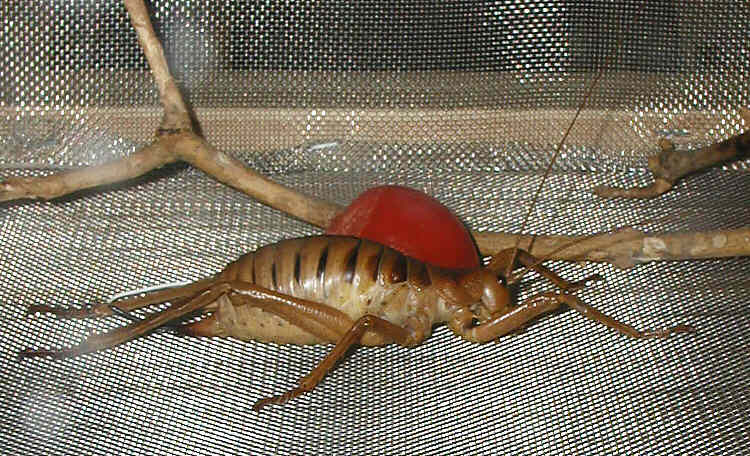
Large female D. fallai. Note the ovipositor at the rear end.

Females can lay eggs throughout their life at any time of the year, provided the ambient temperature is higher than 10 °C. They lay the eggs into soil during the night by standing on the tip of their legs and thrusting the ovipositor into the soil at a right angle to the body. Eggs are laid closely together as singles or in small groups of no more than five. They can produce anywhere between 200 and 300 egg during their lives, however the number of eggs that are laid is largely dependent on whether the conditions are favorable or not. A limited number of eggs are fertilized at each copulation and the average number of eggs laid during one oviposition time is 27 to 39. Eggs are bright yellow in the ovaries and medium brown during oviposition. They are oval in shape and approximately 2.5mm wide and 7mm long when first laid, growing to 3mm by 8mm during incubation. The surface structure of their eggs is classified by fine reticulated patterns of chorionic ridges. Eggs take approximately five months (147 days) to hatch.

=== Growth ===
During growth, D. fallai goes through 10 nymphal stages (9 nymphal instars). The ovipositor becomes visible at the third instar and size differences between the sexes is noticeable at the sixth instar. There is considerable variation in the time that each individual spends at each nymphal instar, ranging from 3 to 13 weeks. Nymphs that hatch in summer or spring will become adults 11 to 13 months later. In males, the gonads mature over a few weeks after the final ecdysis and their weight also steadily increases. Female weight increases as a result of mating stimulating egg maturation. Mating occurs once females reach at least 30g.

== Sound production ==
D. fallai use an abdomino-femoral mechanism to produce sound by rubbing their hind legs against the tergites on their abdomen. Their specific type of mechanism is called Tergo-tergal stridulatory mechanism. They have one large crescent shaped file ridge on their second tergite plate, as well as many tiny spiny pegs on the ventro-posterior portion of their tergite and several additional blunt pegs that are dorsally faced. The leading edge of the convex crescent ridge is separated by a longitudinal groove that forms two lips. On their femur they have raised, elongated pegs that are grooved to the middle of their femur and point radially away from the femur base. These pegs are also double lipped, separated by a longitudinal groove. Because the femur pegs are arranged in a radial fashion, they will rub laterally against the ridges on the tergite as the wētā moves its legs past its abdomen. When the wētā moves its back legs up and down against this stridulatory apparatus it creates a crackling or rasping sound that strongly deters potential predators.

D. fallai also use an abdominal stridulatory apparatus in which the membrane between the second and third abdominal tergites contains two small groups of lateral spines. When the wētā is annoyed, abdominal segment contractions cause the spines to rub together, producing a hissing sound. Sound production is restricted to defense behaviour.

== Phylogenetics ==
Deinacrida fallai form a monophyletic clade with two other northern arboreal wētā species: D. heteracantha and D. mahoenui. This is from phylogenetic analysis of their genetic and morphological characters. Males have 21 chromosomes, females 22 but their genome is relatively large, measuring 8.5Gbp for males and 11Gbp for females. The sex difference is due to male wētā having a single X chromosome, while females have a pair of large X chromosomes.

== Threats ==
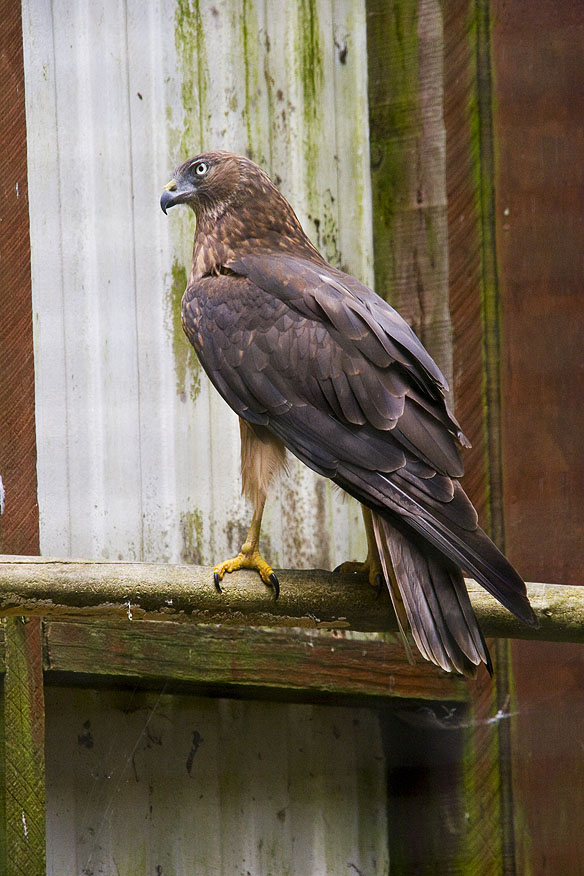
Swamp Harrier (Circus approximans). A day time predator of D. fallai.

There is currently no evidence of distribution or abundance decline, however they are preyed upon by a wide range of species. Indigenous predators include lizards, birds and tuatara. Remains of D. fallai have been found in the Swamp Harrier (Circus approximans), which is diurnal, indicating that D. fallai are accessible during the day and the harrier hawk is a main daytime predator. Although these predators do not seem to threaten the populations, special care must be taken to ensure any future introduction of insectivorous animals do not negatively impact the viability of D. fallai populations.

== Conservation ==
Deinacrida fallai are one of many giant wētā species that are protected under the Seventh Schedule of the 1953 Wildlife Act. They are listed as 'medium term recovery work' under the Department of Conservation's threatened wētā recovery plan. They are currently a category C species under the Molloy and Davis (1994) classification system, and a category VU D2 under the IUCN Red List of Threatened Species.

There is currently a pest contingency plan required for the Poor Knights Island (especially for rodents), to maintain the security of the island. Accidental introduction of rodents to the Poor Knights Islands would endanger the entire species by gravely reducing or eradicating D. fallai. Investigation is required in order to assess feasibility of the potential increase of D. fallai populations by introducing this species to other locations.

D. fallai have been successfully bred in captivity at the Wellington Zoo in New Zealand and have been used there to educate the public.
