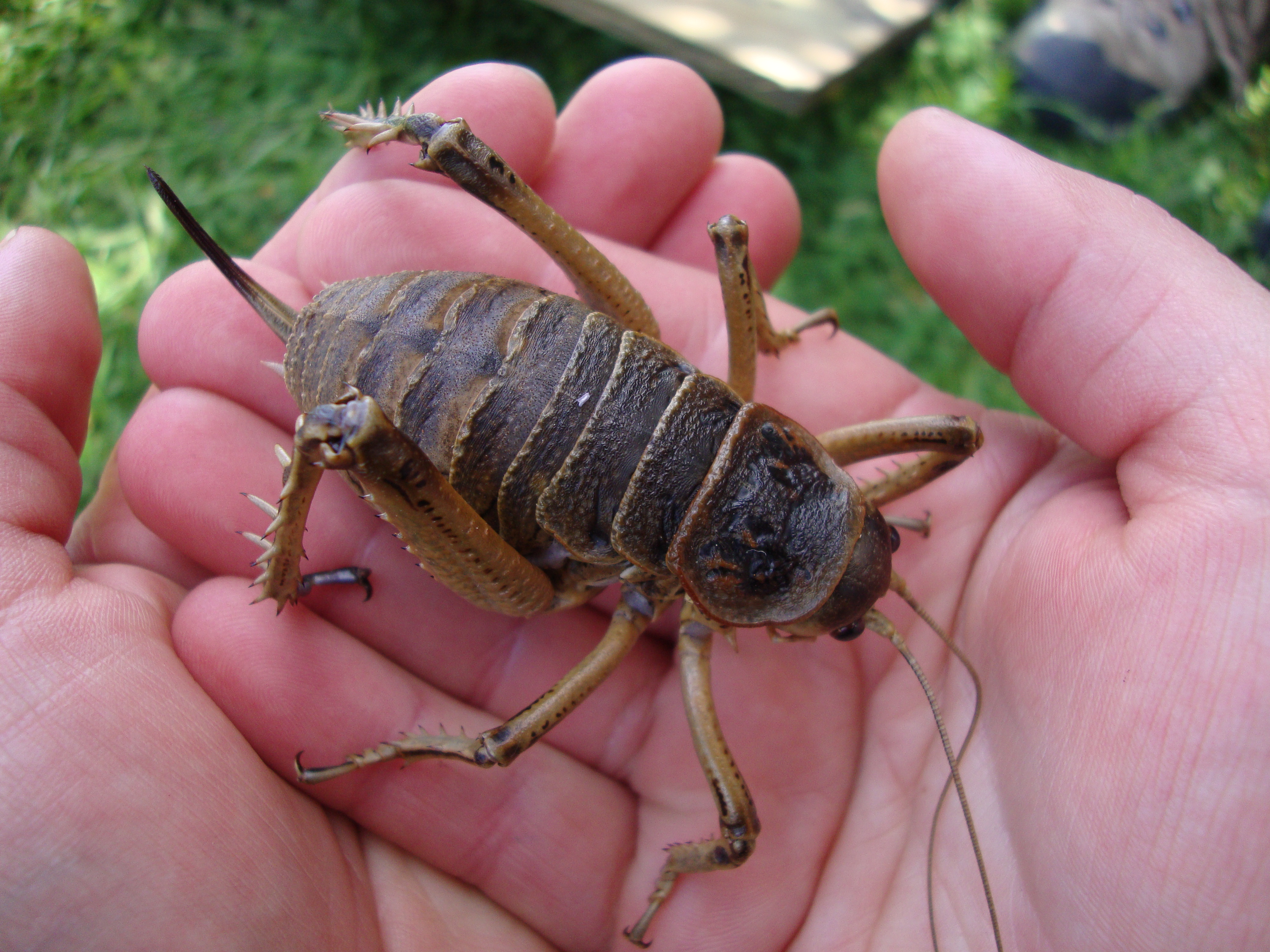
- Cook Strait giant weta from Matiu / Somes Island

Conservation status
- Vulnerable (IUCN 2.3)

- Relict (NZ TCS)

Scientific classification
- Kingdom: Animalia
- Phylum: Arthropoda
- Clade: Pancrustacea
- Class: Insecta
- Order: Orthoptera
- Suborder: Ensifera
- Family: Anostostomatidae
- Genus: Deinacrida
- Species: D. rugosa

Binomial name
- Deinacrida rugosa Buller, 1871
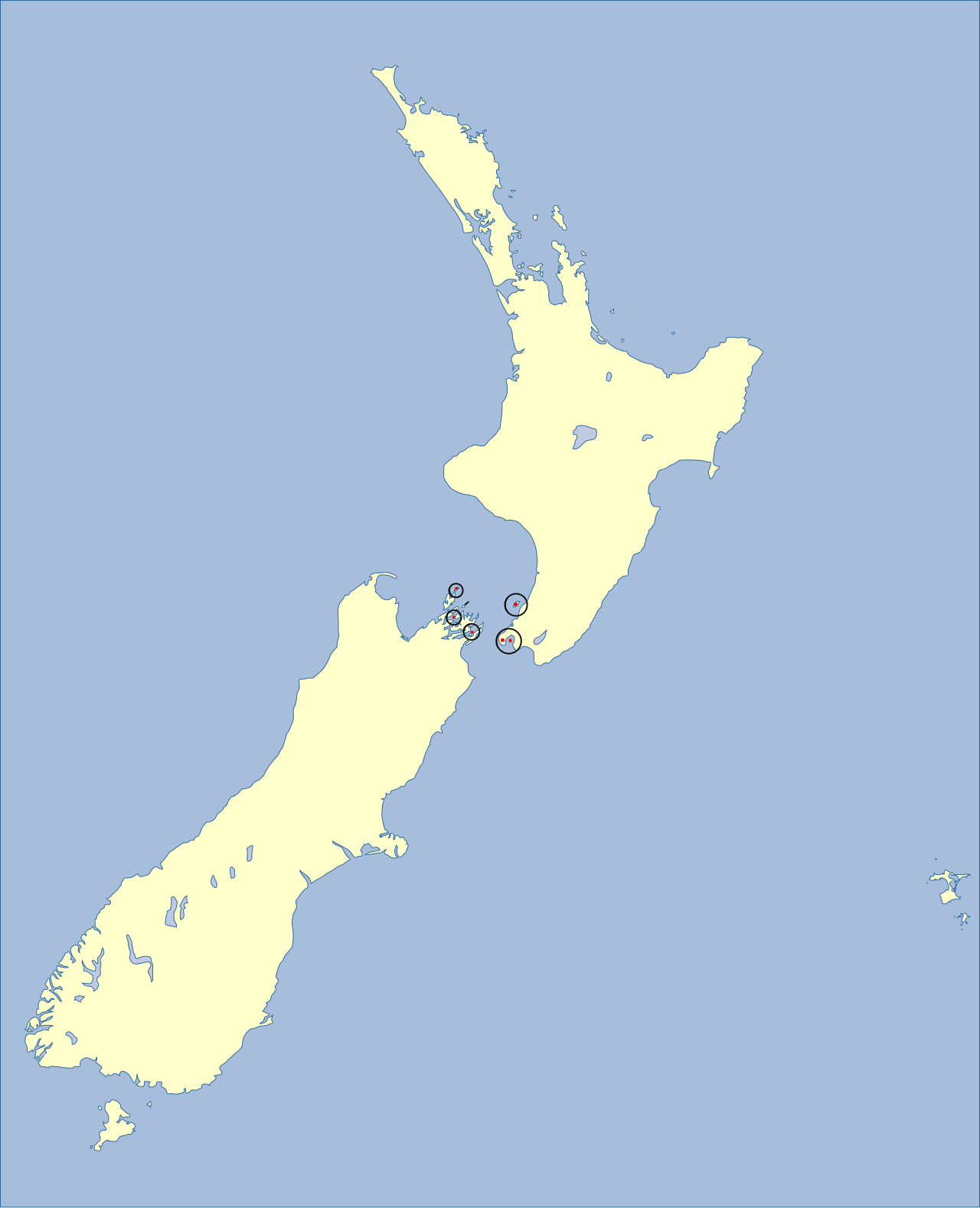

= Deinacrida rugosa =

Species of orthopteran insect

Deinacrida rugosa, commonly called the Cook Strait giant wētā or Stephens Island wētā, is a species of insect in the family Anostostomatidae. The scientific name Deinacrida means "terrible grasshopper" and rugosa means "wrinkled". It is endemic to New Zealand.

== Description ==
The Cook Strait giant wētā is one of the largest insects in the world, reaching up to 7 centimetres (2.8 in) long. The brownish-yellow body is bulky and heavily armoured, with the upper surface covered by a series of thickened, overlapping plates, which have black markings. Relative to the size of the head, the jaws are large, and the elongated hind legs have five or six large spines, and can be raised above the head in defence. The female is significantly larger than the male, and both sexes lack wings.

== Distribution and habitat ==
The Cook Strait giant wētā is found only in New Zealand, on the islands of the North, South and Middle Trio, Stephens, Maud, Matiu/Somes and Mana. In 2007, this species was reintroduced to mainland New Zealand, where it had been extinct for over 100 years, and is now found in Zealandia Wildlife Sanctuary in the North Island. It is found in open grassland, shrubland and forest margins.

== Biology ==
The Cook Strait giant wētā is nocturnal and feeds on the aerial parts of plants. During the day it conceals itself amongst grass in a temporary refuge that it makes in the soil surface, or under dead leaves, bark or stones. It emerges just after dusk, foraging on the ground or on low-growing bushes and shrubs, where it particularly favours tauhinu flowers (Cassinia leptophylla).

Owing to its solitary and nomadic lifestyle, the Cook Strait giant wētā's reproduction relies upon the male locating a receptive female. This search is facilitated by the strong scent produced by the wētā's body and by its faecal pellets, and can involve the male travelling over 250 metres in a single night. Once located, the male places a leg over the female's body and maintains contact until a daytime refuge is found. Here, mating occurs throughout the day and, if the weather is cool and wet, possibly throughout the night as well. The female subsequently lays around 200 eggs in the soil and dies. The eggs develop for a few months and hatch in the spring, with the juvenile wētā emerging fully developed. It takes most of the Cook Strait giant wētā's two-year lifespan to reach the full adult size, with growth taking place in a series of about nine moults over a 12- to 18-month period.

== Threats ==
A number of animals prey on the Cook Strait giant wētā, including birds and reptiles such as the tuatara. As a defence against predators the Cook Strait giant wētā will raise its spiked legs over its head and wave them up and down while making a hissing sound by rapidly rubbing together the overlapping plates on its upper body.

Historically, the Cook Strait giant wētā was found on mainland New Zealand as well as many off-shore islands, but the introduction of mammalian predators such as the black rat (Rattus rattus), and the clearance of much of its habitat, led to the contraction of its range to just a few small, "rat-free" islands in the Cook Strait. A combination of its ground-dwelling lifestyle, large size, and strong scent make it particularly vulnerable to predation, and therefore, accidental introductions of mammalian predators to the offshore islands could be catastrophic for its survival.

== Conservation ==
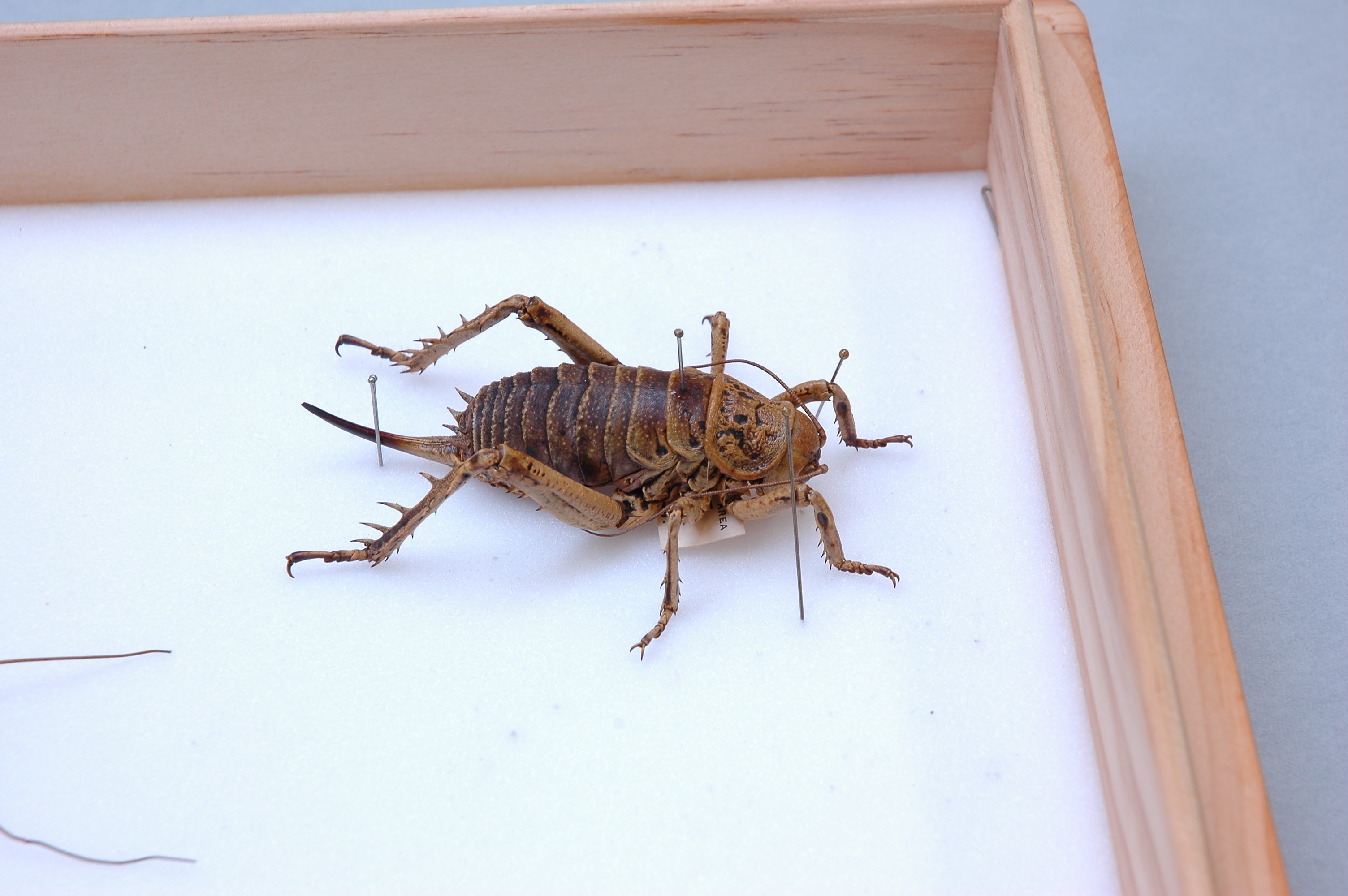
Deinacrida rugosa specimen

Introductions of the Cook Strait giant wētā to Mana Island in 1976, Matiu / Somes Island in 1996, and, most recently, Zealandia Wildlife Sanctuary in the North Island in 2007 have helped to greatly expand this vulnerable species' range. In addition, on Mana Island, the removal of cattle and eradication of mice has dramatically increased Cook Strait giant wētā abundance. With the success of these introductions, the New Zealand Department of Conservation plans to continue to introduce the Cook Strait giant wētā to new island habitats, while ensuring that its existing island habitats remain protected against the threat of predator invasion.

The Matiu-Somes Island transfer was undertaken in 1996 with two separate translocations taking place. In total 62 individual wētā were released and were sourced from Mana Island. Surveys of the Cook Strait giant wētā were undertaken on Matiu-Somes Island in 2013 and 2015.

The species has been introduced to Zealandia Wildlife Sanctuary. By using a specially designed fence to exclude mammalian predators, the sanctuary hopes to re-establish an environment similar to that which existed on New Zealand before the arrival of humans, where species such as the Cook Strait giant wētā can thrive once more.

The Cook Strait giant wētā was assessed by the Department of Conservation as "At Risk: Relict", with a stable but small population.
