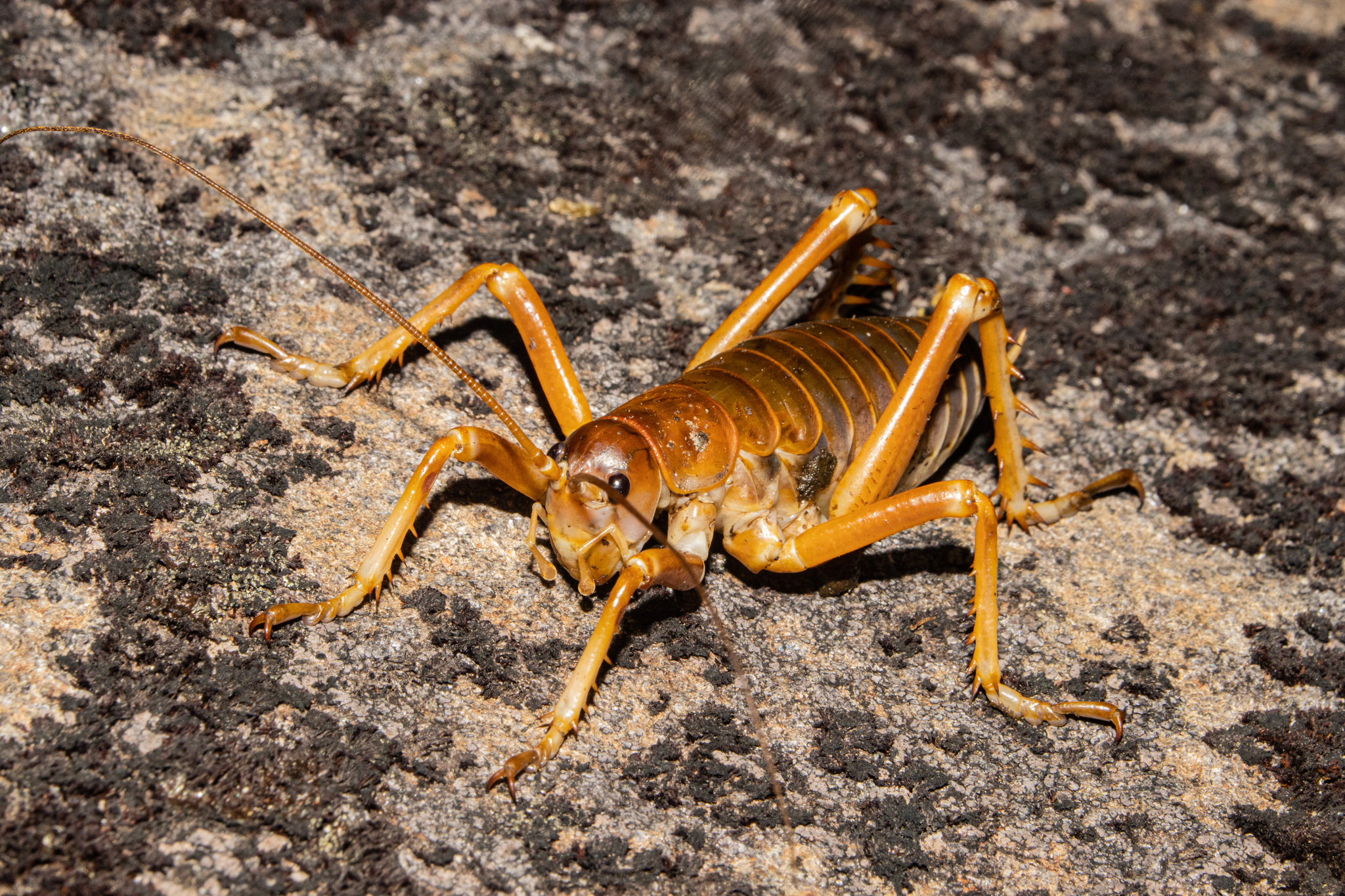

Conservation status
- Nationally Endangered (NZ TCS)

Scientific classification
- Kingdom: Animalia
- Phylum: Arthropoda
- Clade: Pancrustacea
- Class: Insecta
- Order: Orthoptera
- Suborder: Ensifera
- Family: Anostostomatidae
- Genus: Deinacrida
- Species: D. pluvialis

Binomial name
- Deinacrida pluvialis Gibbs, 1999
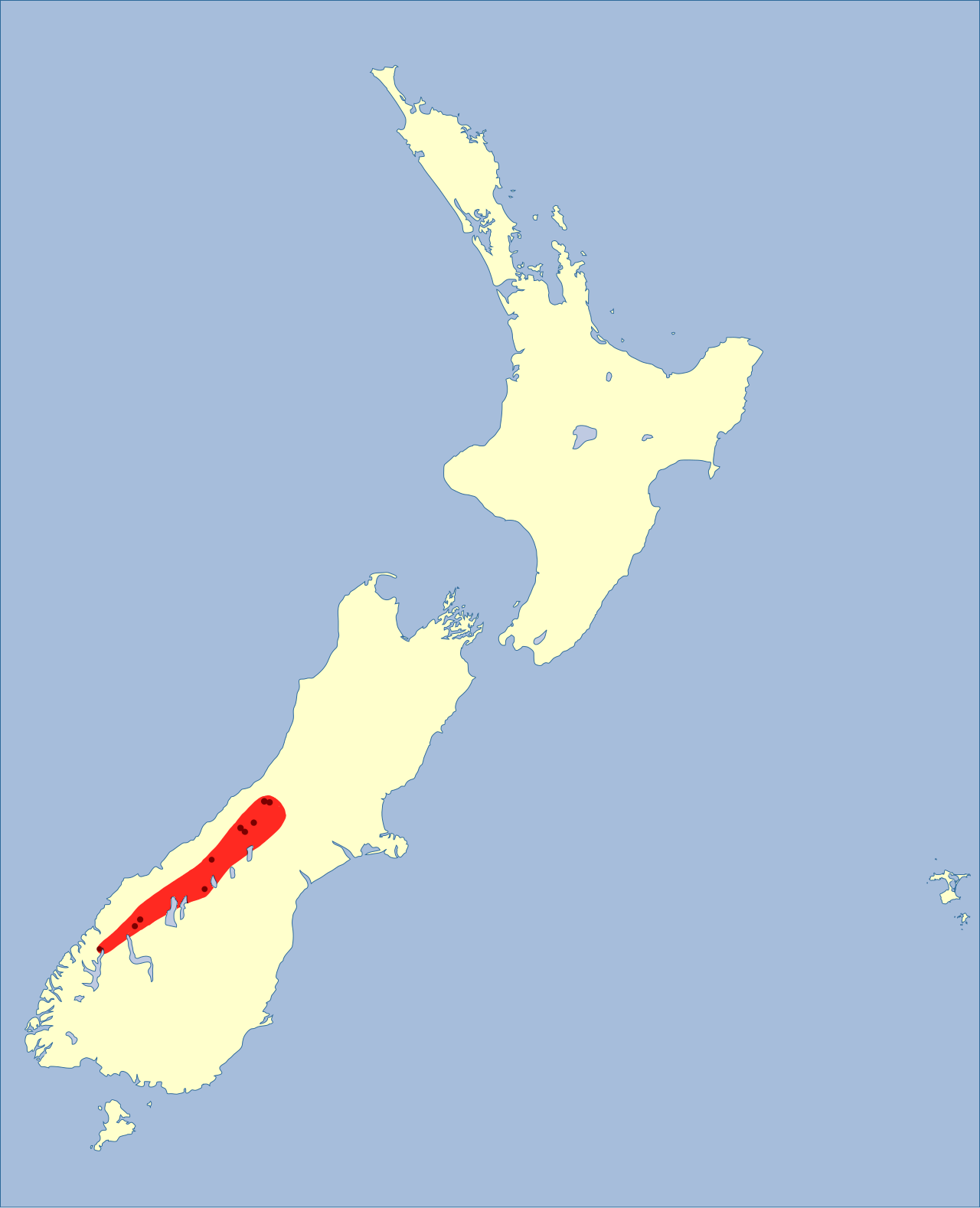

= Deinacrida pluvialis =

Species of orthopteran insect

Deinacrida pluvialis is a species of insect in family Anostostomatidae. It is endemic to New Zealand. This wētā lives in alpine and subalpine areas above 700m asl on the western side of the Southern Alps. . The abundance of Deinacrida pluvialis has declined over 30 years, and it is now considered threatened, Nationally Endangered. Their color is usually orange, probably because of their habitat which have moss and dead plant that have the same color. They were found in the same range as Mt. Cook.
