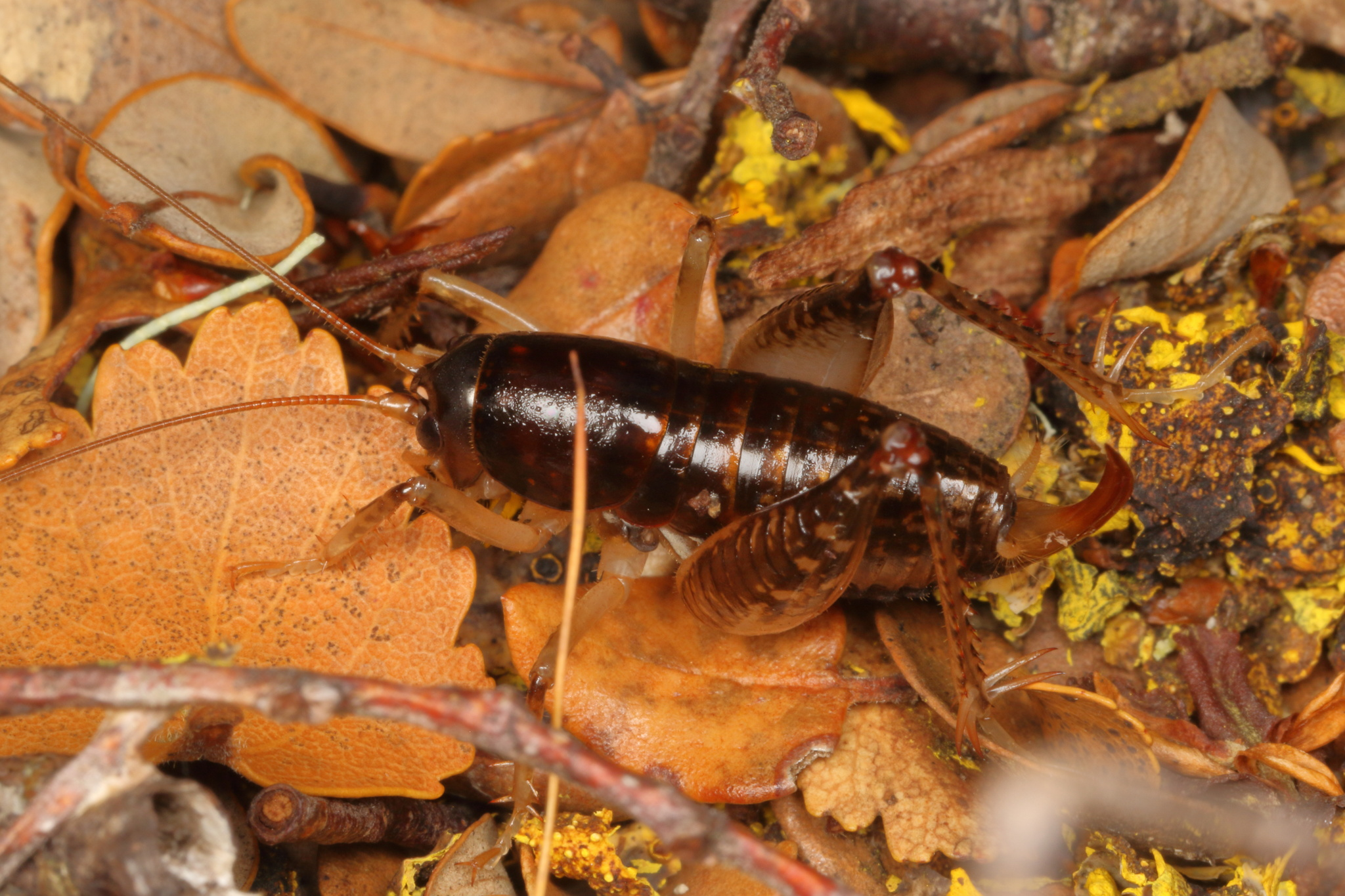

Conservation status
- Not Threatened (NZ TCS)

Scientific classification
- Kingdom: Animalia
- Phylum: Arthropoda
- Class: Insecta
- Order: Orthoptera
- Suborder: Ensifera
- Family: Anostostomatidae
- Genus: Anderus
- Species: A. nox

Binomial name
- Anderus nox (Taylor Smith, Trewick & Morgan-Richards, 2016)

Synonyms
- Hemiandrus nox Taylor Smith, Trewick & Morgan-Richards, 2016

= Anderus nox =

Species of orthopteran insect

Anderus nox, the night ground wētā, is a species of ground wētā endemic to New Zealand. During the day, this wētā hides in burrows in the soil and is active only at night (they are nocturnal). The species is found in native forests in North and South Island. Females of this species have medium-long curved ovipositers to lay their eggs in the soil. Unlike some ground wētā species, A. nox does not show maternal care.

== Taxonomy ==
Anderus nox was first described in 2016, but had been referred to in previous publications by an informal (tag) name (Hemiandrus 'alius'). The species name comes from Nox, the Roman goddess of the night. In 2024 a new genus was created (Anderus) because the New Zealand species of Hemiandrus were not monophyletic.

== Habitat/distribution ==
Anderus nox is endemic to the North and South Island of New Zealand, but restricted to mature native forest. This species is most abundant in North-west Nelson. They are a nocturnal species and found in burrows in the ground during the day. Anderus nox is sympatric with three other Anderus species and is host to the intracellular bacteria Wollbachia.

== Conservation ==
Under the New Zealand Threat Classification System, this species is listed as "Not Threatened".

== Diet ==
80% of the diet of Anderus nox is invertebrate material, making it primarily carnivorous. This species has been observed eating invertebrates such as cicada

== Morphology ==
This species is very similar in appearance to the three species within the maculifrons-complex. Adult females have a medium-long length, strongly curved ovipositor with dark patches at its base. The head and body of adults are small and dark brown with a cream and brown clypeus; sometimes with small pale patches on the pronotum. The three apical segments of the maxillary palps have fine microsetae. The spines on their legs can be used to distinguish them from sympatric species: their mid tibiae has three spines along the inferior retrolateral angle (excluding apical spine), and their hind tibiae has no inferior articulated spines. In addition male teminalia are unique.
