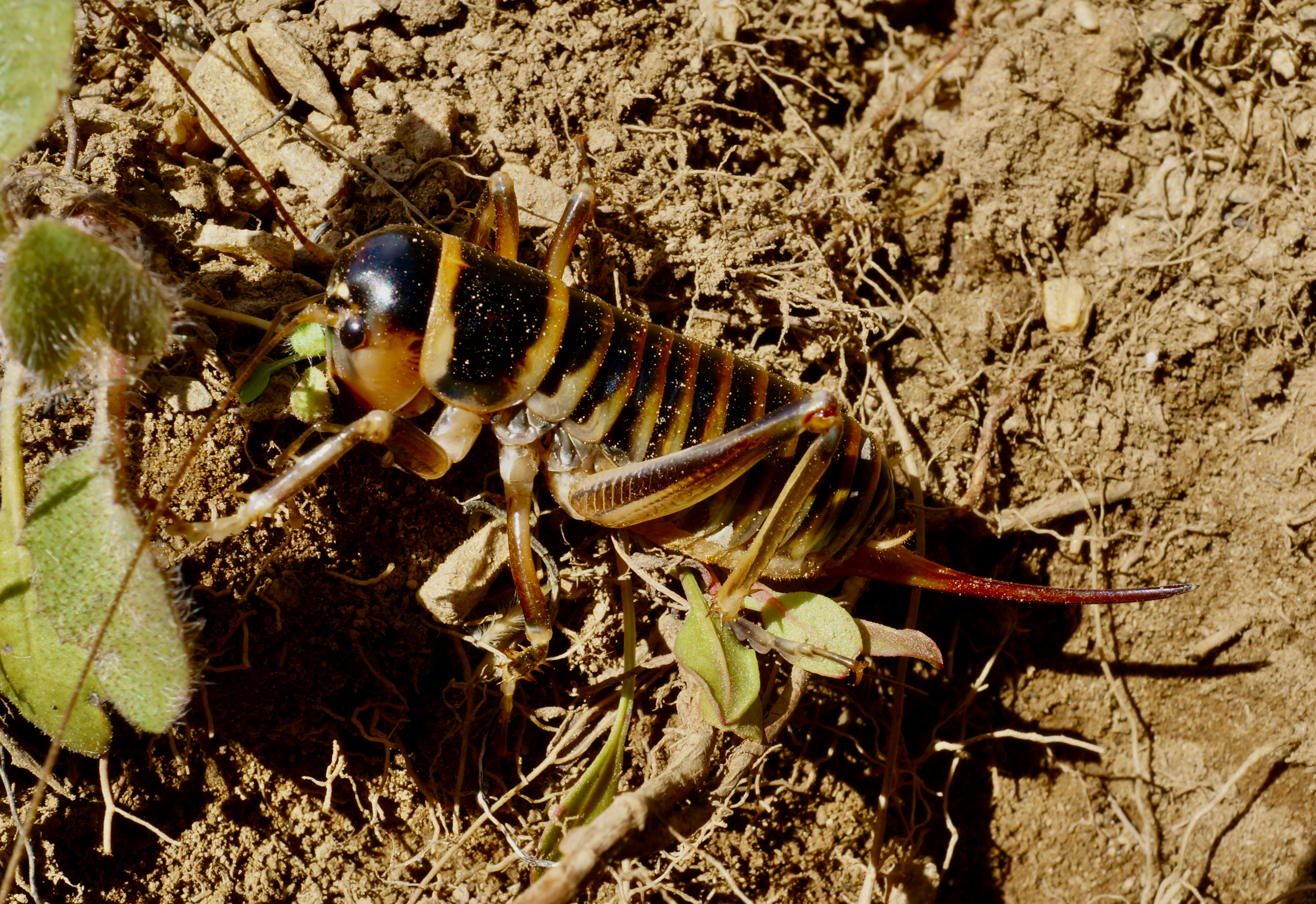
- Adult female near Bannockburn, South Island, New Zealand

Conservation status
- Not Threatened (NZ TCS)

Scientific classification
- Kingdom: Animalia
- Phylum: Arthropoda
- Clade: Pancrustacea
- Class: Insecta
- Order: Orthoptera
- Suborder: Ensifera
- Family: Anostostomatidae
- Genus: Hemiandrus
- Species: H. focalis

Binomial name
- Hemiandrus focalis (Hutton, 1896)

Synonyms
- Zealandosandrus maculifrons sensu Salmon 1950

= Hemiandrus focalis =

Species of orthopteran insect

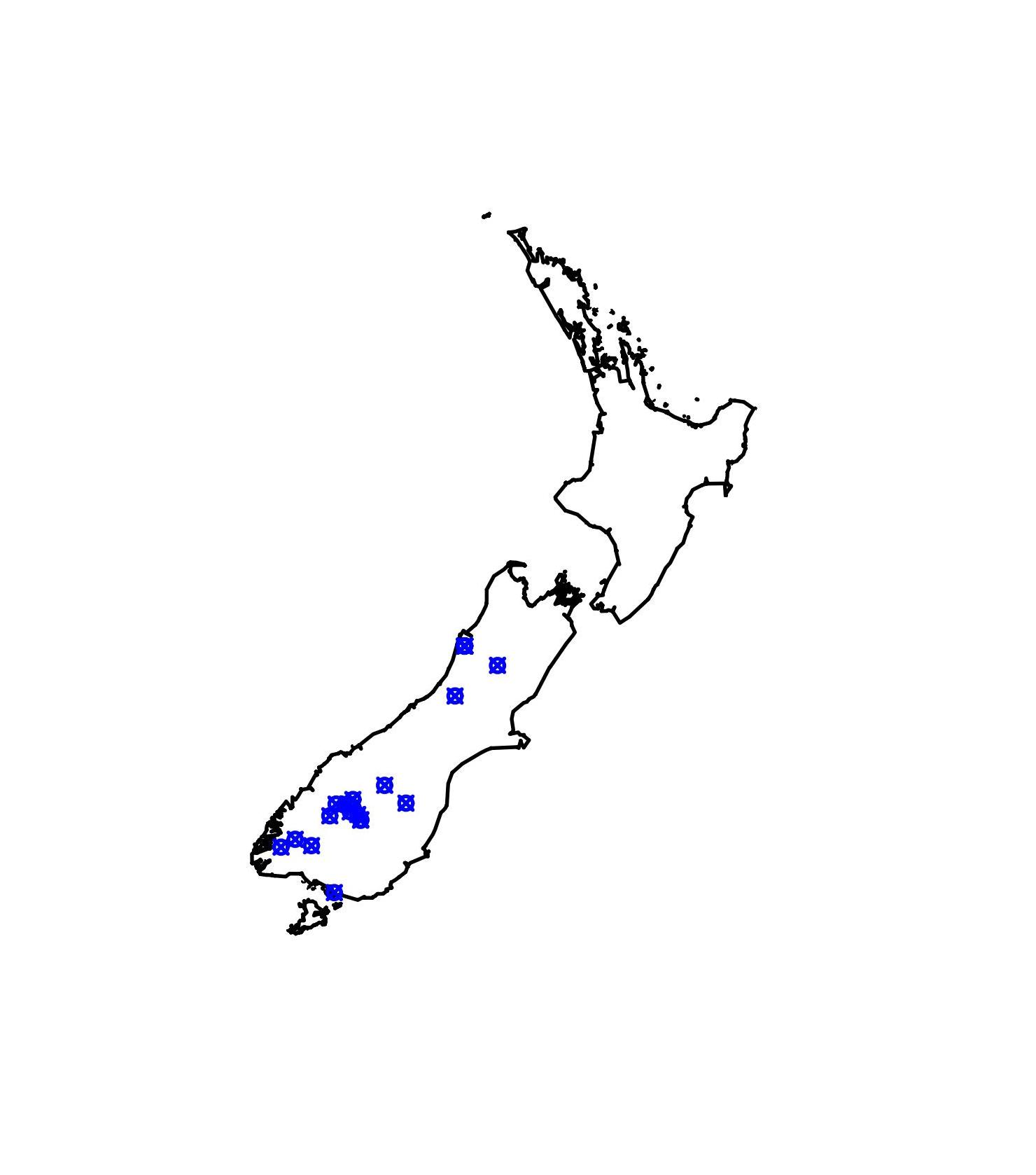
Distribution map of Hemiandrus focalis in New Zealand based on observations from iNaturalist 2021.

Hemiandrus focalis is a species of ground wētā endemic to New Zealand. This flightless orthopteran lives in the mountains of the South Island. The species can be distinguished from other ground wētā by their three superior retrolateral spines on their mid tibia and females' long ovipositors. This omnivorous ground wētā species is listed as "not threatened" by the New Zealand Department of Conservation.

== Taxonomy ==
Hemiandrus focalis was formally placed in the genus Zealandosandrus by Salmon in 1950. The genus Zealandosandrus was formed to separate species with the distinct traits of long ovipositors and the absence of a modified 6th abdominal sternite in female wētā. However, this genus is now regarded as synonymous with Hemiandrus, as some ground wētā species have intermediate length ovipositers, and Hemiandrus focalis has weakly developed paramedian lobes on the female 6th sternite.

== Morphology ==
This species can be distinguished from other ground wētā by their three superior retrolateral spines on their mid tibia and females have relatively long ovipositors. Ovipositor length vary in different ground wētā species. Hemiandrus focalis is one of about ten Hemiandrus species with females possessing long ovipositors. The tarsus of H. focalis is also described as bare with only a few erect setae.

== Habitat and distribution ==
This species is endemic to New Zealand and lives in the mountain of the South Island. All species within the genus Hemiandrus are nocturnal. Individuals of H. focalis are found during the day in soil burrows in native forest or in burrows of stony silts in open habitat. The habitat of Hemiandrus focalis extends into high elevation in the alpine zone above the tree line. This species are distributed across the mountains of New Zealand's South Island and also found present on Codfish Island.

== Diet ==
Hemiandrus focalis is one of the Hemiandrus species that has an omnivorous diet. Omnivorous ground wētā such as H. maia are found to consume fruits, seeds and other invertebrates.

== Mating and breeding ==
Hemiandrus focalis lay their eggs in the ground similar to the suborder Ensifera. The long ovipositors in the females suggest that they do not have maternal care. This species may take three years to reach maturity.

Nuptial gifting occurs in Hemiandrus species where the male attaches a spermatophylax with the sperm ampulla onto the female when mating. Although the mating process of the H. focalis has not been recorded specifically, Hemiandrus species with long ovipositors have been recorded to have a spermatophylax attached to the sperm ampulla.

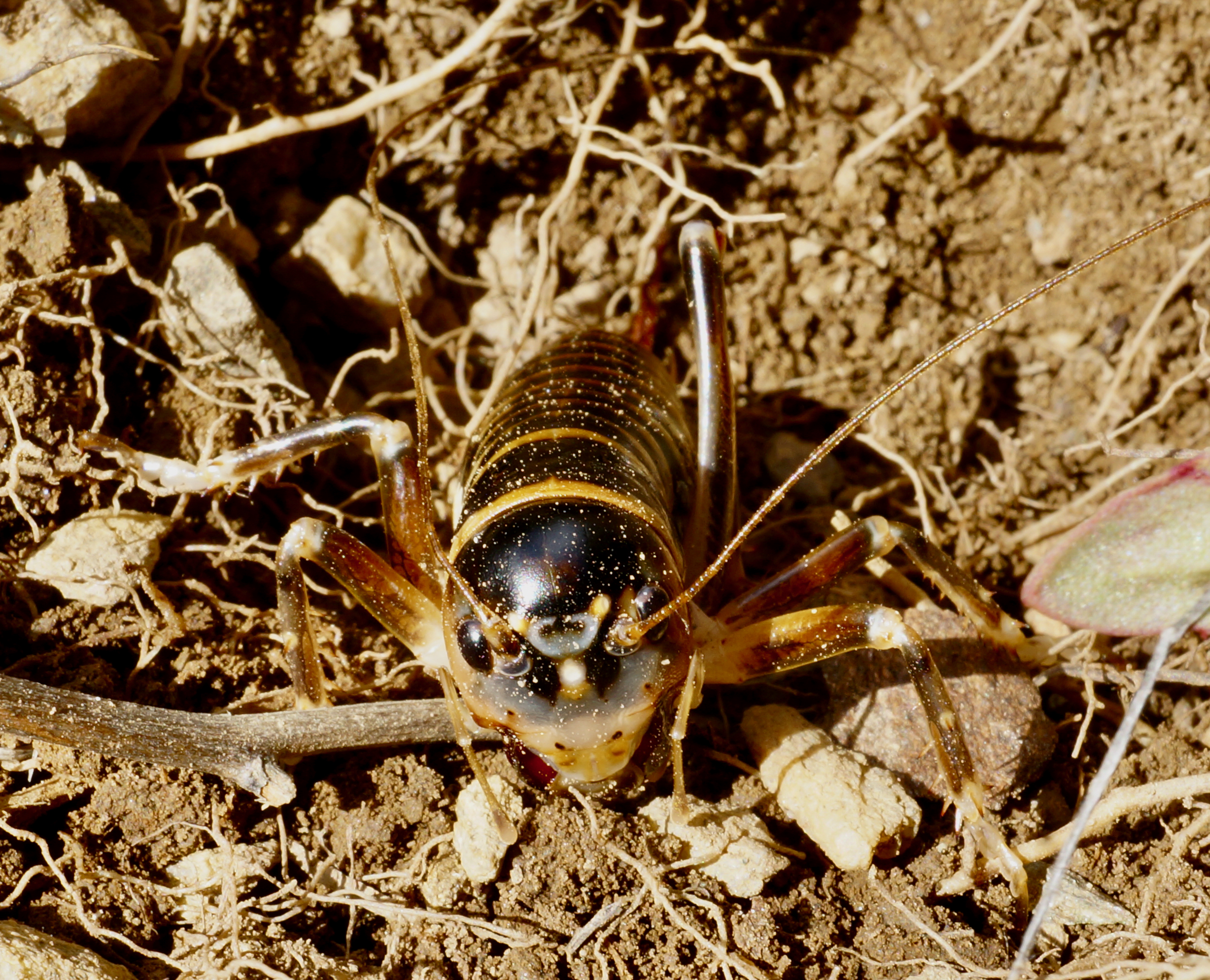
Female adult from the front

== Conservation ==
Under the New Zealand Threat Classification System, this species is listed as "Not Threatened". Ground wētā are important as they are part of the diet of native kiwi. They are also eaten by introduced mammals in New Zealand such as hedgehogs and stoats.
