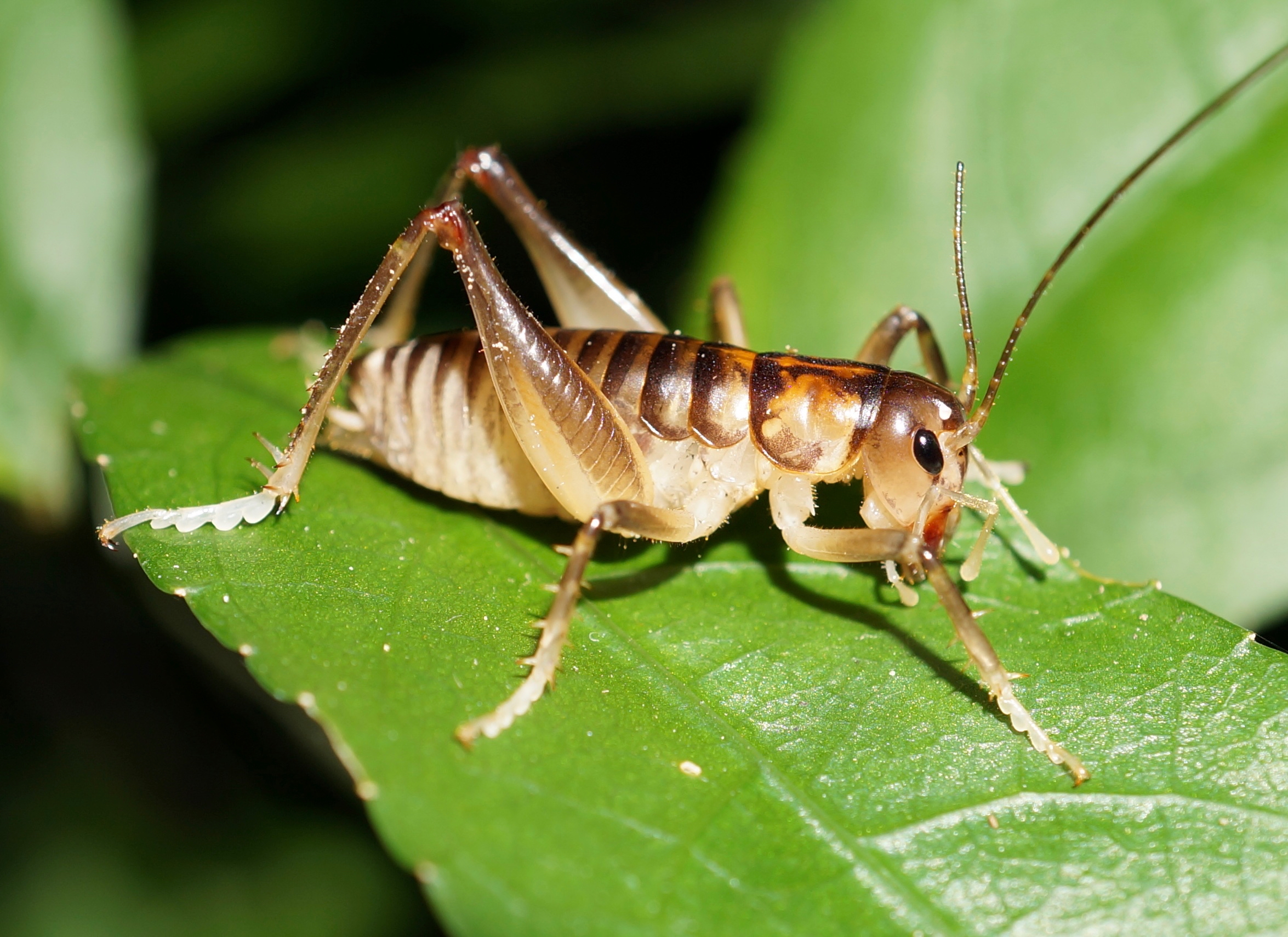
- Hemiandrus pallitarsis

Scientific classification
- Kingdom: Animalia
- Phylum: Arthropoda
- Clade: Pancrustacea
- Class: Insecta
- Order: Orthoptera
- Suborder: Ensifera
- Family: Anostostomatidae
- Genus: Hemiandrus; Ander, 1938

Species
- See text

Synonyms
- Zealandosandrus Salmon, 1950

= Hemiandrus =

Genus of orthopteran insects

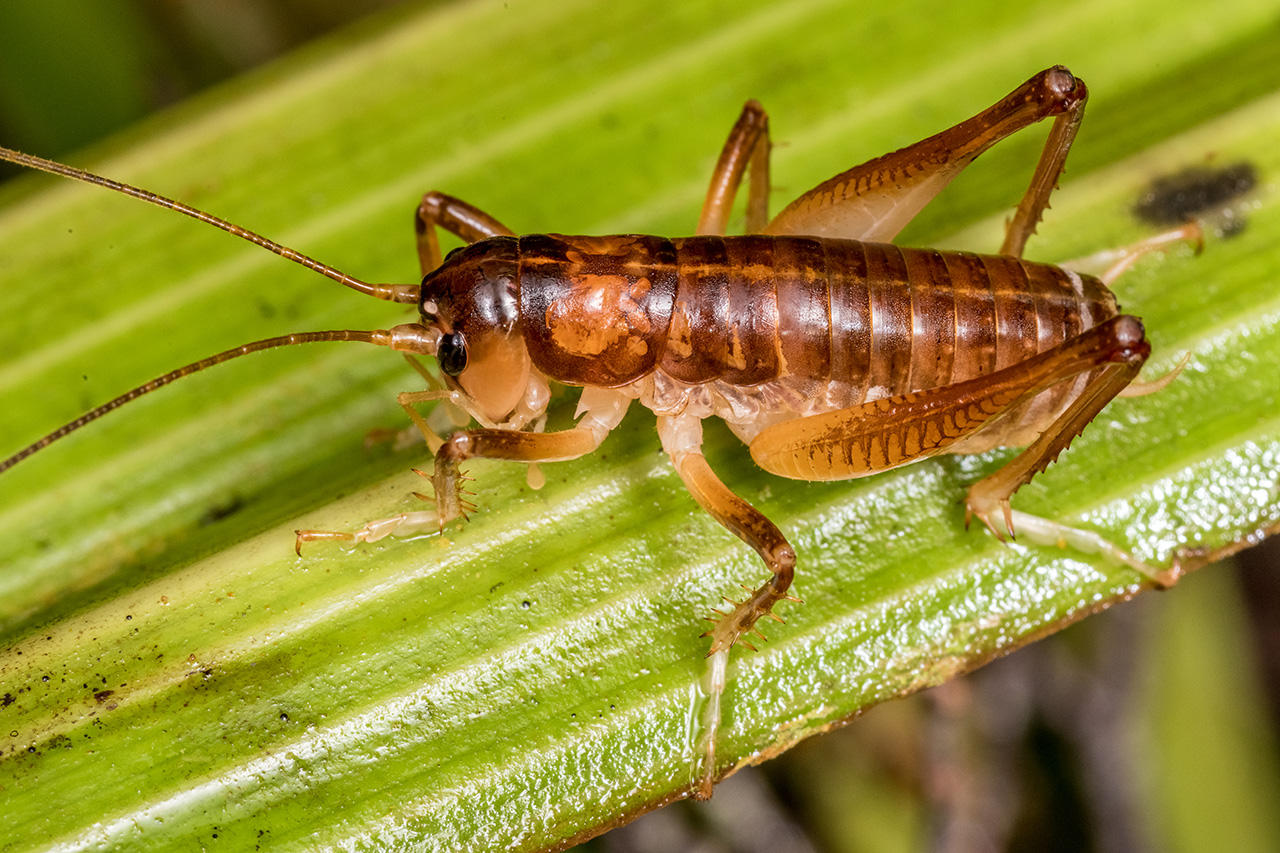
Hemiandrus electra male

Hemiandrus is a genus of wētā in the family Anostostomatidae. In New Zealand they are known as ground wētā due to their burrowing lifestyle. Hemiandrus wētā are nocturnal, and reside in these burrows during the day. Ground wētā seal the entrance of their burrow during the day with a soil plug or door so that their burrow is concealed. Ground wētā adults are smaller than other types of wētā, with the unusual trait of having either long or short ovipositors, depending on the species. The name of this genus comes from this trait as hemi- mean half and -andrus means male, as the species where the female has a short ovipositor can sometimes be mistaken for a male. This genus has a diverse diet, depending on the species.

== Taxonomy ==
The genus Hemiandrus was originally described by Kjell Ander in 1938. In 2024 a new genus was created (Anderus) reducing Hemiandrus to eleven described species. Five more species were described in 2026. Hemiandrus is one of the most species rich genera of the New Zealand Anostostomatidae, and sister to two Australian genera (Penalva and the winged Exogryllacis). Ten undescribed species of this genus are said to be in Australia, however molecular genetic analyses show that these taxa represent a separate lineage, therefore their Australasian distribution is under debate.

== Morphology ==
The genus Hemiandrus include the smallest wētā species, with adult individual body size no more than 7 millimetres, and weighing less than a gram. The largest Hemiandrus species has a body length of almost 30mm. These wētā have no typical tympanum, and instead are able to detect sound through their cuticle, which is adaptive for their underground lifestyle. Some species in this genus have unusually short ovipositors for orthopterans, the species with this morphological trait exhibit maternal care, which is uncommon as it occurs only in five families within the order Orthoptera.

== Sexual Dimorphism ==
The genus Hemiandrus shows sexual dimorphism between male and females in size, behaviour, and potentially abundance. Females’ pronotum and femur are significantly larger than males, but males have a larger pronotum to femur ratio. Abundance has been observed to be higher in males, but has been taken from a single, small dataset. Higher male abundance would coincide with other species in the family Anostostomatidae, and can be reflected in their post-copulation traditions of mate-guarding from males.

== Diet ==
The diet of these wētā depends on the species, H. maia is omnivorous, eating fruit and invertebrates. Other ground wētā species however have been shown to be mainly herbivorous, eating apricots and various grass species.

== Distribution ==
- Australia (Undescribed species)
- New Zealand - This genus are found throughout the North and South Island, and even on some of the offshore islands of New Zealand. (See distribution map http://wetageta.massey.ac.nz/Text%20files/groundweta.html). They are found in lowland forests, riverbeds, alpine herb fields, and suburban gardens. If this genus also occurs in Australia (which there is debate about), then this is the only non-endemic genus of wētā in New Zealand.

== Diversification ==
Wētā in New Zealand are made up of three major groups: Hemideina & Deinacrida (tree-giant wētā), Hemiandrus & Anderus (Ground wētā), Anisoura & Motuweta (tusked wētā). Each genus in New Zealand is sister to genera in Australia and New Caledonia. Molecular dating evidence supports divergence of Anostostomatidae occurring at the Gondwanan breakup, with the species later dispersing across the Tasman sea.

== Behaviour ==
Several Hemiandrus species have been recorded stridulating, despite lacking the tympanum 'ears' present in other wētā genera. The sounds produced are inaudible to humans and is detected through the cuticle. Many of the 'short ovipositor' species have been found to exhibit maternal care with females laying eggs in their burrows and remaining with the eggs and even nymphs while they develop.

== Courtship Behaviour ==
Hemiandrus perform a local courtship behaviour called substrate drumming. A wanting mate will drum its abdomen on a substrate, until they get reciprocating drumming or move to a new location. Wētā of the genus Hemiandrus have tympanal organs in their foreleg tibia, made up of four sensory components (subgenual organ, intermediate organ, crista acustica, and accessory organ) contained within the tympanal membrane. There are 90 scolopidial sensilla in all four legs. These organs are designed to detect cuticular vibrations through the ground, as ground wētā live in underground burrows, the use of a substrate-vibration communication system is necessary.

== Copulation ==
In Hemiandrus, copulation differs from other wētā in the family Anostostomatidae, with the presence of the female’s secondary copulatory structure. Hemiandrus assume typical ensiferan copulation position, with the female mounted above the male. The male then attaches the dorsal part of his genitalia to the female’s secondary copulatory structure on the underside of the female’s mid-abdomen. Without detaching, the male stretches the ventral part of his genitalia to the female’s primary genitalia, depositing a spermatophore. The male then deposits a spermatophylax onto her abdomen, in front of the secondary structure. Once the spermatophore is deposited, the male detaches from the female, she bends her head toward her abdomen and grasps the spermatophylax. A larger secondary copulatory structure on a female has positive correlation with a larger clutch of eggs, suggesting that these copulatory structures evolved via sexual selection to acquire nuptial gifts from males.

== Post-mating behaviour ==
The male stays near the female to actively mate guard until she has consumed the entirety of the spermatophylax. The spermatophylax has nutritional value and takes approximately an hour to eat, providing food for the female and ample time for sperm transfer to occur. The larger the spermatophylax is, the longer it takes for the female to eat, and therefore gives more time for mate guarding to ensure no competing males engage in copulation. This incentivises large investment into the production of the spermatophylax from the male to increase the chances of successful copulation, suggesting that a larger spermatophylax is a result of sexual selection.

== Hemiandrus in New Zealand ==
There are 16 described species in the genus Hemiandus and it is likely undescribed New Zealand species exist. Ground wētā are eaten by native species such as the wattle birds, kiwi, but also by introduced species such as mice, stoats, cats, and hedgehogs. Of the described species in this genus, half have a restricted range, but most are common and widespread, and are not thought to be endangered (as per the New Zealand Department of Conservation).

== Species ==
- Hemiandrus bilobatus Ander, 1938
- Hemiandrus briarae Trewick & Morgan-Richards 2026
- Hemiandrus celaeno Trewick, Taylor-Smith & Morgan-Richards 2020
- Hemiandrus dryadis Trewick & Morgan-Richards 2026
- Hemiandrus electra Taylor Smith, Morgan-Richards & Trewick, 2013
- Hemiandrus fabella Trewick & Morgan-Richards 2026
- Hemiandrus focalis (Hutton, 1897)
- Hemiandrus jacinda Trewick, 2021
- Hemiandrus johnsi Trewick & Morgan-Richards 2026
- Hemiandrus lanceolatus (Walker, 1869)
- Hemiandrus maia Taylor-Smith, Morgan-Richards & Trewick, 2013
- Hemiandrus merope Trewick, Taylor-Smith & Morgan-Richards 2020
- Hemiandrus pallitarsis (Walker, 1869)
- Hemiandrus sterope Trewick, Taylor-Smith & Morgan-Richards 2020
- Hemiandrus superbus Jewell, 2007
- Hemiandrus taygete Trewick, Taylor-Smith & Morgan-Richards 2020

Species of the genus Hemiandrus can be distinguished from similar ground wētā in the genus Anderus by examination of palps

Previously in the genus Hemiandrus:

- Anderus brucei Taylor-Smith, Trewick & Morgan-Richards, 2016
- Anderus fiordensis (Salmon, 1950)
- Anderus luna Taylor-Smith, Trewick & Morgan-Richards, 2016
- Anderus maculifrons (Walker, 1869)
- Hemiandrus nitaweta Jewell, 2007
- Anderus nox Taylor-Smith, Trewick & Morgan-Richards, 2016
- Anderus subantarcticus (Salmon, 1950)

Possibly also:

- Hemiandrus monstrosus Salmon, 1950 (listed as valid in the Orthoptera Species File, as a synonym by other secondary sources)
