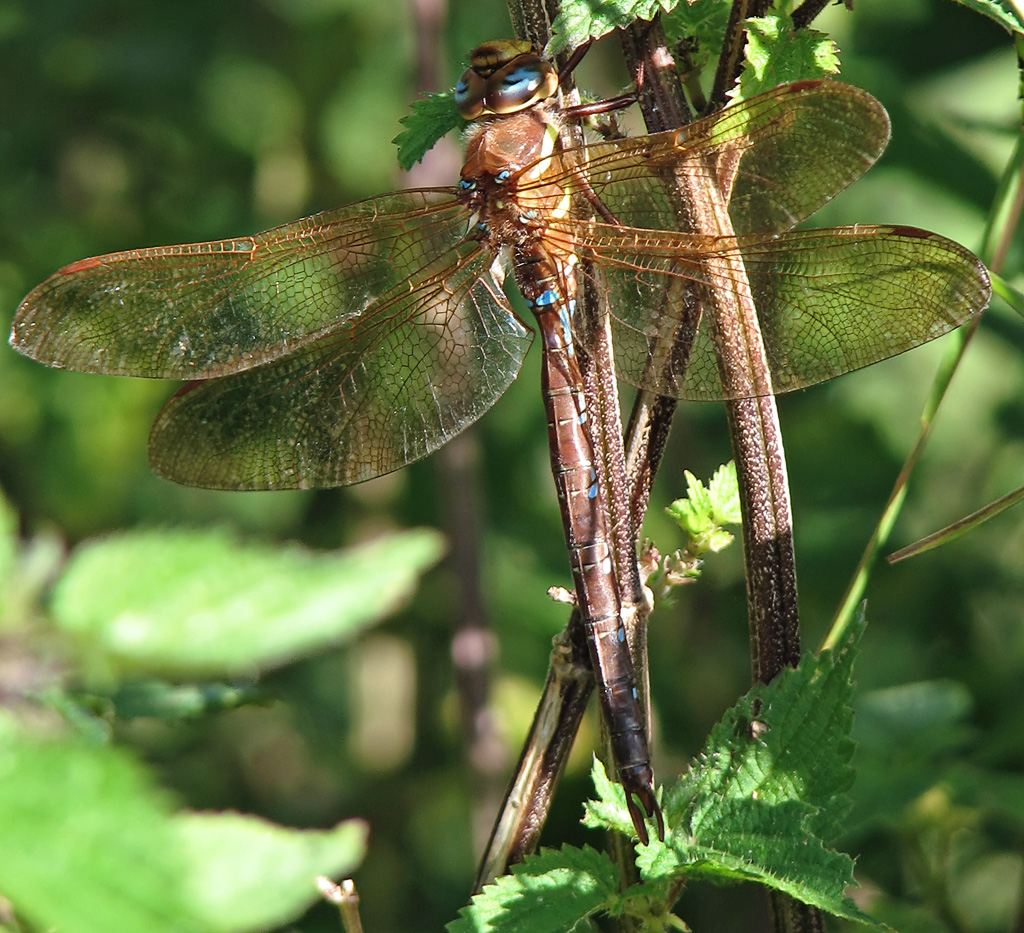
- Male
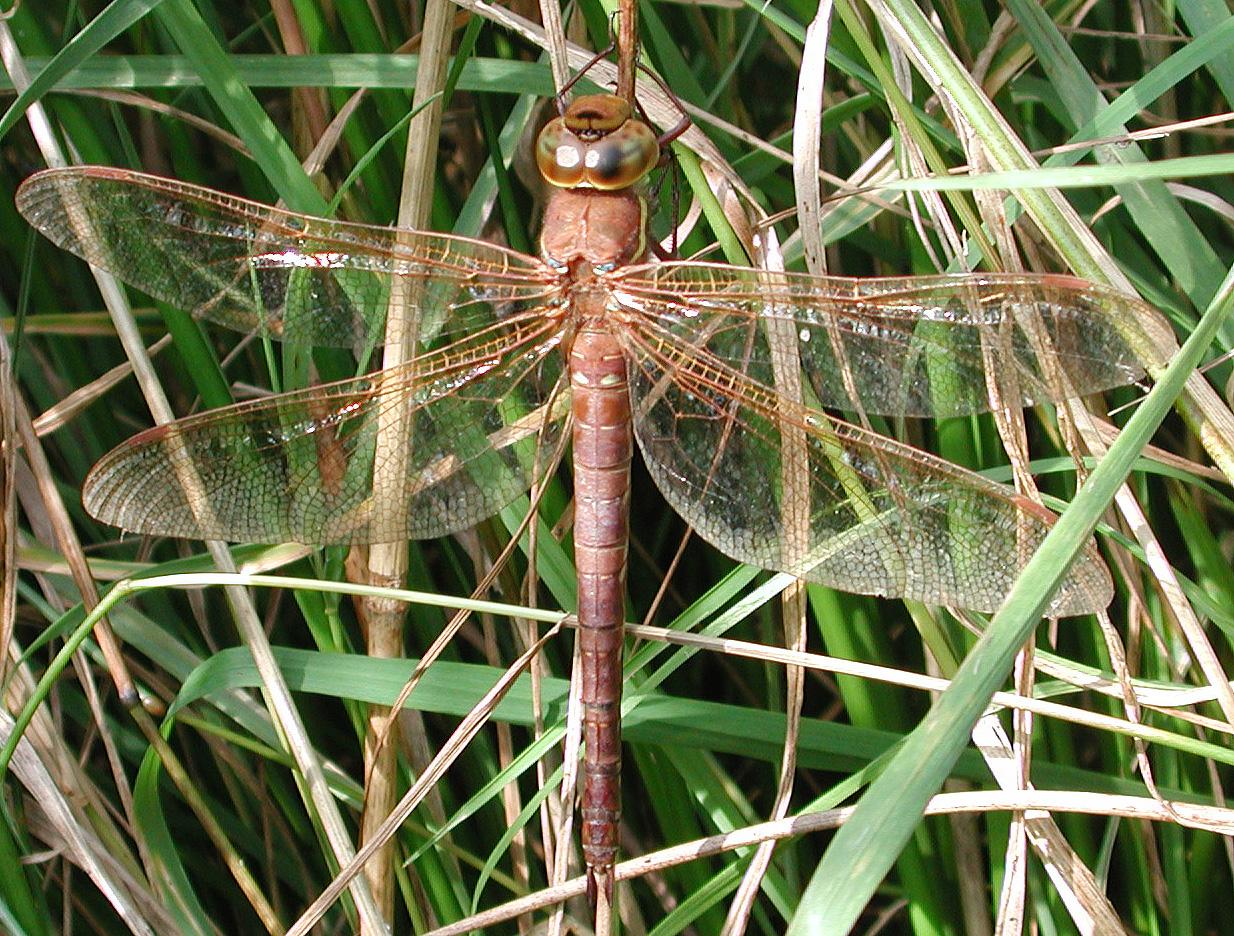
- Female

Conservation status
- Least Concern (IUCN 3.1)

Scientific classification
- Kingdom: Animalia
- Phylum: Arthropoda
- Clade: Pancrustacea
- Class: Insecta
- Order: Odonata
- Suborder: Anisoptera
- Family: Aeshnidae
- Genus: Aeshna
- Species: A. grandis

Binomial name
- Aeshna grandis (Linnaeus, 1758)
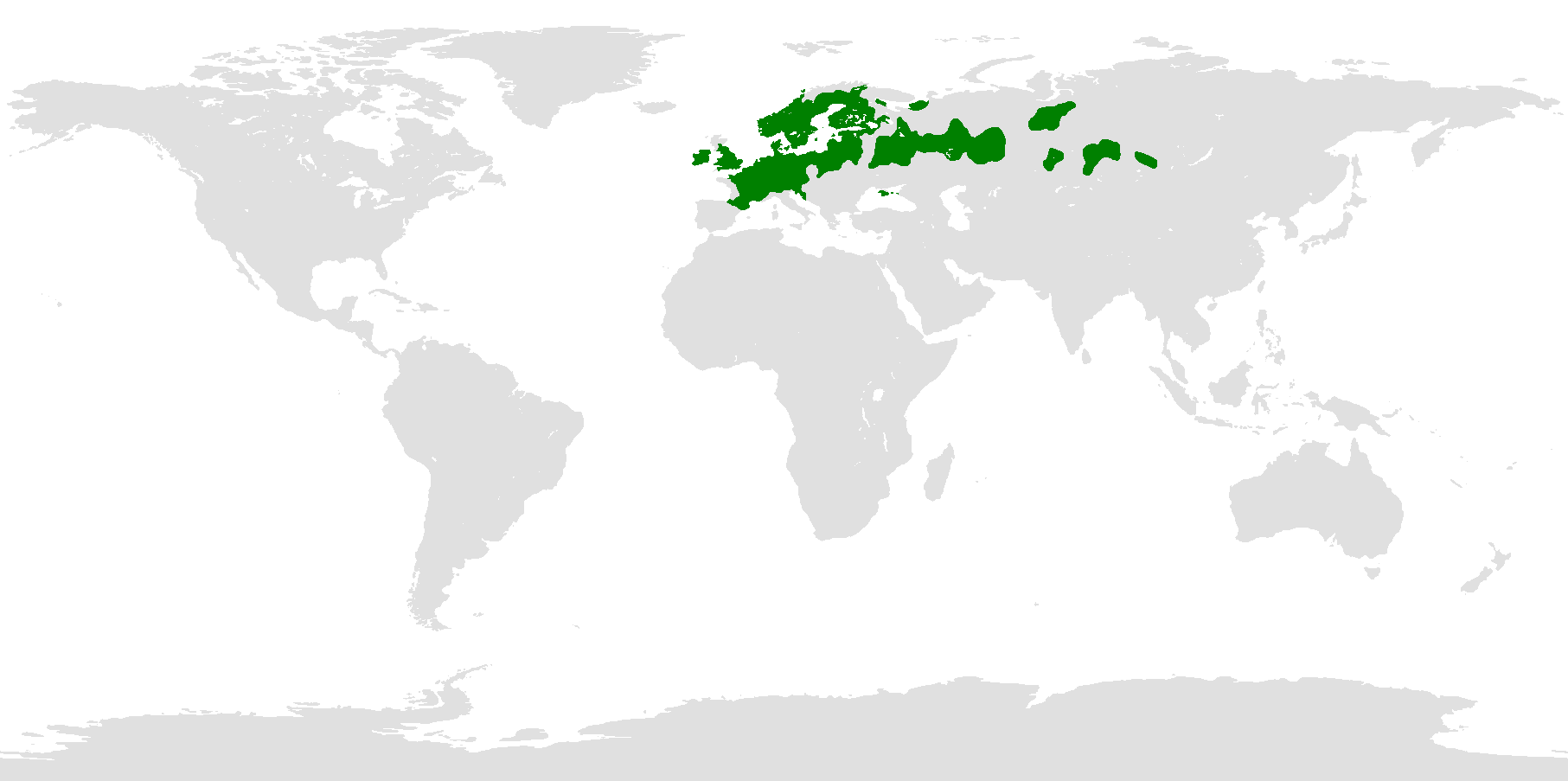
- Range of Aeshna grandis

Synonyms
- Libellula quadrifasciata O. F. Müller, 1764; Libellula nobilis O. F. Müller, 1767; Libellula rufa O. F. Müller, 1767 (nec Rambur, 1842); Libellula flavipennis Retzius, 1783; Aeshna linnaei Ander, 1953

= Brown hawker =

Species of dragonfly

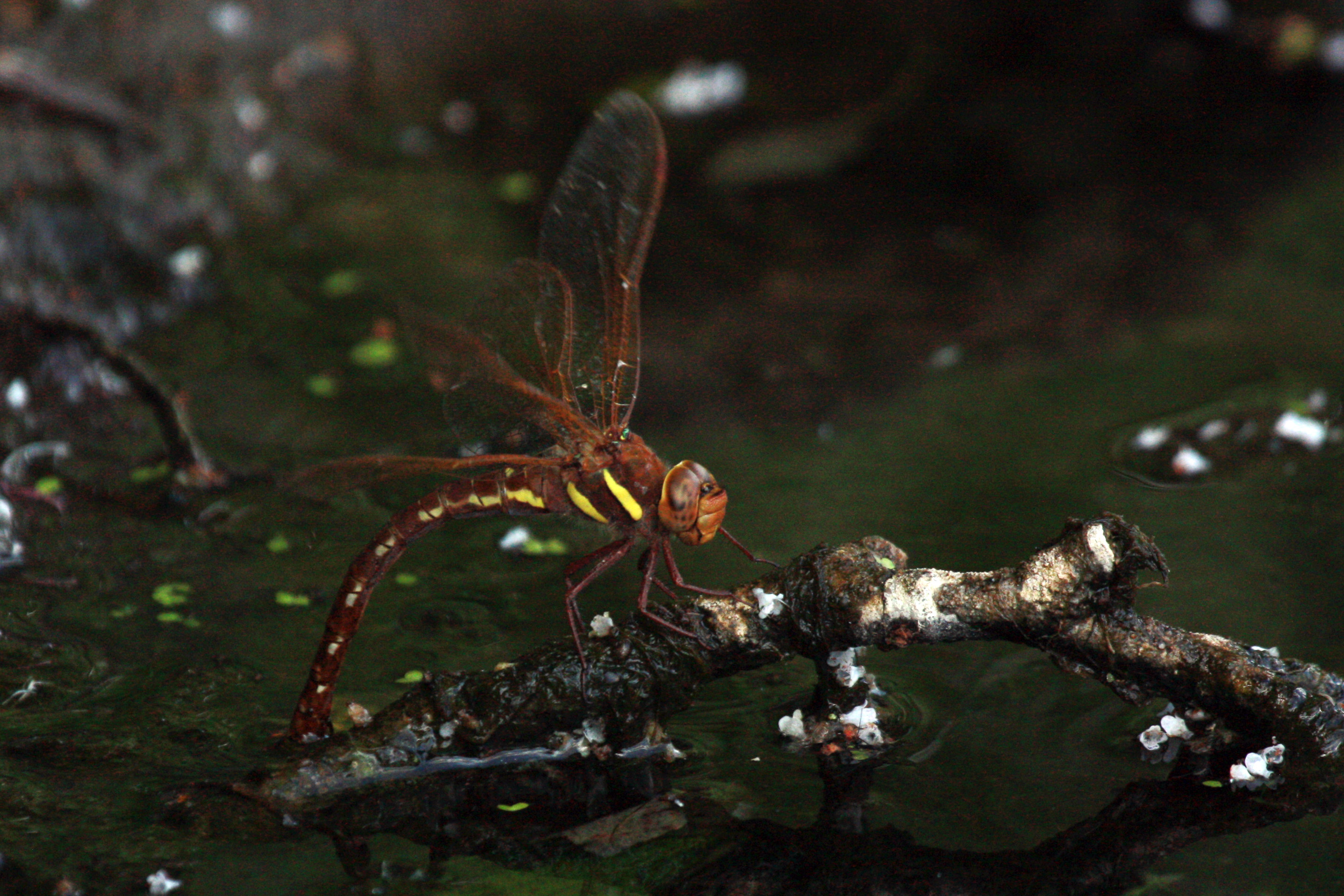
Female ovipositing

The brown hawker (Aeshna grandis) is a species of large Palearctic dragonfly belonging to the family Aeshnidae, the hawkers. This species is found in Europe and temperate Asia, except the far east of Asia.

== Taxonomy ==
The brown hawker was first formally described as Libellula grandis by Carl Linnaeus in the 10 edition of Systema Naturae published in 1758. It is now classified in the genus Aeshna in the family Aeshnidae, the hawkers, in the order Odonata, the dragonflies and damselflies. This species is the type species of the genus Aeshna.

== Description ==
The brown hawker is a large dragonfly with a body length of 73 mm (2.9 in). The body is brown marked with yellow stripes in the thorax and the wings are tinged brown. The males have small markings of blue and yellow and are noticeably waisted, and the females have small yellow markings. The nymphs are long and streamlined, 40–46 mm (1.6–1.8 in) in length, with banded legs, stripes on the head and thorax, a wide facial mask and a spine on each side of the sixth abdominal segment.

== Distribution and habitat ==
The brown hawker is found from southern Great Britain and Ireland east through Europe, including much of Fennoscandia into Asia. It is most abundant in central, eastern and northern Europe and extends as far east as the Sakha Republic in Siberia, but it is absent from the Scotland, northern Scandinavia and much of southern Europe. In the north, brown hawkers prefer slow-flowing or standing waters including natural waters such as large pools, lakes, fens and oxbows, as well as man-made waterbodies such as canals, ponds, ditches, reservoirs and peat diggings. It is closely tied to forest or woodland. In the south it is less catholic in its choice of habitats and prefers mature habitats and avoid early successional habitats.

== Behaviour ==
The brown hawker lays its eggs in floating or emergent vegetation or timber in standing or slow moving water. It does not typically hunt near water and can be observed hawking in woodland rides late into summer evenings. In Great Britain the main flight period of the brown hawker is between May and September.
