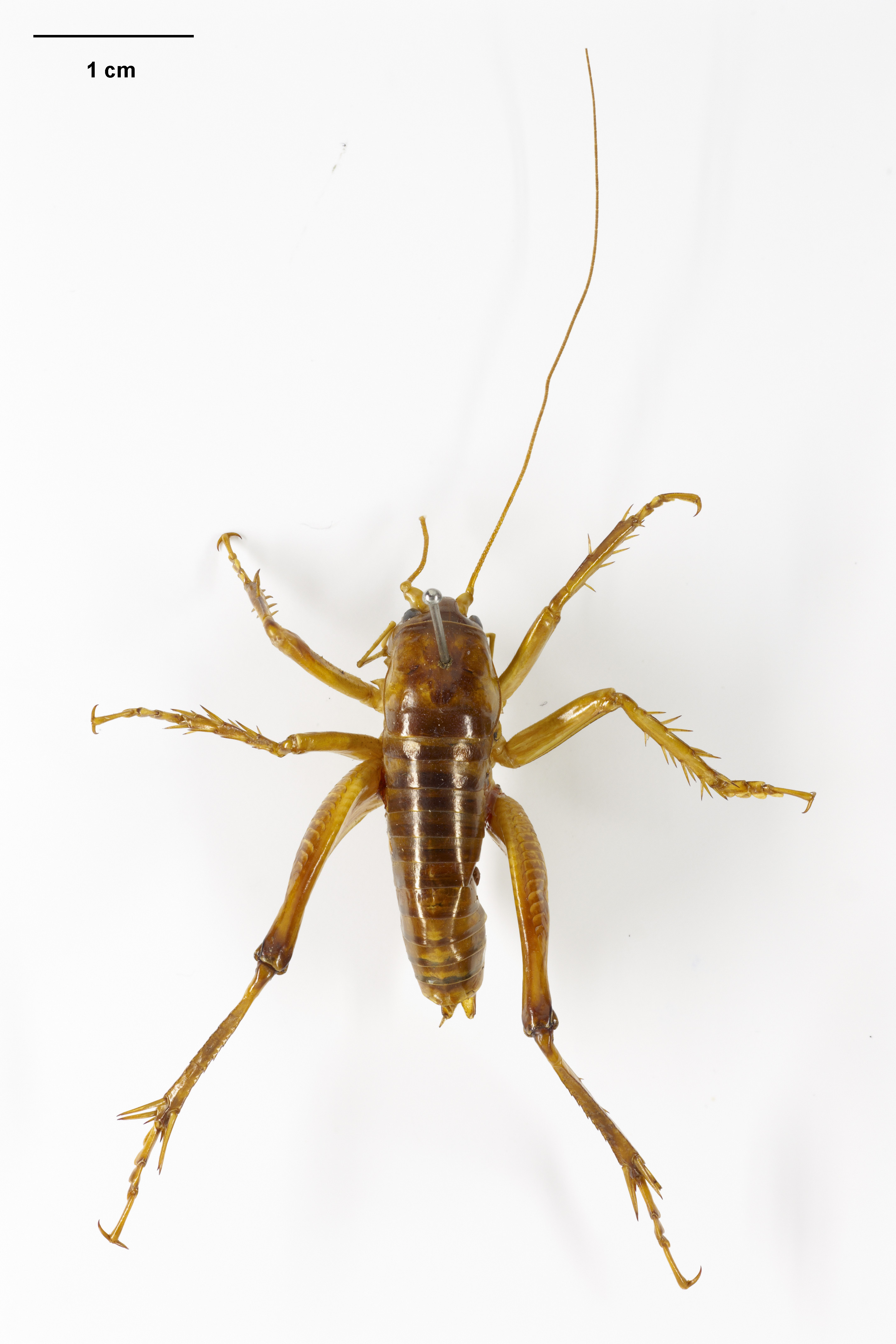

Conservation status
- Naturally Uncommon (NZ TCS)

Scientific classification
- Domain: Eukaryota
- Kingdom: Animalia
- Phylum: Arthropoda
- Class: Insecta
- Order: Orthoptera
- Suborder: Ensifera
- Family: Anostostomatidae
- Genus: Anderus
- Species: A. subantarcticus

Binomial name
- Anderus subantarcticus (Salmon, 1950)

Synonyms
- Zealandosandrus subantarcticus Salmon, 1950; Hemiandrus subantarcticus (Salmon, 1950)

= Anderus subantarcticus =

Species of Orthoptera

Anderus subantarcticus is a species of ground weta endemic to New Zealand.

== Taxonomy ==
This species was first described as Zealandosandrus subantarcticus in 1950 by John Salmon. The first specimens are recorded as being collected during the 1907 New Zealand Government Expedition. Zealandrosandrus was recognized as a synonym of Hemiandrus in 1997 so this species was moved to Hemiandrus. In 2024 a new genus was created (Anderus), named for a Swedish entomologist (Ander), because the New Zealand species of Hemiandrus were not a monophyletic group. DNA sequencing data showed the species of Anderus are sister to genera in Australia.

== Description ==
Anderus subantarcticus is roughly 30mm in length.

== Habitat and distribution ==
This species is endemic to Snares Island. They are known to occur in the burrows of petrels.

== Conservation status ==
Under the New Zealand Threat Classification System, this species is listed as Naturally Uncommon with the qualifiers of "Range Restricted", "Island Endemic" and "Conservation Dependent".
