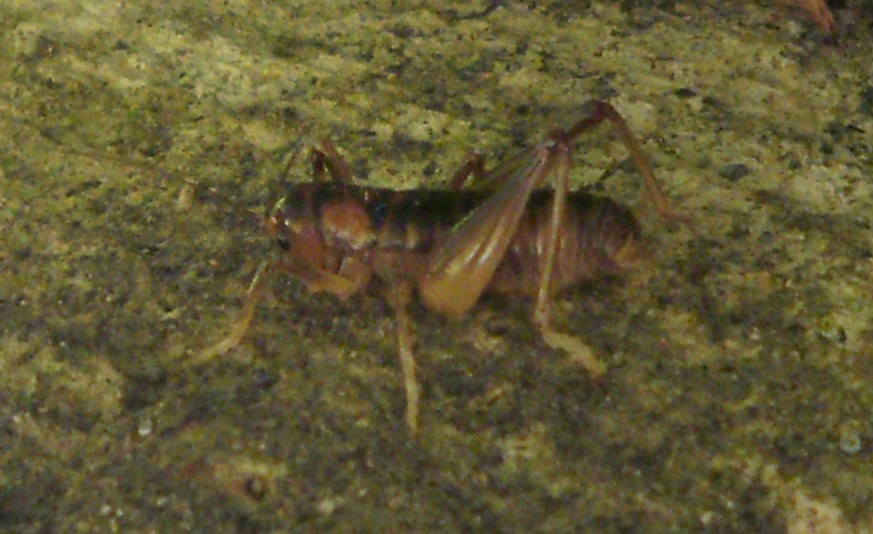

Conservation status
- Not Threatened (NZ TCS)

Scientific classification
- Kingdom: Animalia
- Phylum: Arthropoda
- Clade: Pancrustacea
- Class: Insecta
- Order: Orthoptera
- Suborder: Ensifera
- Family: Anostostomatidae
- Genus: Hemiandrus
- Species: H. pallitarsis

Binomial name
- Hemiandrus pallitarsis (Walker, 1869)

Synonyms
- Libanasa pallitarsis Walker, 1869; Hemiandrus furcifer Ander, 1938

= Hemiandrus pallitarsis =

Species of orthopteran insect

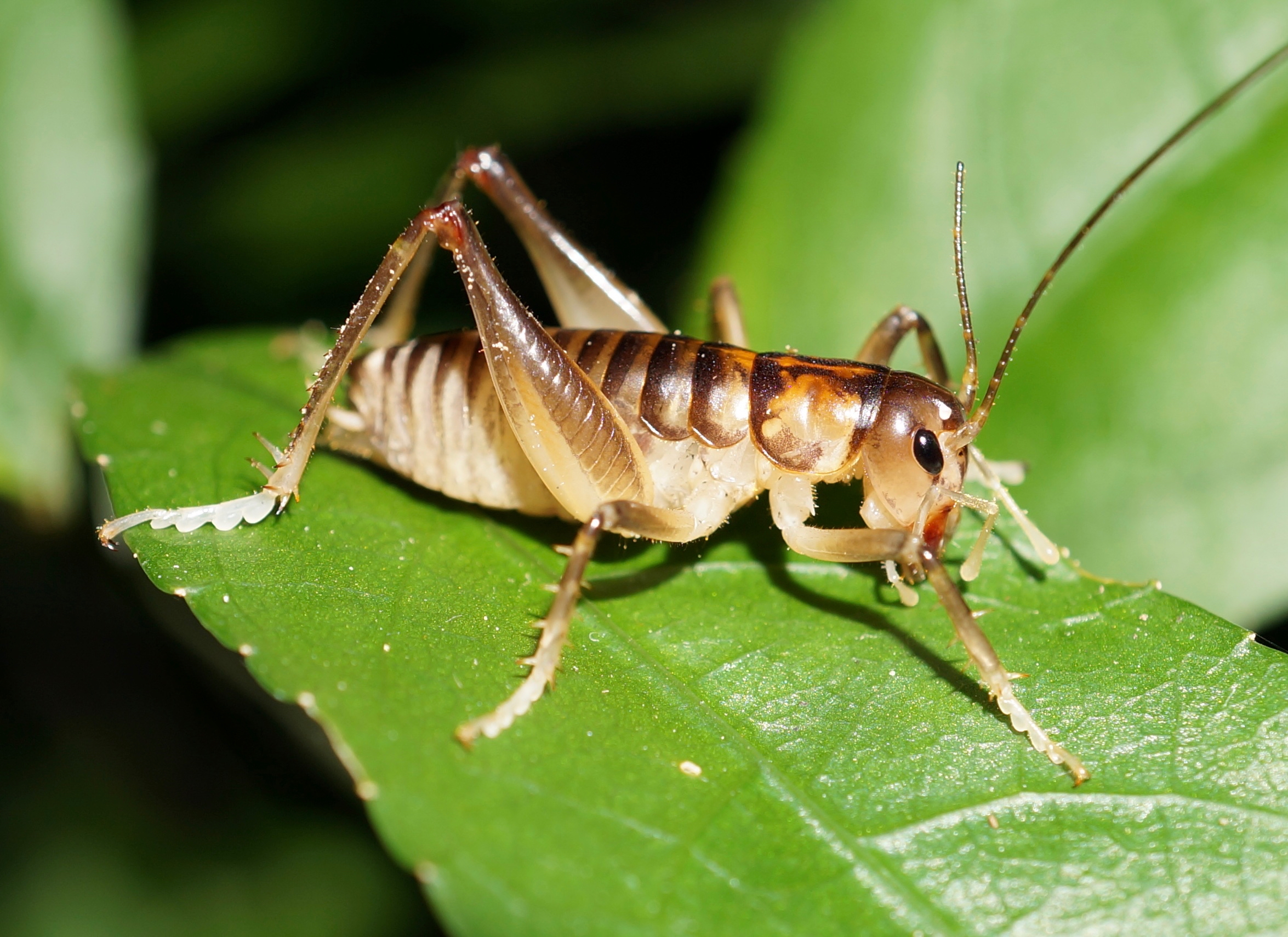
Male Hemiandrus pallitarsis

Hemiandrus pallitarsis is a species of ground weta endemic to New Zealand. This nocturnal species hides in burrows during the day, and can be an important food for kiwi. They can be identified by a single foretibial spine, three prolateral spines, and four retrolateral spines on the mesotibia, and their tibia lacks a tympanal membrane (they hear only through vibrations in the ground). The female has an unusual appendage on her abdomen, and the male has blackened hooks on his last tergite. They have a two-year life cycle, and their diet is largely unknown. Unusually for an insect, the female shows maternal care towards her eggs and nymphs.

== Taxonomy ==
Hemiandrus pallitarsis was first described by Francis Walker in 1871 in the genus Libanasa, and in 1906 W. F. Kirby moved it to the genus Ceuthophilus. In 1938, Kjell Ander erected the genus Hemiandrus, and moved this species to it, under the species name furcifer. This species is therefore synonymous with both Libanasa pallitarsis Walker and Hemiandrus furcifer Ander.

== Habitat/Distribution ==
Hemiandrus pallitarsis is endemic to the North Island of New Zealand. They are widespread throughout this distribution and are relatively abundant. They are often found in burrows in the ground during the day, as they are nocturnal . During the night they are quite active on the ground, but are also found in vegetation such as beech trees, kanuka bushes and on leaves of plants such as kawakawa. H. pallitarsis is often found at elevations below 200 metres.

== Conservation ==
Under the New Zealand Threat Classification System, this species is listed as "Not Threatened". These weta are widespread and relatively abundant, therefore a species of least concern. Because they are nocturnal they are an important and accessible food source for kiwi, in areas where kiwi are present.

== Diet ==
The diet of this species is unknown; other Hemiandrus species vary from carnivorous, to omnivorous (fruit, invertebrates, and seeds), to herbivorous (apricots and grasses), During the summer in the Ōrongorongo forest (southern North Island) this species of ground wētā is commonly caught climbing tree trunks, with large numbers climbing into hard beech trees (Fuscospora truncata) . At the same time of year moth caterpillars feeding on hard beech are abundant which might explain this behaviour.

== Morphology ==
Hemiandrus pallitarsis is morphologically identified by having a single foretibial spine, three prolateral spines, and four retrolateral spines on the mesotibia. Males can be identified by blackened hooks on the last tergite. Adult females have an elbow-like, forked appendage on their abdomen, formed from one of the sternites; this is the only Hemiandrus to have such an enlarged appendage. Females are also distinguished by their short ovipositor, so short it can be overlooked and females mistaken for males, The genus Hemiandrus contains species of widely varying overpositor lengths, which can distinguish between species. H. pallitarsus has no tympanum, and instead can detect sound through its cuticle, which is adaptive for their underground lifestyle. The tibia lack the tympanal membranes or vestiges of other Orthoptera legs.

== Breeding ==
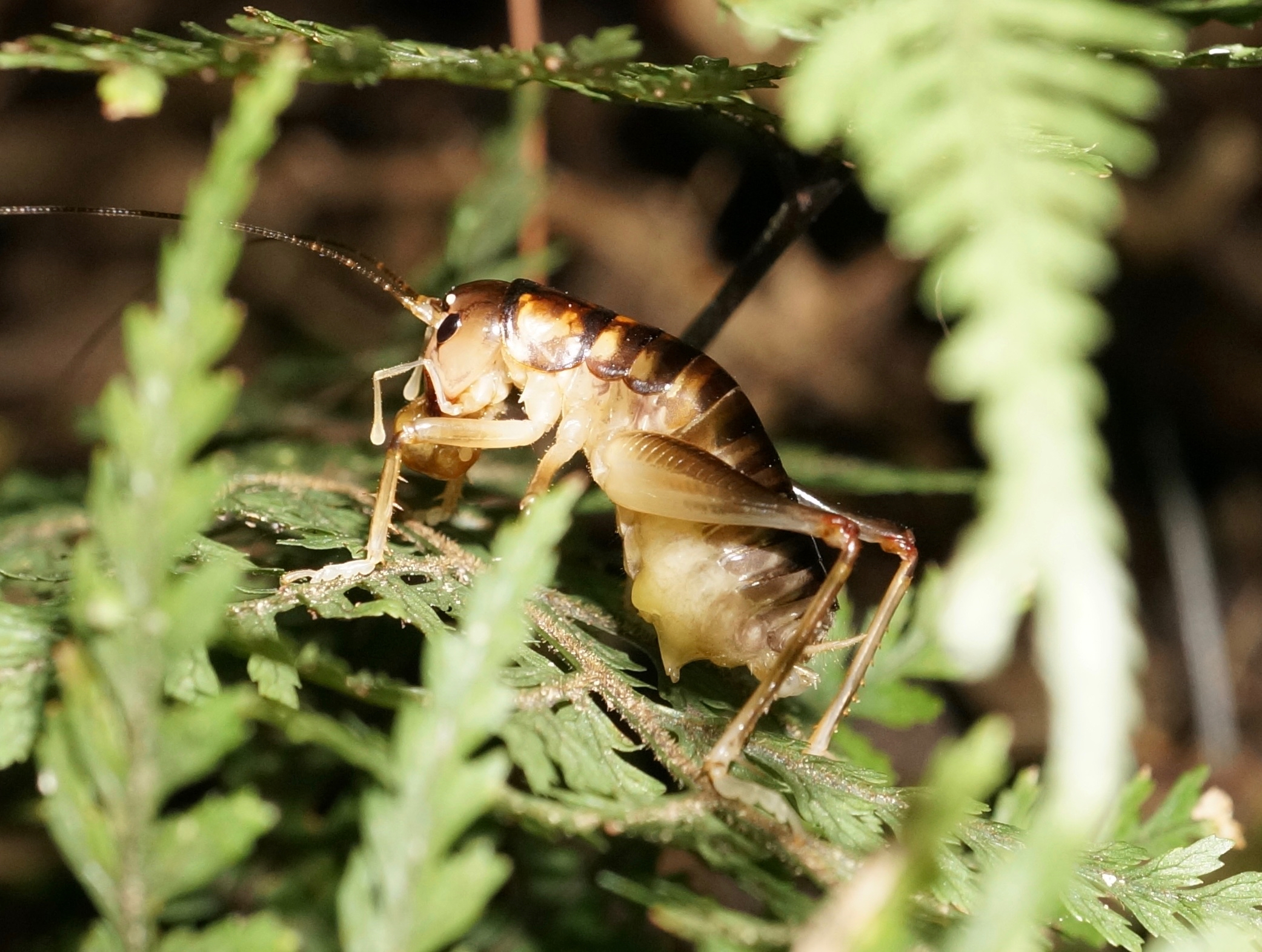
Hemiandrus pallitarsis female

Hemiandrus pallitarsis come out of their burrows at night and adults will often sit on top of leaves (such as kawakawa) and use pheromones and drumming to attract mates; it is on top of these leaves that most matings take place. This drumming sound is produced by the drumming of the abdomen on a substrate, such as a plant leaf. The special appendage on the female's abdomen is thought to function in acquiring nuptial gifts from the male: these gifts contain nutrients, allowing the female to lay more eggs. There is a positive correlation between appendage size and nuptial gift size, and therefore between appendage size and the number of eggs laid by a female. This suggest that this structure is sexually selected upon by males, as the larger the appendage, the larger the female's fitness.

Females will burrow to create brood chambers under the ground (2.5 centimeters deep at most) to lay their eggs in, staying with the eggs until they hatch (most of the time, until they die). They lay about 50 eggs at a time; the short ovipositor of this species aids in the laying of eggs within the underground brood chamber, rather than into the soil as in other Hemiandrus species. H. pallitarsis shows maternal care, which is rare in Orthopterans. There is continual care of the clutch (by covering the eggs with soil and even moving them should the burrow flood), but there is also physical, aggressive defense of the clutch. Other species within this genus exhibit maternal care too, but only the species which have short ovipositors. Eggs are laid in July, and hatching occurs in September and October (these are winter and spring months in New Zealand). Immature individuals are found most often between the months of December and March and adults are found throughout the year. Juveniles most likely take up to a year to develop into an adult. They then live for approximately two years.
