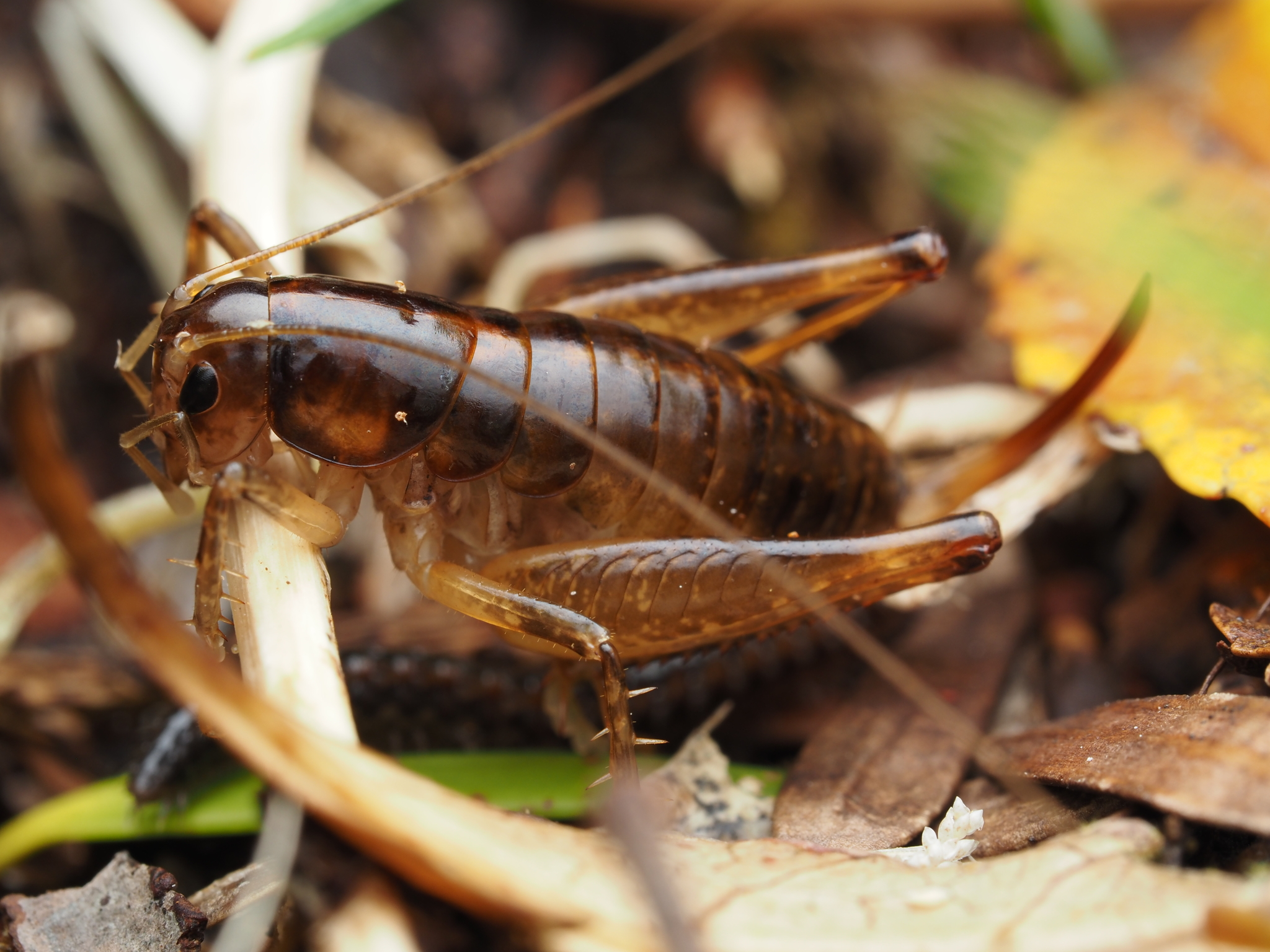

Conservation status
- Not Threatened (NZ TCS)

Scientific classification
- Domain: Eukaryota
- Kingdom: Animalia
- Phylum: Arthropoda
- Class: Insecta
- Order: Orthoptera
- Suborder: Ensifera
- Family: Anostostomatidae
- Genus: Anderus
- Species: A. brucei

Binomial name
- Anderus brucei (Taylor-Smith, Trewick, Morgan-Richards 2016)

Synonyms
- Hemiandrus brucei Taylor Smith, Trewick & Morgan-Richards, 2016

= Anderus brucei =

Species of wētā

Anderus brucei is a species of ground wētā in the family Anostostomatidae endemic to New Zealand. These insects are nocturnal and found in forests in the North Island and northern South Island.

== Taxonomy ==
Previously encompassed under Hemiandrus maculifrons, A. brucei is similar in appearance but genetically distinct. This species was moved to the genus Anderus in 2024 when genetic data showed the species within Hemiandrus were not monophyletic. Anderus brucei is named in memory of Briar Taylor-Smith's grandfather, Bruce Edwin Smith.

== Habitat and distribution ==
Anderus brucei is found in native forests in the North Island and northern South Island of New Zealand and is often sympatric with other wētā species. Having such a broad range is uncharacteristic of most ground wētā, which are often endemic to very small areas.

== Morphology ==
Anderus brucei has a high level of morphological variation. The head and body of A. brucei is mostly brown but sometimes with small pale patches on the lateral and dorsal surfaces of the pronotum. Anderus brucei has fine microsetae on the three apical segments of the maxillary palps; four spines on the inferior retro lateral angle of the mid tibiae; a single inferior articulated spine on the hind tibiae; males with a V- or U-shaped apical margin on the subgenital plate, blunt cerci, and ninth abdominal termite with two obtuse curved lobes; females with a long, gently curved ovipositor.

== Conservation ==
Andrus brucei is classified as Not Threatened in the New Zealand Threat Classification System.

== Type information ==
- Taylor-Smith, BL; Trewick, SA; & Morgan-Richards, M (2016). Three new ground wētā species and a redescription of Hemiandrus maculifrons. New Zealand Journal of Zoology.
- Type specimen: adult female; March 2012; BL Taylor-Smith; deposited at the Museum of New Zealand Te Papa Tongarewa
- Paratype: adult male, same collection data as holotype; deposited at the Museum of New Zealand Te Papa Tongarewa
- Type location: Collected from the Kahuterawa Valley, Wellington −40.47190°, 175.61417°
