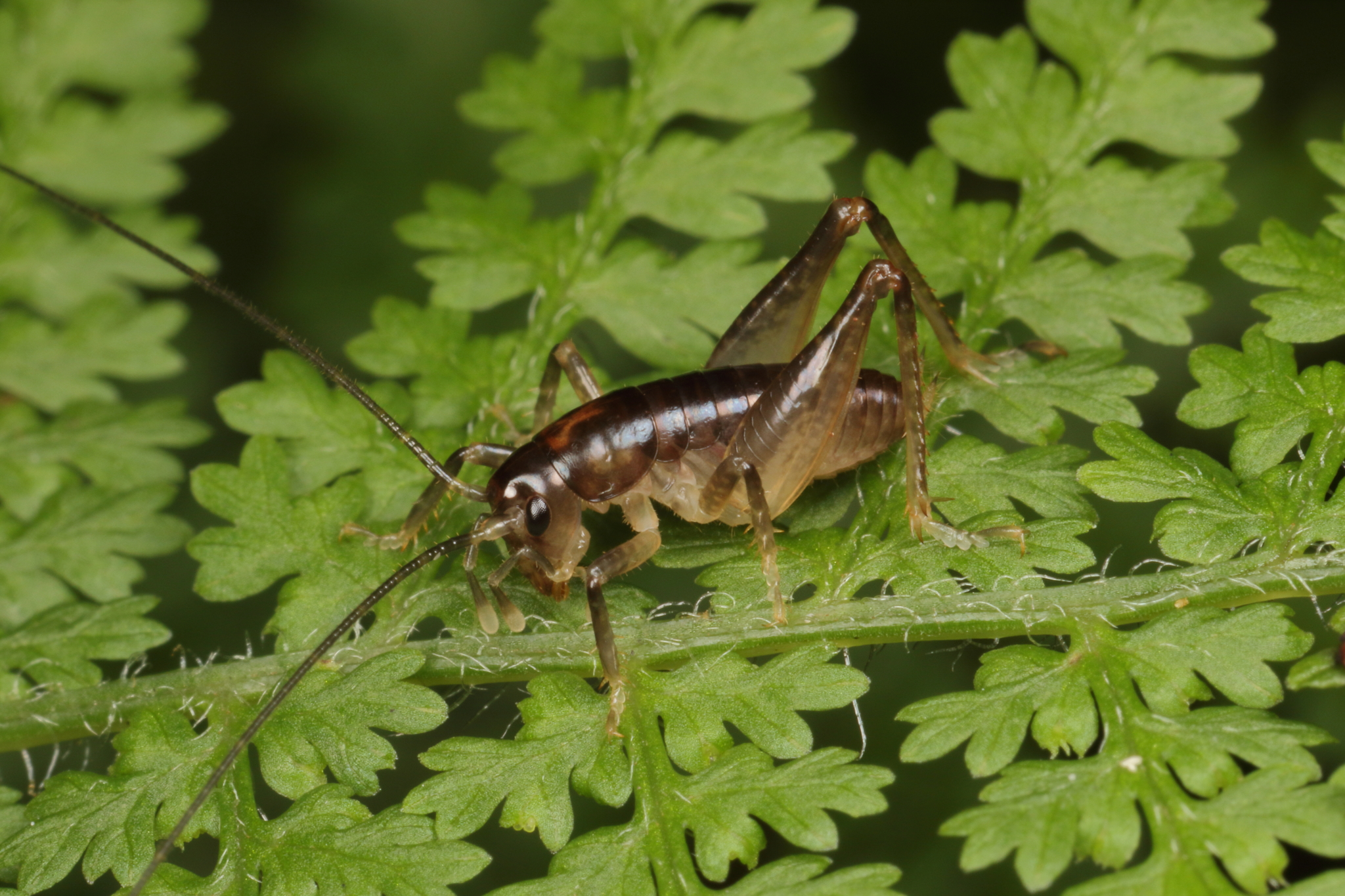
- Anderus maculifrons

Scientific classification
- Kingdom: Animalia
- Phylum: Arthropoda
- Clade: Pancrustacea
- Class: Insecta
- Order: Orthoptera
- Suborder: Ensifera
- Family: Anostostomatidae
- Genus: Anderus; Trewick, Taylor-Smith & Morgan-Richards, 2024

Type species
- Hemiandrus brucei Taylor-Smith et al., 2016

Species
- See text

Synonyms
- Zealandosandrus Salmon, 1950 Hemiandrus Ander, 1938

= Anderus =

Genus of orthopteran insects

Anderus is a genus of forest insects in the family Anostostomatidae (wētā). All Anderus species are nocturnal, and hide in burrows during the day. In New Zealand they are known as ground wētā due to their burrowing lifestyle. Ground wētā adults are smaller than other types of wētā, and females of all Anderus species have long ovipositors.

== Taxonomy ==
The genus Anderus was named for the Swedish entomologist Kjell Ander in 2024. Six species previously in the genus Hemiandrus were shown to be sister the Australian winged species Transaevum laudatum, based on analysis of DNA sequences. In the genus Anderus there are eight described species.

== Morphology ==
Pilosity of palps distinguishes this genus

The genus Anderus includes the smallest wētā species, with adult individual body size no more than 7 millimetres, and weighing less than a gram. These wētā have no tympanum, and instead are able to detect sound through their cuticle, which is adaptive for their underground lifestyle. Species in the genus Anderus can be distinguished from other New Zealand ground wētā (Hemiandrus) using the covering of short fine setae over the whole of the surface of segment 4 of their maxillary palps.

== Ecology ==
Ground wētā seal the entrance of their burrow during the day with a soil plug or door so that their burrow is concealed. The diet of three species is dominated by invertebrate material; A. maculifrons, A. nox and A. subantarcticus are all carnivorous

Several ground wētā species have been recorded drumming, despite lacking the tympanum 'ears' present in other wētā genera. The sounds produced are inaudible to humans and is detected through the cuticle.

The species of Anderus are eaten by native bird species such as robins, saddlebacks kiwi, but also by introduced species such as mice, stoats, cats, and hedgehogs. Most species are common and widespread in native forests, and are not thought to be endangered (as per the New Zealand Department of Conservation).

== Distribution ==
Species of this genus are found throughout the North and South Island, and even on some of the offshore islands of New Zealand. They are found in lowland forests.

== Species ==
- Anderus brucei (Taylor-Smith, Trewick & Morgan-Richards, 2016)
- Anderus fiordensis (Salmon, 1950)
- Anderus luna (Taylor-Smith, Trewick & Morgan-Richards, 2016)
- Anderus maculifrons (Walker, 1869)
- Anderus nox (Taylor-Smith, Trewick & Morgan-Richards, 2016)
- Anderus pipiwai Trewick & Morgan-Richards, 2025
- Anderus rakiura Trewick & Morgan-Richards, 2025
- Anderus subantarcticus (Salmon, 1950)
