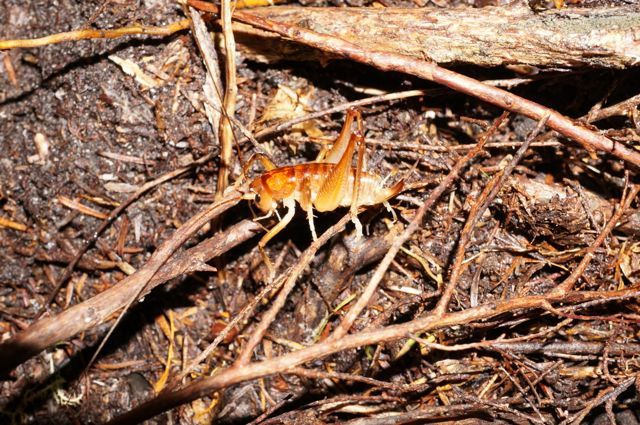

Conservation status
- Not Threatened (NZ TCS)

Scientific classification
- Domain: Eukaryota
- Kingdom: Animalia
- Phylum: Arthropoda
- Class: Insecta
- Order: Orthoptera
- Suborder: Ensifera
- Family: Anostostomatidae
- Genus: Hemiandrus
- Species: H. electra

Binomial name
- Hemiandrus electra Taylor Smith, Morgan-Richards, Trewick 2013

= Hemiandrus electra =

Species of orthopteran insect

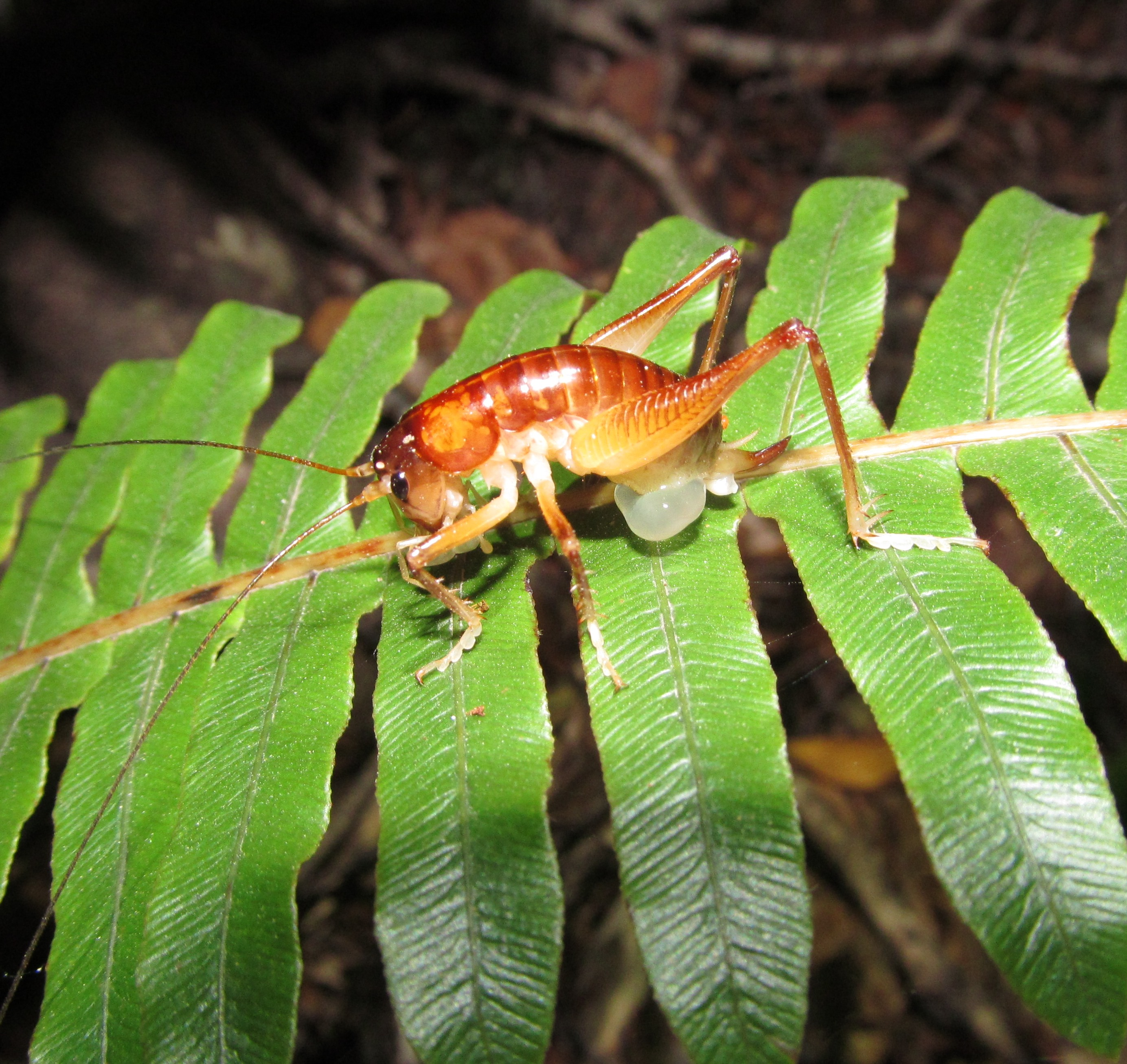
Adult female Hemiandrus electra after mating with nuptial gift attached to her tummy

Hemiandrus electra, the Kahurangi ground wētā, is a species of ground wētā endemic to New Zealand. Being a ground wētā, they are often found in burrows in the ground during the daytime (as they are also nocturnal). The species is occurs on the South Island and is classified as "Not Threatened". This species of wētā is unusual for an insect in that the female looks after her eggs and nymphs; this is known as maternal care.

== Taxonomy ==
Hemiandrus electra was first described in 2013, but had been referred to in previous publications by an informal (tag) name (Hemiandrus 'okiwi'). The species name comes from the Greek name Elektra, one of the Pleiades sisters (in Greek mythology the seven daughters of Pleione and Atlas), meaning amber or shinning. This name is given to this species due to the bight orange colour of the insects, and as sister to H. maia, a reference to their morphological similarity.

== Habitat/distribution ==
Hemiandrus electra are endemic to the South Island of New Zealand. Because they are a ground wētā, they are often found in burrows in the ground during the day, as they are a nocturnal species. During the night however, they are quite active on the ground, but are also found in vegetation.

== Conservation ==
Under the New Zealand Threat Classification System, this species is listed as "Not Threatened".

== Diet ==
Hemiandrus electra is omnivorous, about 80% of its diet is plant and 20% invertebrates. It has been observed eating invertebrates such as cicada

== Morphology ==
Kahurangi ground wētā females have a medium-length ovipositor. Male and females have fore tibiae with a single superior prolateral spine (excluding apical spine); mid tibiae with two superior prolateral spines and three superior retrolateral spines (excluding apical spines). Morphological they are very similar to the Otago ground wētā H. maia, but can be distinguished by number of tergal stridulatory pegs and male terminalia.

== Behavior ==
Hemiandrus electra come out of their burrows at night. During mating males provide the female with a nuptial food gift. The females share burrows with their eggs and care for nymphs.
