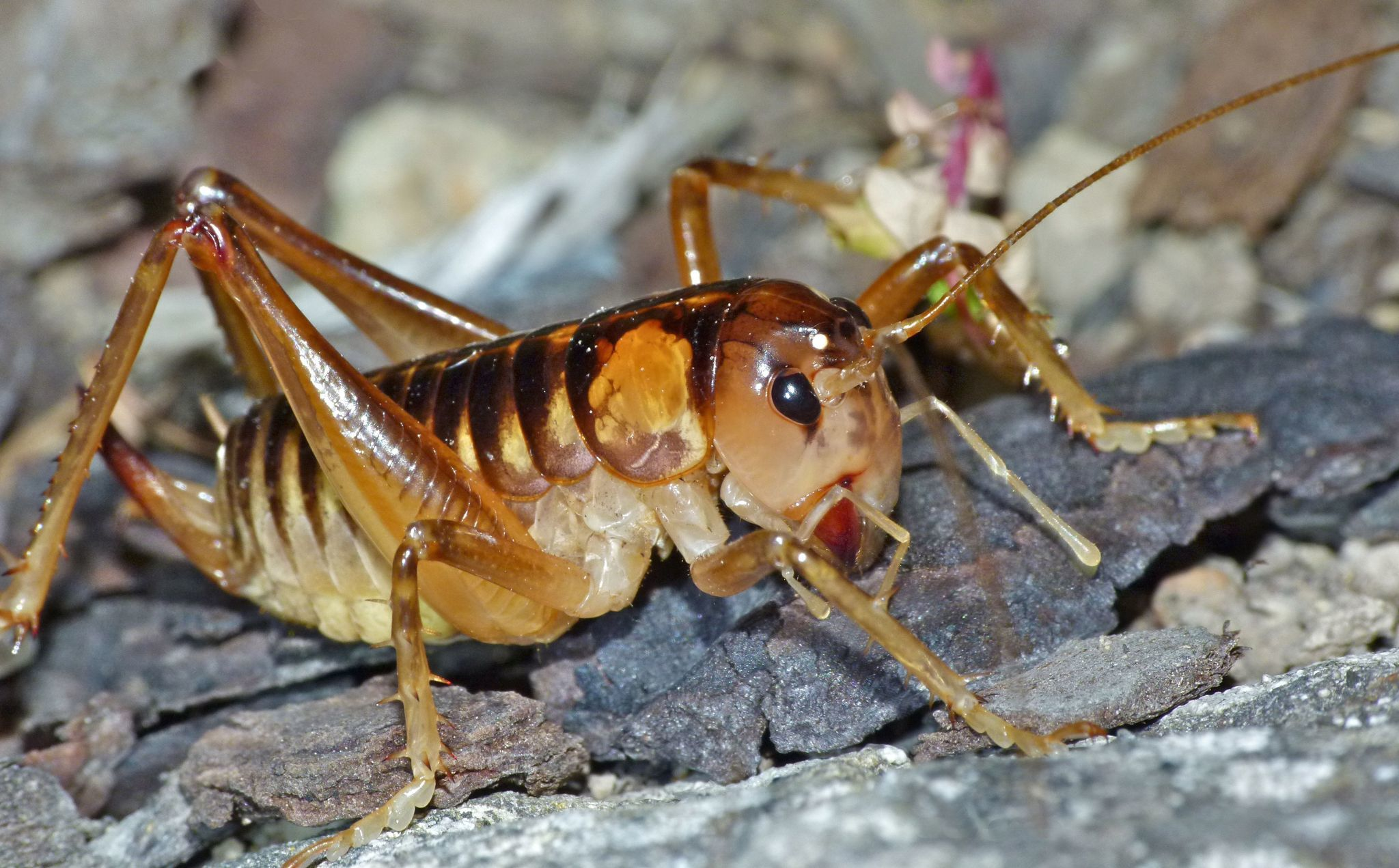

Conservation status
- Not Threatened (NZ TCS)

Scientific classification
- Kingdom: Animalia
- Phylum: Arthropoda
- Clade: Pancrustacea
- Class: Insecta
- Order: Orthoptera
- Suborder: Ensifera
- Family: Anostostomatidae
- Genus: Hemiandrus
- Species: H. maia

Binomial name
- Hemiandrus maia Taylor Smith, Morgan-Richards, Trewick 2013

= Hemiandrus maia =

Species of orthopteran insect

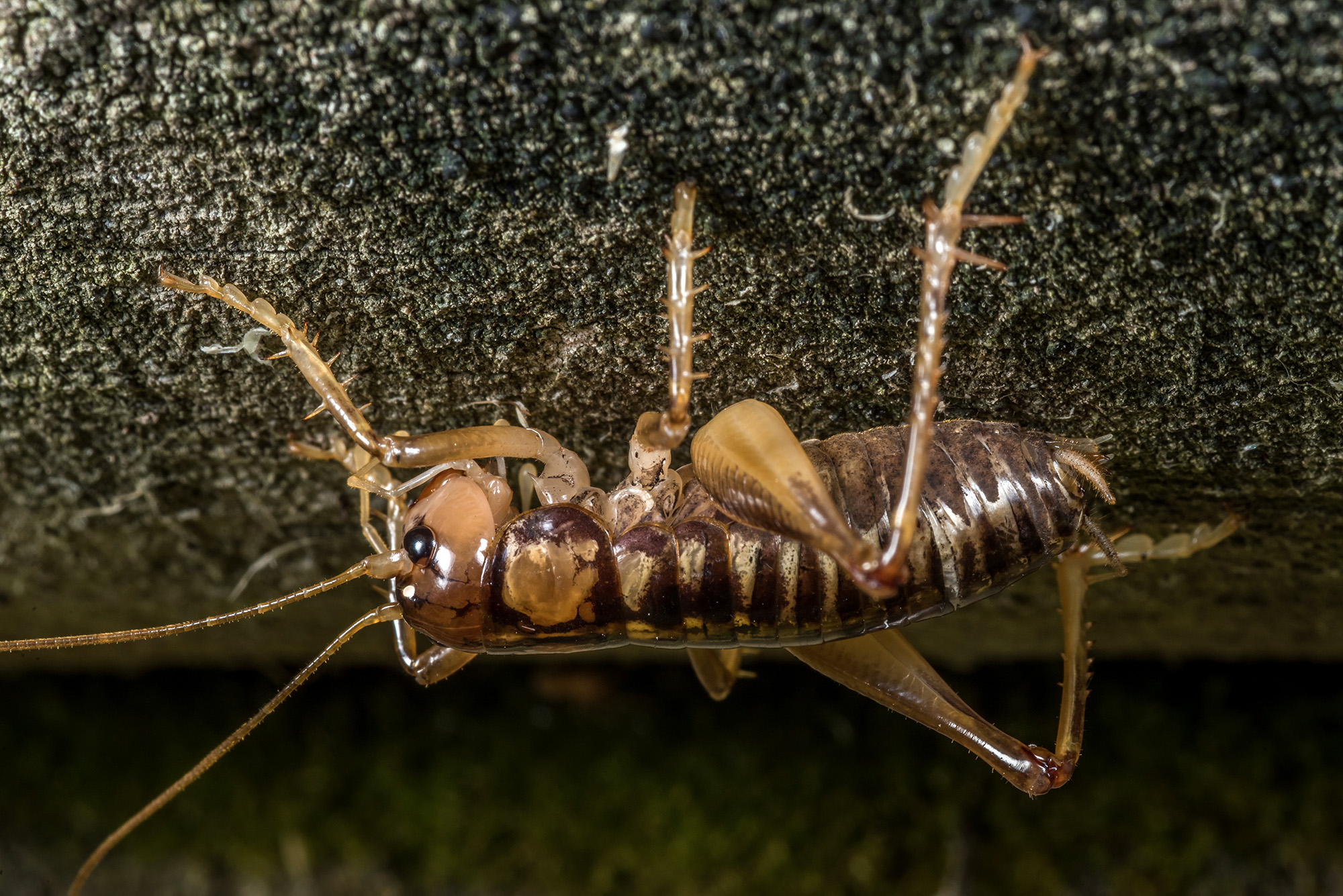
Hemiandrus maia at night in Dunedin

Hemiandrus maia, the Otago ground wētā, is a species of ground wētā endemic to New Zealand. Being a ground weta, they are often found in burrows in the ground during the daytime (as they are also nocturnal). The species is found on the South Island and is classified as "not threatened". This species of wētā is unusual for an insect in that the female looks after her eggs and nymph.

== Taxonomy ==
Hemiandrus maia was first described in 2013, but had been referred to in previous publications by an informal (tag) name (Hemiandrus 'evansae'). The species name comes from the Greek name Maia, the eldest of the Pleiades (in Greek mythology the seven daughters of Pleione and Atlas), meaning 'mother' or 'good mother'. This name is given to this species to reflect the maternal care exhibited. Hemiandrus maia is sister to H. mataitai, the ground wētā from Sutton Salt Lake in Otago.

== Habitat and distribution ==
Hemiandrus maia are endemic to the South Island of New Zealand. Because they are a ground weta, they are often found in burrows in the ground during the day, as they are a nocturnal species. During the night, they are quite active on the ground, but are also found in vegetation.

== Conservation ==
Under the New Zealand Threat Classification System, this species is listed as "Not Threatened".

== Diet ==
Hemiandrus maia is omnivorous, eating fruit and invertebrates but avoiding seeds of native plants.

== Morphology ==
Otago ground wētā females have a medium-length ovipositor. Male and females have fore tibiae with a single superior prolateral spine (excluding apical spine) and mid tibiae with two superior prolateral spines and three superior retrolateral spines (excluding apical spines).

== Behavior ==
Hemiandrus maia come out of their burrows on average once every three nights. The females share burrows and care for eggs and nymphs.
