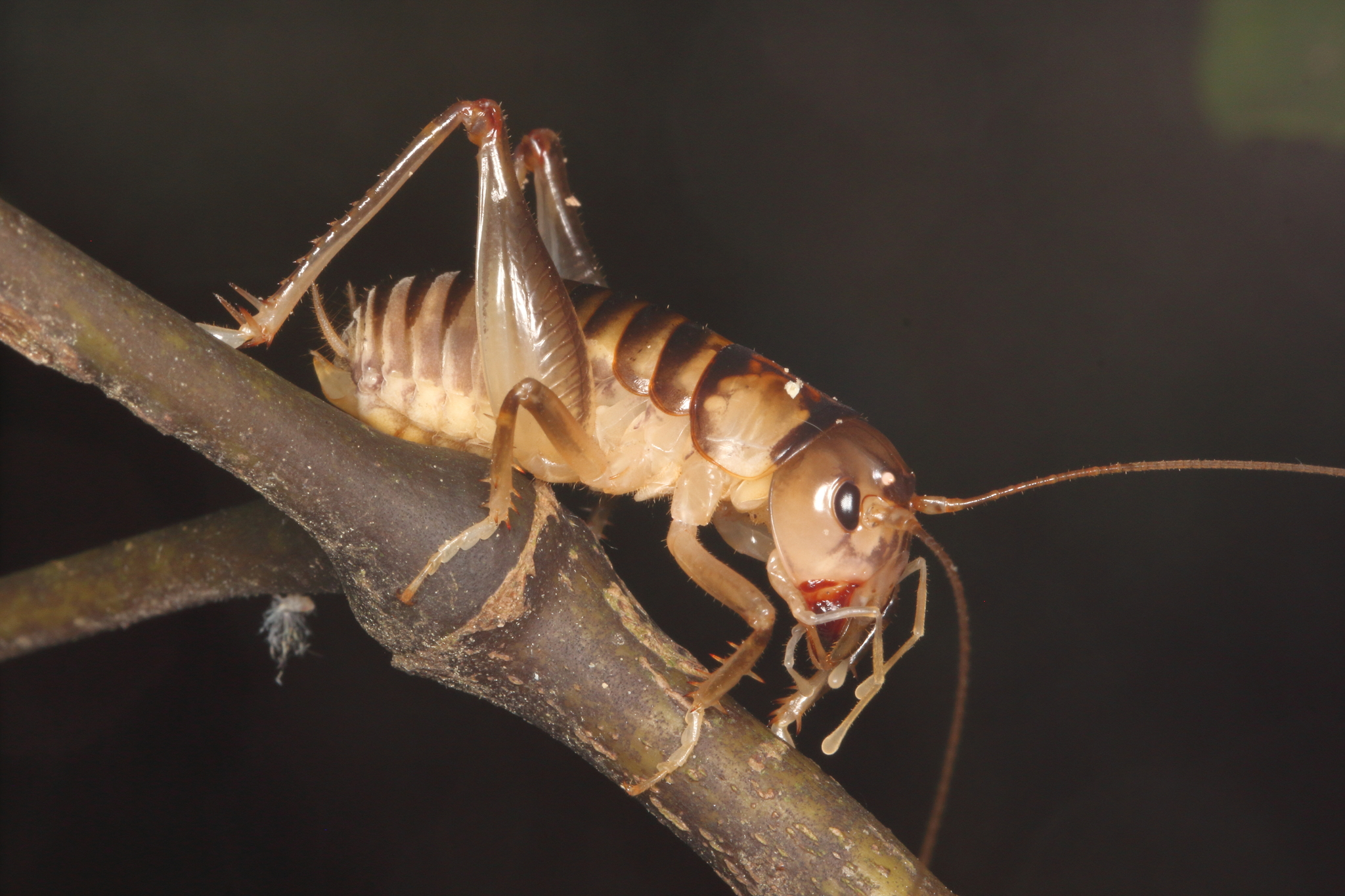

Conservation status
- Not Threatened (NZ TCS)

Scientific classification
- Kingdom: Animalia
- Phylum: Arthropoda
- Class: Insecta
- Order: Orthoptera
- Suborder: Ensifera
- Family: Anostostomatidae
- Genus: Hemiandrus
- Species: H. sterope

Binomial name
- Hemiandrus sterope Trewick, Taylor-Smith & Morgan-Richards 2020

= Hemiandrus sterope =

Species of insect

Hemiandrus sterope, the lightning wētā, is a species of Hemiandrus. It is a medium-sized ground wētā, and was discovered in the Marlborough Sounds alongside three other wētā species, published in 2020. The name 'lightning' comes from one of the Pleiades sisters.

== Behaviour ==
The male lightning wētā beats its abdomen against a leaf or other structures. It is believed that it is used as a form of communication by creating vibrations that other wētā can listen to.

== Conservation status ==
Under the New Zealand Threat Classification System, this species is listed as "Not Threatened".
