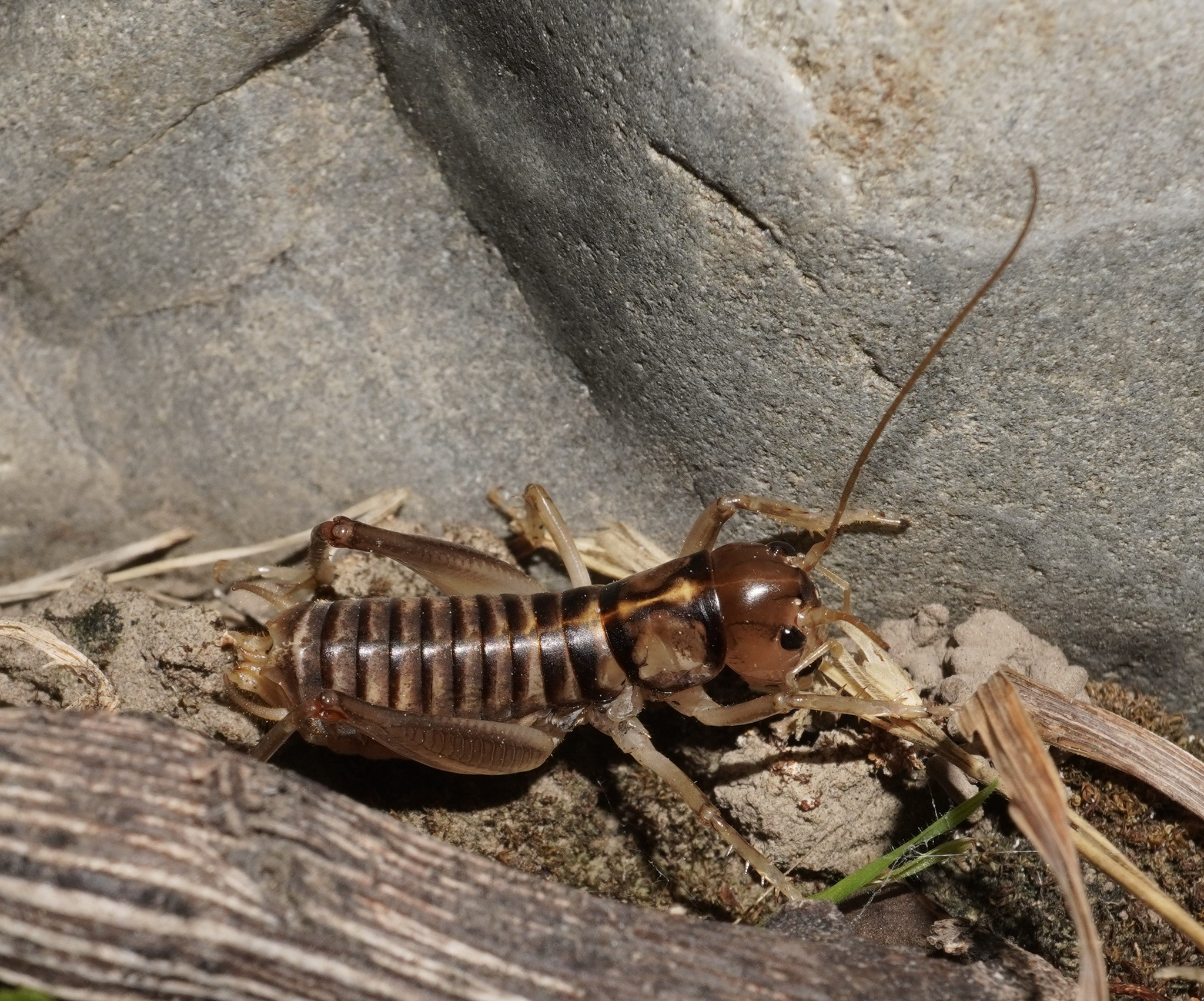

Conservation status
- Not Threatened (NZ TCS)

Scientific classification
- Kingdom: Animalia
- Phylum: Arthropoda
- Class: Insecta
- Order: Orthoptera
- Suborder: Ensifera
- Family: Anostostomatidae
- Genus: Hemiandrus
- Species: H. bilobatus

Binomial name
- Hemiandrus bilobatus Ander 1938

SynonymsSalmon 1950
- Hemiandrus similis

= Hemiandrus bilobatus =

Species of wētā endemic to New Zealand

Hemiandrus bilobatus, the wine wētā (or Cook Strait ground weta), is a species of ground weta endemic to New Zealand. Being a ground weta, they are often found in burrows in the ground during the daytime (as they are nocturnal). The species is found in Wellington, on Mana Island and northern South Island and is classified as "Not Threatened". This species of weta is unusual for an insect in that the female shows maternal care. She lays about 50 eggs in the same burrow she uses during the day and looks after her eggs until they hatch.

== Taxonomy ==
Hemiandrus bilobatus was first described in 1938. The specific name refers to the two lobes on the ventral surface of the abdominal tergites of adult females. Hemiandrus bilobatus includes populations of ground weta found in the Awatere Valley in Marlborough previously referred at as Hemiandrus "promontorius" or "Cape Campbell".

== Habitat/distribution ==
Hemiandrus bilobatus are endemic to the Wellington and Marlborough regions of New Zealand. They are often found in burrows in the ground during the day, and are only active at night. During the night they are quite active on the ground, but are also found in on tree trunks and foliage.

== Conservation ==
Under the New Zealand Threat Classification System, this species is listed as "Not Threatened".

== Diet ==
Hemiandrus bilobatus are omnivorous. They have been observed eating invertebrates such as Deinacrida rugosa (giant weta), moths and beetle larvae and feeding on the young buds of grape vines. Control of ground weta in vineyards has been tried using a number of approaches, the most effective method being a layer of mussel shells under the vines.

== Morphology ==
Cook Strait ground weta females have a very short ovipositor.

== Behaviour ==
Hemiandrus biolobatus come out of their burrows at night. During mating males provide the female with a nuptial food gift. The females share burrows with their eggs and care for nymphs.
