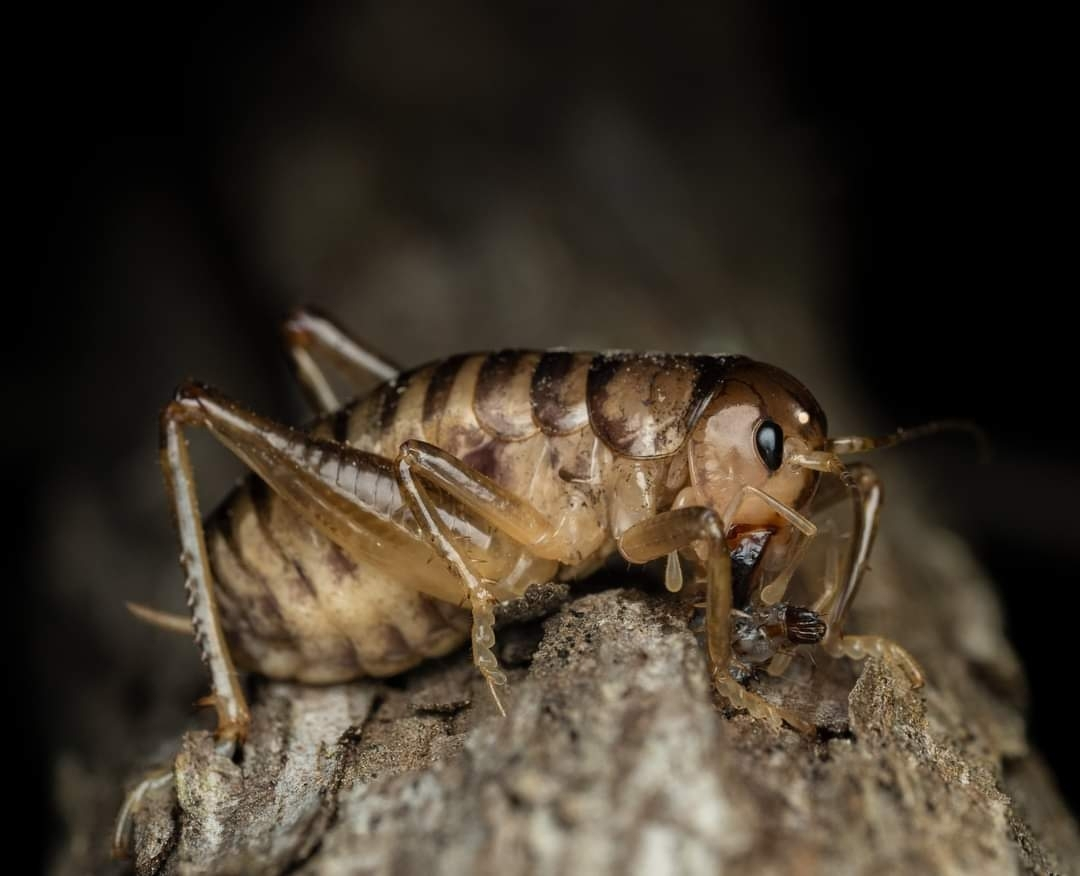

Conservation status
- Naturally Uncommon (NZ TCS)

Scientific classification
- Kingdom: Animalia
- Phylum: Arthropoda
- Clade: Pancrustacea
- Class: Insecta
- Order: Orthoptera
- Suborder: Ensifera
- Family: Anostostomatidae
- Genus: Hemiandrus
- Species: H. celaeno

Binomial name
- Hemiandrus celaeno Trewick SA, Taylor-Smith B, Morgan-Richards M 2021

Synonyms
- Hemiandrus horomaka

= Hemiandrus celaeno =

Species of wētā endemic to New Zealand

Hemiandrus celaeno is a species of endemic ground wētā in the family Anostostomatidae. H. celaeno is a small to medium-sized burrowing wētā found along the east coast of the South Island, New Zealand. Hemiandrus calaeno is a member of the short ovipositor ground wētā. H. celaeno is named for Celaeno of the Pleiades sisters in Greek mythology, whose name means "the dark one". Tag-named entity, H. ‘horomaka’, has been included under H. celaeno.

Hemiandrus celaeno is present on the east coast of the South Island, New Zealand from Kaikōura south to Banks Peninsula, and west to Porters Pass. Has been found in sheltered bush near remnant forest in Christchurch. Hemiandrus celaeno is classified as Naturally Uncommon by the New Zealand Threat Classification System. The qualifier is that it has a restricted range, only being found in the eastern South Island.

== Morphology ==
Hemiandrus celaeno is a small to medium-sized ground wētā.H. celaeno can be distinguished by the 3rd apical segment of the maxillary palps lacking hairs, with the 4th segment only partially covered; the dorsal midline of the pronotum lacking a yellow stripe; having one medial and one apical spine on the superior prolateras angle of the fore tibiae; two spines along the leg and one at the apex of the superior prolateras angle of the mid tibiae; the same configuration of spines along the superior retro lateral angle of the mid tibiae; males having very long cerci; females having a very short ovipositor and 6th abdominal segment with two lobes.

== Type information ==
- Trewick SA; Taylor-Smith B; Morgan-Richards M (2021). Ecology and systematics of the wine wētā and allied species, with description of four new Hemiandrus species. New Zealand Journal of Zoology
- Holotype: Adult female, 30 November 2012, M Morgan-Richards, deposited at the Museum of New Zealand Te Papa Tongarewa, AI.041952
- Paratype: Adult male, 30 November 2012, B Taylor-Smith, deposited at the Museum of New Zealand Te Papa Tongarewa, AI.041952
- Type locations: YMCA Wainui Park Camp, Wainui Valley Road, Banks Peninsula, Canterbury, New Zealand (Lat. −43.813101, Long. 172.893391)
