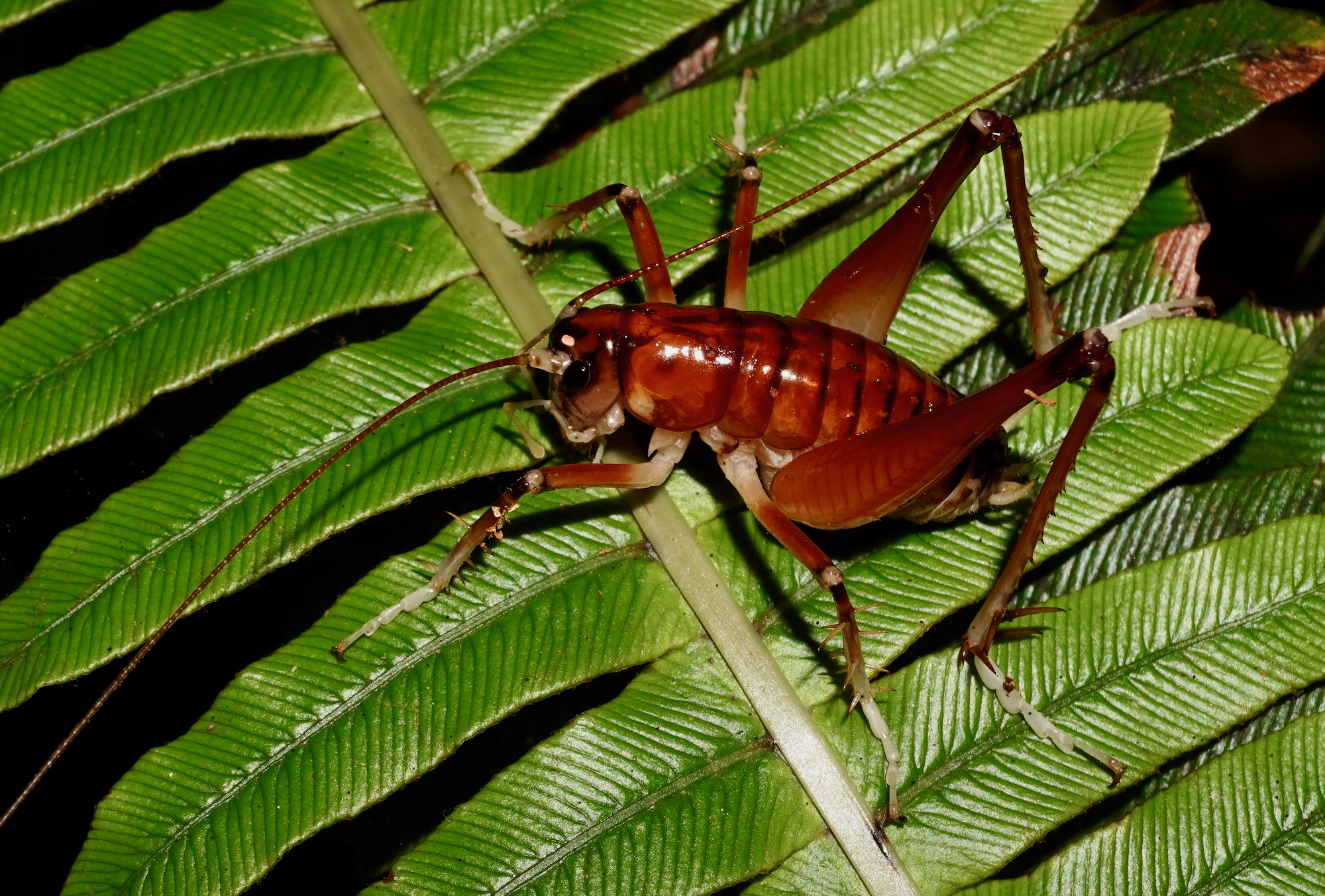
- Hemiandrus jacinda male

Conservation status
- Naturally Uncommon (NZ TCS)

Scientific classification
- Domain: Eukaryota
- Kingdom: Animalia
- Phylum: Arthropoda
- Class: Insecta
- Order: Orthoptera
- Suborder: Ensifera
- Family: Anostostomatidae
- Genus: Hemiandrus
- Species: H. jacinda

Binomial name
- Hemiandrus jacinda Trewick, 2021

= Hemiandrus jacinda =

Species of wētā endemic to New Zealand

Hemiandrus jacinda is a species of wētā endemic to New Zealand. It was first described by Steven A. Trewick in 2021. This species was named in honour of the prime minister of New Zealand, Jacinda Ardern.

A relatively large glossy, wētā with long legs and striking orange-red colouring in adults. Hemiandrus jacinda is nocturnal and it is expected that individuals roost during the day in burrows as with other Hemiandrus ground wētā. There are few records so the abundance of this species is uncertain, but the geographic range extends from Far North to Taranaki.

Under the New Zealand Threat Classification System, this species is listed as "Naturally Uncommon" with the qualifiers of "Biologically Sparse", "Data Poor: Size", "Data Poor: Trend" and "Population Fragmentation".

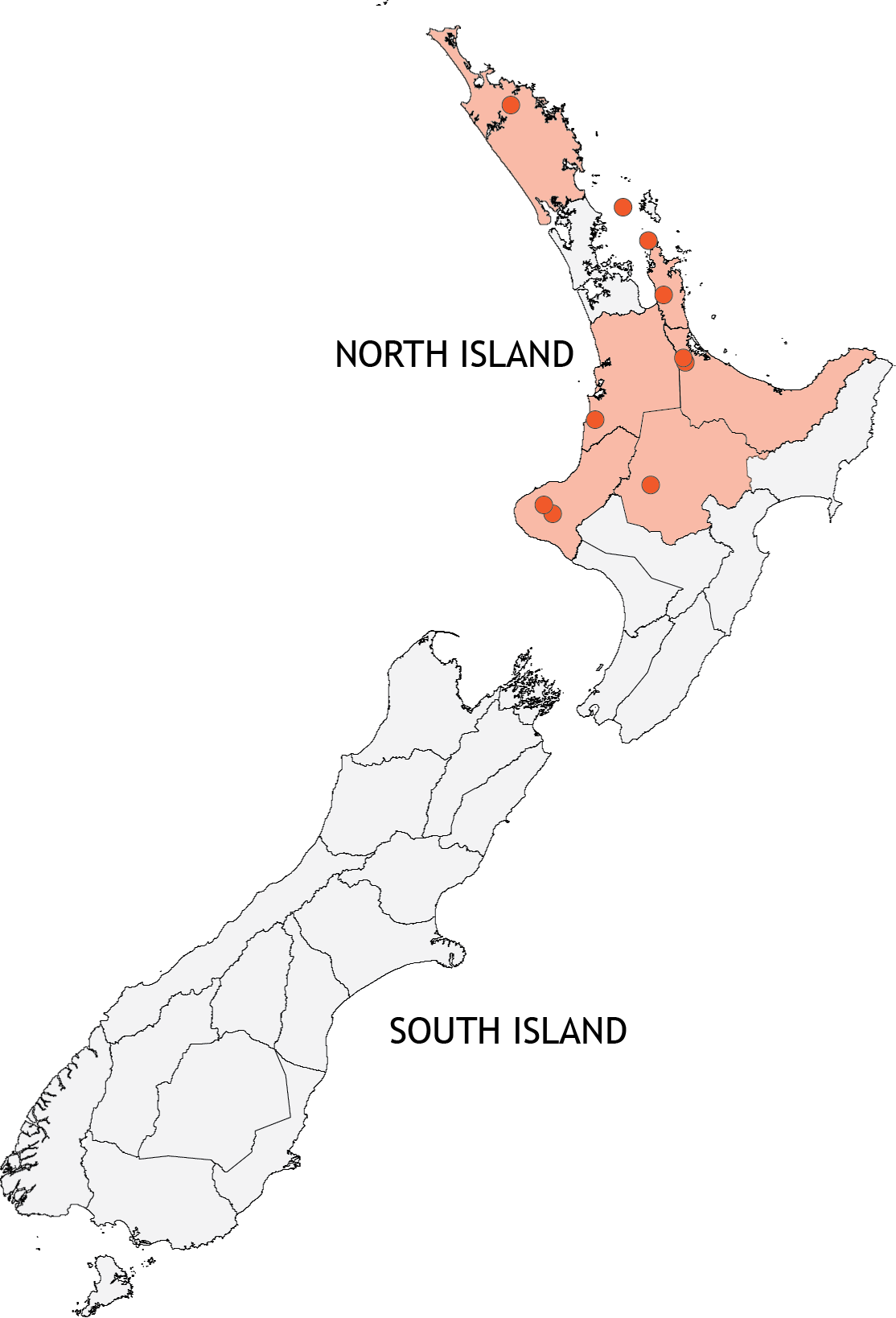
Locations (and Crosby regions) in Aotearoa New Zealand where the wētā Hemiandrus jacinda has been found.
