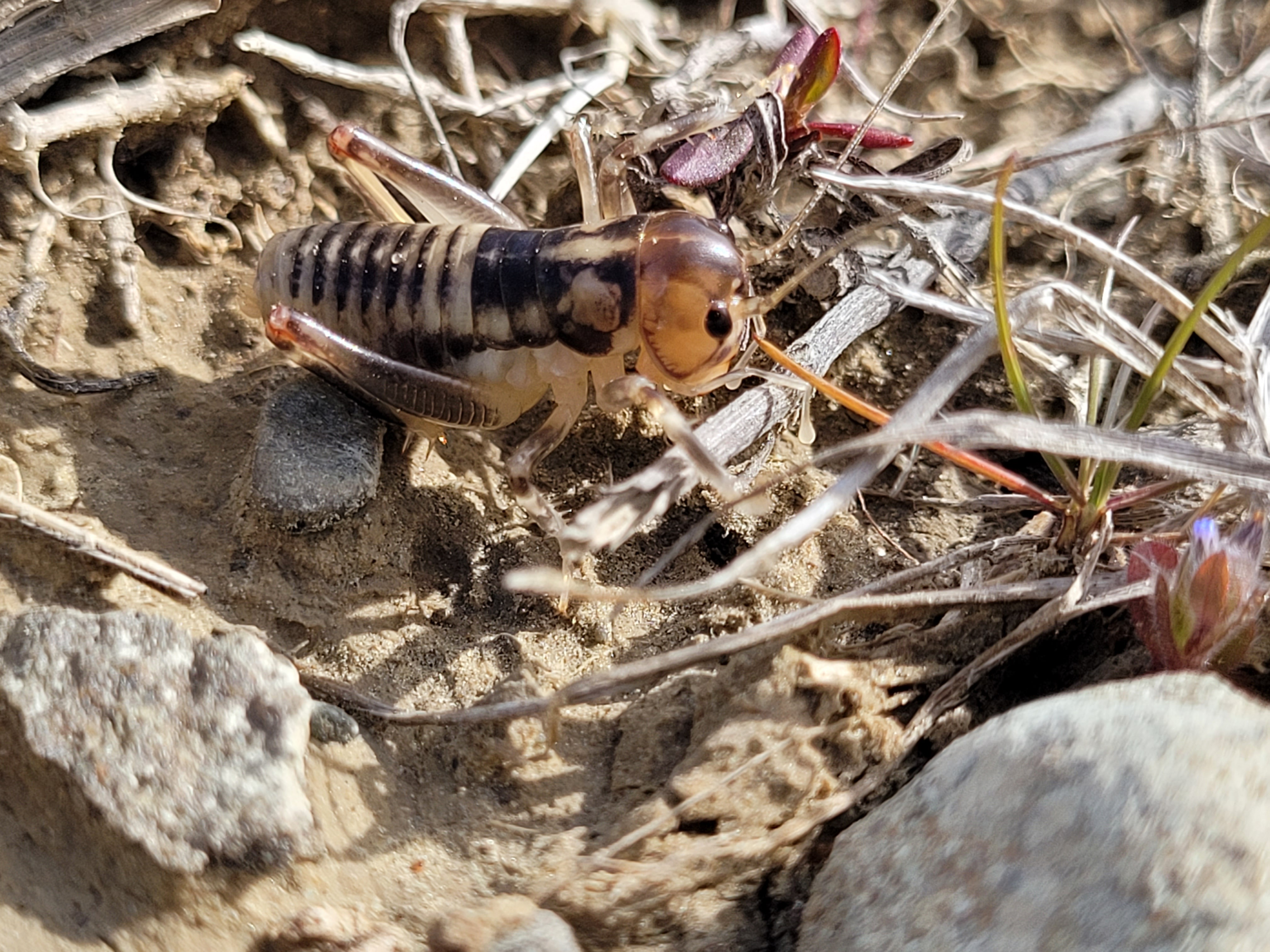

Conservation status
- Nationally Endangered (NZ TCS)

Scientific classification
- Kingdom: Animalia
- Phylum: Arthropoda
- Class: Insecta
- Order: Orthoptera
- Suborder: Ensifera
- Family: Anostostomatidae
- Genus: Hemiandrus
- Species: H. fabella

Binomial name
- Hemiandrus fabella Trewick & Morgan-Richards 2026

= Hemiandrus fabella =

Species of wētā

The ground wētā population near Lake Tekapo New Zealand was formally described in 2026. The informal 'tag' name Hemiandrus 'furoviarius' was given to this population by Peter Johns in 2001. Commonly known as the Tekapo ground wētā, it is a wētā of the family Anostostomatidae. They are a small, flightless, and nocturnal orthopteran endemic to the Mackenzie Basin of New Zealand's South Island.

== Taxonomy ==
Hemiandrus fabella is a ground wētā that was first discovered in 1992 in a study of invertebrates around the Tekapo River delta. In 2001 Peter Johns suggested this population was a separate species but it was not until 2026 that the species was described. Fabella means little bean, as this species is smaller than most Hemiandrus species. The lineage is closely related to another ground wētā in the surrounding region, the Timaru ground wētā (H. johnsi) named for Peter Johns. H. fabella has been used as a model species for the conservation of the Cromwell ground wētā.

== Habitat and distribution ==
The Tekapo ground wētā, Hemiandrus fabella, is a drylands species endemic to the Mackenzie Basin of New Zealand. They are distributed around river margins and terraces being dependent on the fine silty soils which facilitate burrowing. They are found in both introduced pine forests and degraded grasslands. In 2020 a large population was discovered inside a predator-proof fence in an area of public conservation land known as Patersons Terrace.

== Diet ==
Hemiandrus fabella is a nocturnally feeding omnivorous species. Dissections of Tekapo ground wētā crops found plant and animal remains, as well as fungal spores and inorganic detritus. Female and male wētā did not have significant differences in diet. The most common animal remains that could be identified were collembolan (Arthropleona). Other remains included the weevil (Otiorhynchus ovatus), a bug of the family Lygaeidae, and fragments of flies and aphids.

It is hypothesised that Hemiandrus fabella is an opportunist that supplements plant material with animal food when available as evidenced by many of the wētā with large numbers of collembolans in their crops being captured on rainy nights. It is unclear whether the larger arthropod prey are scavenged or captured but other Hemiandrus species are known to be predatory so the Tekapo ground wētā is likely to be as well.

== Morphology ==
Hemiandrus fabella is a small wētā species with a maximum hind femur length of 11.2 mm (0.44 in) for females and 10.6 mm (0.42 in) for males. Tekapo ground wētā are one of several Hemiandrus species with unusually short ovipositors as such it can be distinguished from one of its closest relatives, Hemiandrus johnsi (also known as the Timaru wētā), by its much shorter ovipositor. The Tekapo ground wētā also has two rows of (7-10) almost symmetrical spines on its tibiae which cover three-quarters of the tibia starting at the apical end. They can be distinguished from some other Hemiandrus species by an incomplete covering of hair on the 4th segment of the maxillary palps and a complete lack of hair on the 3rd segment.

== Behaviour ==
Hemiandrus fabella individuals held in laboratory conditions have been observed stridulating in early summer which likely corresponds with their mating behaviour. Tekapo ground wētā lifecycle is strongly tied to the seasons. No wētā have been trapped in winter field sampling indicating the wētā are inactive during the coldest months while laboratory specimens held at room temperature were occasionally active. Hemiandrus fabella therefore is not active when temperatures are low, remaining below ground.

Like other ground wētā, Hemiandrus fabella is a burrowing species. They construct short burrows with a 'foot' at the end, burrow entrances are then sealed with a dirt cap. A description of the burrowing technique from van Wyngaarden (1995), "The wētā anchors itself by all six legs. Soil is scooped under the head and pushed back both by the pivoting of the head and the rearward movement of the whole animal. The fore and hind legs help to position the pile of loose soil. After several 'scoops' of soil are collected under the abdomen, the pile is flicked out the back by two or more swift alternate kicks of the hind legs. Large pieces of sand, stones and debris (up to about the size of the wētā's head) are removed individually with the mandibles. Pieces larger than this are left and the burrow diverted around them".

Unlike other wētā species the Tekapo ground wētā does not have large spines on its hind legs which it can raise in defence or particularly large mandibles, instead it has been observed to jump erratically away from the threat.

== Breeding ==
Stridulation has been observed in laboratory specimens in early summer, this is likely when mating takes place. Oviposition occurs in mid to late summer, with the eggs deposited inside the females burrow. The eggs then overwinter in the burrow with the female and hatch in late spring the following year. It takes both male and female wētā two years to reach maturity. The females have nine instars while males have 10. After mating and oviposition the females will survive through the winter with their eggs while the males do not. While parental care is uncommon in orthopterans and other wētā genera, several other species of ground wētā have been observed to exhibit parental care with female wētā occupying burrows with both eggs and nymphs.

== Conservation ==
The conservation status of Hemiandrus fabella improved in 2022 from nationally critical to nationally endangered. The qualifiers for this status being the restricted range of the Tekapo ground wētā, it being endemic to the Mackenzie basin and the sparseness of population across its range. Tekapo ground wētā are known to be predated by several species of introduced invasive mammals. A 2005 study found wētā (of mostly Hemiandrus 'furoviarius') in 22% of hedgehog gut samples taken from the Mackenzie Basin. Hemiandrus fabella was also found in the gut tracts of 26% of female and 23% of male cats in a 1995 study. Juvenile cats in this study also consumed a greater number of Tekapo ground wētā compared to adult cats.
