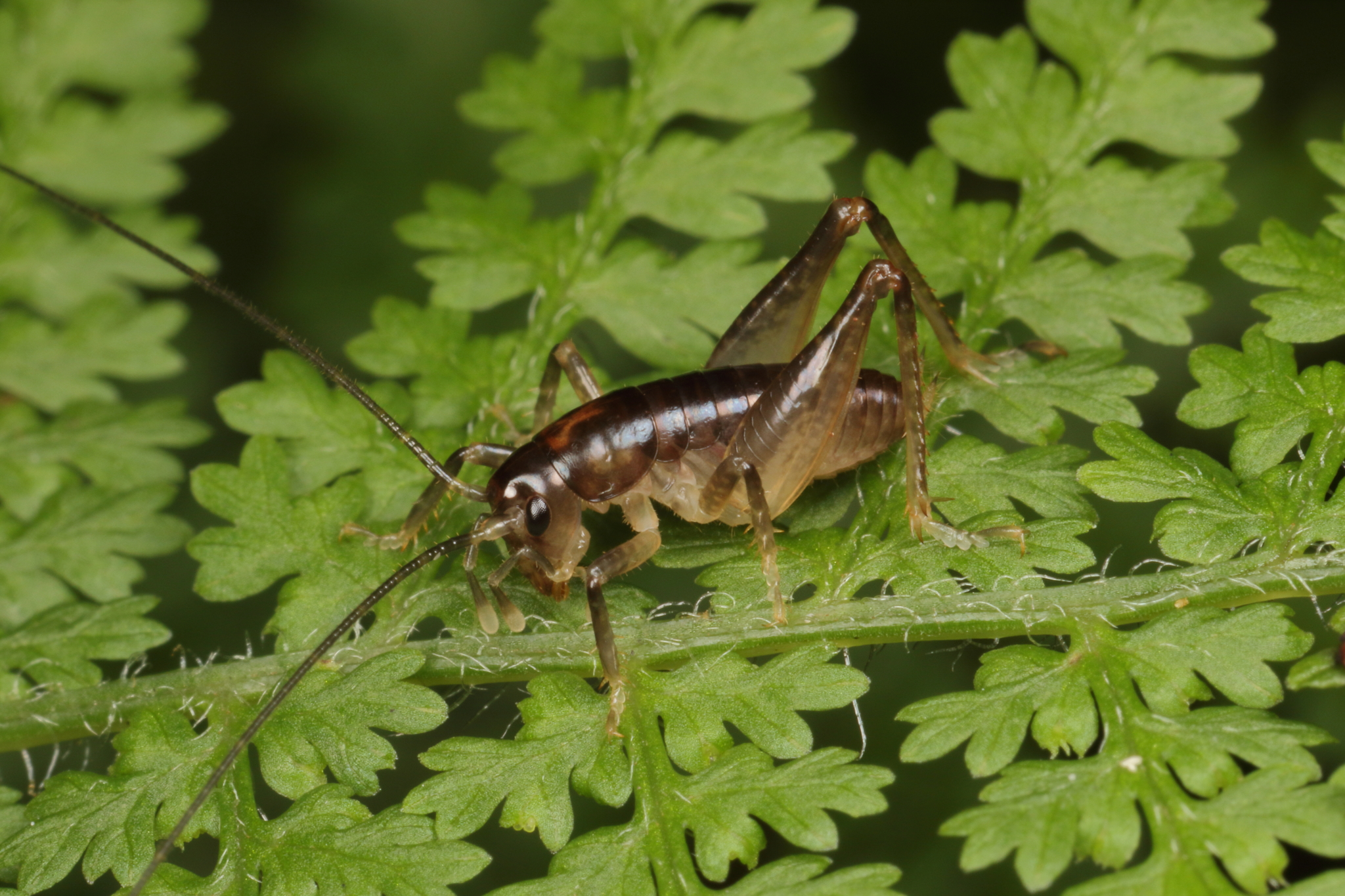

Conservation status
- Not Threatened (NZ TCS)

Scientific classification
- Kingdom: Animalia
- Phylum: Arthropoda
- Clade: Pancrustacea
- Class: Insecta
- Order: Orthoptera
- Suborder: Ensifera
- Family: Anostostomatidae
- Genus: Anderus
- Species: A. maculifrons

Binomial name
- Anderus maculifrons (Walker, 1869)

Synonyms
- Hemanandrus maculifrons (Walker, 1869); Hemidandrus maori Pictet & Saussure, 1891; Libanasa maculifrons Walker, 1869; Zealandosandrus gracilis Salmon, 1950

= Anderus maculifrons =

Species of orthopteran insect

Anderus maculifrons is a species of ground wētā (previously in the genus Hemiandrus Walker, 1869) endemic to New Zealand. They are nocturnal, carnivorous, and flightless orthopterans belonging to the family Anostostomatidae. Being a nocturnal species, individuals remain in tunnels in the ground during the day and emerge from their burrows after sunset to forage and hunt for small invertebrates. Anderus maculifrons is one of the smallest New Zealand wētā species, averaging 15 mm in length (from the head to the tip of the last abdominal segment, excluding ovipositor in females) and weighing 1–3 g. Unlike the tree wētā and tusked wētā, where sexual dimorphism is found in the form of male weaponry, ground wētā only exhibit sexual size dimorphism: the females are larger than the males.

== Morphology ==
Anderus maculifrons are characterized by a dark brown pronotum and upper abdomen, and a mottled femur. They are small to medium-sized, about 15 mm in length from the head to the tip of the abdomen. This species is very similar in appearance to three other Anderus (previously Hemiandrus) species found in New Zealand but can be recognized by a relatively long ovipositor in adult females. The head is shiny and brown with a darker shade on top, showing a faint pale dorsal midline. The antennae are longer than the body and the eyes are black. Ground wētā are sexually sized dimorphic, with the females larger than males, unlike closely related species. Females also have a long, gently curved ovipositor protruding from the end of their abdomen. A. maculifrons has very long legs, the hind femora is 2.8–3.5 times head width. Femora are cream coloured and gradually becoming brown to the tibiae, both femora and tibiae are spotted. Spines are also present, thirteen cream articulated spines on the fore tibiae; seventeen cream articulated spines with brown tips on the mid tibiae; and about thirty to forty-seven spines on the hind tibiae. Fore tibiae also lack tympanum. Adult males are characterised by the presence of bark, sclerotised hooks (falci) underneath the ninth abdominal tergite. Adult females are identified by the shape of subgenital plate and a sclerotised ovipositor.

== Distribution and habitat ==
Anderus maculifrons is widespread in forested parts of South Island New Zealand. In northern South Island A. maculifrons is sympatric with the morphologically very similar species H. luna, H. brucei and H. nox. These cryptic species are hosts to the intracellular bacteria Wolbachia, which might explain their speciation without ecological differentiation or geographic separation. Although the species-complex extends across Cook Strait, H. maculifrons is the only one of these cryptic species that is not found in North Island.

They hide during the day in tunnels in the ground (galleries) under moss, soil, leaf litter and rotting logs. Galleries are cavities that can extent up to 10 cm below the surface of the soil or moss, and are usually slightly wider than the wētā's body length. When they are constructed under rotting logs, often the log is incorporated into one side of the gallery.

== Diet ==
Anderus maculifrons are primarily predators and scavengers: they usually hunt and forage in forest litter and in trees at night. Both adults and juveniles eat a range of small invertebrates such as beetles, moths, and flies. Interestingly, there is a single case where mountain snowberry (Gaultheria depressa) seeds were found in the frass of a A. maculifrons. This could indicate that this species can be omnivorous.

== Breeding ==
Hemiandrus maculifrons has a non-seasonal life history: adults, young, and eggs can be found at any time of the year. Their food (the small leaf-litter invertebrates) do not change much in abundance over the year in New Zealand forests.

=== Courtship and copulation ===
Unlike other singing ensiferans, ground wētā do not have tibial tympanae. Sexually active males hit their abdomens on substrates, such as leaf or soil surfaces, to produce pre-copulation vibratory sounds as signals for mate attraction; this is known as drumming. The number of abdomen hits on the substrate, the duration of the drumming, and the intervals between drumming all differ between species, these vibrations are believed to be species specific. Pheromones produced from anal secretions may be involved in long-distance communication. After locating a mate, the male and female come into antenna to antenna contact. If the female is accepted by the male, the male then turns to face the same direction as the female and backs under her, or alternatively the female mounts the male. Once underneath the female, the male transports a spermatophore, consisting of a spermatophylax and an ampulla, to the female through genital contact. The spermatophylax is a large, gelatinous substance attached to the ejaculate and sperm containing ampulla. The spermatopylax protects the ampulla from being eaten by the female while the sperm and ejaculate are transferred from the ampulla to the female.

=== Nuptial feeding and post-copulatory guarding ===
Males of the members of the orthopteran family provide a nuptial gift to the female. The nuptial gift is produced from a gland on the dorsal surface of the male's metanotum, in this case the spermatophylax, and females consume this while the sperms are transferred from the ampulla. The female also bends to eat the ampulla post copulation (while she finished eating the spermatophylax). The nuptial gift is considered a mechanism which increases the number of sperm transferred into the female, by delaying the female from removing or eating the ampulla. Studies also show that nuptial gifts provide females with additional resources (amino acids) which the females allocate into their ovaries and eggs, thus increases egg production and egg quality. The males remain with the females after copulation while she consumes the spermatophylax. Post-copulatory guarding is thought to keep rivals males from disrupting insemination.

=== Oviposition ===
The female A. maculifrons has a long ovipositor which it uses to insert eggs into her tunnel (gallery) walls. A. maculifrons are not known to exhibit maternal care of eggs or young. Observations of related ground wētā species found that females remain in their galleries with the eggs without emerging for several months after oviposition, tending to the nymphs; however, parental care is unusual for ground wētā species with long ovipositors. It may take several days for the females to oviposit a batch of eggs, and the egg incubation period is around 12–18 months. Environmental conditions such as seasonal temperature fluctuations will impact egg development, thus the incubation period.

== Taxonomy ==
Apart from Hemiandrus, Anostostomatidae consists of three other New Zealand genera and about twenty-three other genera from Australia, Africa, South America and New Caledonia. In New Zealand are the tree wētā (Hemideina White, 1846), the giant wētā (Deinacrida White, 1846), and the tusked wētā (Anisoura Ander, 1938, Motuweta Johns, 1997); with the genus Hemiandrus being the most speciose group. Anderus maculifrons is one of the most widespread ground wētā species in New Zealand.

Anderus maculifrons was first described by Walker in 1869. In 1997, Johns synonymised two Hemiandrus species H. maori (Pictet & Saussure 1893) and H. gracilis (Salmon 1950) with H. maculifrons. in 2024 the genus Hemiandrus was shown to be paraphyletic with respect to a number of Australian genera so the New Zealand species were divided into two genera (Hemiandrus and Anderus). A. maculifrons is a cryptic species complex which comprises multiple species that all look very similar. Both specimens used by Pictet and Saussure (1893) and Salmon (1950) for their description appeared to belong to the same species of the A. maculifrons complex which were from the southernmost populations (body length varies from the northern to the southern population with the southern population being the largest). The southernmost species of this complex retained the name maculifrons whilst the others were given new names. A morphological and genetic study published in 2016 separated two new species from the specific name A. maculifrons: Anderus luna and Anderus brucei. These three species can be distinguished by the particular shape of the adult male terminalia and presence and absence of particular leg spines.

== Conservation status ==
Under the New Zealand Threat Classification System, this species is listed as "Not Threatened".
