= Spermatophylax =

A spermatophylax is a gelatinous bolus which some male insects eject during copulation with females through their aedeagi together with spermatophores, and which functions as a nutritive supplement for the female.

== See also ==
- Nuptial gift
