= Kjell Ernst Viktor Ander =

Swedish entomologist

Kjell Ernst Viktor Ander (born 1902 - died 1992) was a Swedish entomologist. Ander was admitted as Doctor of Philosophy at Lund University in 1939. Ander worked as a docent at Lund University from 1937 to 1951.

In 1938 Ander described the New Zealand genus Hemiandrus (Orthoptera; Anostostomatidae) and made considerable progress sorting the genera from Australia, Africa and America within the family Anostostomatidae. In 2024 a genus of orthoptera endemic to New Zealand was named for Ander: Anderus.
