= Mary Morgan-Richards =

New Zealand academic

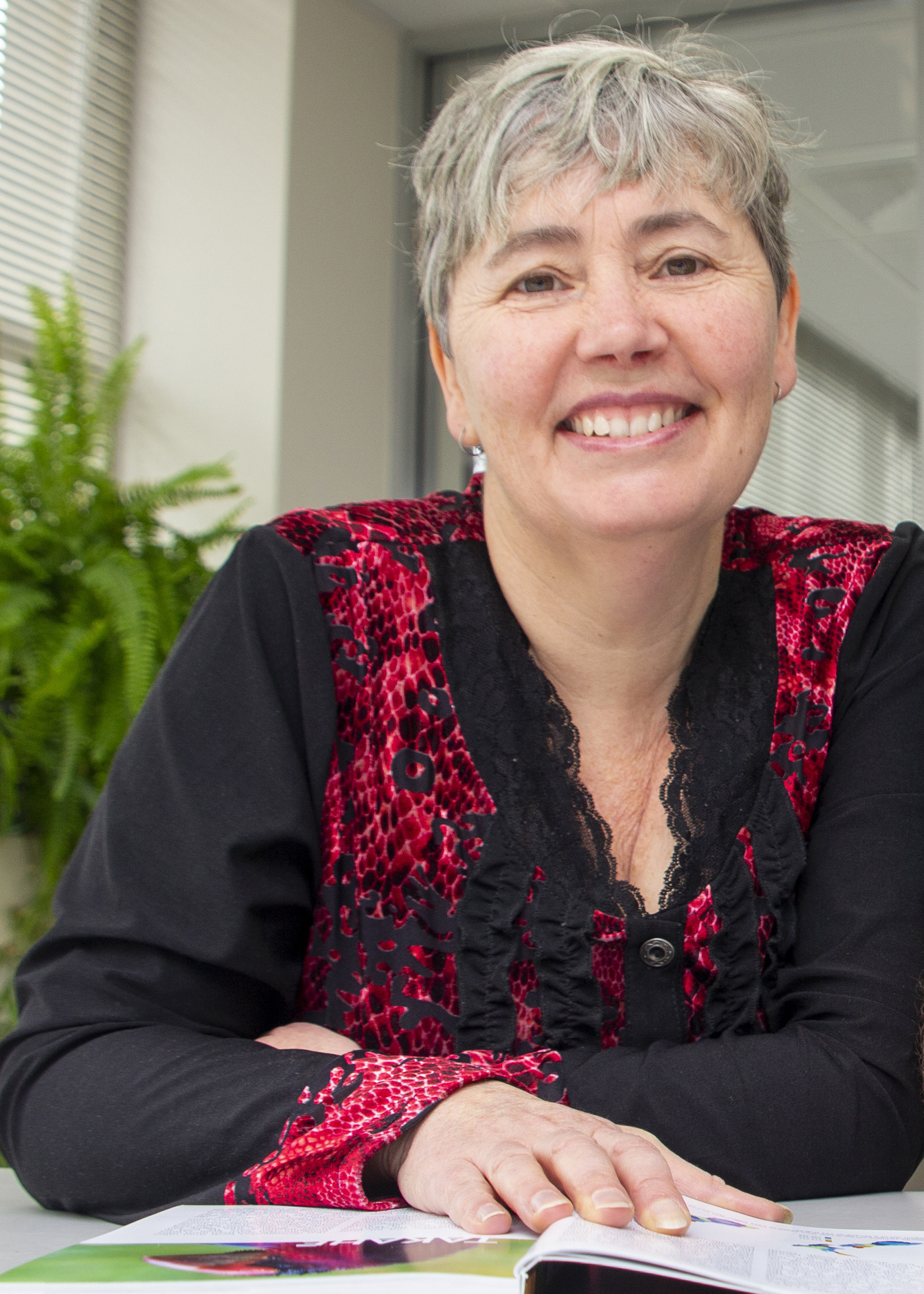
- Mary Morgan-Richards in 2019
- Education: Victoria University of Wellington
- Scientific career
- Fields: Evolutionary biology
- Workplaces: Massey University
- Thesis: Weta Karyotypes: the Systematic Significance of Their Variation (1995)
- Website: evolves.massey.ac.nz

Mary Morgan-Richards is a New Zealand biologist, and as of 2019 is a full professor at Massey University.

== Academic career ==
In 1995, Morgan-Richards completed a PhD thesis titled 'Weta Karyotypes: the Systematic Significance of Their Variation' at the Victoria University of Wellington. Between 1996 and 2003, she worked at the University of St Andrews, University of Otago, the Natural History Museum, London, and the University of Canterbury successively. In 2005 Morgan-Richards moved to the Massey University, rising to full professor in 2018.

== Research ==
Morgan-Richard's research has focused on topics in evolutionary biology such as speciation and hybridisation, as well as conservation biology, using population genetics, and phylogenetic methods.

Native New Zealand invertebrates including wētā, stick insects, and snails are often the subject of her research. She has scientifically described multiple species of wētā. Morgan-Richard's phylogenetic research has also focused on birds and their parasites.

== Taxa named in Morgan-Richard's honour ==
- Occultastella morgana Trewick, 2024
- Peripatoides morgani Trewick, 1998

== Books ==
- Trewick, Steve, & Morgan-Richards, Mary. (2019). Wild Life New Zealand. Hand-in-Hand Press, New Zealand, ISBN 978-0-473-48320-3.

== Selected research ==
- Morgan-Richards, Mary, Trewick, Steve A., Bartosch-Härlid, Anna, Kardailsky, Olga, Phillips, Matthew J., McLenachan, Patricia A., & Penny, David. (2008). "Bird evolution: testing the Metaves clade with six new mitochondrial genomes." BMC Evolutionary Biology 8 (1): 20.
- Pratt, Renae C., Gibb, Gillian C., Morgan-Richards, Mary, Phillips, Matthew J., Hendy, Michael D., & Penny, David. (2008). "Toward resolving deep Neoaves phylogeny: data, signal enhancement, and priors." Molecular Biology and Evolution 26 (2): 313–326.
- Pratt, Renae C., Morgan-Richards, Mary, & Trewick, Steve A. (2008). "Diversification of New Zealand weta (Orthoptera: Ensifera: Anostostomatidae) and their relationships in Australasia." Philosophical Transactions of the Royal Society B: Biological Sciences 363 (1508): 3427–3437.
- Trewick, Steven A., & Morgan‐Richards, Mary. (2005). "After the deluge: mitochondrial DNA indicates Miocene radiation and Pliocene adaptation of tree and giant weta (Orthoptera: Anostostomatidae)." Journal of Biogeography 32 (2): 295–309.
