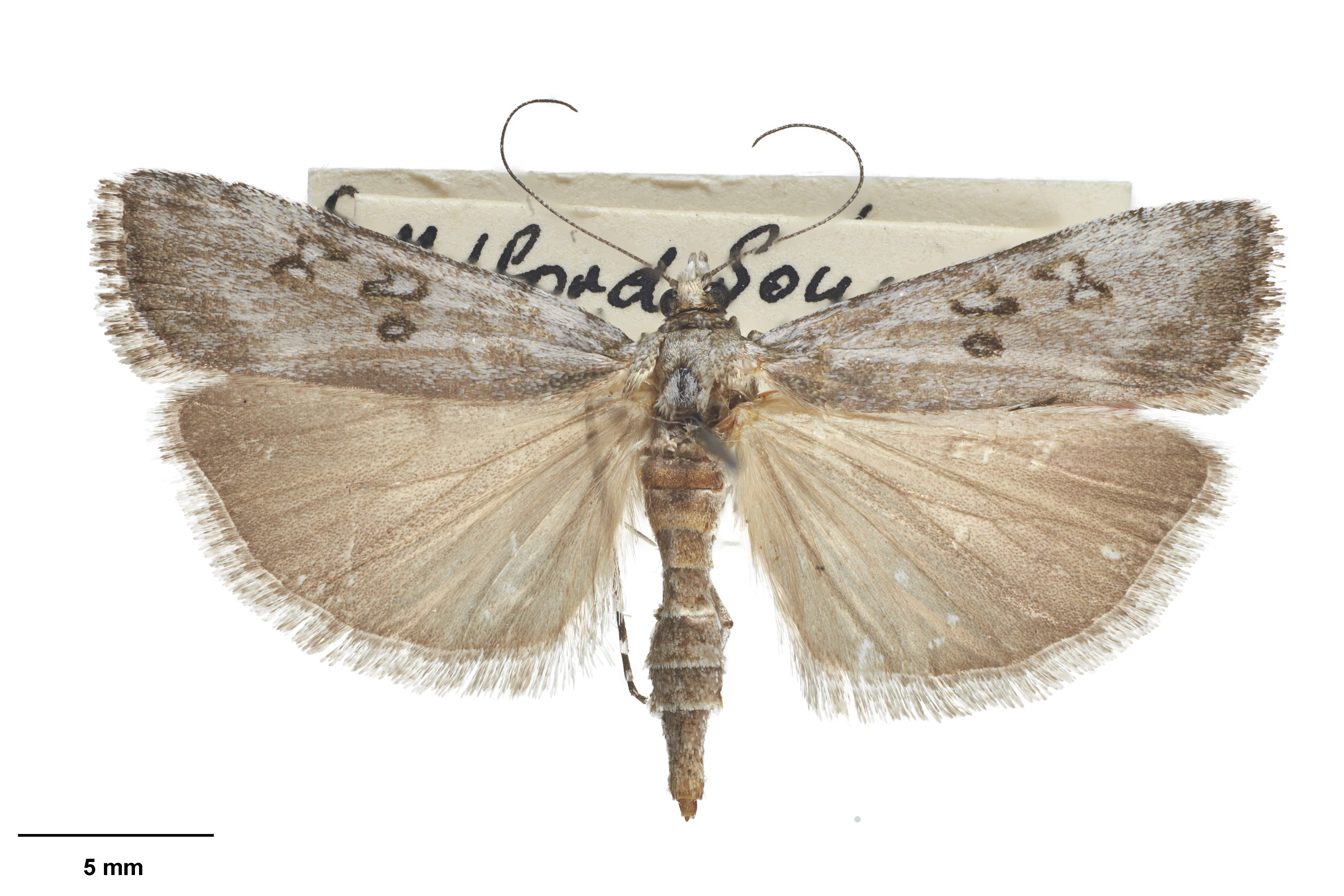
- Holotype

Scientific classification
- Kingdom: Animalia
- Phylum: Arthropoda
- Clade: Pancrustacea
- Class: Insecta
- Order: Lepidoptera
- Family: Crambidae
- Genus: Scoparia
- Species: S. monochroma

Binomial name
- Scoparia monochroma Salmon, 1946

= Scoparia monochroma =

Species of moth endemic to New Zealand

Scoparia monochroma is a species of moth in the family Crambidae. It is endemic to New Zealand and has been observed in the lower half of the South Island. This species was first described by John Salmon in 1946. Adult moths are on the wing from December to February and are attracted to light. They are able to fly in light to medium breezes.

== Taxonomy ==
S. monochroma was first described by John Salmon in 1946 using specimens collected by himself via a light trap in the early evening. However, the placement of this species within the genus Scoparia is in doubt. As a result, this species has also been referred to as Scoparia (s.l.) monochroma. Robert Hoare has pointed out that this species and S. crepuscula are both closely related to S. tetracycla and may possibly be forms of that latter species. He argues that S. tetracycla is likely closely related to E. diphtheralis and as such the taxonomy of this group of species is in need of further study. The male holotype specimen was collected at Arthur River in the Milford Sound and is held at Te Papa.

== Description ==
The wingspan of S. monochroma is 30 mm. The head is a reddish yellow colour with silver white flecks. This silver white colouration appears on the abdomen and thorax with the abdomen also shaded with deep orange. The end of the abdomen also has a slight tinge of orange. The antennae are dark brown coloured with silver and have palpi are coloured silver white. The forewings are grey and reddish-brown coloured and have grey white flecks. The forewings have kidney shaped, circular and club shaped dots that are coloured silver white and have black edges. The hairs on the edge of the wing have bands that are reddish-brown-grey. The hindwings sparkle slightly, and are coloured a grey-reddish-brown. The wing veins are a darker shade and the hairs on the edge of the hindwing are reddish-brown in appearance with bands in a darker shade.

Salmon pointed out that this species is similar in appearance to both S. crepuscula and S. tetracycla but argued that S. monochroma was distinct from S. crepuscula and that both species differed from S. tetracycla in "size, colour and detailed markings".

== Distribution ==
This species is endemic to New Zealand. It has been observed in Fiordland and Canterbury.

== Behaviour ==
Adults are on the wing between December and February and are attracted to light. Adult moths are able to fly during light to medium breezes.
