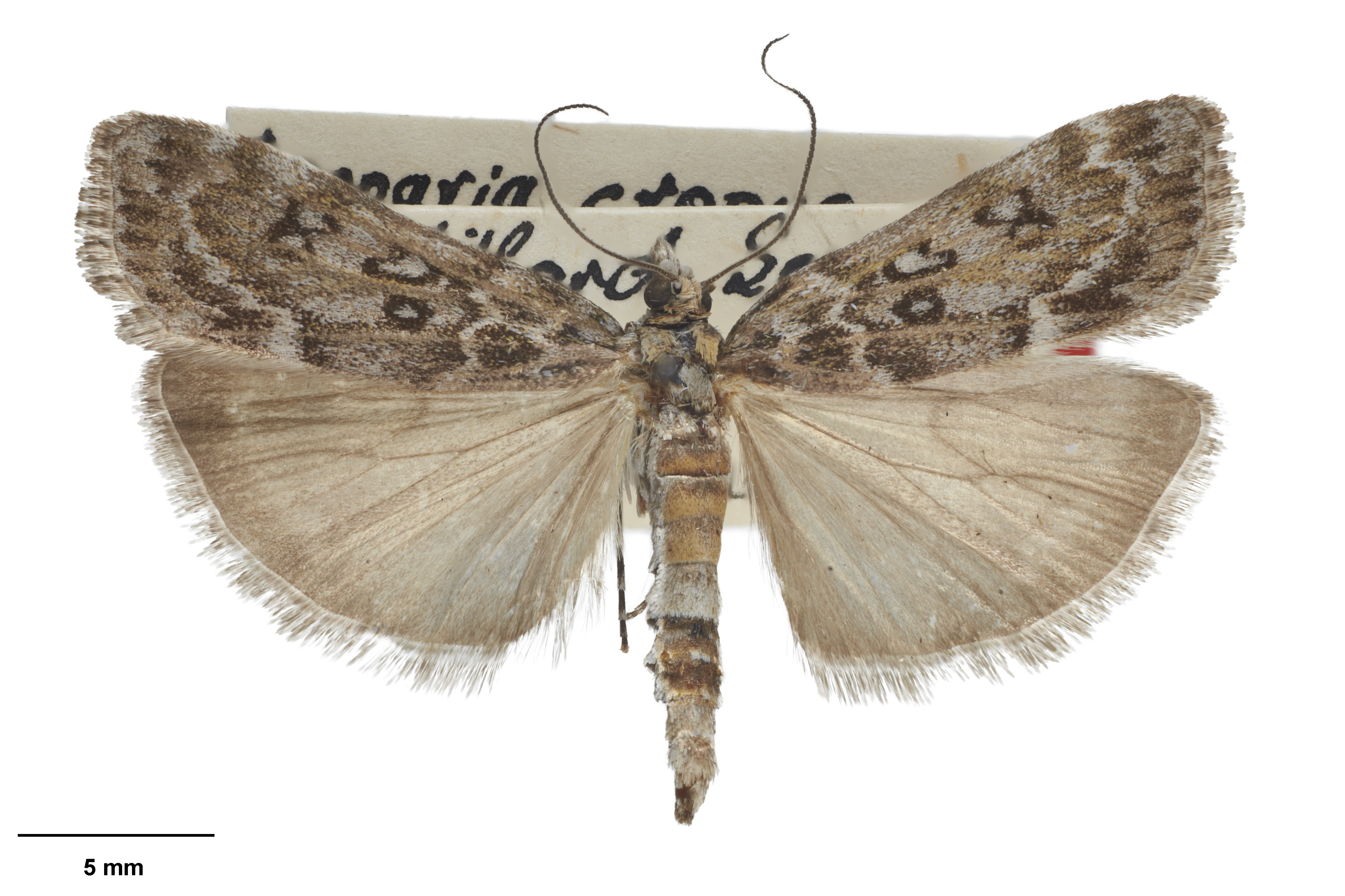
- Holotype

Scientific classification
- Kingdom: Animalia
- Phylum: Arthropoda
- Clade: Pancrustacea
- Class: Insecta
- Order: Lepidoptera
- Family: Crambidae
- Genus: Scoparia
- Species: S. crepuscula

Binomial name
- Scoparia crepuscula Salmon, 1946

= Scoparia crepuscula =

Species of moth endemic to New Zealand

Scoparia crepuscula is a species of moth in the family Crambidae. It is endemic to New Zealand and has been observed in Fiordland. It was first described by John Salmon in 1946. Adults are on the wing from December until January and are attracted to light.

== Taxonomy ==
S. crepuscula was first described by John Salmon in 1946 and named Scoparia crepuscula using specimens collected by himself via a light trap in the early evening. However the placement of this species within the genus Scoparia is in doubt. As a result, this species has also been referred to as Scoparia (s.l.) crepuscula. Robert Hoare has pointed out that this species and S. monochroma are both closely related to S. tetracycla and may possibly be forms of that latter species. He argued that S. tetracycla is likely closely related to E. diphtheralis and as such the taxonomy of this group of species is in need of further study. The male holotype specimen was collected at Arthur River in the Milford Sound and is held at Te Papa.

== Description ==
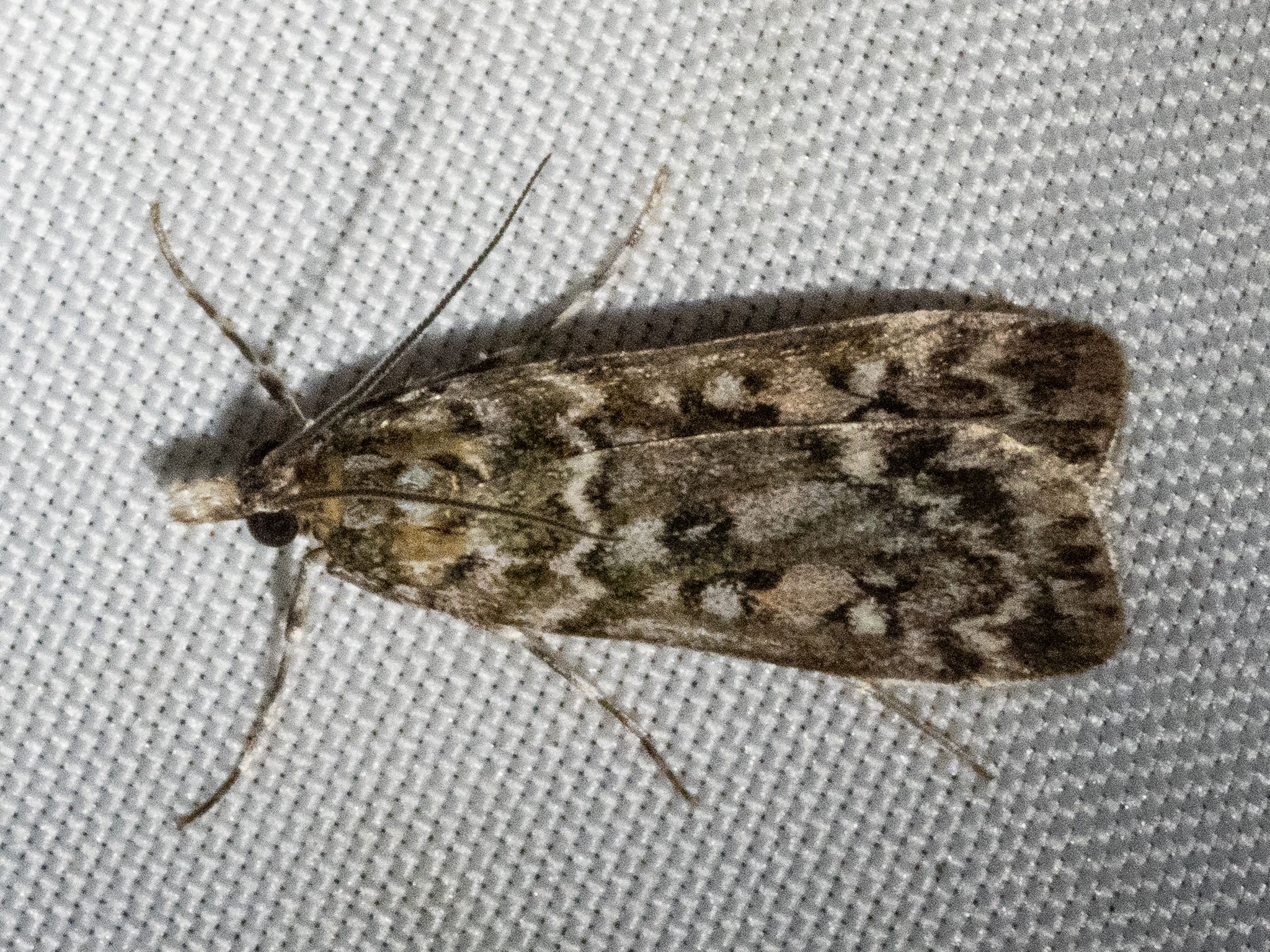
Living specimen

The wingspan of S. crepuscula is 30 mm. The head and thorax are a dark reddish brown colour with silver white flecks. The palpi are coloured silver white. The abdomen is silvery reddish brown with silver and on the upper surface has alternate bands of orange and then dark grey brown colour. The end of the abdomen has a slight tinge of orange. The forewings have a ground colour of dark brown grey and have a hint of sparkle with some sliver white as well as green shading in the middle. The forewings have kidney shaped, circular and club shaped dots that are coloured silver white and have heavy black edges. The forewings are also crossed with white lines near the base of the forewings and again distally. The hairs on the edge of the forewing are brown shading to brownish red and have bands that are brown. The forewings are brownish red in colour, also slightly sparkle and have darker shading around the outer edge of the wing. The hairs on the edge of the hingwing are brown shading to brownish red distally.

Salmon pointed out that this species is similar in appearance to both S. monochroma and S. tetracycla but argued that S. crepuscula was distinct from S. monochroma and that both species differed from S. tetracycla in "size, colour and detailed markings".

== Distribution ==
This species is endemic to New Zealand. It has been observed in Fiordland.

== Behaviour ==
Adult moths are on the wing from December to January and are attracted to light.
