= Sminthurinus elegans =

- 1. Sminthurinus elegans found in Bryn-Mawr/Skyway, WA.
- 2. Sminthurinus elegans found in Downtown Renton, WA

Scientific classification
- Kingdom: Animalia
- Phylum: Arthropoda
- Clade: Pancrustacea
- Class: Collembola
- Order: Symphypleona
- Family: Katiannidae
- Genus: Sminthurinus
- Species: S. elegans

Binomial name
- Sminthurinus elegans (Fitch, 1863)

Synonyms
- Smynthurus elegans Fitch, 1863; Sminthurus quadrilineatus Tullberg, 1871

Species of springtail

Sminthurinus elegans found in England, UK

Sminthurinus elegans, the changing color sminthurinus, is a species of springtail in the genus Sminthurinus found in Europe, and introduced to North America.

== Range ==
This species can be found all across the United States and Canada. In its native range it is found in Eastern and Western Europe, ranging into the Middle East (it has been found in Iran.).

== Color forms ==
This species is extremely variable with many different patterns. Many of these were given names by Frans Jessens, but since then many more color forms have been discovered (notably in North America), therefore community consensus is that this is one species with many forms.

== Overall appearance ==
Overall the young springtails appear as a small yellow springtail, with two lines on its sides, and a line through the middle. This line is sometimes non apparent and if so there is a empty yellow oval pattern on the back.

Older springtails can be much darker to pure black (they darken as they age). These are distinguished from other darker springtails in North America by having bright yellowish purple antenna.

== Habitat ==
This species is found on rotting wood and on mushrooms.

== Genetic investigation ==
there are multiple genetic sequences that branch off of this species that are of note that slightly differ from the normal Sminthurinus elegans species, which may in the future be counted as subspecies. These are labeled by their BOLD numbers and can be found listed on GBIF.

== Similar species ==
there are multiple similar species that have been recorded. In Europe the similar Sminthurinus aureus occurs, which is differentiated microsopically when the dorsal line or side stripes are not apparent, or if its in its dark form, since they look the same in that case.

In North America there is a similar species on the west coast called Sminthurinus maculosis, which differs from Sminthurinus elegans microscopically. It ranges from Oregon to California but may have a larger range. It has not been found since its discription and therefore little is know about it. It is also apparently found in the east coast of the United States as well.
