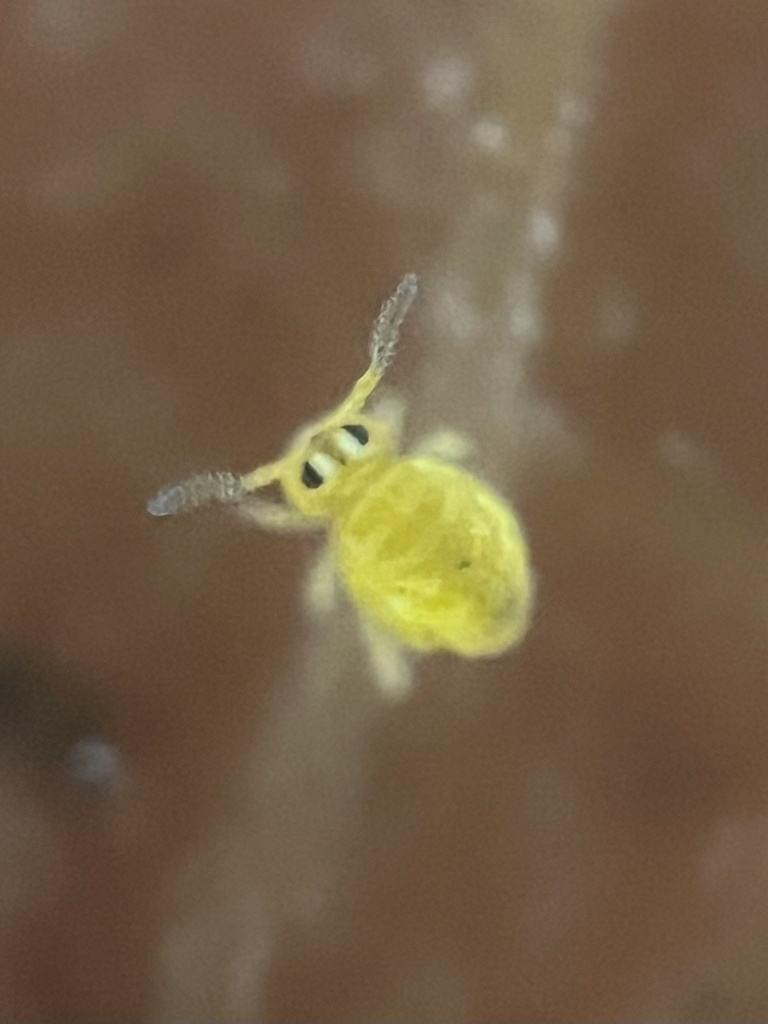

Scientific classification
- Kingdom: Animalia
- Phylum: Arthropoda
- Clade: Pancrustacea
- Class: Collembola
- Order: Symphypleona
- Family: Katiannidae
- Genus: Sminthurinus
- Species: S. reticulatus

Binomial name
- Sminthurinus reticulatus Cassagnau, 1964

= Sminthurinus reticulatus =

Species of springtail

Sminthurinus reticulatus is a springtail in the genus Sminthurinus. It is native to Eurasia, but has naturalized in the United States.

== Apprearence ==
This species is yellowish in overall coloration, with stripes down the back. It also has a distinct pattern near the posterior likened to an electric guitar in shape. The antennae are white in coloration, and these springtails have prominent “eyebrows”. These springtails are extremely small, being less than or equal to a millimeter in size.

== Similar species ==
This species is similar to S. aureus but differs in having both 3-4 transverse bands and the addition of dark lateral banding.

This species can have side bands but differs from S. elegans because the sides and dorsal stripes are lighter, alongside the lack of a stripe down the middle.

== Habitat ==
It lives in wet areas, usually in or on moss, under leaf litter, or on wet wood in the fall and winter months.

== Diet ==
This species eats dead leaves and dead wood, and yeast that grows on said substrates.

== Agricultural Significance ==
This species is of no agricultural concern. Though introduced, because of its diet, it is generally considered harmless.

== Environmental Significance ==
This is a non predatory species of springtail and therefore is not an ecological concern.

== Original Description ==
This species was described by french entomologist Paul Cassagnu in 1964 in the publication Faune francaise des Collemboles. XIII: Sur les Collemboles epiges de la vallee d'Aure (Hautes-Pyrenees) et sur quelques especes nouvelles du Sud-Ouest et des Pyrenees. Bulletin de la Societe d'Histoire naturelle de Toulouse 99: on pages 463 - 483.
