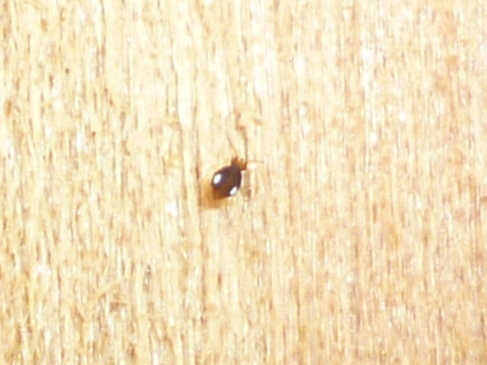

Scientific classification
- Domain: Eukaryota
- Kingdom: Animalia
- Phylum: Arthropoda
- Class: Collembola
- Order: Symphypleona
- Family: Katiannidae
- Genus: Sminthurinus
- Species: S. quadrimaculatus

Binomial name
- Sminthurinus quadrimaculatus (Ryder, 1879)

Synonyms
- Sminthurinus brunneus Maynard, 1951; Sminthurinus downsi Maynard, 1951; Sminthurinus minutus Macgillivray, 1894; Sminthurinus quadrimaculatus latipictus Maynard, 1951; Sminthurinus remotus Folsom, 1896; Sminthurinus sexmaculatus Harvey, 1892; Smynthurus quadrimaculatus Ryder, 1879

= Sminthurinus quadrimaculatus =

Species of springtail

Sminthurinus quadrimaculatus is a species of globular springtail in the family Katiannidae.

== Subspecies ==
These two subspecies belong to the species Sminthurinus quadrimaculatus:

- Sminthurinus quadrimaculatus bimaculatus Maynard
- Sminthurinus quadrimaculatus quadrimaculatus
