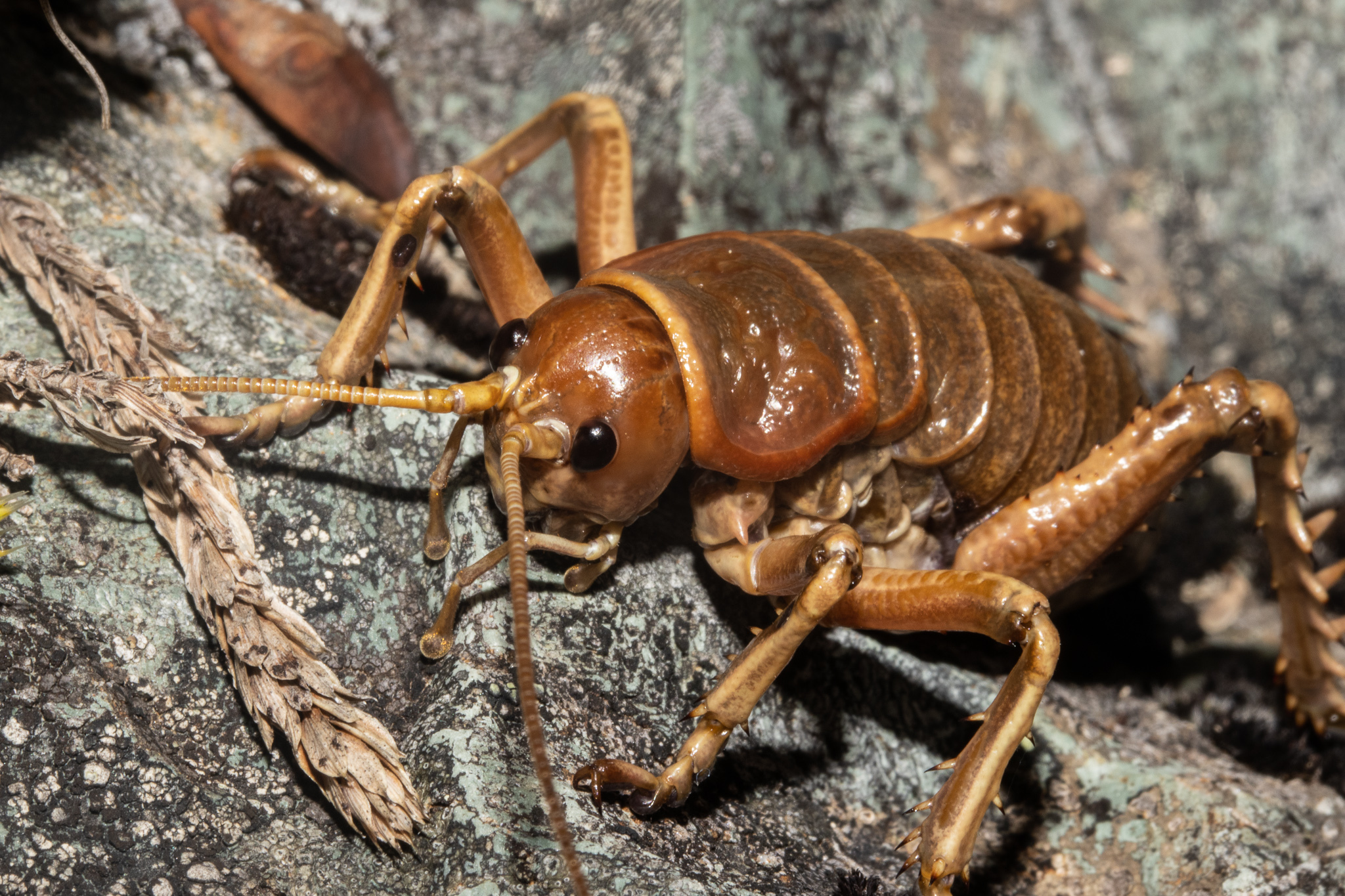

Conservation status
- Sparse (NZ TCS)

Scientific classification
- Kingdom: Animalia
- Phylum: Arthropoda
- Class: Insecta
- Order: Orthoptera
- Suborder: Ensifera
- Family: Anostostomatidae
- Genus: Deinacrida
- Species: D. tibiospina

Binomial name
- Deinacrida tibiospina Salmon, 1950

= Deinacrida tibiospina =

Species of orthopteran insect

Deinacrida tibiospina, also known as the Mt Arthur giant wētā or the Nelson alpine giant wētā, is a species of wētā in the family Anostostomatidae. It is endemic to the South Island of New Zealand. The wētā is only found in some alpine zones of Kahurangi National Park. Compared with natural densities of other wētā, D. tibiospina is fairly rare. Little conservation effort has been made for this species because, despite its elusiveness, populations on the mainland have been maintained without human intervention.

== Description ==
As one of the smallest known species of giant wētā, Deinacrida tibiospina grows to only around 30-40mm long, and weigh just 7 grams. Like many other giant wētā, such as Deinacrida rugosa, the overlapping armoured plates on their back are wrinkled. Adults of the species can be varying shades of brown, sometimes with a reddish hue. Their bodies have a compressed appearance and dense spines on the upper side of their hind femurs. As with almost all wētā, D. tibiospina are wingless.

There is sexual dimorphism in this species. Female D. tibiospina are larger than males, a common trait in many Orthoptera. Males of the species also have fewer hind femoral spines than females.

== Distribution and habitat ==
Deinacrida tibiospina live in alpine areas of Kahurangi National Park, located at the North-Western corner of New Zealand's South Island. The wētā dwell above the tree line in sub-alpine tussock and herbfield zones of mountains, observed at altitudes between 900 and 1500 meters. Populations of D. tibiospina occur at very low densities at scattered localities within the central and eastern areas of what was North-West Nelson Forest Park.

== Biology ==
Throughout the day, Deinacrida tibiospina often shelter at the base of tussocks, Astelia, flax and other alpine plants. Their lifespan may be 2–3 years as wild populations have been observed with 3 distinct age classes in February and March. Like other wētā, D. tibiospina are nocturnal, but they may be comparatively inactive because of the cold temperatures in their alpine habitat.

Little research has been completed on the diet of D. tibiospina but they do not seem to like peanut butter, used as a lure for monitoring methods, as much as other wētā.

== Taxonomy ==
Deinacrida tibiospina was first described in 1950 by New Zealand scientist John Salmon. The species name tibiospina translates to tibia spine, or shin spine. This is likely a reference to the species' densely spined hind legs. Why the species is not called femoraspina because most of its spines are on the femurs, not the tibia, is a mystery.

Current phylogenetic and systematic research suggests Deinacrida tibiospina is a sister species of the lowland species D. carinata.

== Threats ==
The low density of Deinacrida tibiospina may be natural or it could be a result of human impacts. If the latter is true, human-introduced mammalian predators such as rodents may threaten D. tibiospina populations, as other giant wētā species have been significantly impacted where these predators exist. It is not certain, though, if D. tibiospina are as at risk to mammalian predation as rodents may not be abundant at high elevation. A 2010 study using footprint tracking tunnels found that mouse populations did overlap D. tibiospina habitat, however, wētā density was the highest at locations with the fewest mouse observations. These findings may imply that D. tibiospina are indeed negatively impacted by mice.

== Conservation ==
In comparison with its close relatives, Deinacrida tibiospina has not received a great amount of conservation work. In 1989, a Department of Conservation report listed Deinacrida tibiospina as needing urgent research to prevent extinction, but by 1998 the Department of Conservation Threatened Weta Recovery Plan listed D. tibiospina as low priority for conservation management.

A University of Otago study found tracking tunnels were not reliable for monitoring the species because their scarcity and lack of attraction to peanut butter lures results in low counts. One generation of Deinacrida tibiospina has, however, been successfully bred in captivity, generating hope for conservation efforts should the species need them.
