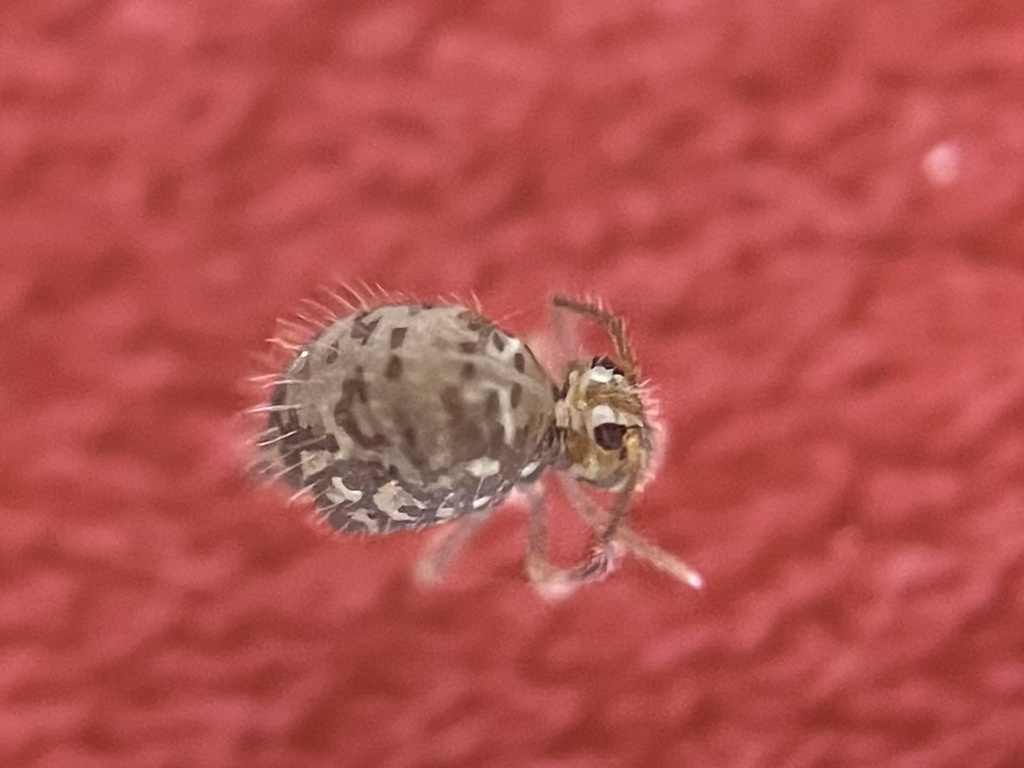
- In a grassy field in North Carolina

Scientific classification
- Kingdom: Animalia
- Phylum: Arthropoda
- Class: Collembola
- Order: Symphypleona
- Family: Katiannidae
- Genus: Katianna
- Species: K. maryae

Binomial name
- Katianna maryae Bernard, EC, 2014

= Katianna maryae =

Species of springtail

Katianna maryae is a species of springtail in the genus Katianna endemic to the East Coast of North America.

This species is characterized by its distinct military camouflage-like pattern. It has distinctly spiked antenna and a fishbone striping down its abdomen.
