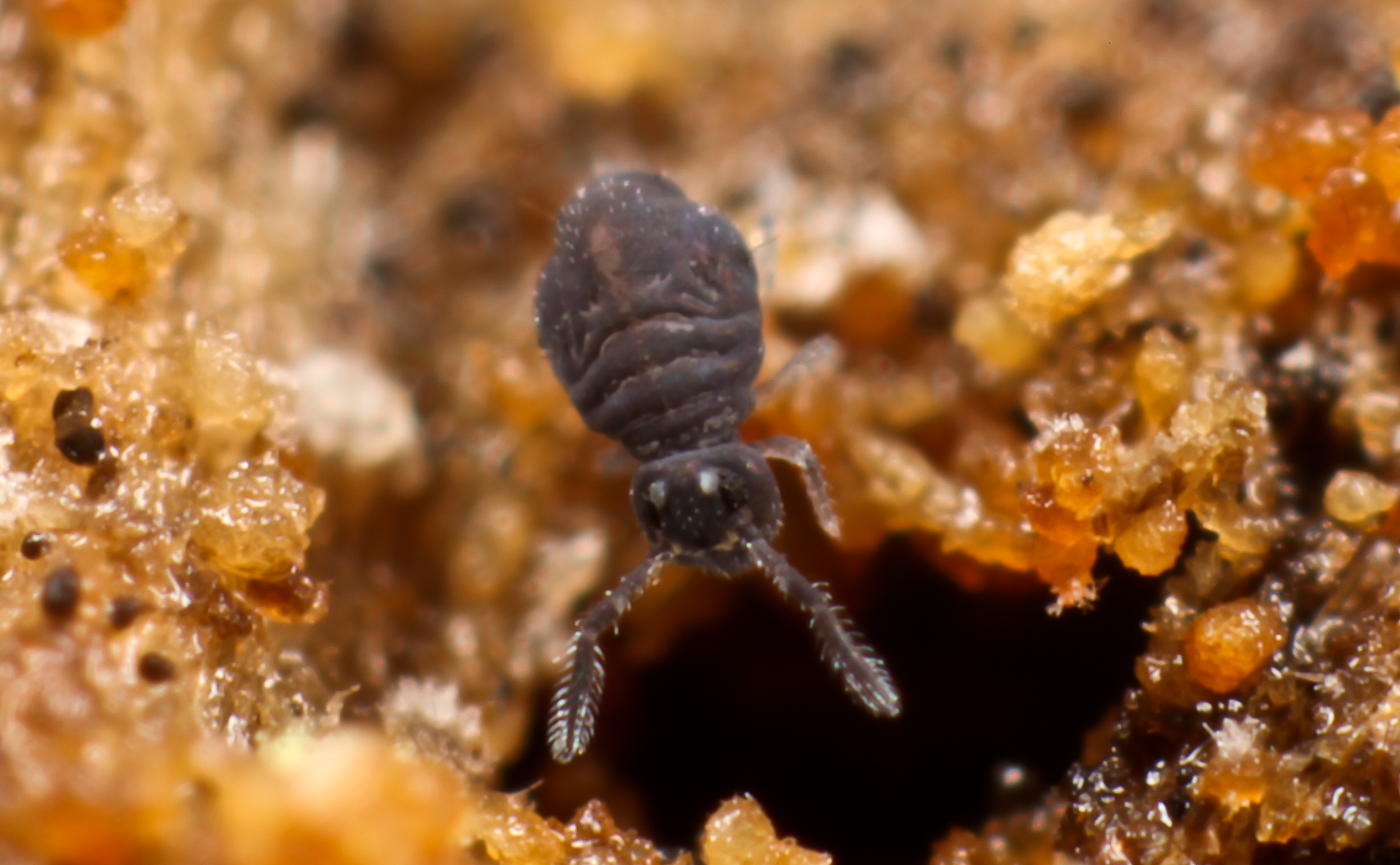

Scientific classification
- Domain: Eukaryota
- Kingdom: Animalia
- Phylum: Arthropoda
- Class: Collembola
- Order: Symphypleona
- Family: Katiannidae
- Genus: Sminthurinus
- Species: S. niger

Binomial name
- Sminthurinus niger (Lubbock, 1868)

Synonyms
- Smynthurus niger Lubbock, 1868

= Sminthurinus niger =

Species of springtail

Sminthurinus niger is a species of globular springtails in the family Katiannidae.

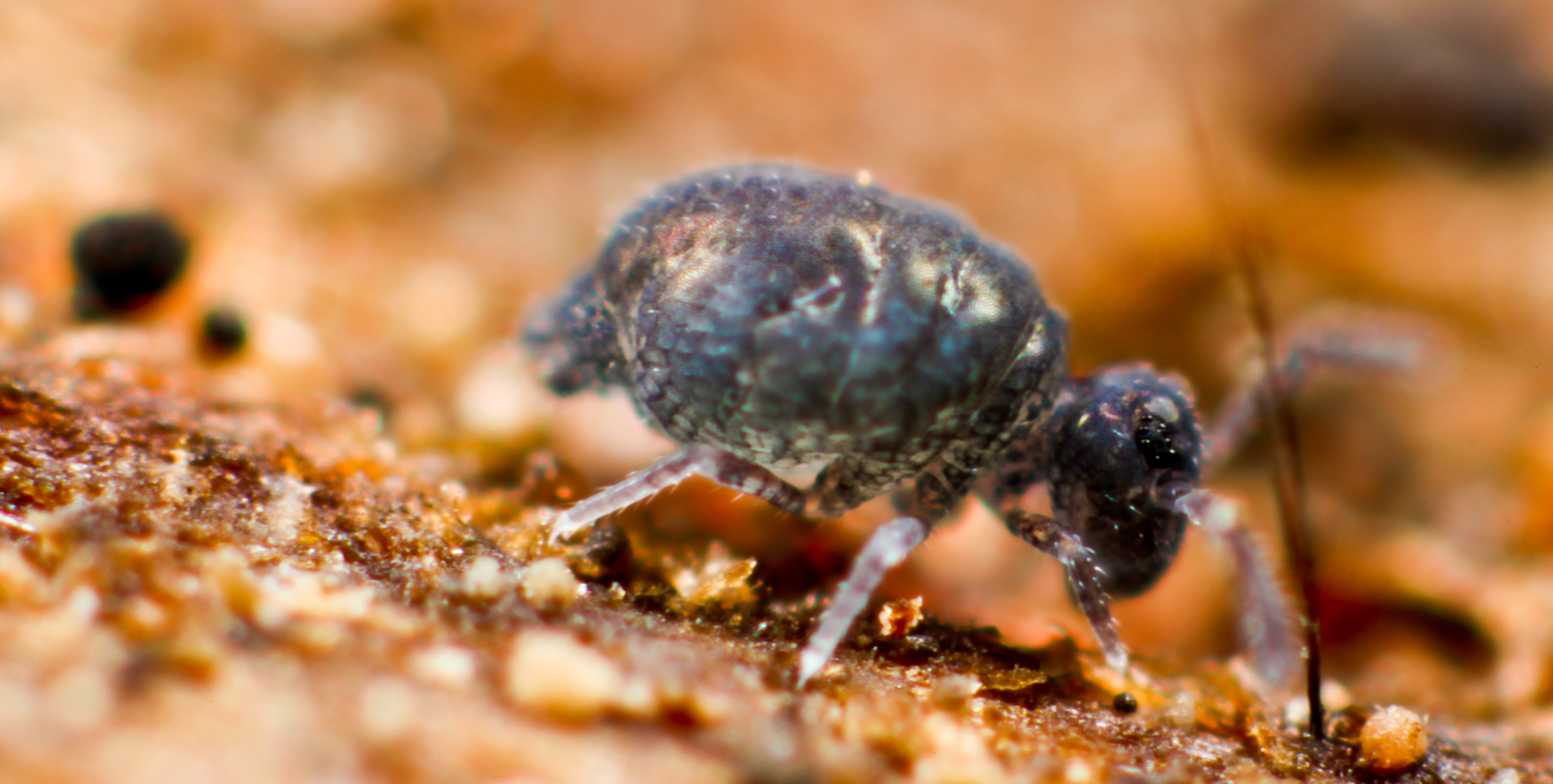
