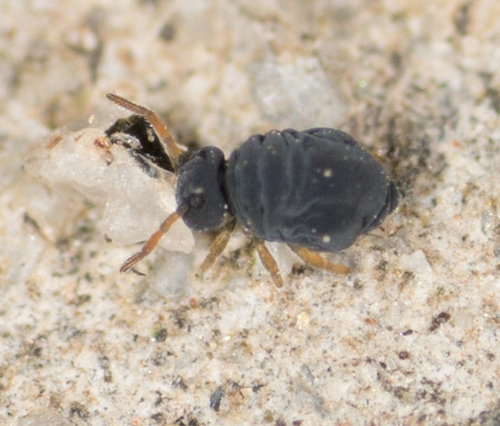

Scientific classification
- Domain: Eukaryota
- Kingdom: Animalia
- Phylum: Arthropoda
- Class: Collembola
- Order: Symphypleona
- Family: Katiannidae
- Genus: Sminthurinus
- Species: S. atrapallidus

Binomial name
- Sminthurinus atrapallidus Snider, 1978

= Sminthurinus atrapallidus =

Species of springtail

Sminthurinus atrapallidus is a species of globular springtail in the family Katiannidae.
