= Sminthurinus distinctus =

Scientific classification
- Domain: Eukaryota
- Kingdom: Animalia
- Phylum: Arthropoda
- Class: Collembola
- Order: Symphypleona
- Family: Katiannidae
- Genus: Sminthurinus
- Species: S. distinctus

Binomial name
- Sminthurinus distinctus Kang J-S & Lee B-H, 2005

Species of springtail

Sminthurinus distinctus is a springtail in the family Katiannidae, and was first described in 2005 by Kang Jin-sun, Lee Byung-hoon and Park Kyung-Hwa.

Its body length is approximately 1.0 mm and the body is usually light yellow, with black patterning along the sides.

It is endemic to South Korea, where it is found in the provinces of Gyeongsangbuk-do and Jeollabuk-do in forest leaf litter.
