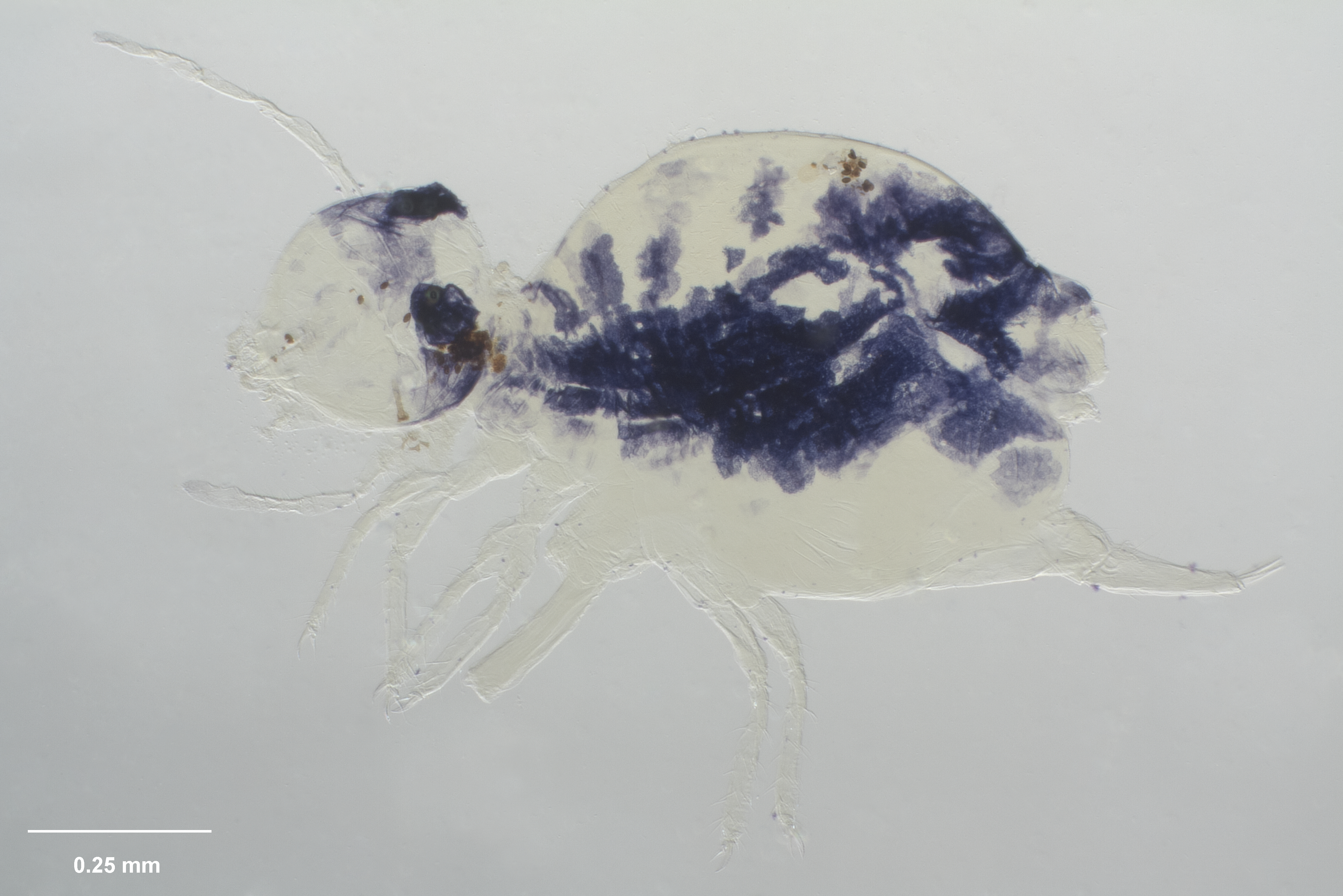
- Type specimen of Parakatianna salmoni from the collections of Te Papa

Scientific classification
- Domain: Eukaryota
- Kingdom: Animalia
- Phylum: Arthropoda
- Class: Collembola
- Order: Symphypleona
- Family: Katiannidae
- Genus: Parakatianna
- Species: P. salmoni

Binomial name
- Parakatianna salmoni (Wise, 1964)

Synonyms
- Longkingia salmoni Wise, 1964

= Parakatianna salmoni =

Species of springtail

Parakatianna salmoni is a species of springtail belonging to the family Katiannidae. The species was first described by Keith Arthur John Wise in 1964. The species is native to Campbell Island in the New Zealand Subantarctic Islands.

== Taxonomy ==
The species was first described as Longkingia salmoni in 1964 by Keith Arthur John Wise, who named this after J. T. Salmon, who first discovered the species. The species has since been placed within the genus Parakatianna.

== Description ==
Parakatianna salmoni is dark green and colourless when preserved in alcohol. The species grows up to 1.2 mm (0.047 in) in length, and has antennae that are twice as long as its head.

== Distribution ==
The species is known to commonly occur in the Campbell Islands, typically found in aerial portions of vegetation such as tussock.
