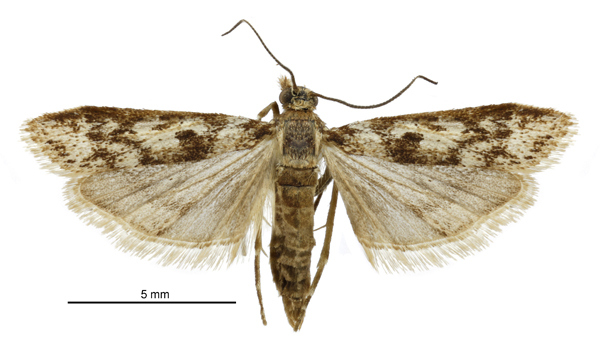
- Male

Scientific classification
- Kingdom: Animalia
- Phylum: Arthropoda
- Class: Insecta
- Order: Lepidoptera
- Family: Crambidae
- Genus: Eudonia
- Species: E. albafascicula

Binomial name
- Eudonia albafascicula (Salmon in Salmon and Bradley, 1956)

Synonyms
- Scoparia albafascicula Salmon in Salmon and Bradley, 1956

= Eudonia albafascicula =

Species of moth

Eudonia albafascicula is a moth of the family Crambidae. It was described by John Salmon in 1956. It is endemic to New Zealand, and can be found on Antipodes Island.
