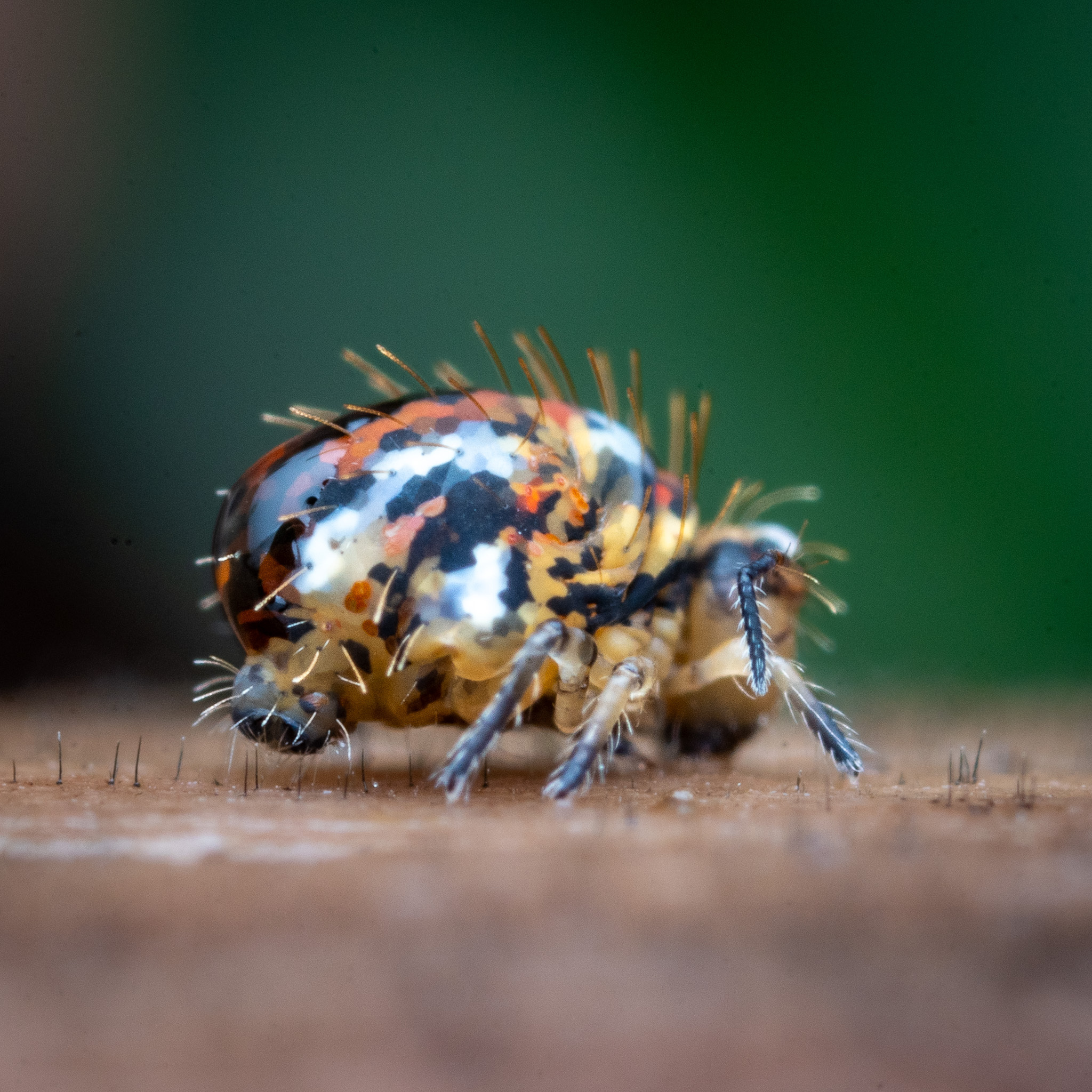

Scientific classification
- Domain: Eukaryota
- Kingdom: Animalia
- Phylum: Arthropoda
- Class: Collembola
- Order: Symphypleona
- Family: Katiannidae
- Genus: Vesicephalus
- Species: V. occidentalis

Binomial name
- Vesicephalus occidentalis (Mills, 1935)

= Vesicephalus occidentalis =

Species of springtail

Vesicephalus occidentalis is a species of globular springtail in the family Katiannidae.
