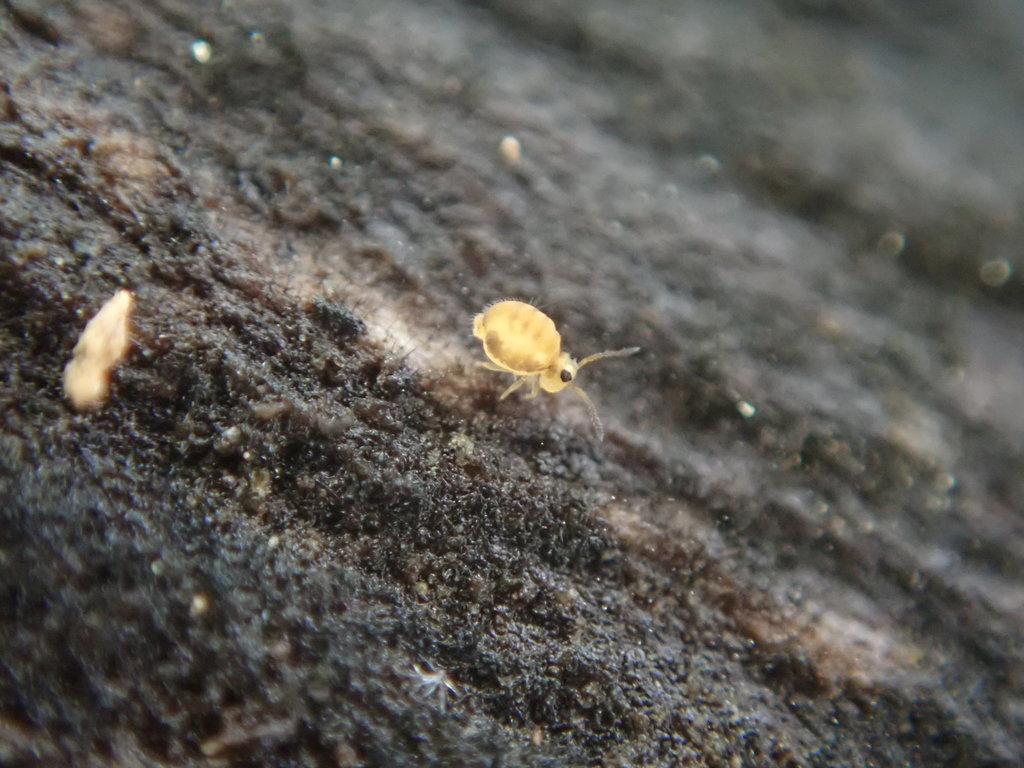

Scientific classification
- Domain: Eukaryota
- Kingdom: Animalia
- Phylum: Arthropoda
- Class: Collembola
- Order: Symphypleona
- Family: Katiannidae
- Genus: Sminthurinus
- Species: S. henshawi

Binomial name
- Sminthurinus henshawi (Folsom, 1896)

Synonyms
- Smythurus henshawi Folsom, 1896

= Sminthurinus henshawi =

Species of springtail

Sminthurinus henshawi is a species of globular springtail in the family Katiannidae.
