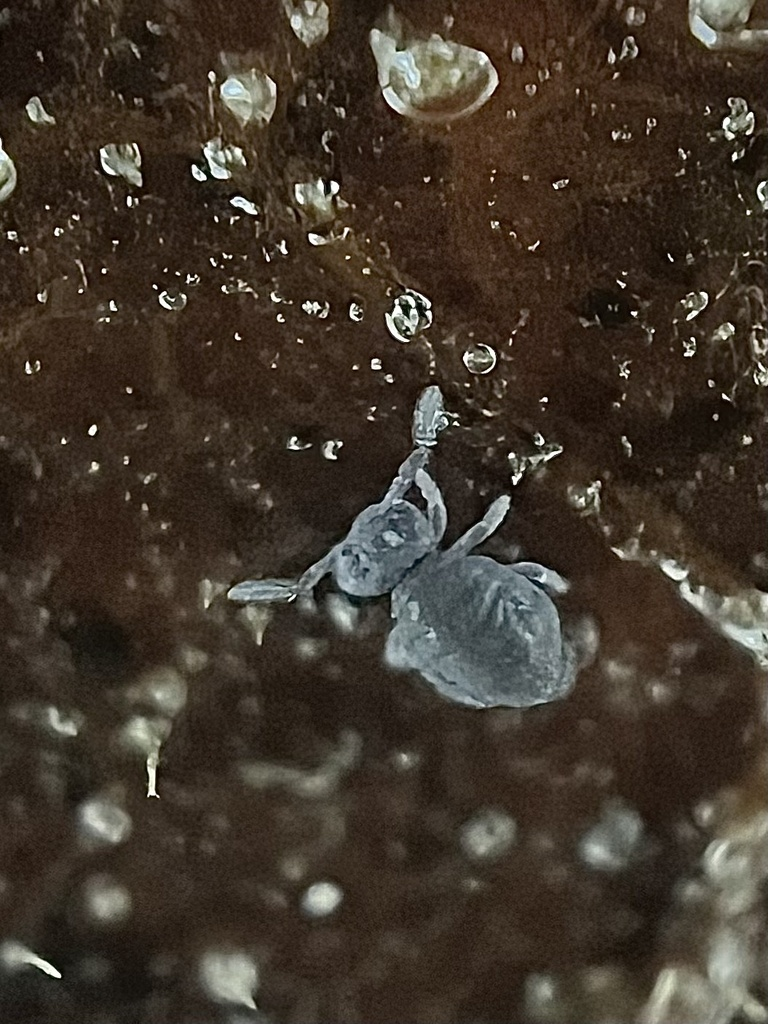

Scientific classification
- Kingdom: Animalia
- Phylum: Arthropoda
- Clade: Pancrustacea
- Class: Collembola
- Order: Symphypleona
- Family: Katiannidae
- Genus: Sminthurinus
- Species: S. lawrencei

Binomial name
- Sminthurinus lawrencei Gisin, 1963

= Sminthurinus lawrencei =

Species of arthropods

Sminthurinus lawrencei is a springtail in the genus Sminthurinus native to Europe. It has naturalized in the Western United States and British Columbia.

This species is black in overall coloration, though juveniles can exhibit a unique blue mottling pattern. These springtails are longer than most species in the Sminthurinus genus, especially towards the back of the abdomen. The humps above the eyes of this species is less prominent than that of similar species.

This species lives in wet moss and leaf litter.
