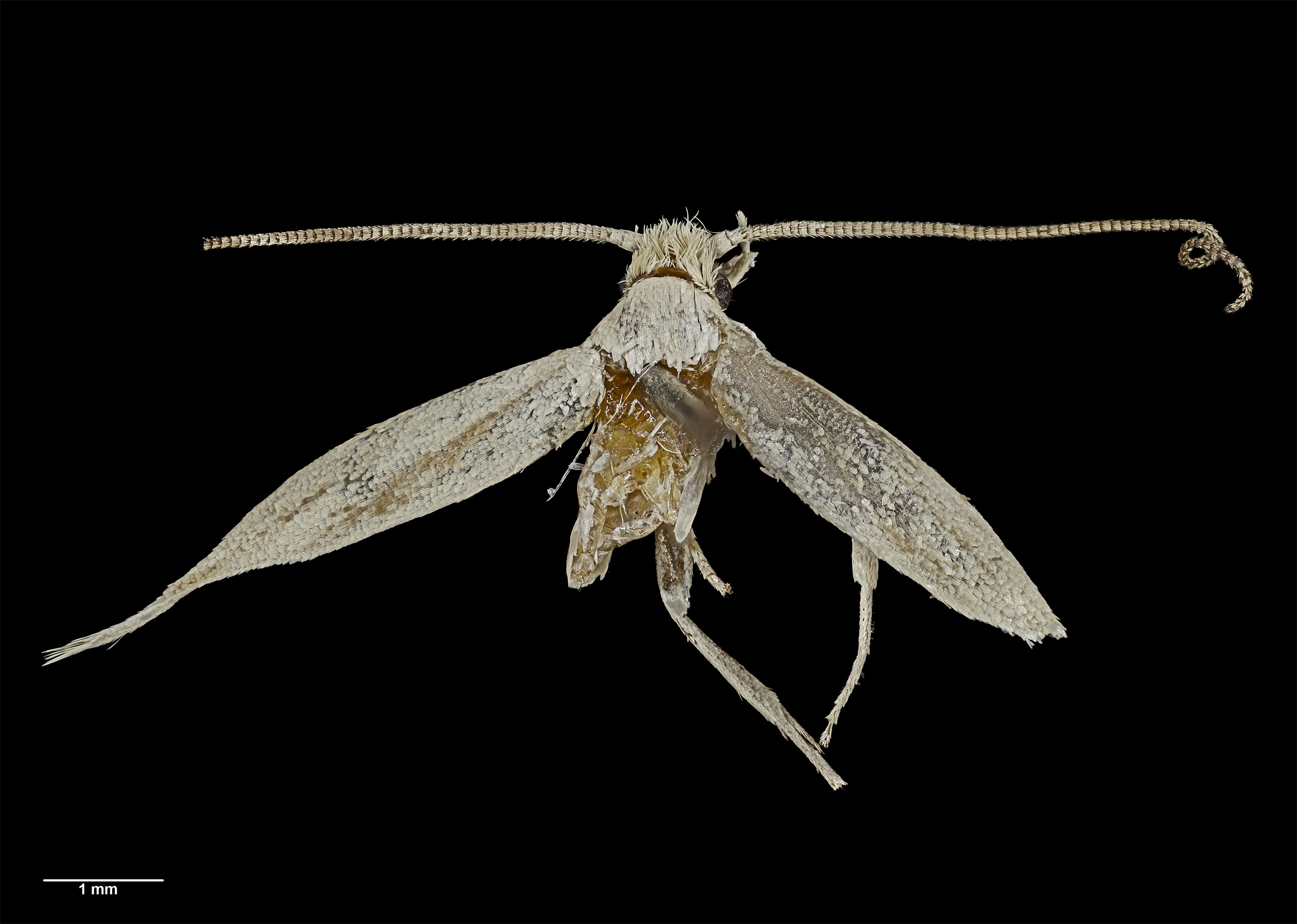
- Dorsal view of male holotype specimen
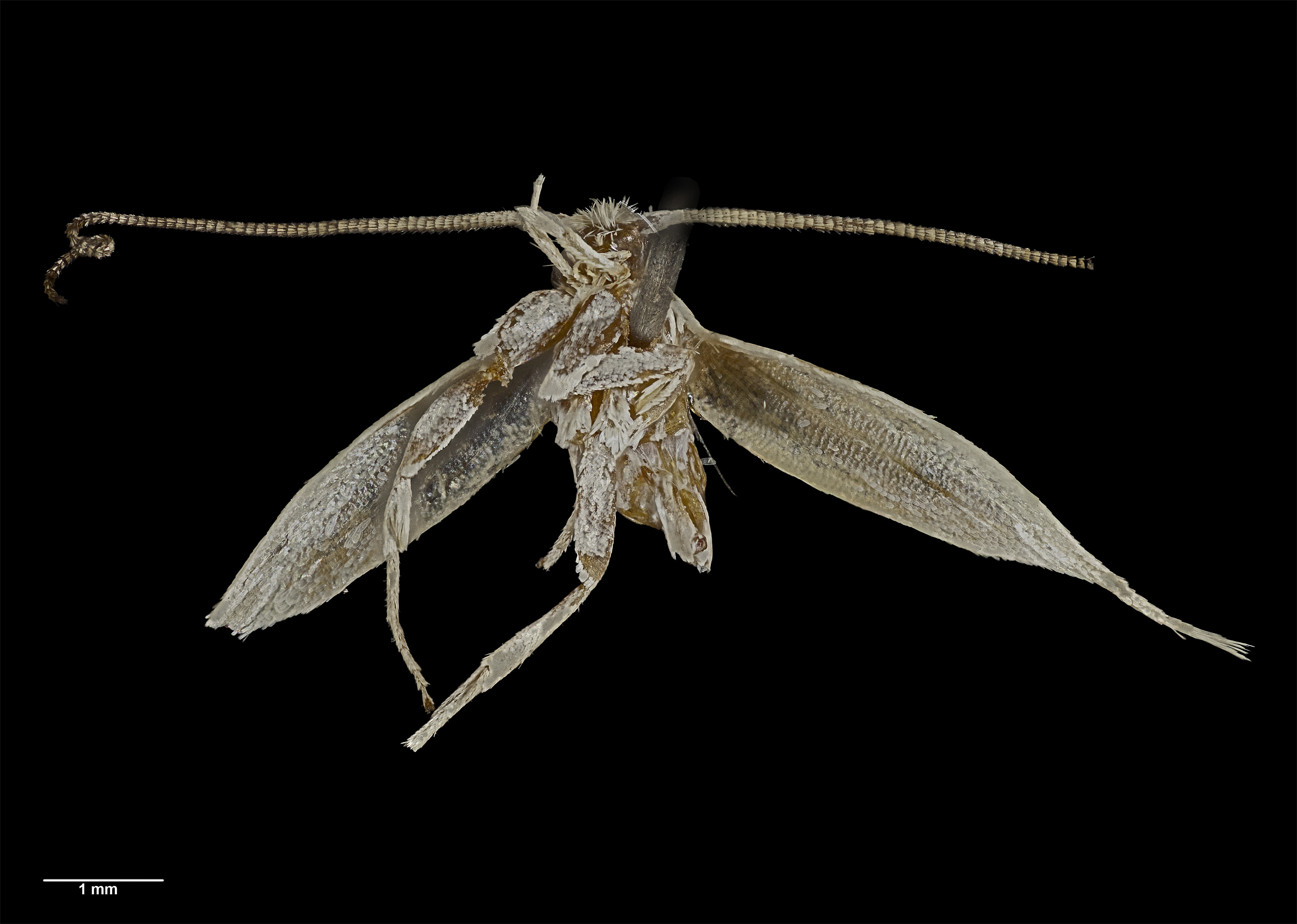
- Ventral view of male holotype specimen

Scientific classification
- Kingdom: Animalia
- Phylum: Arthropoda
- Class: Insecta
- Order: Lepidoptera
- Family: Tineidae
- Genus: Proterodesma
- Species: P. turbotti

Binomial name
- Proterodesma turbotti (Salmon & Bradley, 1956)

Synonyms
- Antipodesma turbottii Salmon & Bradley, 1956

= Proterodesma turbotti =

Species of moth

Proterodesma turbotti is a species of moth in the family Tineidae. It was described by John Salmon & John David Bradley in 1956. This species is endemic to New Zealand, found in the Antipodes Islands and Bounty Islands of the New Zealand Subantarctic Islands.

== Taxonomy ==
The species was identified by Salmon & Bradley in 1956, who named the species Antipodesma turbottii, placing it in a novel genus. The species was named in honour of the director of Auckland Institute and Museum, Graham Turbott, who collected the holotype and paratype specimens from the Antipodes Islands and the Bounty Islands in 1950. In 1971, John S. Dugdale synonymised the genus with Proterodesma due to larvae and genitalia similarities.

== Description ==
The forewings of Proterodesma turbotti measure 12 mm (0.47 in). The insect varies in colour from creamy-white to almost black, often varying in colour based on habitat. Females tend to be larger than males. The species can be differentiated from other Proterodesma by differences in genitalia.

== Distribution and habitat ==
The species is endemic to New Zealand, found in the Antipodes Islands and Bounty Islands. The species lives in dead vegetation, and can commonly be found on coastal rock faces and in upland grassland.
