= Vesicephalus =

Scientific classification
- Domain: Eukaryota
- Kingdom: Animalia
- Phylum: Arthropoda
- Class: Collembola
- Order: Symphypleona
- Family: Katiannidae
- Genus: Vesicephalus; Richards in Delamare Deboutteville & Massoud, 1964

Genus of springtails

Vesicephalus is a genus of globular springtails in the family Katiannidae. There are at least four described species in Vesicephalus.

== Species ==
These four species belong to the genus Vesicephalus:

- Vesicephalus crossleyi Snider, RJ, 1985
- Vesicephalus europaeus Ardanaz & Pozo, 1986
- Vesicephalus longisetis (Guthrie, 1903)
- Vesicephalus occidentalis (Mills, 1935)
