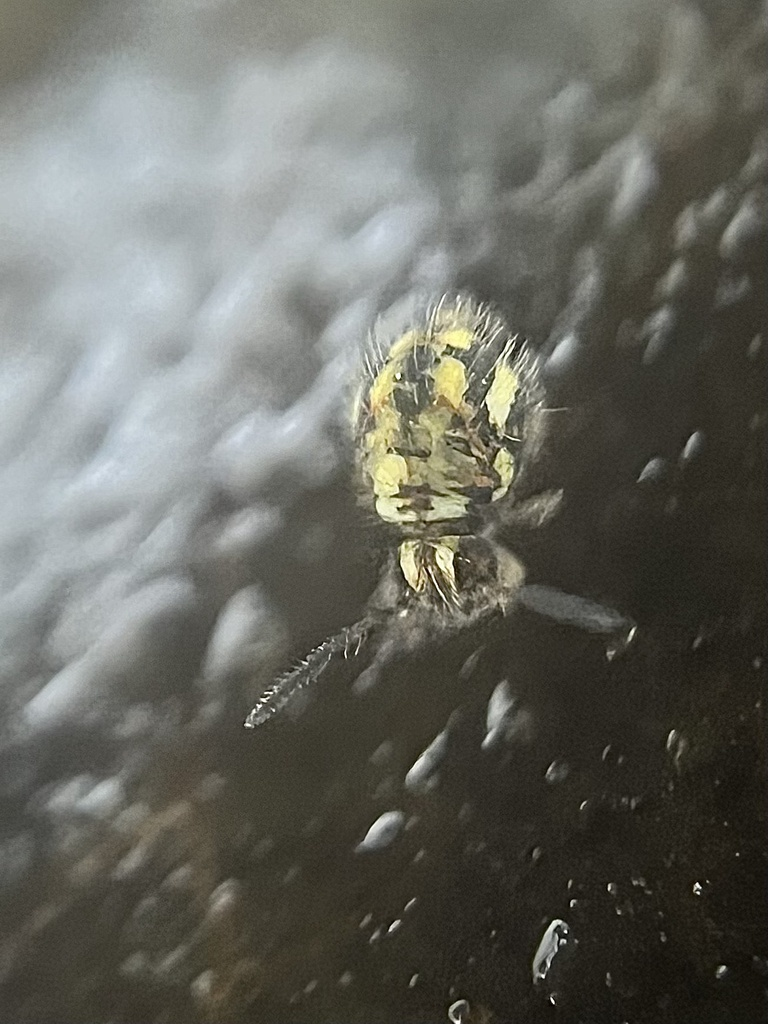
- A "Mtn dew" Katianna found under a leaf in Washington State

Scientific classification
- Kingdom: Animalia
- Phylum: Arthropoda
- Clade: Pancrustacea
- Class: Collembola
- Order: Symphypleona
- Family: Katiannidae
- Tribe: Katiannini
- Genus: Katianna; C.Börner, 1906

= Katianna =

Genus of springtails

Katianna is a genus of springtails with a worldwide distribution.

This genus is characterized by its small structure (usually only about 1 mm) and characteristic hairy antenna and hairs all over the abdomen, especially towards the posterior end.

== Species ==
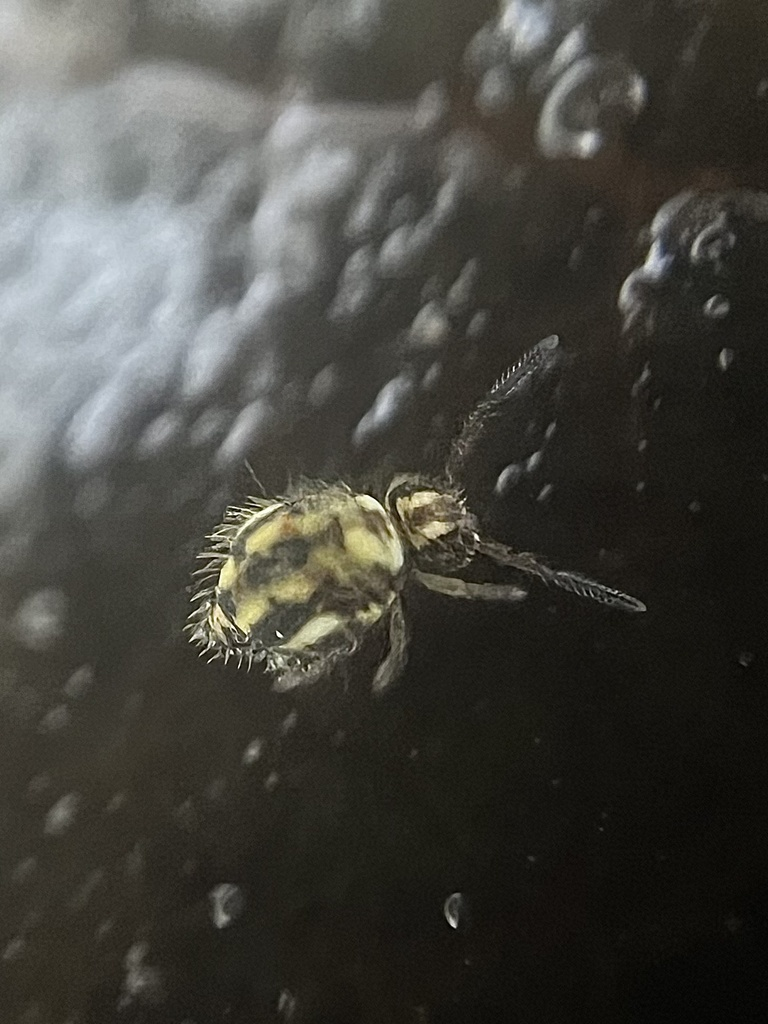
An example of the hairs on the behind characteristic of Katianna species

Described species in the genus Katianna:

- Katianna antennapartitia J. T. Salmon, 1941
- Katianna aurantiaca (H. Womersley, 1935)
- Katianna australis H. Womersley, 1931
- Katianna banzarei J. T. Salmon, 1964
- Katianna cardoni (Delamare Deboutteville & Massoud, 1963)
- Katianna cobold Börner, 1907
- Katianna coeruleocephala Handschin, 1920
- Katianna drummondi (H. Womersley, 1932)
- Katianna gloriosa J. T. Salmon, 1946
- Katianna houssayi Delamare Deboutteville & Massoud, 1963
- Katianna jeanneli Delamare Deboutteville & Massoud, 1963
- Katianna kerguelenensis Denis, 1947
- Katianna kuscheli Delamare Deboutteville & Massoud, 1963
- Katianna liliputana (H. Nicolet, 1847)
- Katianna maryae E. C. Bernard, 2014
- Katianna mnemosyne C. Börner, 1906
- Katianna mucina Womersley, 1933
- Katianna nunezi (Najt, 1967)
- Katianna obscura (H. Womersley, 1936)
- Katianna oceanica H. Schött, 1917
- Katianna ornata H. Womersley, 1932
- Katianna patagonica (C. Delamare Deboutteville & Z. Massoud, 1963)
- Katianna perplexa J. T. Salmon, 1944
- Katianna pescotti H. Womersley, 1935
- Katianna poivrei C. Delamare Deboutteville & Z. Massoud, 1963
- Katianna puella (Denis & J-R, 1933)
- Katianna purpuravirida J. T. Salmon, 1941
- Katianna reducta J. T. Salmon, 1944
- Katianna richardsi Najt, 1967
- Katianna ruberoculata J. T. Salmon, 1944
- Katianna schotti Womersley, 1933
- Katianna serrae Najt, 1967
- Katianna serrata (Schäffer, 1897)
- Katianna steparia Najt, 1967
- Katianna uschuaiensis Schäffer, 1897
- Katianna viretorum Najt, 1967
- Katianna viridis Delamare Deboutteville & Massoud, 1963
- Katianna willincki (C. Delamare Deboutteville & Z. Massoud, 1963)
- Katianna wygodzinskyi Delamare Deboutteville & Massoud, 1963
- Katianna zebra (H. Womersley, 1942)

== Unknown species ==
Recently there have been records of a new unknown species from the Ppacific Northwest since 2016, rediscovered in 2024, that have been turning up, therefore completing the worldwide range map, because that was the one area that the genus had been lacking. They are currently known within the community as Mtn Dew Katianna, or as former springtail enthusiast and founder of collembola. org Franz Janssens coined before his death in 2021, "Katianna species 10".
