= Proterodesma byrsopola =

Scientific classification
- Kingdom: Animalia
- Phylum: Arthropoda
- Clade: Pancrustacea
- Class: Insecta
- Order: Lepidoptera
- Family: Tineidae
- Genus: Proterodesma
- Species: P. byrsopola

Binomial name
- Proterodesma byrsopola Meyrick, 1909

Synonyms
- Tinea mysticopa Meyrick, 1914; Proterodesma mysticopa (Meyrick, 1914)

Species of moth endemic to New Zealand

Proterodesma byrsopola is a species of moth in the family Tineidae. It was first described by Edward Meyrick in 1909. This species is endemic to New Zealand and has been observed in the South Island, Stewart Island, Campbell Island, the Auckland Islands, and the Snares Islands. This species inhabits native forest at altitudes ranging from sea level to subalpine. The larvae feed on dead plant detritus and leaf litter including from species in the genus Olearia. Adults have been observed from August to February. This moth is fully winged in most locations it is present however on Auckland Island the female of the species shows a minor reduction in wing size. Adults can vary considerably in the distinctiveness of their markings.

== Taxonomy ==
This species was first described by Edward Meyrick in 1909 using specimens collected at Carnley Harbour and Norman Inlet on Auckland Island during the Sub-Antarctic Islands Scientific Expedition. In 1914 Meyrick, thinking he was describing a new species, named this moth Tinea mysticopa. George Hudson discussed and illustrated this species in his 1928 book The butterflies and moths of New Zealand. In his 1928 book Hudson also discussed and illustrated this species under the name Proterodesma mysticopa. In 1964 the male and female genitalia of this moth were examined. In 1971 John S. Dugdale synonymised P. mysticopa into P. byrsopola.

P. byrsopola is the type species of Proterodesma by original monotypy. The female lectotype, collected at Carnley Harbour in the Auckland Islands, is held at the Natural History Museum, London.

== Description ==
Illustration of male.

Illustration of female.

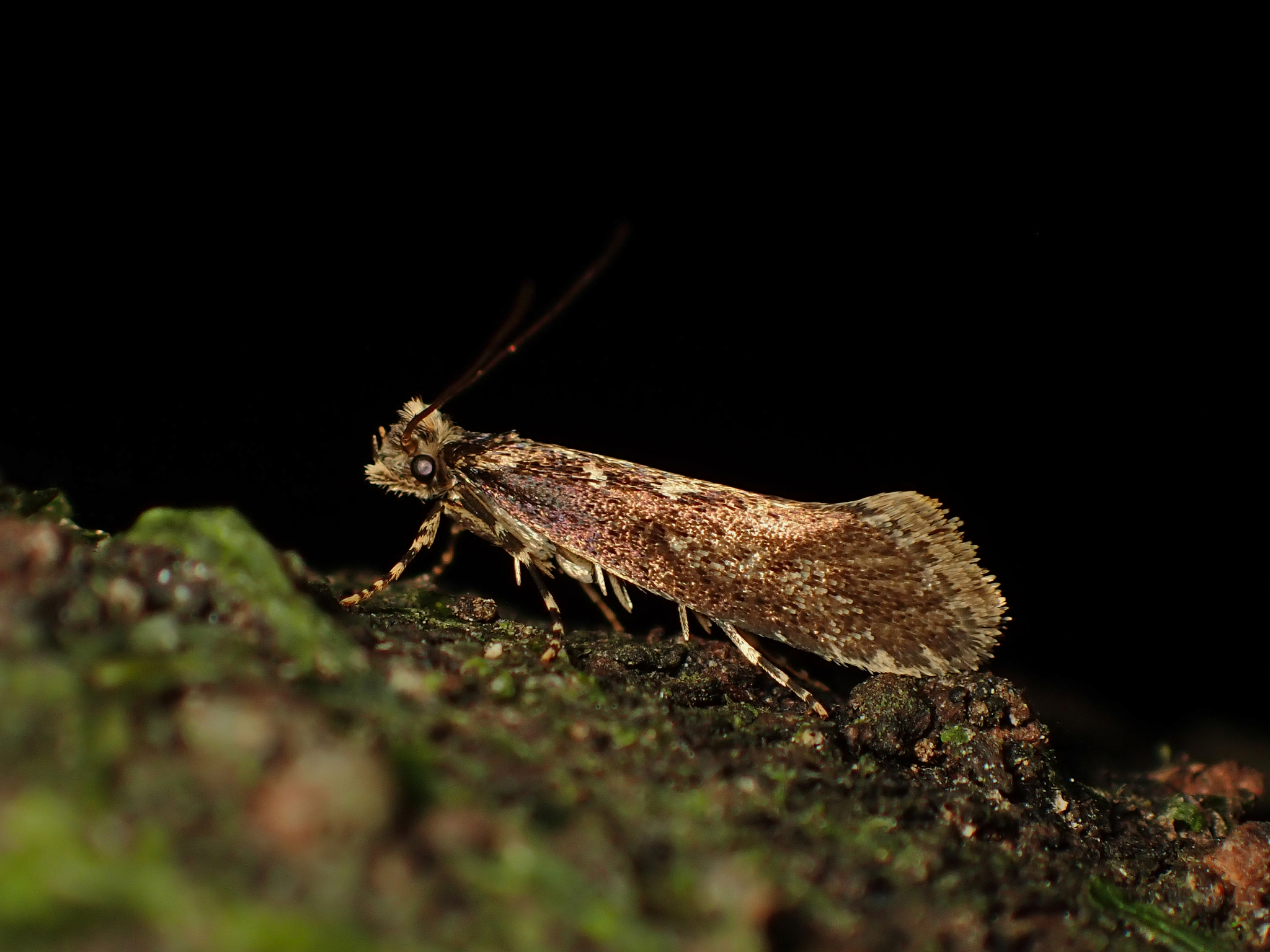
Proterodesma byrsopola 252616745

Meyrick originally described the adult female of the species as follows:

♀. 20-22 mm. Head pale ochreous, with some dark-fuscous hairs. Palpi and antennae pale ochreous. Thorax pale ochreous, shoulders suffused with fuscous. Abdomen pale greyish-ochreous, more or less infuscated. Forewings elongate, rather narrow, costa moderately arched, apex round-pointed, termen extremely obliquely rounded ; whitish-ochreous tinged with brownish and more or less mixed with fuscous ; an undefined blackish streak in disc from before middle to 2/3, appearing to be terminated by indications of pale spots; a strong blackish streak along fold from near base to near tornus, interrupted by two whitish-ochreous spots, second more elongate : cilia whitish-ochreous. Hindwings light purplish-bronzy-grey, paler and tinged with whitish-ochreous towards base, margin towards apex suffused with whitish-ochreous ; cilia whitish-ochreous.

Hudson described the adult male and female as follows:

The expansion of the wings is considerably over 3/4 inch. The fore-wings are elongate-elliptical with the termen very obliquely rounded; ochreous more or less speckled with brown, except on the veins and towards the costa and dorsum; there is a broken black line on the fold; a broad, dark brown longitudinal streak in the disc from the base to about 2/3, thence deflected towards the tornus and an indistinct blackish discal mark. The hind-wings are greyish-ochreous very faintly tinged with purple. In the female the body is very much larger and heavier and the wings relatively narrower and more pointed, the insect thus clearly approaching a semi-apterous condition; the general colouring is darker and duller, the brown speckling being more extensive, and the discal mark darker and more distinct than in the male.

Dugdale was of the opinion that most specimens of this moth is fully winged but that female specimens on Auckland Island show a minor reduction in wing size. Adults vary considerably in the distinctiveness of their markings.

== Distribution ==
This species is endemic to New Zealand and has been observed in the South Island, on Stewart Island, Campbell Island, the Auckland Islands and the Snares Islands.

== Habitat and hosts ==
P. byrsopola frequents native forest in lowland to subalpine habitats. In the Auckland Islands it lives amongst rata forest but in the South Island it has been taken in subalpine habitat at an altitude of 3,000 feet (910 m). The larvae of this species feed on dead plant wood, bark and leaf litter including debris sourced from species in the genus Olearia.

== Behaviour ==
Adults have been observed from August to February. The moth has been seen resting on the undersurface of logs lying on the ground.

== Predators ==
This species has been shown to be predated upon by the Snares fernbird.
