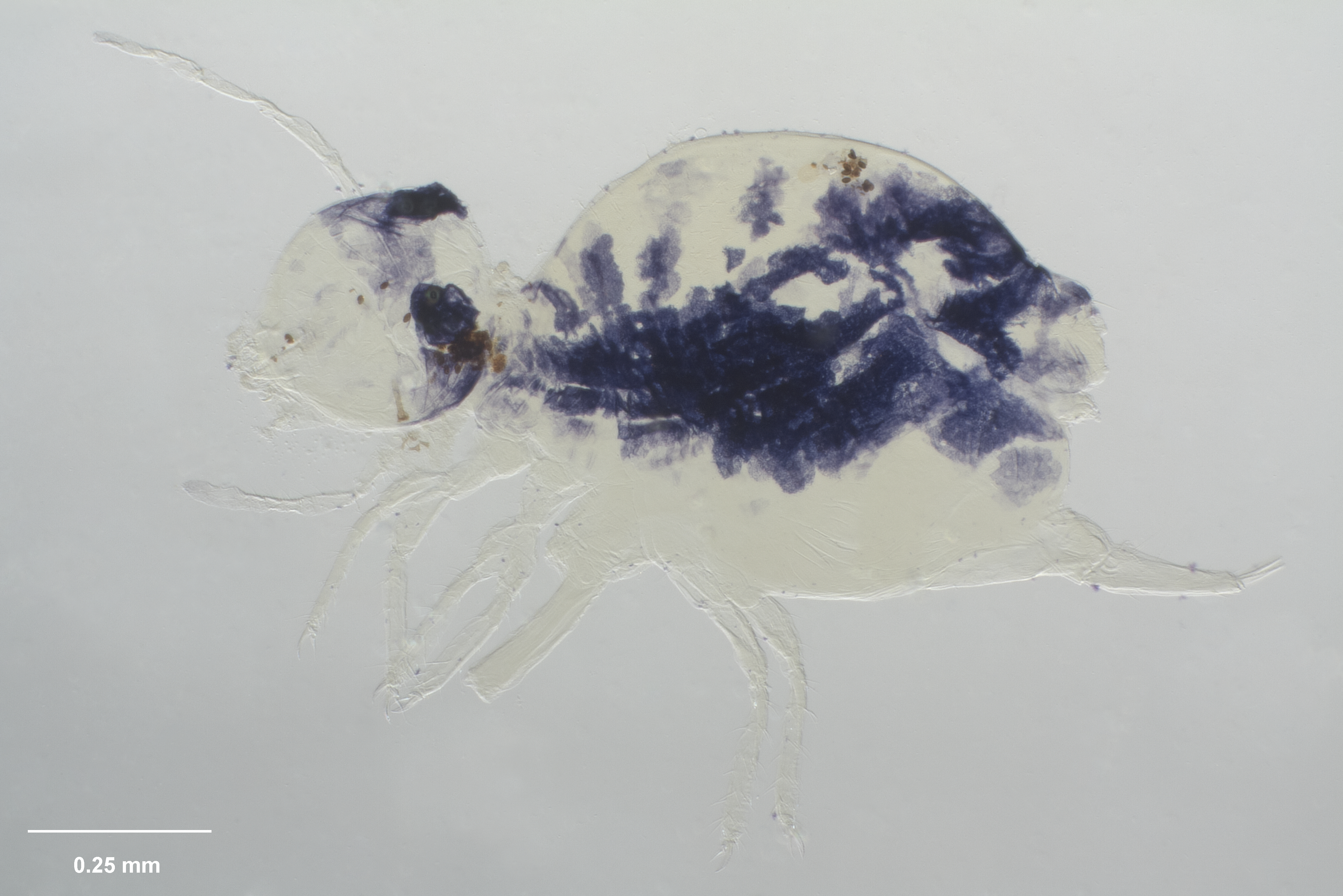
- Parakatianna salmoni

Scientific classification
- Domain: Eukaryota
- Kingdom: Animalia
- Phylum: Arthropoda
- Class: Collembola
- Order: Symphypleona
- Family: Katiannidae
- Genus: Parakatianna; H.Womersley, 1932

= Parakatianna =

Genus of springtails

Parakatianna is a genus of springtails in the family Katiannidae. The genus was identified by Herbert Womersley in 1932.

== Distribution ==
The genus is primarily found in Australia, New Zealand, and on Campbell Island in the New Zealand Subantarctic Islands.

== Species ==
- Parakatianna albirubrafrons J.T.Salmon, 1943
- Parakatianna anomala Womersley, 1933
- Parakatianna cortica J.T.Salmon, 1943
- Parakatianna diversitata J.T.Salmon, 1943
- Parakatianna hexagona J.T.Salmon, 1941
- Parakatianna homerica (J.T.Salmon, 1946)
- Parakatianna prospina (J.T.Salmon, 1946)
- Parakatianna salmoni Wise, 1964
- Parakatianna spinata H.Womersley, 1932
- Parakatianna superba (J.T.Salmon, 1946)
