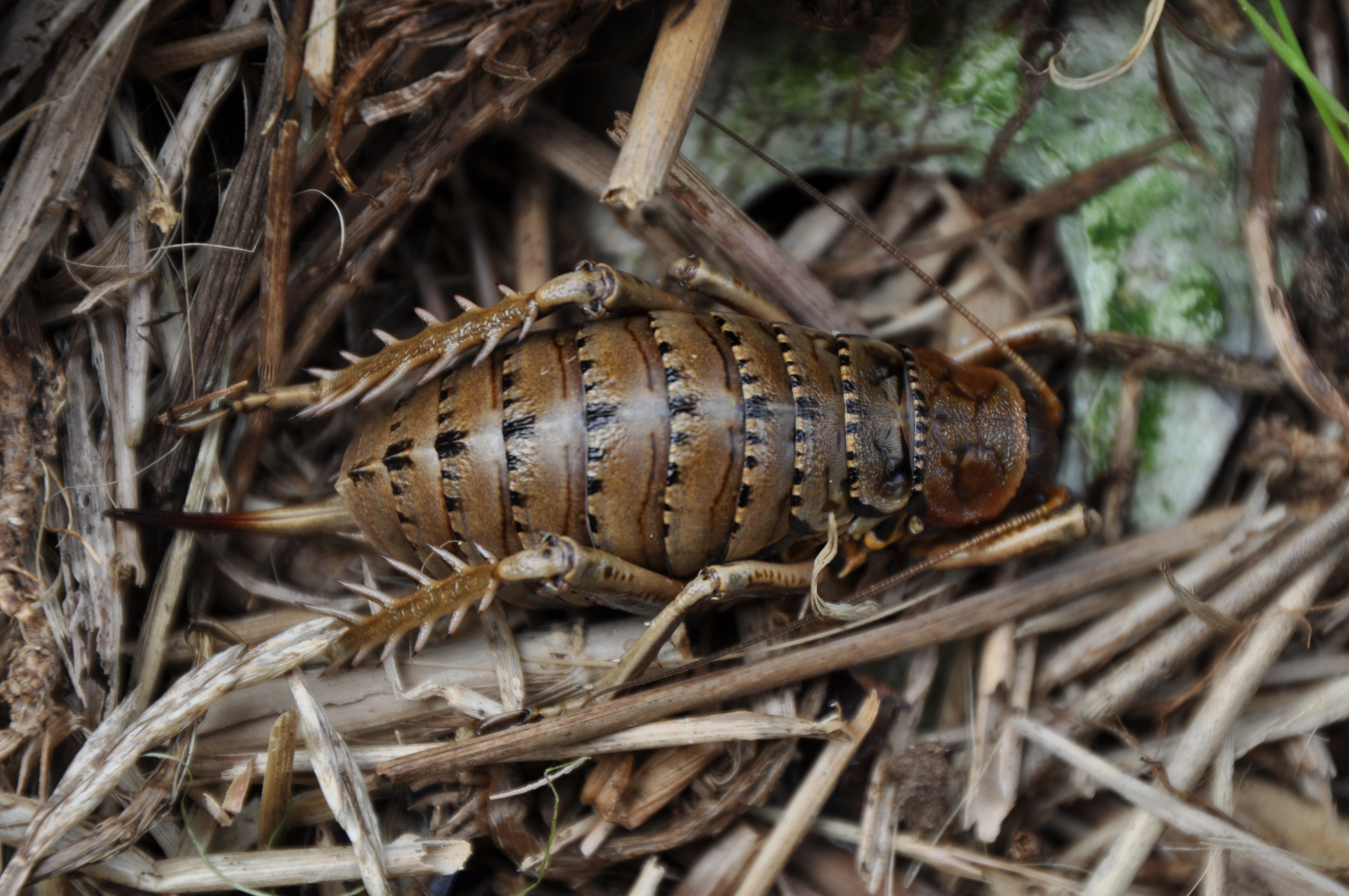

Conservation status
- Nationally Endangered (NZ TCS)

Scientific classification
- Kingdom: Animalia
- Phylum: Arthropoda
- Class: Insecta
- Order: Orthoptera
- Suborder: Ensifera
- Family: Anostostomatidae
- Genus: Deinacrida
- Species: D. carinata

Binomial name
- Deinacrida carinata Salmon, 1950
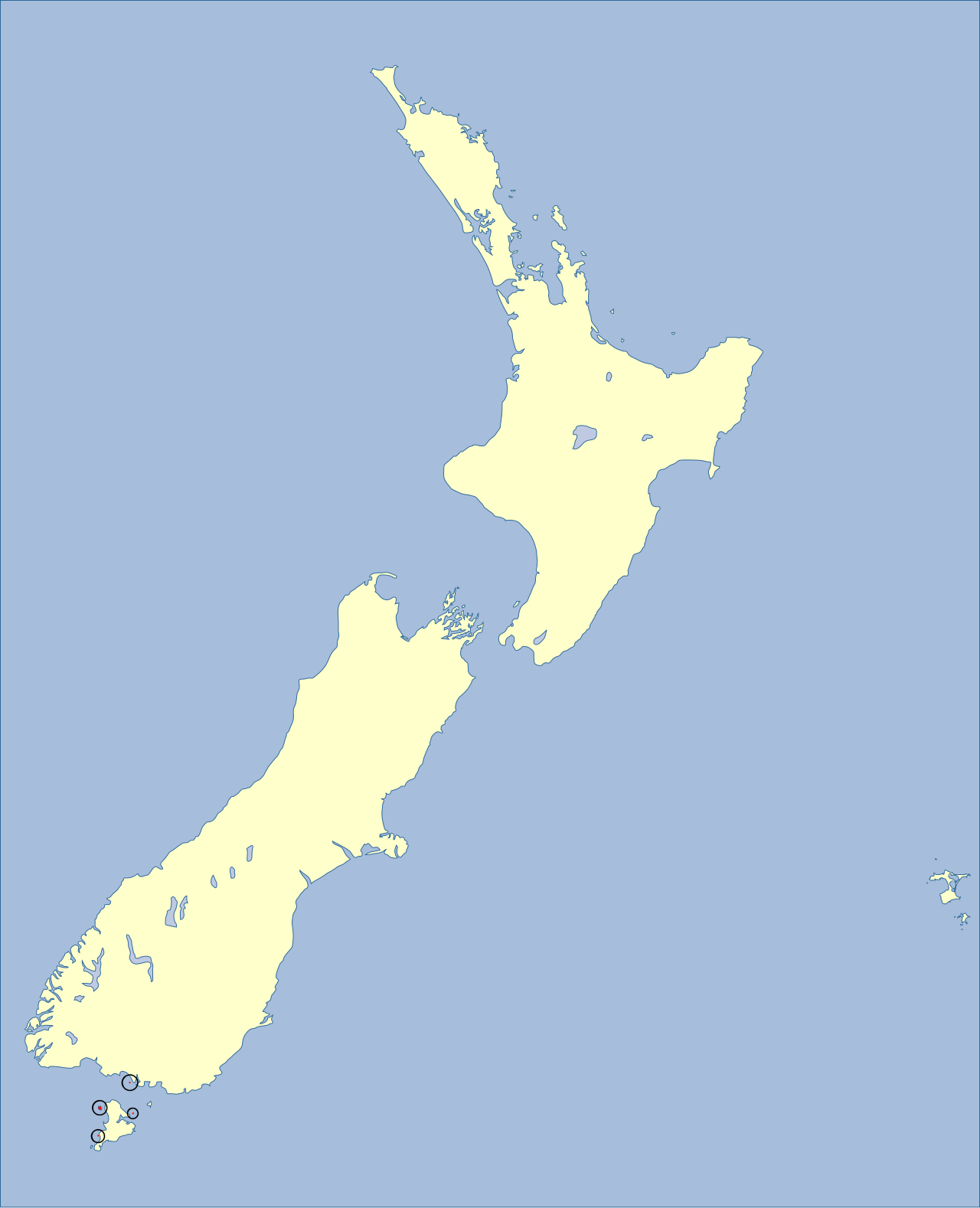

= Deinacrida carinata =

Foveaux Strait giant wētā

Species of orthopteran insect

Deinacrida carinata, also known as the Herekopare wētā or Foveaux wētā, is one of the smallest of the 11 species of giant wētā that belong to the genus Deinacrida, and is a member of the family Anostostomatidae. It is endemic to New Zealand and is currently restricted to a few offshore predator-free islands: Herekopare Island, Kundy Island, Tihaka / Pig Island and Whenua Hou / Codfish Island. D.carinata is a protected species and is nationally endangered.

== Description ==
Deinacrida carinata is the smallest species of giant wētā, with a body length of around 25-40mm. Furthermore, this species displays sexual dimorphism, with adult females being larger and weighing around 6g, whereas males typically weigh around 2g. This species is a dull brown colour which helps with its camouflage to avoid being detected by predators. In addition, D. carinata have prominent spines on their tibia, which they use as a form of defence against their attackers.

== Taxonomy ==
Deinacrida carinata was described from specimens collected by Major R.A. Wilson on Herekopare Island in 1929. However, this species was formally described by John Salmon in 1950. Salmon around that time also developed a key for identifying tree and ground wētā. Accordingly, D.carinata can be distinguished from other wētā by its size, upper femur (which lack spines), and 'notched' markings on the pronotum. In addition, phylogenetic analysis placed D.carinata in a monophyletic clade along with the sub-alpine sister species Deinacrida tibiospina, which is its closest living relative.

== Biology ==
Little is known about the biology of this species however, like most other wētā species D. carinata is nocturnal, spending most of its time during the day sheltering under rocks and logs and coming out to feed at night. They are predominantly herbivorous and feed on a variety of leaves, flowers, fruits, lichens and grasses, but will occasionally eat other invertebrates.

== Distribution and habitat ==
Deinacrida carinata is the most southern species of giant wētā. The species occurs only on offshore predator-free islands - Herekopare Island, Kundy Island and Tihaka/Pig Island. In 2009 this species was translocated to Whenua Hou/Codfish Island. It is thought that D. carinata was once more widespread and its current distribution suggests a relict pattern. However, there are no records of D.carinata ever having existed on the mainland. D. carinata is predominantly ground-dwelling, although it is most likely semi-arboreal. It can be found inhabiting areas such as grasslands, low-growing shrubs, clearings and forest margins. In past survey's D. carinata has been observed in native woody shrub species on Herekopare island, and has been recorded persisting amongst cocksfoot (Dactylis glomerata), Californian thistle (Cirsium arvense), southern nettle (Urtica australis) cabbage tree (Cordyline australis), Carex sedge and harakeke/flax (Phormium tenax).

== Threats ==
Since the introduction of mammalian predators many of New Zealand's endemic fauna have been severely impacted, and D.carinata is no exception. It has been identified in the past that cats, rodents and weka are the main reasons for the decline of this species in its current distribution. On Herekopare, Kundy and Whenua Hou/Codfish Island weka, cats and rodents have been removed. However, weka have subsequently been reintroduced to Herekopare Island by muttonbirders and currently still pose a threat to D. carinata. In addition, weka are also present on Tihaka/Pig Island where their colony have been protected since 1965. Furthermore, previous surveys conducted by the Wildlife Service reveal the extent to how much cats were impacting D.carinata on Herekopare Island. When analyzing the stomach contents of cats wētā remains were found in 14 individuals, of which 7 contained more than 10 wētā, and 2 contained more than 100. Subsequently, a decision was made by the Wildlife Service in 1970 to eradicate cats from the island as they were also impacting on birdlife. Native lizards have also been noted as being probable natural predators such as small-eared skinks (Oligosoma stenotis) and Raukawa gecko (Hoplodactylus maculatus), which both have been observed during past surveys for D.carinata on Tihaka/Pig Island.

== Conservation ==
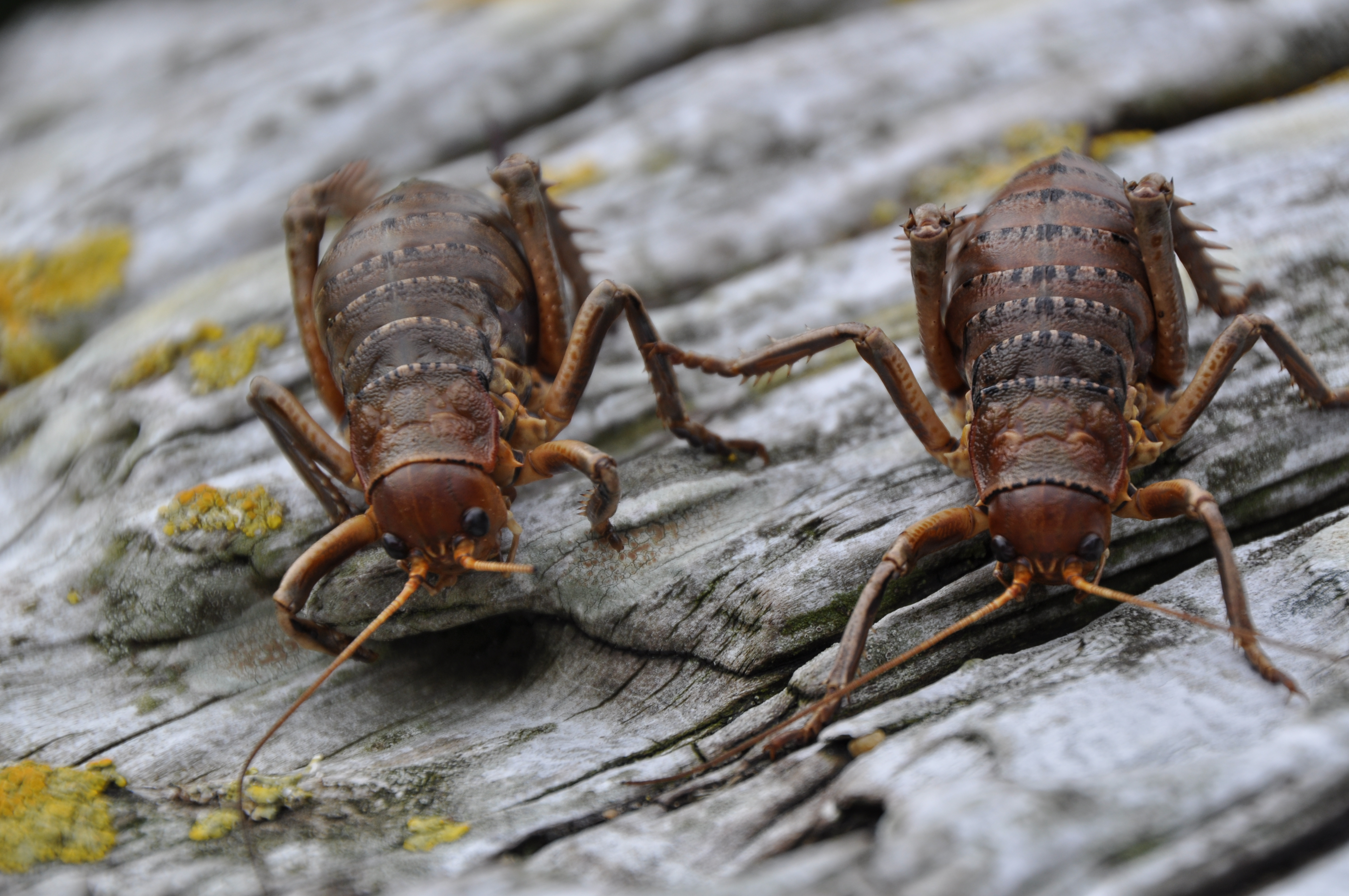
Giant wētā found on Tihaka/Pig Island during a 2011 survey. Photo:Ros Cole, DOC.

Deinacrida carinata is protected under the Seventh Schedule of the New Zealand Wildlife Act 1953. In addition, D. carinata's IUCN category is listed as NE (Not Evaluated) and as a category C (Nationally Endangered) species under the New Zealand threat classification system. The New Zealand Department of Conservation (DOC) have acknowledged D. carinata is a species of which "little is known" in the Threatened Weta recovery plan (1998), and only a few surveys have been conducted in the past. The DOC have also bred D. carinata in captivity. In 2009, DOC translocated 34 Herekopare wētā from Tihaka/Pig Island to Whenua Hou/Codfish Island. Eradication of pests where D. carinata is distributed has been undertaken by DoC who also routinely monitor predator re-invasions on Whenua Hou/Codfish, Herekopare and Kundy Island, as well as also being involved in planning for restoration planting on Tihaka/Pig and Kundy Islands.
