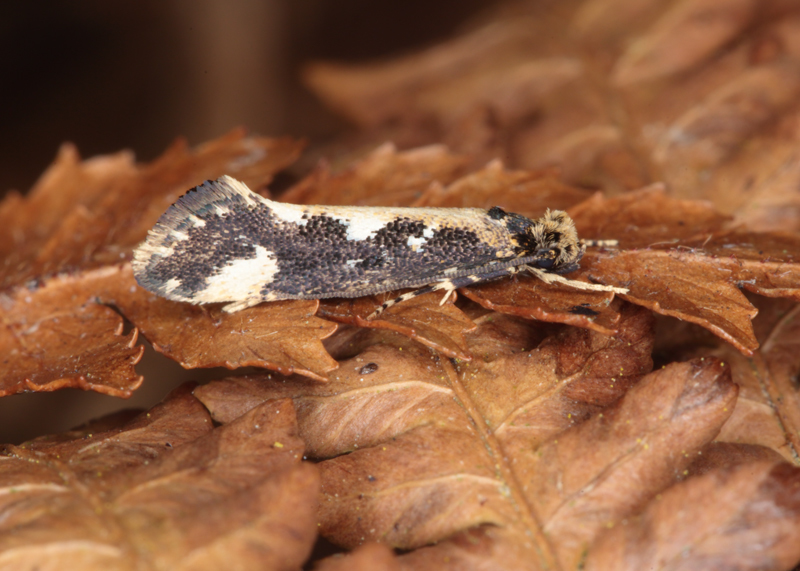
- Proterodesma chathamica seen in the Chatham Islands

Scientific classification
- Kingdom: Animalia
- Phylum: Arthropoda
- Class: Insecta
- Order: Lepidoptera
- Family: Tineidae
- Genus: Proterodesma
- Species: P. chathamica

Binomial name
- Proterodesma chathamica Dugdale, 1971

= Proterodesma chathamica =

Species of moth

Proterodesma chathamica is a species of moth in the family Tineidae. It was described by John S. Dugdale in 1971. This species is endemic to New Zealand.
