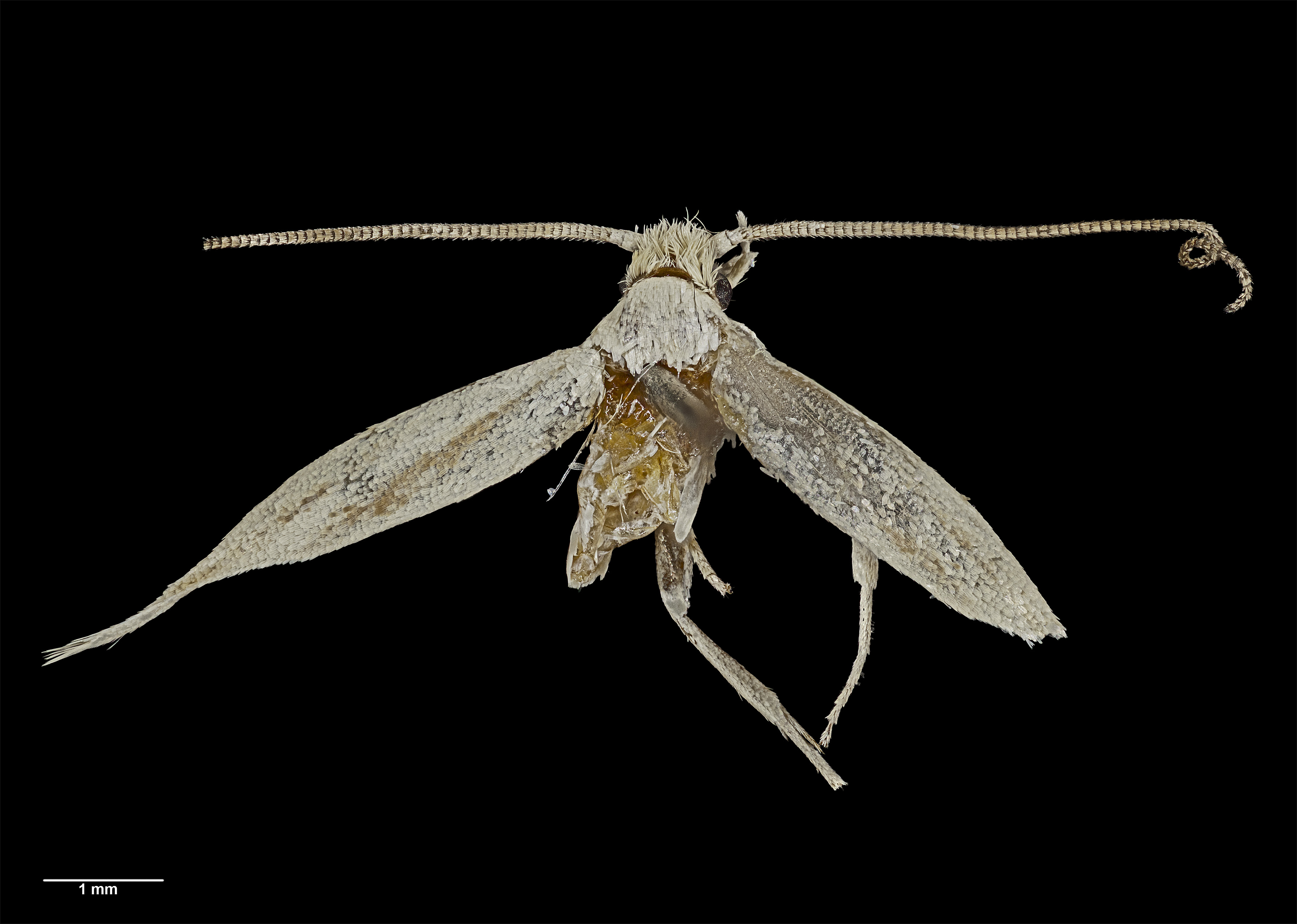
- Proterodesma turbotti

Scientific classification
- Kingdom: Animalia
- Phylum: Arthropoda
- Clade: Pancrustacea
- Class: Insecta
- Order: Lepidoptera
- Family: Tineidae
- Subfamily: Tineinae
- Genus: Proterodesma; Meyrick, 1909

= Proterodesma =

Genus of moths

Proterodesma is a genus of moths belonging to the family Tineidae. All the species in this genus are endemic to New Zealand.

== Species ==
- Proterodesma byrsopola Meyrick, 1909
- Proterodesma chathamica Dugdale, 1971
- Proterodesma turbotti (Salmon & Bradley, 1956)
