= Aratiatia Rapids =

River rapids in New Zealand

Coordinates: 38°37′03″S 176°08′20″E

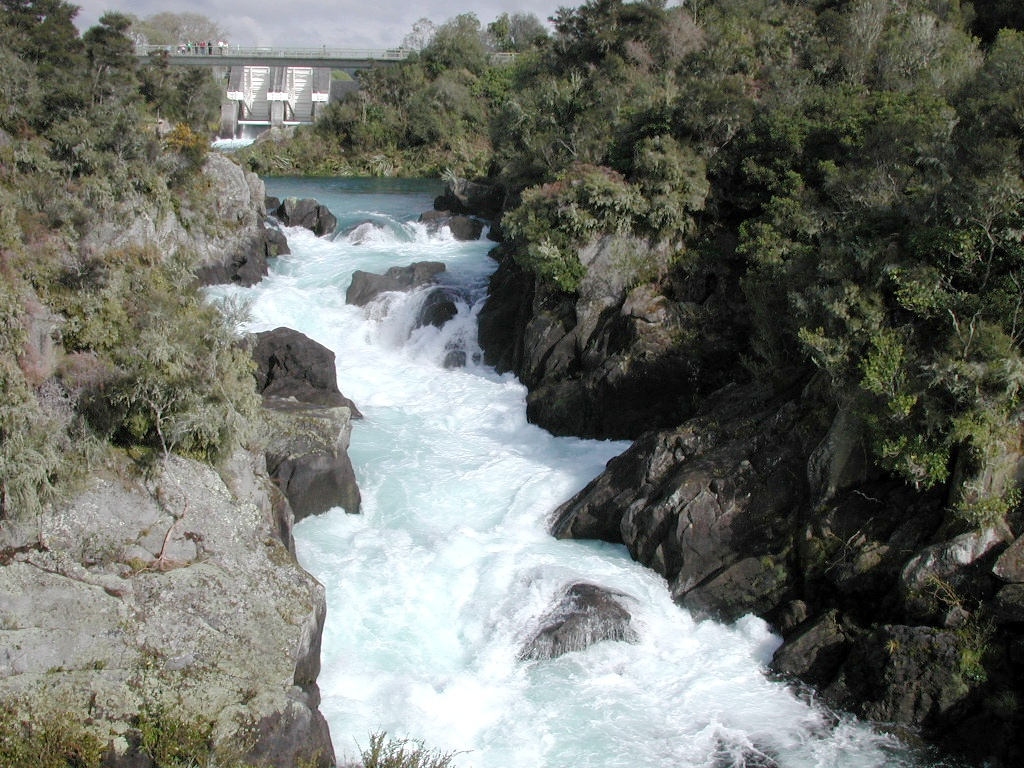
Aratiatia Rapids with open spill gates

The Aratiatia Rapids are an area of New Zealand river rapids downstream from the dam for the Aratiatia Power Station on the Waikato River. The rapids are extremely dangerous.

Before construction of the dam and hydro station, the Aratiatia Rapids were a prominent feature on the Waikato River, and became a scenic reserve in 1906. The dam construction meant that no water flowed over the rapids. However, several times a day, the Aratiatia dam gates are opened, which restores the rapids to their normal operation.

There are three lookout points to watch the Dam release into the rapids, watching the release is a popular tourist attraction.

In Māori, aratiatia means "stairway" or "ladder", possibly referring to the zigzag shape of the rapids, or possibly referring to the path (ara) of Tia, an explorer who travelled up the rapids against the current.
