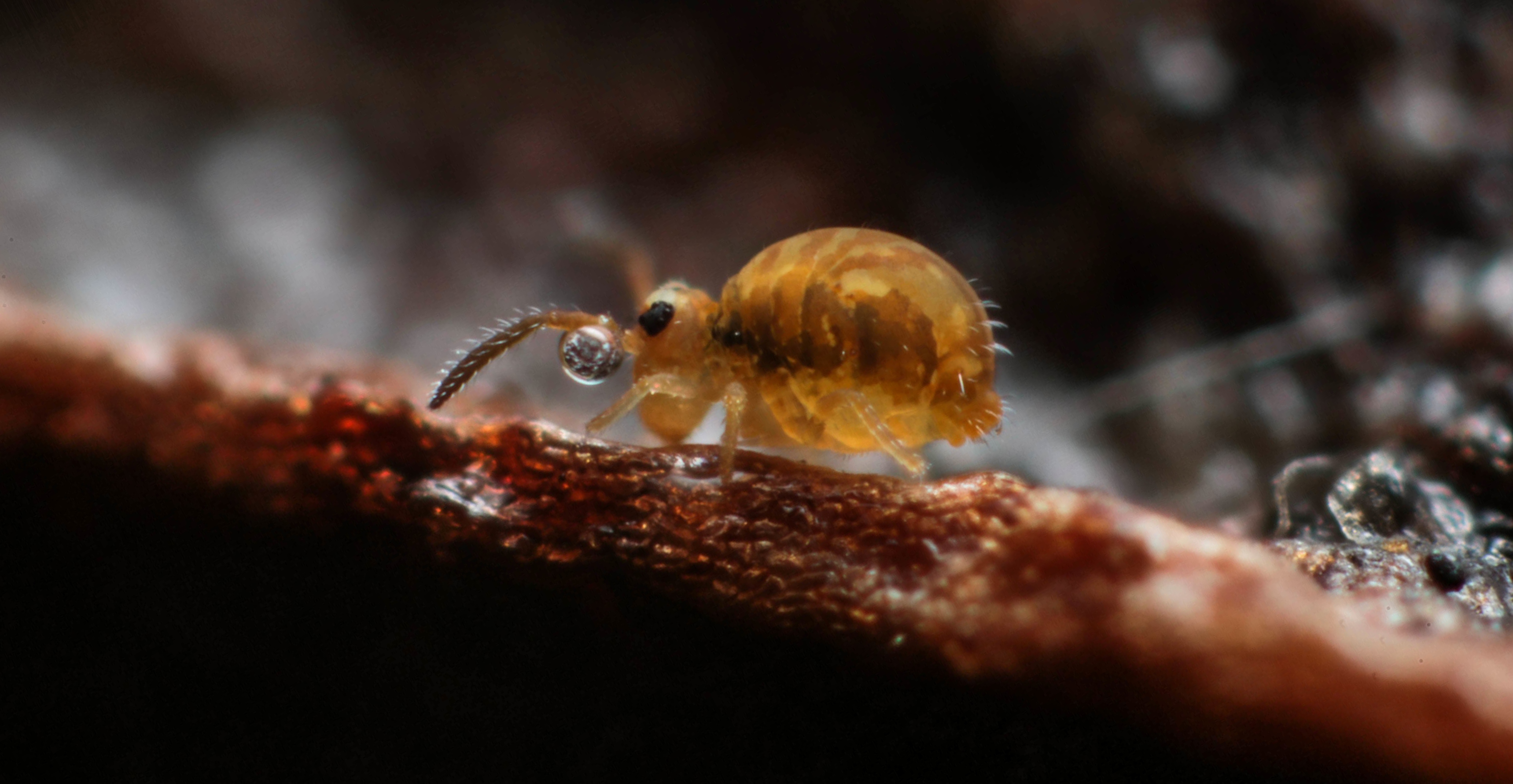

Scientific classification
- Kingdom: Animalia
- Phylum: Arthropoda
- Clade: Pancrustacea
- Class: Collembola
- Order: Symphypleona
- Family: Katiannidae
- Genus: Sminthurinus
- Species: S. aureus

Binomial name
- Sminthurinus aureus Lubbock, 1836)

= Sminthurinus aureus =

Species of springtail

Sminthurinus aureus is a springtail of the family Katiannidae.
