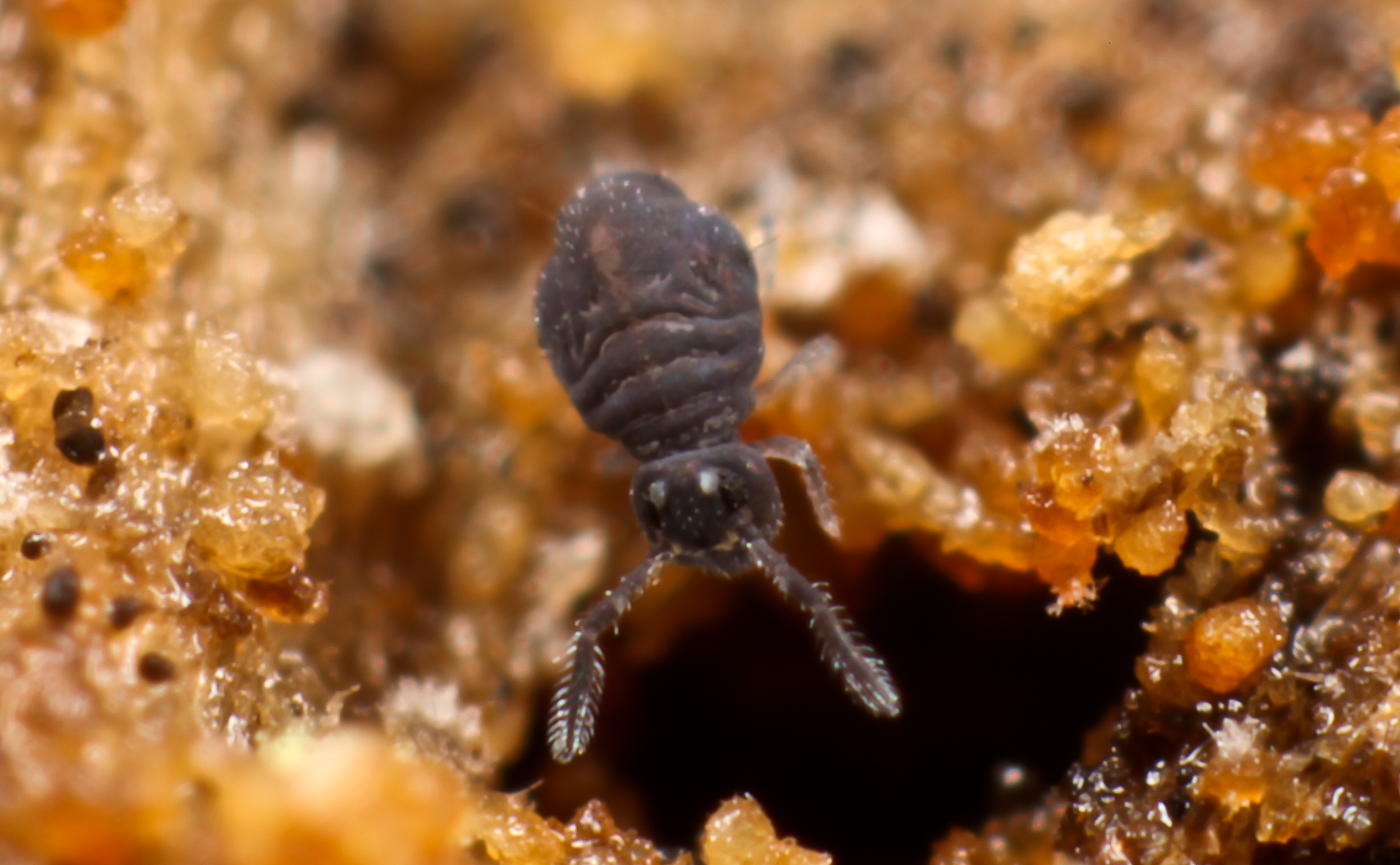
- Sminthurinus niger

Scientific classification
- Kingdom: Animalia
- Phylum: Arthropoda
- Clade: Pancrustacea
- Class: Collembola
- Order: Symphypleona
- Family: Katiannidae
- Genus: Sminthurinus; Börner, 1901

= Sminthurinus =

Genus of springtails

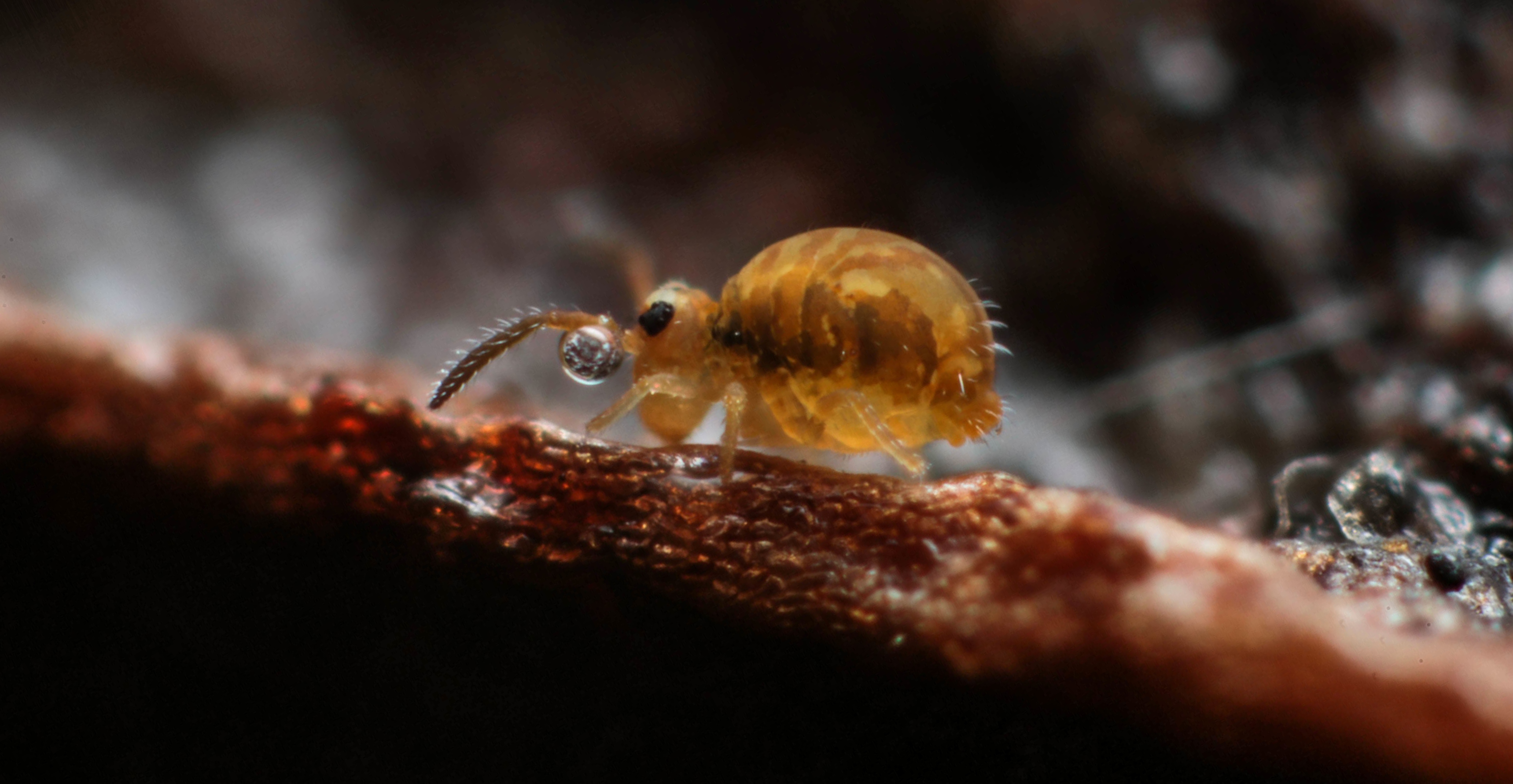
Sminthurinus aureus

Sminthurinus is a genus of springtails and allies in the family Katiannidae. There are about 90 described species in Sminthurinus.

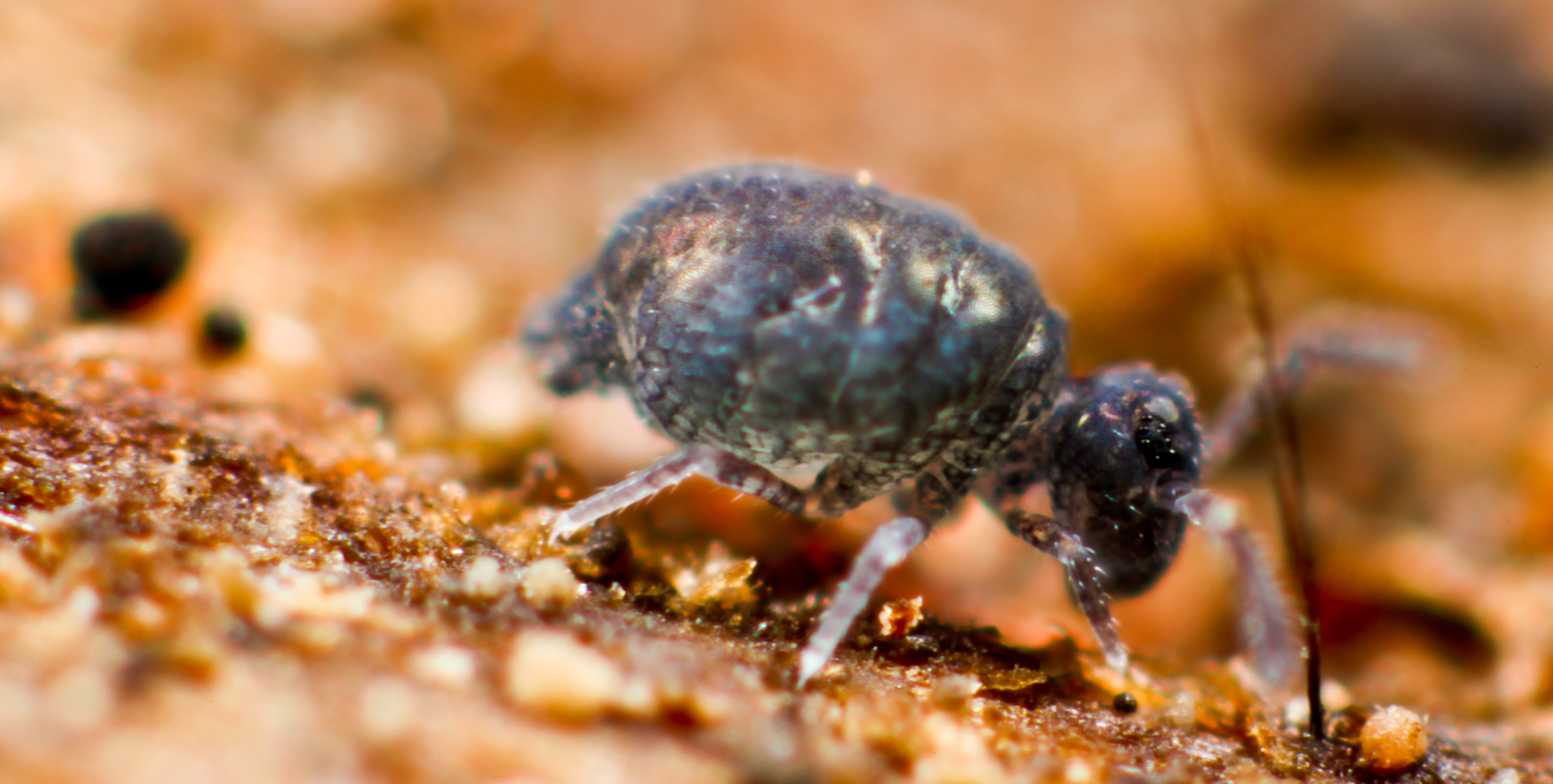
Sminthurinus niger

== Species ==
- Sminthurinus albifrons Tullberg, 1871
- Sminthurinus atrapallidus Snider, 1978
- Sminthurinus aureus (Lubbock, 1862)
- Sminthurinus bimaculatus (Lubbock, 1862)
- Sminthurinus conchyliatus Snider, 1978
- Sminthurinus concolor (Meinert, 1896)
- Sminthurinus distinctus Kang J-S & Lee B-H, 2005
- Sminthurinus domesticus (Gisin, 1963)
- Sminthurinus elegans (Fitch, 1862)
- Sminthurinus henshawi (Folsom, 1896)
- Sminthurinus igniceps Reuter, 1881
- Sminthurinus intermedius Snider, 1978
- Sminthurinus kaha Christiansen and Bellinger, 1992
- Sminthurinus koreanus Dányi and Park, 2016
- Sminthurinus latimaculosus Maynard, 1951
- Sminthurinus lawrencei Gisin,1963
- Sminthurinus macgillivrayi (Banks, 1897)
- Sminthurinus maculosus Snider, 1978
- Sminthurinus minutus (Ryder, 1879)
- Sminthurinus niger (Lubbock, 1868)
- Sminthurinus polygonius Snider, 1978
- Sminthurinus quadrimaculatus (Ryder, 1879)
- Sminthurinus radiculus Maynard, 1951
- Sminthurinus remotus Folsom, 1896
- Sminthurinus similitortus (Fitch, 1862)
- Sminthurinus sminthurinus (Mills, 1934)
- Sminthurinus trinotatus (Axelson, 1905)
