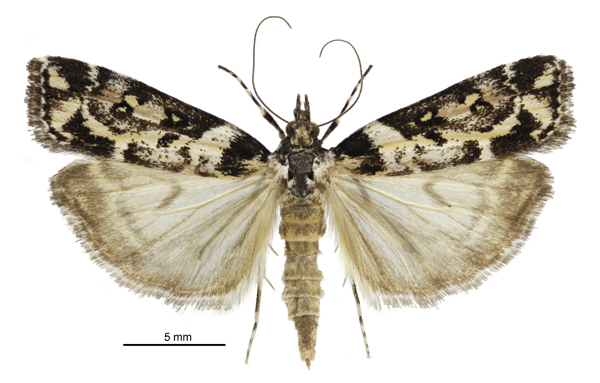
- Female

Scientific classification
- Kingdom: Animalia
- Phylum: Arthropoda
- Class: Insecta
- Order: Lepidoptera
- Family: Crambidae
- Genus: Eudonia
- Species: E. diphtheralis

Binomial name
- Eudonia diphtheralis (Walker, [1866])

Synonyms
- Scoparia diphtheralis Walker, [1866]

= Eudonia diphtheralis =

Species of moth

Eudonia diphtheralis is a species of moth in the family Crambidae. It is endemic to New Zealand.

The larvae feed on grasses, herbs and bryophytes.

== Original description ==
In 1884 Edward Meyrick wrote:

Wingspan for males and females is 23–26 mm. Head pale ochreous, face black. Palpi 2 1/4, black, mixed with white, basal joint white. Antennae black, beneath ochreous-whitish. Thorax white, anterior half, a square central spot, and posterior extremity suffused with black. Abdomen whitish-ochreous, slightly irrorated with grey, segmental margins more ochreous towards base. Legs white, thinly sprinkled with black, tibiae and tarsi banded with black. Forewings elongate, triangular, costa hardly arched, apex rounded, hindmargin sinuate, slightly oblique; white, irregularly irrorated with black scales which are ochreous at their base; a triangular blackish spot on costa at base, apex extended to form a smaller spot, but not quite reaching inner margin; inner margin beneath this whitish-ochreous; a broad cloudy white line near first line, more or less confluent with it above; first line broad, cloudy, white, oblique, hardly curved, rather irregular, posteriorly blackish-margined, forming a cloudy triangular blackish spot towards costa; a pale ochreous-yellowish streak along submedian fold from basal spot to anal blotch; orbicular roundish, whitish-ochreous, broadly back-margined, detached; claviform small, oblique, black, sometimes pale-centred, detached; reniform 8-shaped, whitish-ochreous, black-margined, connected with costa by a small blackish spot, between which and second line is a whitish suffusion; space between orbicular and reniform, and between reniform and second line, clothed with peculiarly appressed brassy prismatic scales, appearing as though transparent; second line broad, white, blackish-margined; terminal space wholly suffused with black; subterminal line broad, white, more or less pale ochreous-yellowish on veins, generally interrupted above middle, apex of lower portion touching second line; a hindmarginal row of white dots: cilia grey, with two darker lines, basal third slightly barred with whitish, tips whitish. Hindwings 1 1/2, whitish-ochreous, partially irrorated with grey; lunule, postmedian line, and a tolerably defined hindmarginal band rather dark grey; cilia ochreous-whitish, with two dark grey lines.

A fine species, differing from all others by the peculiar prismatic spots preceding and following reniform.

Hamilton, Palmerston, Napier, Wellington, Christchurch, and Otira Gorge, from December to March, usually near forest; common where it occurs, but I have never taken it except at lamps, and always females only; I have seen one male, taken by Mr. R. W. Fereday, and perhaps sixty females.
