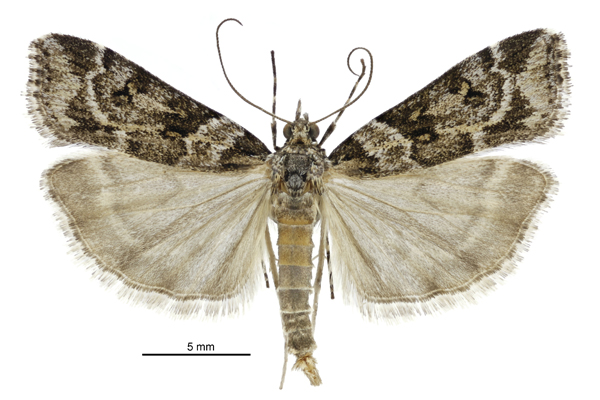
- Male

Scientific classification
- Kingdom: Animalia
- Phylum: Arthropoda
- Class: Insecta
- Order: Lepidoptera
- Family: Crambidae
- Genus: Scoparia
- Species: S. tetracycla

Binomial name
- Scoparia tetracycla Meyrick, 1884

= Scoparia tetracycla =

Species of moth

Scoparia tetracycla is a species of moth in the family Crambidae. It is endemic in New Zealand.

== Taxonomy ==
This species was named by Edward Meyrick in 1884. Meyrick gave a description of the species in 1885. However the placement of this species within the genus Scoparia is in doubt. As a result, this species has also been referred to as Scoparia (s.l.) tetracycla.

== Description ==
The wingspan is about 25 mm. The forewings are ochreous-grey, irrorated with whitish. The lines are whitish and black-margined. The hindwings are pale fuscous-grey, with a darker hindmargin. Adults have been recorded on wing in March.
