= John Salmon (entomologist) =

New Zealand zoologist, botanist and entomologist (1910–1999)

John Salmon CBE
- Born: John Tenison Salmon; 28 June 1910; Wellington, New Zealand
- Died: 4 May 1999 (aged 88); Rotorua, New Zealand
- Siglum: J. T. Salmon
- Education: Victoria University College
- Known for: collembola Save Manapouri campaign
- Spouse: Pamela Wilton (m. 1948)
- Children: 4
- Relatives: Guy Salmon (son)
- Awards: Loder Cup (1967)
- Scientific career
- Fields: Entomology
- Workplaces: Dominion Museum; Victoria University College
- Author abbrev. (zoology): Salmon

John Tenison Salmon CBE (28 June 1910 – 4 May 1999) was a New Zealand photographer, entomologist, academic, conservationist, and author. His primary occupation was as an entomologist; first at the Dominion Museum (which later became Te Papa) and then at Victoria University College (now known as Victoria University of Wellington).

== Biography ==
Salmon was born in Wellington in 1910. His father, Charles Tenison Salmon, was a surveyor and civil engineer from Palmerston North. His father instilled in him a love for the outdoors and also passed on a passion for photography. Salmon went to primary school in Palmerston North and then boarded at Wellington College. His first job in 1928 was with the Land and Income Tax Department in the capital city and in parallel, he studied science at Victoria University College. His 1934 master's thesis in zoology was on springtails (collembola). That year, he started as an entomologist at the Dominion Museum and he helped with the move to the new building in Mount Cook.

Salmon continued his studies of collembola and submitted photos to the Royal Photographic Society in London, for which he was elected an associate in 1937. In 1938, he became the president of the Wellington Camera Club and in the same year, he was elected secretary for the Wellington Philosophical Society, which was the city's branch of the Royal Society of New Zealand. The Dominion Museum closed to the public in June 1942 due to the war. Salmon kept up his research and in 1946, he received a Doctor of Science (DSc). In 1948, he was elected president of the New Zealand Association of Scientific Workers. In the same year, he was a founding member of the Art Galleries and Museums Association of New Zealand and became their secretary. The Royal Entomological Society of London elected him a fellow in 1949. That year, he was also elected a Fellow of the Royal Society of New Zealand. A Nuffield Fellowship enabled him to travel to Britain in 1951, where he attended the conference of the World Federation of Scientific Workers. He was unsuccessful in an effort to moderate the political leanings of this body. As a consequence, the New Zealand group disaffiliated and formed the politically neutral body New Zealand Association of Scientists.

In early 1949, Salmon went from the Dominion Museum to Victoria University College; he would lecture in zoology for nearly three decades. During that time, he became a world authority on collembola. He was president of the Entomological Society of New Zealand from 1955 to 1957. In 1966, he became the head of the zoological department and gave it a more modern outlook. He also became a noted conservationist and argued strongly, and with the help of professional bodies, against power projects that flooded or permanently changed sites of significant beauty of ecological value. One key project that the public protest could not prevent was the conversion of the Aratiatia Rapids as part of the Aratiatia Power Station. Salmon published a book Heritage destroyed: the crisis in scenery preservation in New Zealand in 1960 and it became an important text that help shape the country's conservation movement, then in its infancy. In response, the government set up the Nature Conservation Council in 1962. He was then engaged with the Save Manapouri campaign and joined their national committee. His profile helped him with becoming deputy president of the Royal Forest and Bird Protection Society in 1971 and was instrumental in forming an alliance of environmental groups to oppose the Manapouri project. The Labour Party made support for the group's aims an election issue and it helped them win the 1972 general election.

Since the 1950s, Salmon had used colour photography and often scheduled trips and holidays so that he could photographs trees and shrubs when they were flowering. He approached the publisher of Heritage destroyed, A.H. & A.W. Reed, with the idea of a book in colour. New Zealand flowers and plants in colour, published in 1963, was one of the country's first large scale books in full colour and it remains his most influential book. Salmon continued publishing books on plants and over time, input from botanists ensured increased scientific rigour. His most substantial book, The native trees of New Zealand, was published in 1980 after he had retired from university.

Salmon won the Loder Cup, a conservation award, in 1967 for his work on bringing the negative impact of development to the awareness of the wider public. In the 1981 Queen's Birthday Honours, Salmon was appointed a Commander of the Order of the British Empire, for services to conservation.

In December 1948, Salmon married Pamela Wilton, who had been his technical assistant at the Dominion Museum. They first lived in Karori and then Karaka Bay; they were to have four sons. One of their son, Guy Salmon, became known as an environmentalist. After retirement in 1976, the Salmons moved to Waikanae and he was involved in local body politics through memberships to the Waikanae Community Council and Horowhenua County Council. With health declining, Salmon gave up his public roles in 1983 and they moved to Taupō where they had owned a holiday home for a long time. He worked on more books and revised earlier editions, with the increasing help from his wife. He died in Rotorua on 3 May 1999 and his wife completed his last two books. Pamela Salmon died in 2011.

== Recognition ==
The Campbell Island springtail species Parakatianna salmoni was named after Salmon by Keith Arthur John Wise in 1964, in recognition of his work on Campbell Island and role in the discovery of the species.
