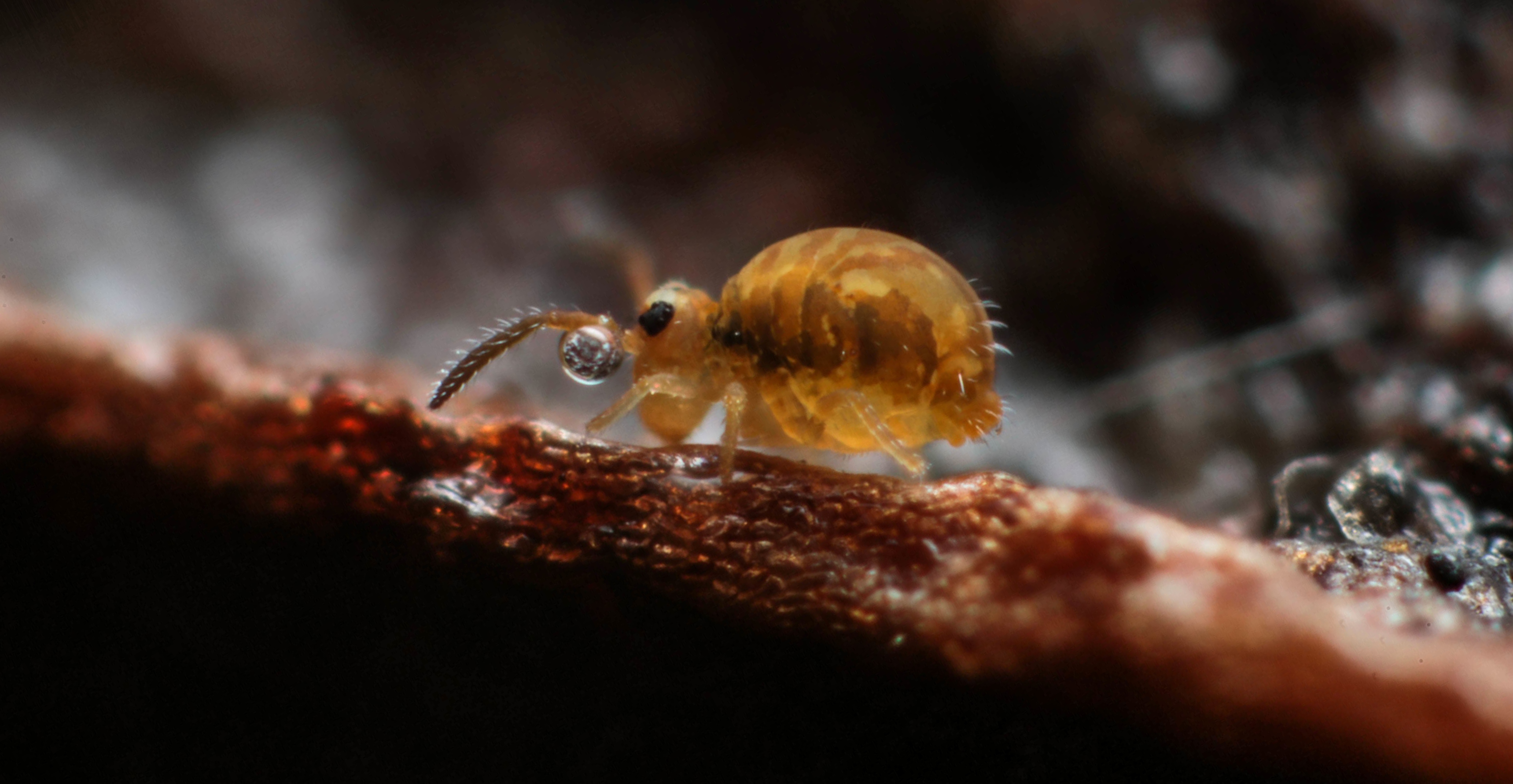
- Sminthurinus aureus

Scientific classification
- Kingdom: Animalia
- Phylum: Arthropoda
- Clade: Pancrustacea
- Class: Collembola
- Order: Symphypleona
- Superfamily: Katiannoidea
- Family: Katiannidae

Genera
- See text

= Katiannidae =

Family of springtails

Katiannidae is a family of Collembola. Genera of the family include Sminthurinus and Vesicephalus.

== Genera ==
- Arborianna Bretfeld, 2002
- Betschurinus R.Dallai & I.Martinozzi, 1980
- Borgesminthurinus Palacios-Vargas JG, 2020
- Coecobrya Yosii, 1956
- Cretokatianna A.Sánchez-García & M.S.Engel, 2016
- Dalianus Cassagnau, 1969
- Gisinianus Betsch, 1977
- Katianna C.Börner, 1906
- Katiannellina C.Delamare Deboutteville & Z.Massoud, 1963
- Katiannina Maynard EA & Downs WL, 1951
- Keratopygos K.A.Christiansen & E.Pike, 2002
- Metakatianna Denis, 1933
- Neokatianna R.J.Snider, 1989
- Papirinus Yosii, 1954
- Parakatianna H.Womersley, 1932
- Polykatianna J.T.Salmon, 1946
- Pseudokatianna J.T.Salmon, 1944
- Rusekianna Betsch & J-M, 1977
- Sminthurinus C.Börner, 1901
- Stenognathellus Cassagnau, 1953
- Vesicephalus W.R.Richards, 1964
- Zebulonia Betsch & J-M, 1970
