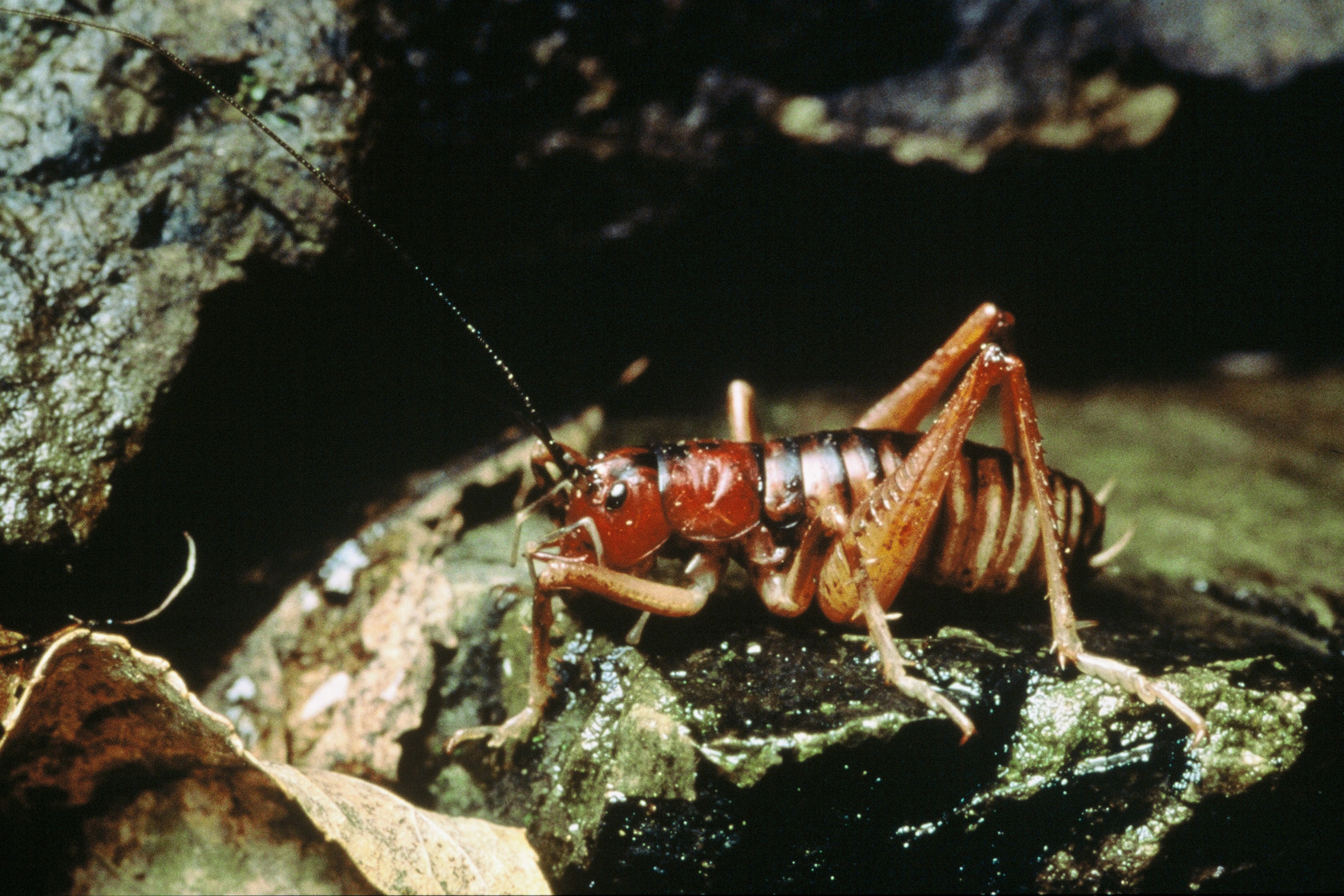

Conservation status
- Naturally Uncommon (NZ TCS)

Scientific classification
- Domain: Eukaryota
- Kingdom: Animalia
- Phylum: Arthropoda
- Class: Insecta
- Order: Orthoptera
- Suborder: Ensifera
- Family: Anostostomatidae
- Genus: Motuweta
- Species: M. riparia

Binomial name
- Motuweta riparia Gibbs, 2002

= Motuweta riparia =

Species of orthopteran insect

Motuweta riparia, the Raukūmara tusked wētā, is a species of large flightless insect in the family Anostostomatidae. The species, like the related Mercury Islands tusked wētā has tusks which is used as a weapon. They are found near small shaded streams near the Raukūmara region, usually under rocks in their digged out chamber. The species is found in the Gisborne and Ōpōtiki Districts.
