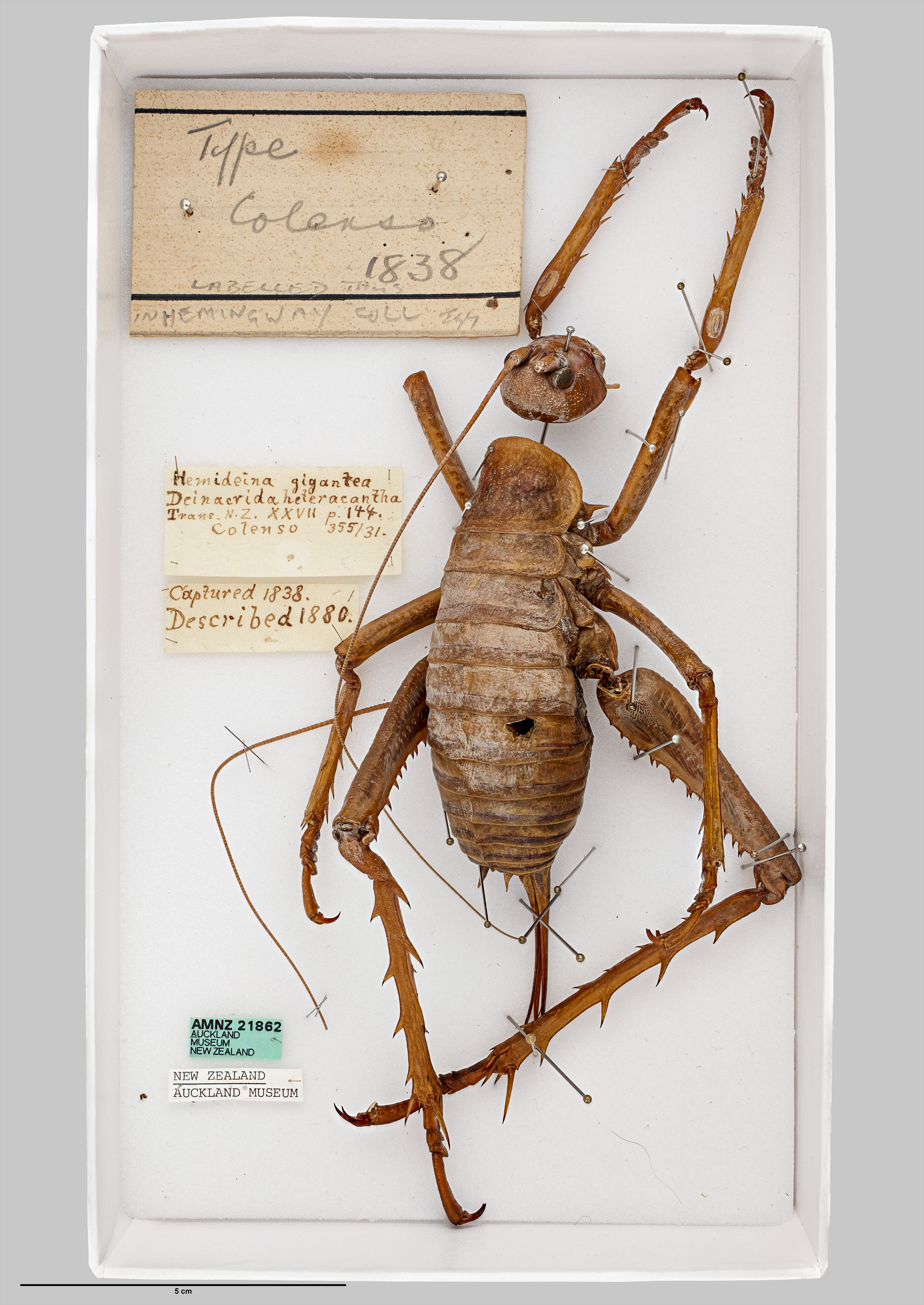
- Holotype specimen (female)

Conservation status
- Vulnerable (IUCN 2.3)

Scientific classification
- Kingdom: Animalia
- Phylum: Arthropoda
- Clade: Pancrustacea
- Class: Insecta
- Order: Orthoptera
- Suborder: Ensifera
- Family: Anostostomatidae
- Genus: Deinacrida
- Species: D. heteracantha

Binomial name
- Deinacrida heteracantha White, 1842
- Distribution (in green) of the Little Barrier giant wētā

Synonyms
- Hemideina gigantea Colenso, 1882

= Deinacrida heteracantha =

Species of giant cricket endemic to New Zealand

Deinacrida heteracantha, also known as the Little Barrier giant wētā or wētāpunga (Māori: wētāpunga), is a wētā in the order Orthoptera and family Anostostomatidae. It is endemic to New Zealand, where it survived only on Hauturu (Little Barrier Island). This very large flightless wētā mainly feeds at night, when it can be found above ground in vegetation. It has been classified as vulnerable by the IUCN due to ongoing population declines and restricted distribution. Its NZTCS threat classification was changed to "Threatened - Nationally increasing" in 2022 because it has been successfully translocated to seven predator-free islands.

== Taxonomy ==
Deinacrida heteracantha was first described by Scottish zoologist Adam White in 1842. William Colenso described the species as Hemideina gigantea in 1882; a name which was later brought into synonymy with D. heteracantha. The holotype that Colenso used, collected in 1839, is the oldest known entomological specimen of a New Zealand species located in New Zealand.

== Description ==
Wētāpunga is the largest of the Deinacrida species. In captivity gravid Deinacrida heteracantha can weigh up to 70 g (2.5 oz), but on average adult females weigh 32 g and adult males 7.4 g. Average body length of adult females is around 65 mm (2.6 in) from head to tip of abdomen. It is a sexually dimorphic species, with the females being much larger than the males. These large wētā have a broad body and a round head, along with short mandibles. Compared to other cricket species, wētā have relatively short antennae, but can deliver a strong kick with their hind legs. They are wingless. The species is mainly herbivorous and feeds on forest foliage.

White's original description of D. heteracantha is as follows:

Hind legs nearly twice the length of the insect; tibiae quadrangular, broadest behind, the edges armed with spines coming out alternately; spines very strong and sharp: body brown, beneath yellow: head punctured on the vertex; antennae at least 2 1/2 times the length of the insect: thorax punctured, with some small smoothish spaces in the middle; the lateral margins somewhat thickened: the head is not nearly so broad nor so large as in Anostostoma; the mandibles much shorter; the labial palpi have the terminal joint swollen at the end, when dry it is slightly compressed from shrinking; the maxillary palpi are very long; the three last joints cylindrical, the last longest, gradually clubbed at the end.

== Habitat ==
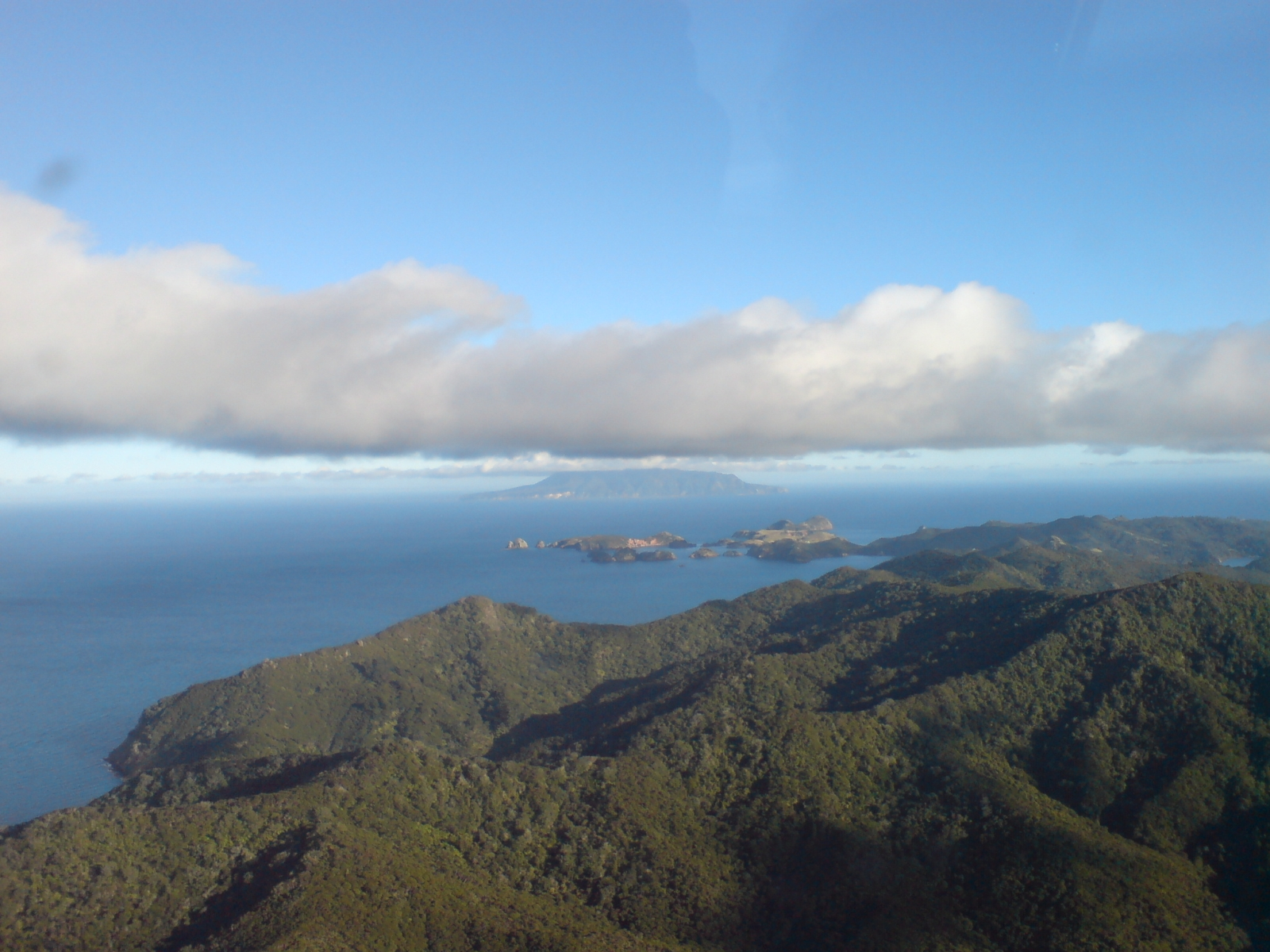
Little Barrier Island

D. heteracantha are arboreal forest insect dwellers found on Little Barrier Island which lies off the coast of New Zealand. This island is only 3,083 hectares (7,620 acres) in size. In the past, they also occupied forests in the warmer parts of North Island including Northland and Auckland, before their extinction there sometime during the 19th century. Their habitat range on Little Barrier Island is from second-growth forests located on the lower slopes of the island to the mid-level tall kauri forest. The second-growth forest is dominated by silverfern, nīkau palm, mahoe, and kohekohe.

== Behaviour ==
As adults, these giant wētā live a nomadic lifestyle, moving to new locations periodically. They live a solitary lifestyle, and most of their activity is done at night (i.e. feeding and moving). They can be found above ground level, under loose bark, or in the cavities of mahoe and pōhutukawa trees. During the day and night males tend to move farther than the females. The male would follow the female by staying back about 25 cm from her; this is observed during the night time.

== Life cycle and reproduction ==
The life cycle of D. heteracantha is not tied to the seasons. They can live for up to two years. Eggs are laid in the summer months from October to December. The eggs will then hatch in March and April of the following year. D. heteracantha mate most months out of the year except for the winter months from June–August. Copulation will start in the morning and continue throughout the day. During copulation the spermatophore from the male is inserted into the female's subgenital plate. Females lay their eggs at night into moist soil. Each egg is laid singly or in groups of five in area that is about 15 cm^{2} and about 2–3 cm deep. Females produce an indefinite amount of eggs. Females lay eggs for the rest of their lives, but only a limited number of them are fertilised during each copulation. The eggs incubate on average for 125 days and only 36% of the eggs survive to hatch.

After the eggs hatch there are ten instars that they go through until death. In females the ovipositor becomes visible at the third instar. At the sixth instar the difference between male and female sexes becomes obvious. Each instar lasts on average between five and six weeks. D. heteracantha has an extra instar compared to other species in its genus, this extra instar is what makes the nymphal period longer and their overall body size larger.

D. heteracantha show no courtship rituals. No stridulatory signals have been observed; sex recognition is done by contact only.

== Sound generation ==
D. heteracantha possesses a stridulatory apparatus. This apparatus is the sound producing organ based on the mechanism of rubbing one body part against another body part. There is a great variety in these structures seen in Orthoptera. Certain behaviours are associated with the sounds being produced by the Orthoptera. In the case of D. heteracantha there is a wide variation in the gross morphology of their stridulatory structures. Their stridulation plays a role in interspecific defense mechanisms. They use a femoro-abdominal mechanism to produce sound. This mechanism has two parts to it, a femoral peg and an abdominal ridge. The femoral pegs are an elongated and raised structure. There are two abdominal ridges present on D. heteracantha, a major and minor ridge. The major ridge is longer and higher than the minor ridge. The minor ridge does not normally come in contact with the femoral pegs. D. heteracantha has a wide-band linear magnitude spectra (kHz) that they produce for defensive sounds. They have a major peak at 20 kHz and a minor peak around 40–50 kHz. The shape of their stridulatory mechanism is why they can produce these frequency ranges.

== Threats ==
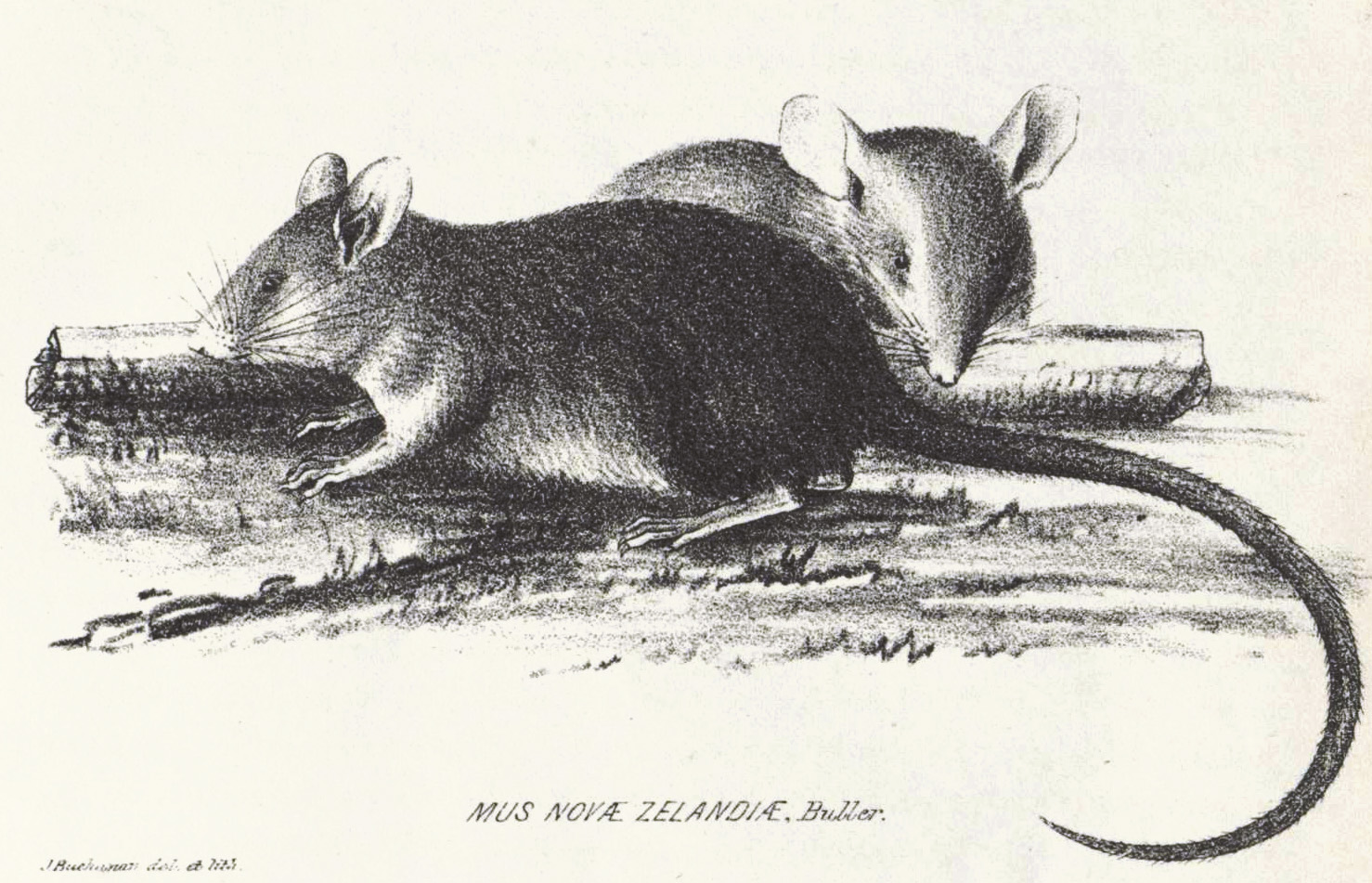
Polynesian rat (kiore)

While D. heteracantha were commonly seen on Little Barrier Island in the 1950s, numbers have declined strongly since then. Predation rather than habitat destruction is regarded as the main cause for this. Feral cats were present on the island until they were completely eradicated in the 1980s, and may have fed on vulnerable juvenile D. heteracantha.

Polynesian rats (Rattus exulans), or kiore in the Māori language, are one of the top predators of D. heteracantha, preying mostly on juvenile wētās which they kill during the night. An increase of the Polynesian rat population occurred after feral cats were eradicated. As saddlebacks prey on the wētā during the day, D. heteracantha are thus under constant predation pressure. There is evidence suggesting that these rats have a negative impact on the population of these wētā, as is commonly the case with invasive rodents. The removal of the kiore in 2004 was a success. The population size grew back each year, and a four-fold increase was reported six years after the removal.

Other predators include tuatara (Sphenodon punctatus), geckos, the North Island brown kiwi (Apteryx mantelli) during the night, and kingfishers and the long-tailed cuckoo (Urodynamis taitensis) by day.

== Captive breeding and release ==
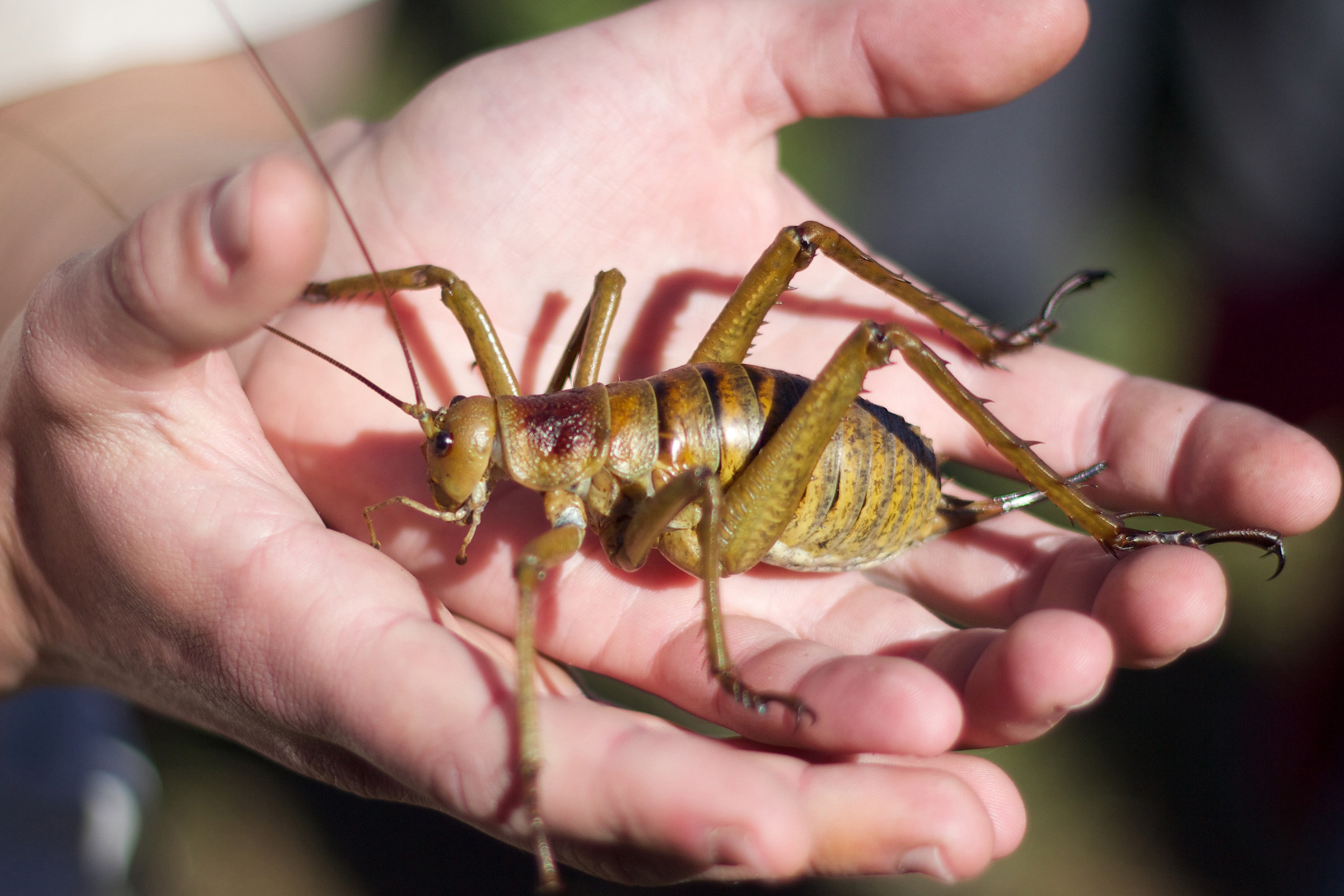
One of 150 D. heteracantha released on Tiritiri Matangi Island on 1 May 2014

D. heteracantha is currently classified as vulnerable by the IUCN. Since 2008, the Department of Conservation has been involved in a captive breeding and release programme to mitigate the risk of having the entire population resident on one island. Individuals captured on Hauturu/Little Barrier Island have been successfully bred in captivity at Butterfly Creek and Auckland Zoo. The descendants have been released onto Motuora and Tiritiri Matangi Islands. Additionally adults from Hauturu/Little Barrier Island have been transferred directly to Motuora. It is hoped that the released D. heteracantha will eventually build up self-sustaining populations on these additional predator free islands. In 2016, an adult female was observed on Tiritiri Matangi Island in the area where the first population was released. She can only be a descendant of the initial translocated population of 25 individuals released in 2011. Individuals translocated onto Tiritiri Matangi island in 2014 have been observed mating. In 2018, 300 wētāpunga from Auckland Zoo were translocated to an island in the Noises; at that point, 4,300 captive-bred individuals had been released on islands in the Hauraki Gulf. In 2023, more than 300 juveniles were released onto two islands in the Bay of Islands.

== See also ==
- List of largest insects
