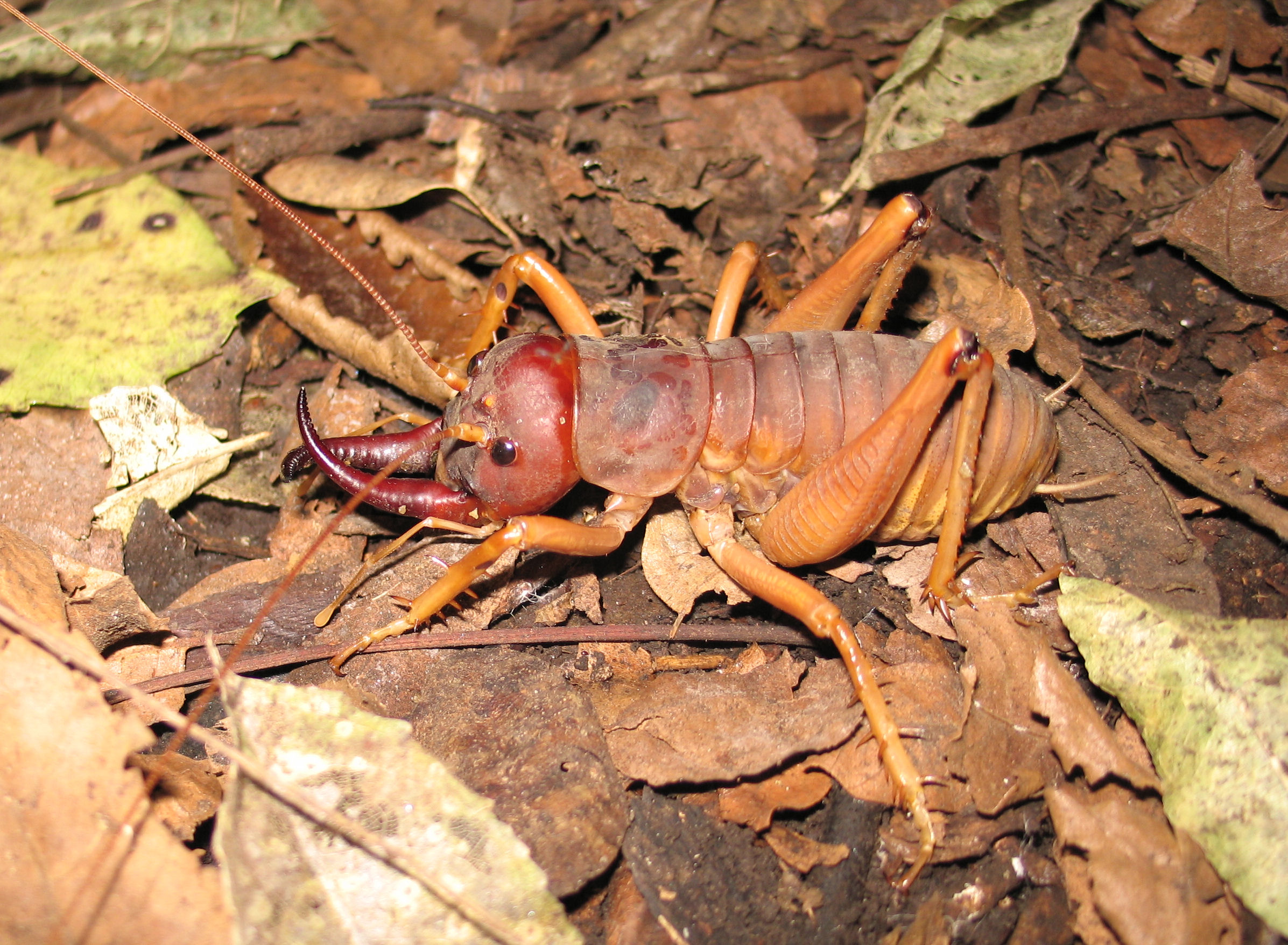
- Motuweta isolata

Scientific classification
- Kingdom: Animalia
- Phylum: Arthropoda
- Clade: Pancrustacea
- Class: Insecta
- Order: Orthoptera
- Suborder: Ensifera
- Family: Anostostomatidae
- Subfamily: Anostostomatinae
- Genus: Motuweta; Johns, 1997

= Motuweta =

Genus of orthopteran insects

Motuweta is a genus consisting of two species of tusked wētā in the family Anostostomatidae, endemic to New Zealand. The Northland tusked wētā, Anisoura nicobarica, may belong in this group, in which case the genus Motuweta would become a junior synonym of Anisoura.

== Species ==
- Motuweta isolata Johns, 1997 • Mercury Islands tusked wētā
- Motuweta riparia Gibbs, 2002 • Raukumara tusked wētā
