= H. monstrosus =

H. monstrosus may refer to:

- Hemiandrus monstrosus, a synonym for Anisoura nicobarica, the Northland tusked weta, an insect species endemic to New Zealand
- Homo monstrosus, a synonym for Homo sapiens
- Hypsignathus monstrosus, the hammer-headed bat or big-lipped bat, a bat species widely distributed in equatorial Africa
