= Anabropsini =

Scientific classification
- Domain: Eukaryota
- Kingdom: Animalia
- Phylum: Arthropoda
- Class: Insecta
- Order: Orthoptera
- Suborder: Ensifera
- Family: Anostostomatidae
- Subfamily: Anabropsinae
- Tribe: Anabropsini; Rentz & Weissman, 1973

Type genus
- Anabropsis Rehn, 1901

Genera
- 5, see text.

Tribe of cricket-like animals

Anabropsini is a tribe of king crickets. The tribe comprises over 40 species, has a broad distribution in Old and New World tropics, including Asia, Africa, Oceania, Central America, and South America.

== Description ==
Tribes in the subfamily Anabropsinae are distinguished from each other by the shape of the tenth abdominale tergite in males. While the tergite may be narrowed or hooked in other tribes, it is "normal and rather large" in Anabropsini. Members of the tribe bear a "single, distinct longitudinal keel on the external pagina of the hind femur".

== Taxonomy ==
The tribe Anabropsini was erected in 1973 by David C. F. Rentz and David B. Weissman in the Proceedings of the Academy of Natural Sciences of Philadelphia. The type genus Anabropsis was first formally described in 1901 by American entomologist James Abram Garfield Rehn.

Genera include:

- Anabropsis Rehn, 1901
- Apteranabropsis Gorochov, 1988
- Exogryllacris Willemse, 1963
- Paterdecolyus Griffini, 1913
- Pteranabropsis Gorochov, 1988
