= Cnemotettix bifasciatus =

Scientific classification
- Domain: Eukaryota
- Kingdom: Animalia
- Phylum: Arthropoda
- Class: Insecta
- Order: Orthoptera
- Suborder: Ensifera
- Family: Anostostomatidae
- Genus: Cnemotettix
- Species: C. bifasciatus

Binomial name
- Cnemotettix bifasciatus Rentz & Weissman, 1973

Species of cricket-like animal

Cnemotettix bifasciatus is a species of wetas & king crickets in the family Anostostomatidae. It is found in North America.
