= Leiomelus brunneifrons =

Scientific classification
- Kingdom: Animalia
- Phylum: Arthropoda
- Clade: Pancrustacea
- Class: Insecta
- Order: Orthoptera
- Suborder: Ensifera
- Family: Anostostomatidae
- Genus: Leiomelus
- Species: L. brunneifrons

Binomial name
- Leiomelus brunneifrons Ander, 1936

Species of insect

Leiomelus brunneifrons is a species of cricket. It has been found in Chile.
