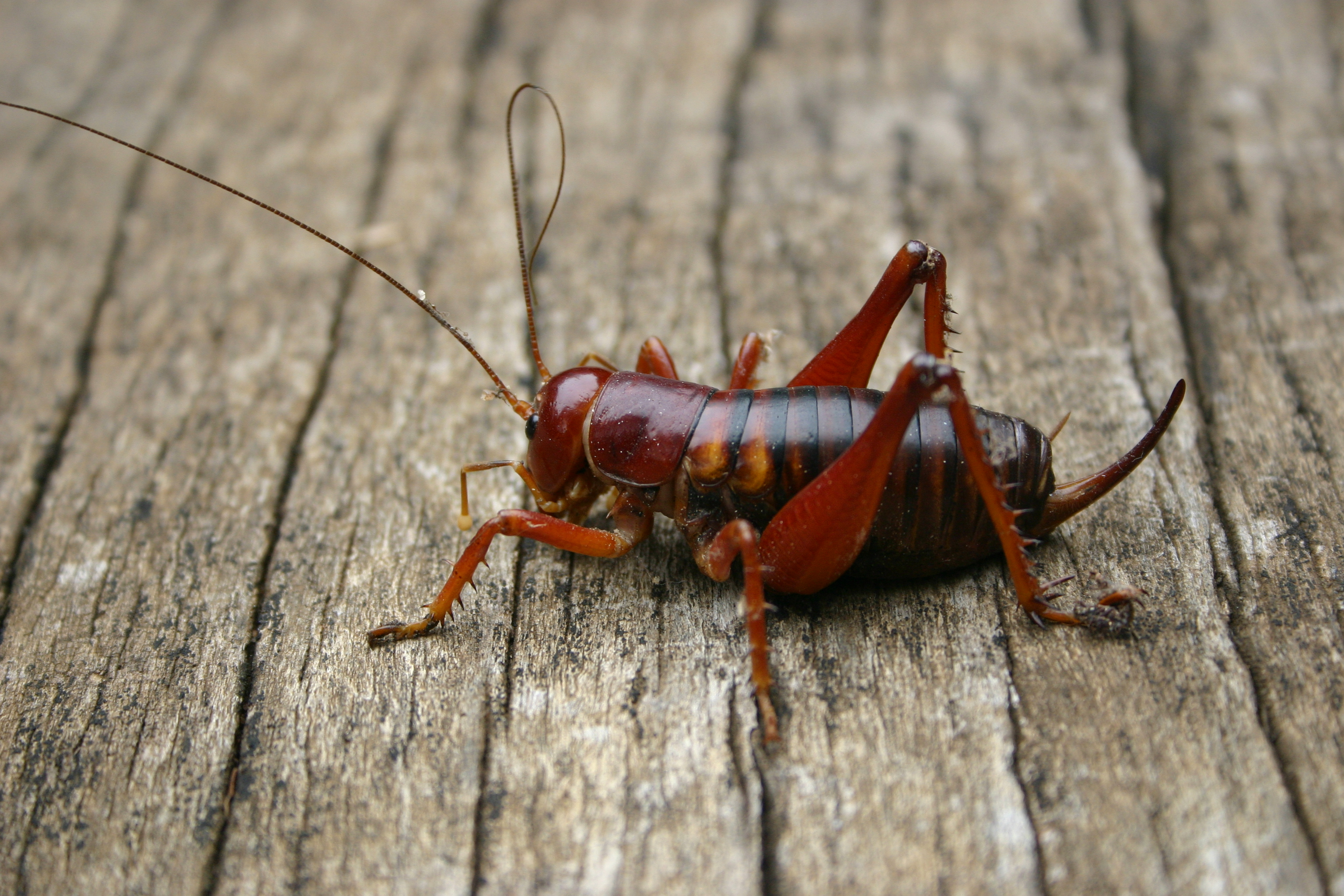

Scientific classification
- Kingdom: Animalia
- Phylum: Arthropoda
- Clade: Pancrustacea
- Class: Insecta
- Order: Orthoptera
- Suborder: Ensifera
- Family: Anostostomatidae
- Genus: Libanasidus
- Species: L. vittatus

Binomial name
- Libanasidus vittatus W. F. Kirby, 1899

= Parktown prawn =

Species of cricket-like animal

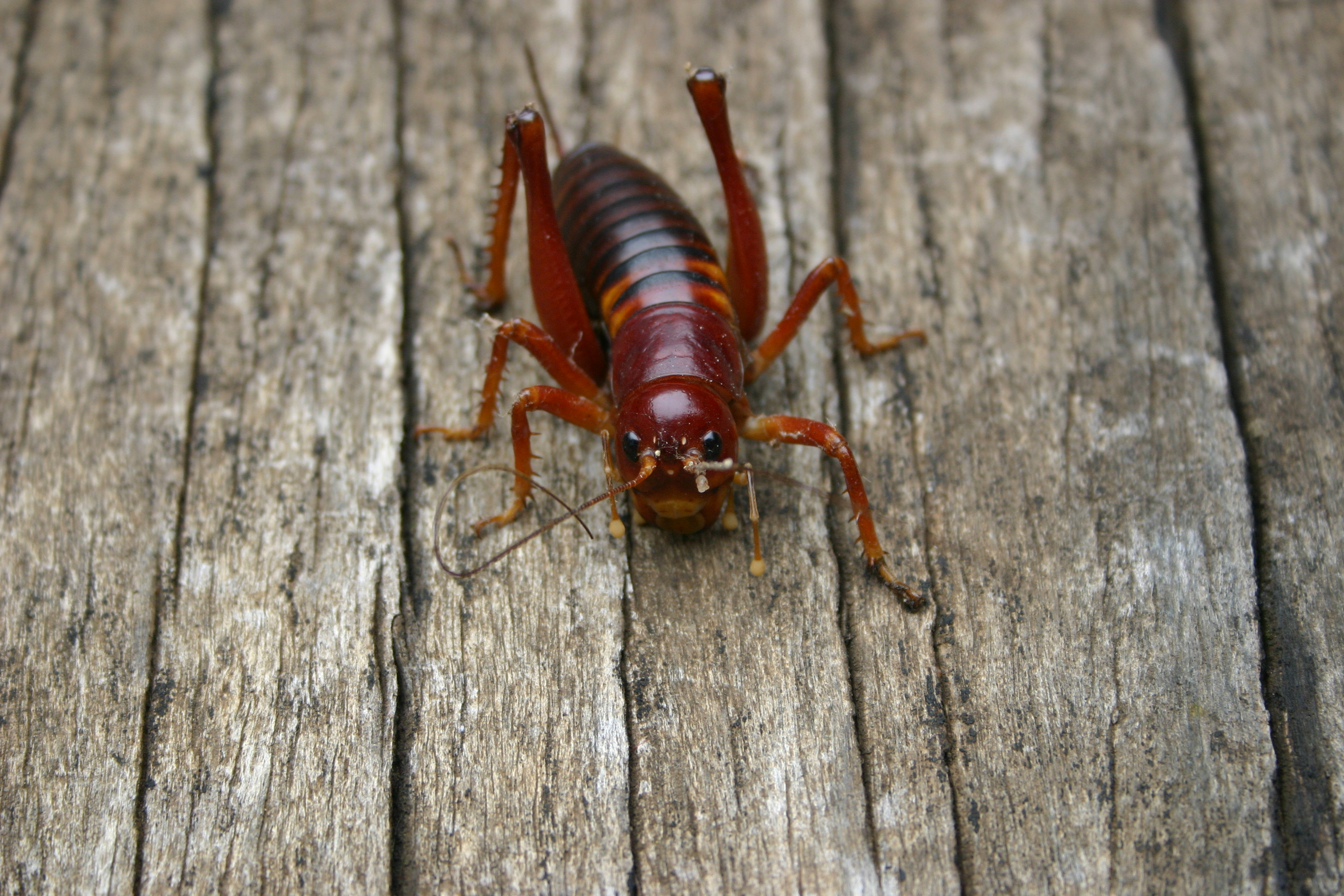
Female

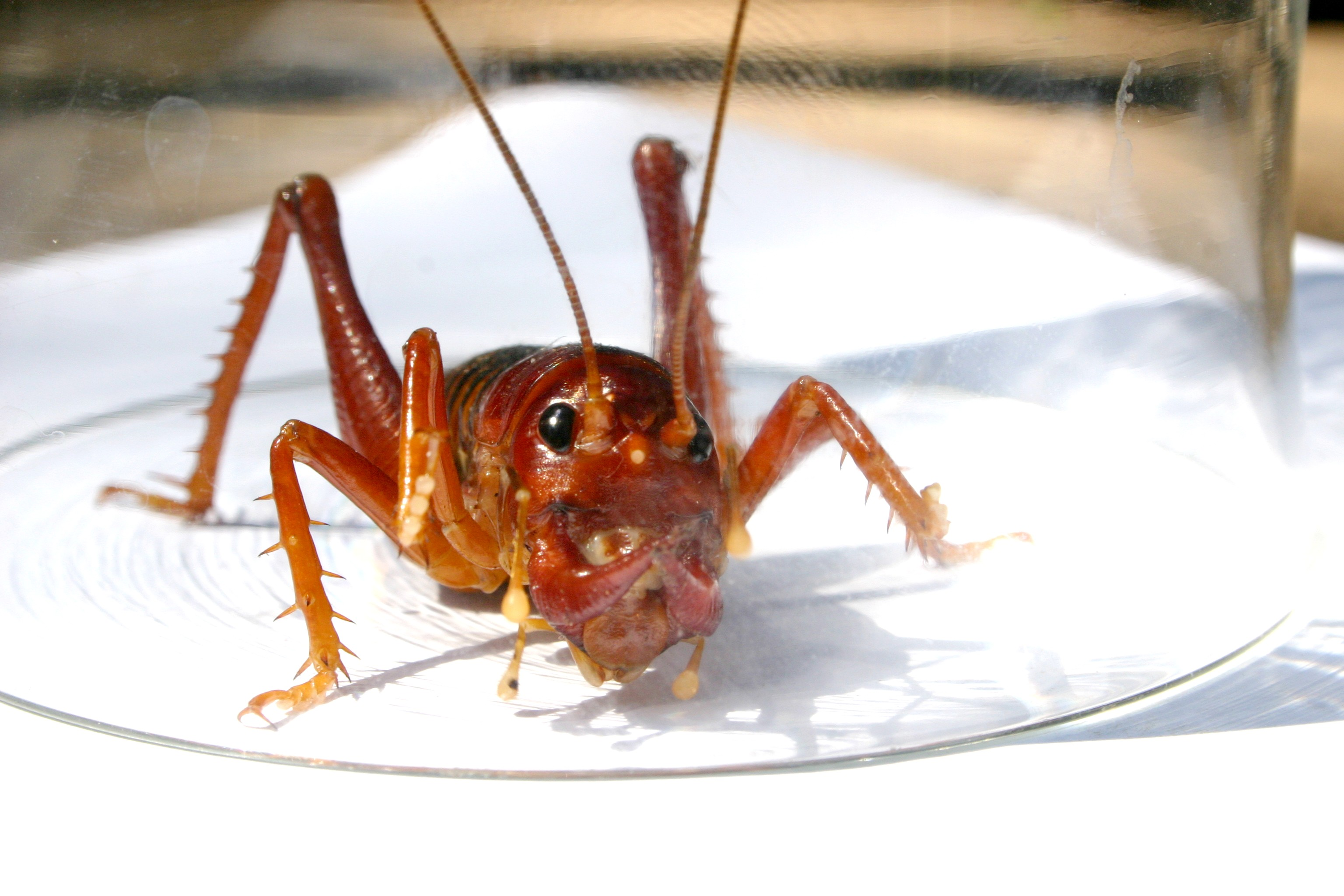
Male with "tusks" on mandibles

The Parktown prawn, African king cricket or tusked king cricket (Libanasidus vittatus) is a species of king cricket endemic to Southern Africa. It is unrelated to prawns, Libanasidus being insects in the order Orthoptera – crickets, locusts and similar insects. The king crickets are not true crickets either: they belong to the family Anostostomatidae, whereas true crickets are in the Gryllidae. The insect gets its English name from the suburb of Parktown in Johannesburg, South Africa, where they are common. It is found throughout Namibia, and in the southern savanna and semi-arid regions of Angola. The Parktown prawn is related to the New Zealand tree wētā, which is also in the family Anostostomatidae.

The Parktown prawn is held in low regard by many householders, but gardeners value them for controlling garden snail populations and attracting the hadeda ibis. The animal is omnivorous, with a diet that includes snails, other invertebrates, and vegetable matter. In urban environments, they will readily take food made available by suburban dwellers, including pet food and their droppings.

== History and discovery ==
Libanasidus vittatus was unknown within Johannesburg before the 1960s; the first known specimen was found in Barberton in 1899 by William Forsell Kirby. They only became prevalent after 1960, when Johannesburg began to expand rapidly in size. The reason for the increase in the insect's numbers is unclear, although they have done much better in an urban environment than in the wild, and it has been suggested that some ecological controlling factor is absent in its suburban habitat.

Johannesburg is on the South African highveld and has a dry climate, unsuitable habitat for the Parktown prawn. With the arrival of suburban dwellers, irrigated gardens provided lush, forest-like conditions, an environment more suited to king crickets. Certain suburbs in Johannesburg are very green and leafy, and represent a radical transformation of local flora.

== Description ==
The Parktown prawn is one of the larger invertebrates found around Johannesburg homes. A large specimen may grow to be 6 to 7 cm (2.8 in) or more, with long whip-like antennae extending to about the same length. The exoskeleton is orange to light brown, with darker brown or black stripes across the abdomen. The conspicuous markings probably are aposematic in effect. A large specimen can jump more than a metre high.

The male insect sports a strong set of tusk-like projections on its mandibles, although the need for them is not fully explained. It is suggested that they may be used in sexual competition between males. The female has a well-developed sword-like ovipositor, through which she may lay between 80 and 200 eggs in damp or wet topsoil during the mating season.

== Diet ==
Libanasidus vittatus is omnivorous, feeding on slugs, snails, and moth larvae such as cutworms, as well as a fairly wide range of vegetable matter. They have been seen feeding on dead birds and other carrion, the food of pet dogs and cats, pet droppings, dry oatmeal, and also on fallen fruit. They have been known to chew on wooden floor boards and wooden structures such as garden furniture, though they are not equipped to digest sound wood. Gardens that have a healthy population of Parktown prawns are practically free of slugs and snails, so gardeners who are aware of their habits regard Parktown prawns as an effective natural means of controlling such pests. In turn the king crickets have their own natural predators, such as the hadada ibis, fiscal shrike and helmeted guineafowl, birds at home in the urban habitat are able to deal with such large insects.

== Relationship with humans ==
Although perceptive South Africans commonly regard Parktown prawns as desirable in gardens, they can be unwelcome visitors indoors, where they are seen as pests; the insects can jump actively and often eject offensive black faecal liquids when threatened. Accordingly, they frighten nervous persons and they may chew carpets and fabrics. They most often emerge into the open after rain during summer, which also is when they are likeliest to be found indoors. Commonly they are most active at night. They have also been called "crickets from hell".

A popular urban legend, propagated by April Fools' Day articles published by the Johannesburg newspaper The Star, claims that the Parktown prawn was the result of a genetic experiment by students from the University of the Witwatersrand in the 1960s (thus explaining the insects' sudden arrival in Johannesburg at that time). The insect's unusual size, strength and vivid orange colouring are presented as confirmation of the idea.

The Parktown prawn has found its way into South African popular culture. Andrew Buckland's 1988 play The Ugly Noo Noo used Parktown prawns as part of an extended parody of South African politics of the time. They feature in the daily comic strip Madam & Eve.

The aliens in the film District 9 resemble anthropomorphic Parktown prawns, and are called "Prawns" by the human characters.

They are the subject of a song that was crowd-sourced, written and performed on 23 February 2018 by Amanda Palmer in Johannesburg, South Africa.
