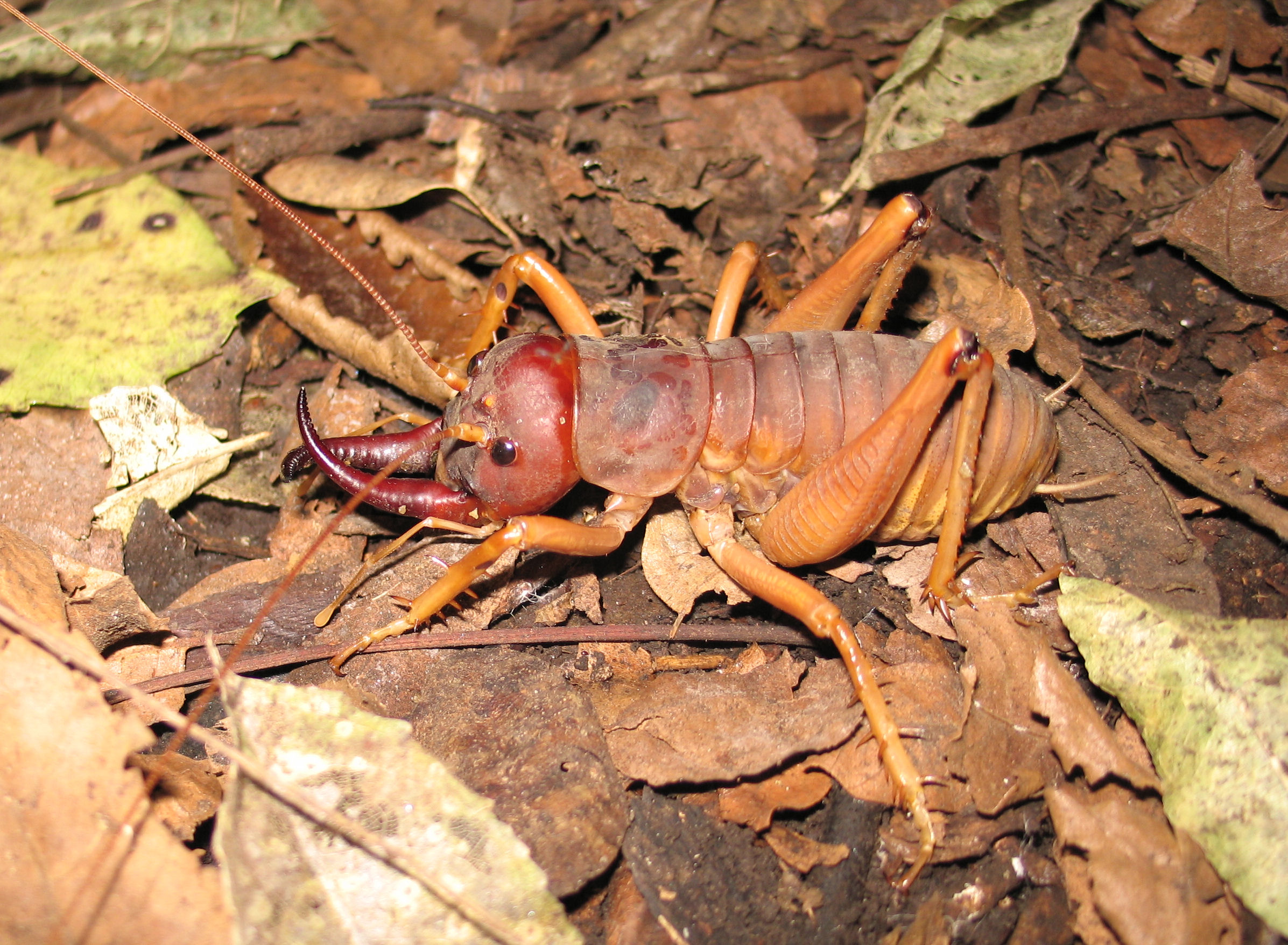

Conservation status
- Not Threatened (NZ TCS)

Scientific classification
- Kingdom: Animalia
- Phylum: Arthropoda
- Clade: Pancrustacea
- Class: Insecta
- Order: Orthoptera
- Suborder: Ensifera
- Family: Anostostomatidae
- Genus: Motuweta
- Species: M. isolata

Binomial name
- Motuweta isolata Johns, 1997

= Mercury Islands tusked wētā =

Species of orthopteran insect

The Mercury Islands tusked wētā, (Motuweta isolata), also known as the Middle Island tusked wētā, is a large flightless insect in the family Anostostomatidae, discovered in 1970 living on a single small island in New Zealand. Distinguished by the enormous tusks with which males fight, it was saved from extinction by a captive breeding programme and translocation: the entire world population is descended from a male and two females captured and bred in captivity in 1998, just before the species went extinct in the wild. Motuweta isolata is the largest of the three tusked wētā species, and the most endangered wētā, ranked Nationally Critical by the Department of Conservation.

== Taxonomy ==
Motuweta isolata was discovered in 1970 on Middle Island (Atiu in Māori) in the Mercury Islands group by herpetologist Tony Whitaker, and was nicknamed "Jaws". It was 15 years before more specimens were collected for research, and another 12 years before the species was finally described and named in 1997. Its name derives from the Māori word motu, or island. It was placed in its own genus, in a different subfamily to the Northland tusked wētā Anisoura nicobarica. Subsequent genetic research suggests that in fact all three known tusked wētā species are closely related, with their nearest relatives in New Caledonia, and should be classified in the same subfamily or even the same genus.

== Description ==
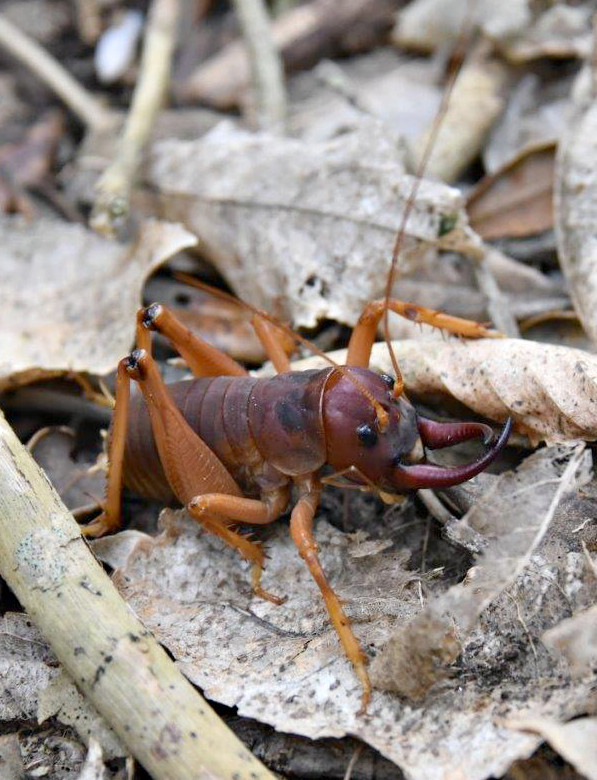
Motuweta isolata on Korapuki Island

M. isolata is the largest tusked wētā, 90 mm long. Captive males can weigh 28 g and females 37 g, though wild specimens are generally smaller: 23 and 25 g. Adult males have long brown tusks curving from their mandibles, projecting far in front of their head; these vary significantly in size between males. They use these to spar with other males in territorial pushing contests, each trying to overturn the other. If disturbed, they will raise their forelegs, hiss, and gnash their jaws; they stridulate by rubbing their femurs against their abdomen, and males can make a rasping noise by rubbing their tusks together. Both sexes will also defecate foul-smelling liquid faeces. Despite these displays, they rarely bite when handled.

Eggs are laid in the soil and take anywhere from three to nine months to hatch. From hatching to adulthood takes 16–17 months, and adults live for 6–10 months after their final moult.

== Ecology ==
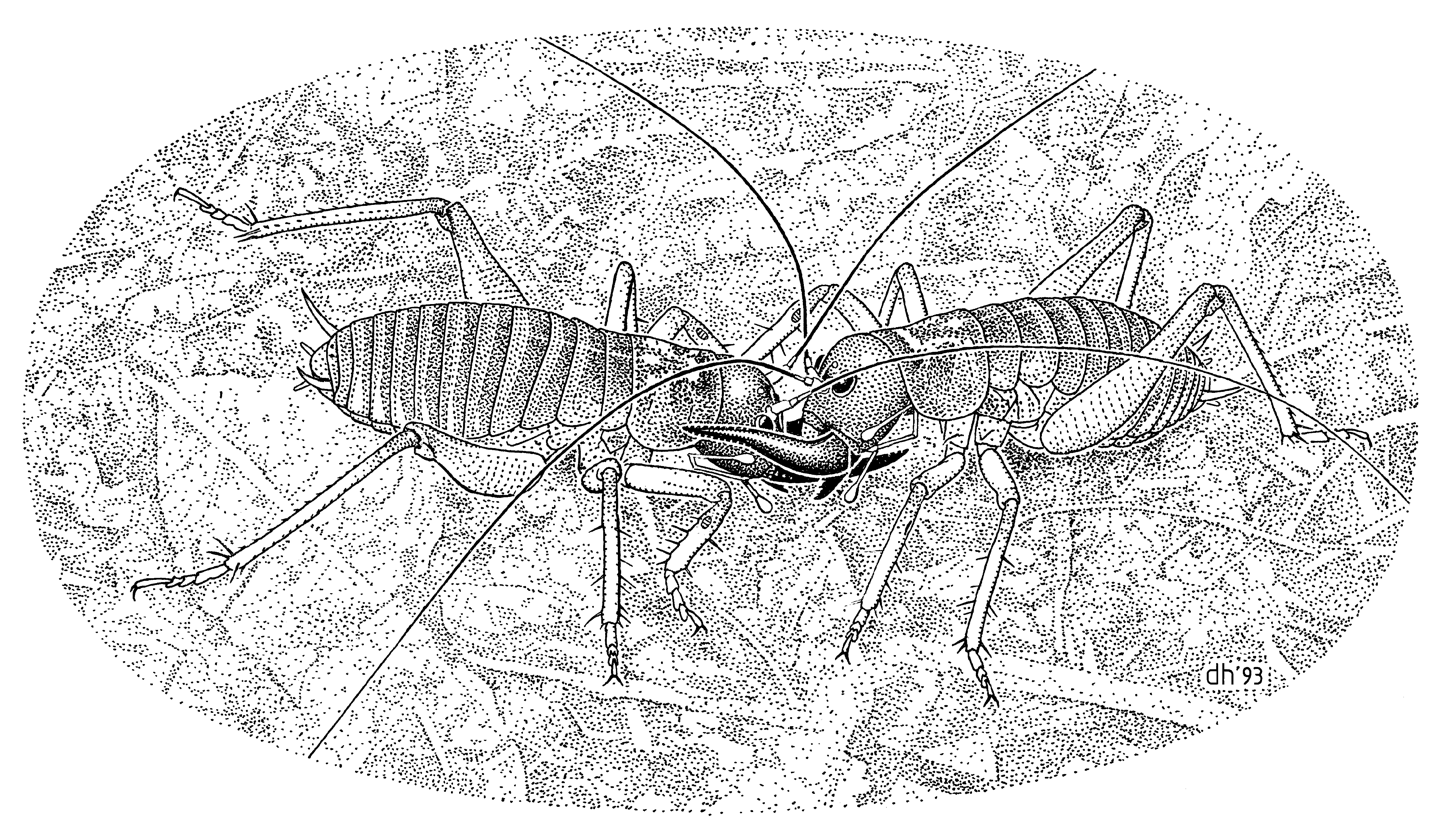
Motuweta illustrated by Des Helmore

Mercury Islands tusked wētā are nocturnal, hiding underground during the day. They dig a burrow and underground chamber, plaster and smooth the walls with saliva, back in, and seal the entrance with a plug made of soil and saliva. They are reluctant to emerge, coming out during the darkest nights when it is warm and moist and there is little moonlight. This seems to be a strategy for avoiding tuatara and the numerous lizards on the forest floor: M. isolata translocated to islands with fewer predators are more willing to emerge at night. M. isolata is largely carnivorous, feeding on invertebrates in the leaf litter, but will also eat plant material in captivity.

== Distribution and conservation ==
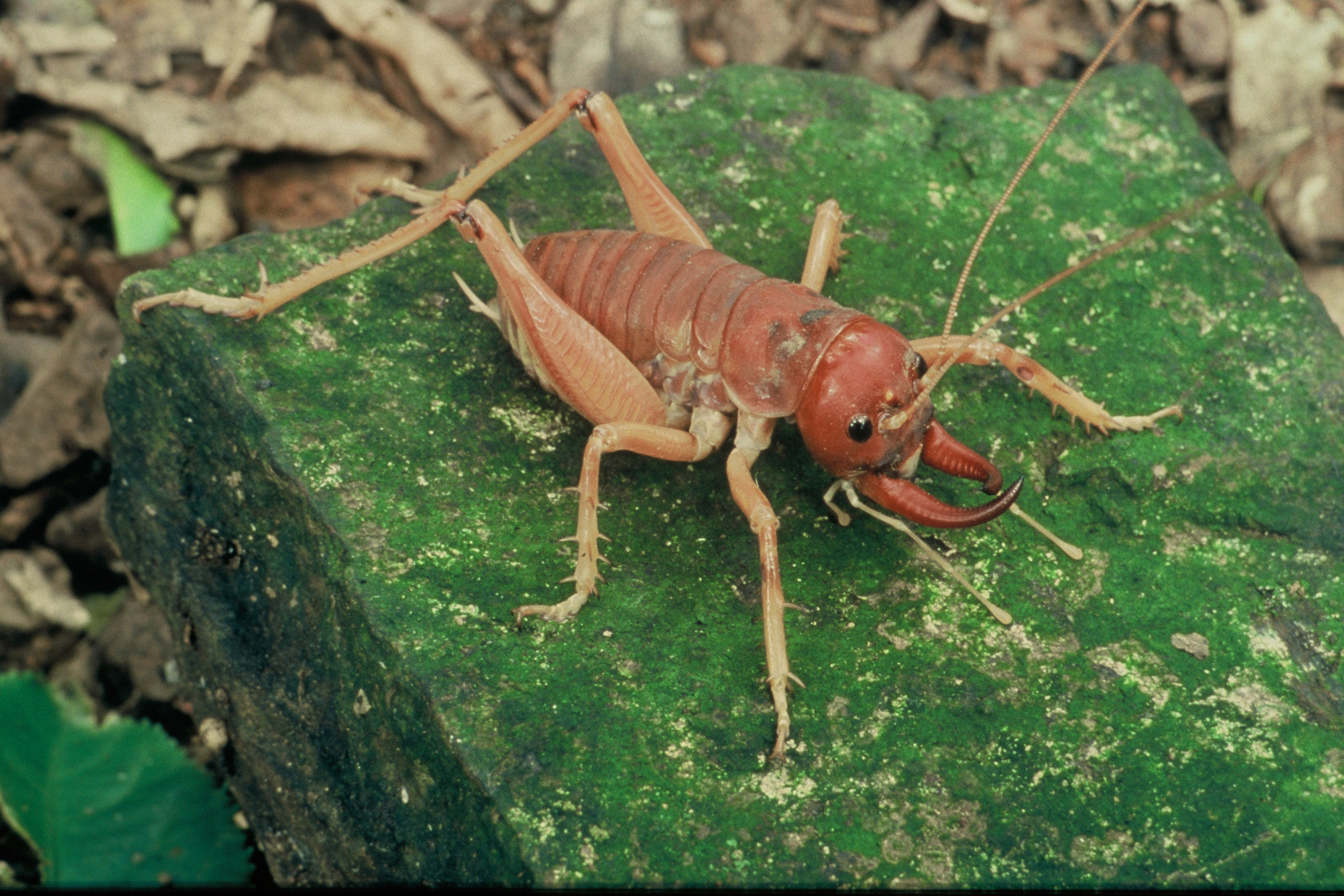
Motuweta isolata on Middle Island, 1993

Motuweta isolata are known naturally from just one island: Atiu/Middle Island in the Mercurys, an island group off the eastern coast of the Coromandel Peninsula. Middle Island is small, just 13 ha (32 acres), and free of introduced mammals, although it has several species of predators: giant centipedes, tuatara, lizards, and morepork. The island also has ground wētā (Hemiandrus) and a large population of burrow-nesting seabirds.

M. isolata were growing increasingly scarce on Middle Island during the 1990s, with an estimated population of less than 200, so a breeding programme was set up at the DSIR's Mt Albert Research Centre. In 1993–94, and again in 1998, two female and one male wētā were captured and bred in captivity by DOC ranger Rob Chappell and other entomologists. The first batch failed, but the 1998 trial produced 181 hatchlings, and 77 more in the second generation. In 2000–2001, 130 of the first generation of captive bred wētā were released onto two other islands in the Mercury group, Moturehu/Double Island and Whakau/Red Mercury. These islands had been cleared of their only mammalian predator, kiore, in 1989 and 1991. Regular monitoring showed immature wētā, indicating breeding, and the species has continued to spread and increase on both islands. Tracking tunnels showed that they were spreading out from their release site on Red Mercury by 50–100 m each year.

External videos
- Meet the Locals (2008 TVNZ video about M. isolata captive breeding)

This breeding programme was just in time, because tusked wētā were disappearing from Middle Island. In the 1980s, dozens could be seen in a single night, but between 1998 and 2003 biologists searched for a total of 64 nights and found only four. None have been seen there since 2001, despite eight searches between 2009 and 2012. Middle Island tusked wētā have either gone extinct on Middle Island, or dropped to such low numbers that they are undetectable. It is possible that Middle Island is drier than the rest of the Mercury Islands, and a prolonged drought drove the population there to extinction.

One conservation concern for Mercury Islands tusked wētā is loss of genetic diversity: from 2000 to 2009, 567 captive-bred individuals were released onto six islands, all descended from two females and a male taken from Middle Island in 1998. As well as the healthy populations on Moturehu and Red Mercury, M. isolata is now thriving on Ohinau, Kawhitu/Stanley and Korapuki Islands and is present in low numbers on Repanga/Cuvier Island. All were previously cleared of mammalian predators. It was also successfully introduced to AhuAhu/Great Mercury Island in 2021 after the owners eradicated mammalian predators in 2016. As a result, the threat classification, originally Nationally Critical, is now Not Threatened - Nationally Uncommon and the species seems safe from extinction.
