= Paterdecolyus =

Scientific classification
- Domain: Eukaryota
- Kingdom: Animalia
- Phylum: Arthropoda
- Class: Insecta
- Order: Orthoptera
- Suborder: Ensifera
- Family: Anostostomatidae
- Genus: Anabropsis
- Subgenus: Paterdecolyus; Griffini, 1913

Subgenus of cricket-like animals

Paterdecolyus is a subgenus of "king crickets" in the genus Anabropsis: found in India and Tibet.

== Species ==
See Anabropsis.
