= Lezina =

Scientific classification
- Kingdom: Animalia
- Phylum: Arthropoda
- Class: Insecta
- Order: Orthoptera
- Suborder: Ensifera
- Family: Anostostomatidae
- Subfamily: Lezininae
- Genus: Lezina; Walker, 1869

Species
- See text

Synonyms
- Magrettia Brunner von Wattenwyl, 1888

Genus of cricket-like animals

Lezina is a cricket genus in the family Anostostomatidae found in northern Africa and the Middle-East; it was formerly included in the family Gryllacrididae.

== Species ==
- Lezina acuminata Ander, 1938
- Lezina arabica Karny, 1937
- Lezina armata Popov, G. B., 1984
- Lezina concolor Walker, F., 1869
- Lezina mutica (Brunner von Wattenwyl, 1888)
- Lezina obscura (Burr, 1900)
- Lezina omanica Popov, G. B., 1984
- Lezina parva Popov, G. B., 1984
- Lezina persica (Adelung, 1902)
- Lezina peyerimhoffi (Chopard, 1929)
- Lezina saudiya Popov, G. B., 1984
- Lezina zarudnyi (Adelung, 1902)
