= Motuora =

Motuora Island
Māori: Motuora
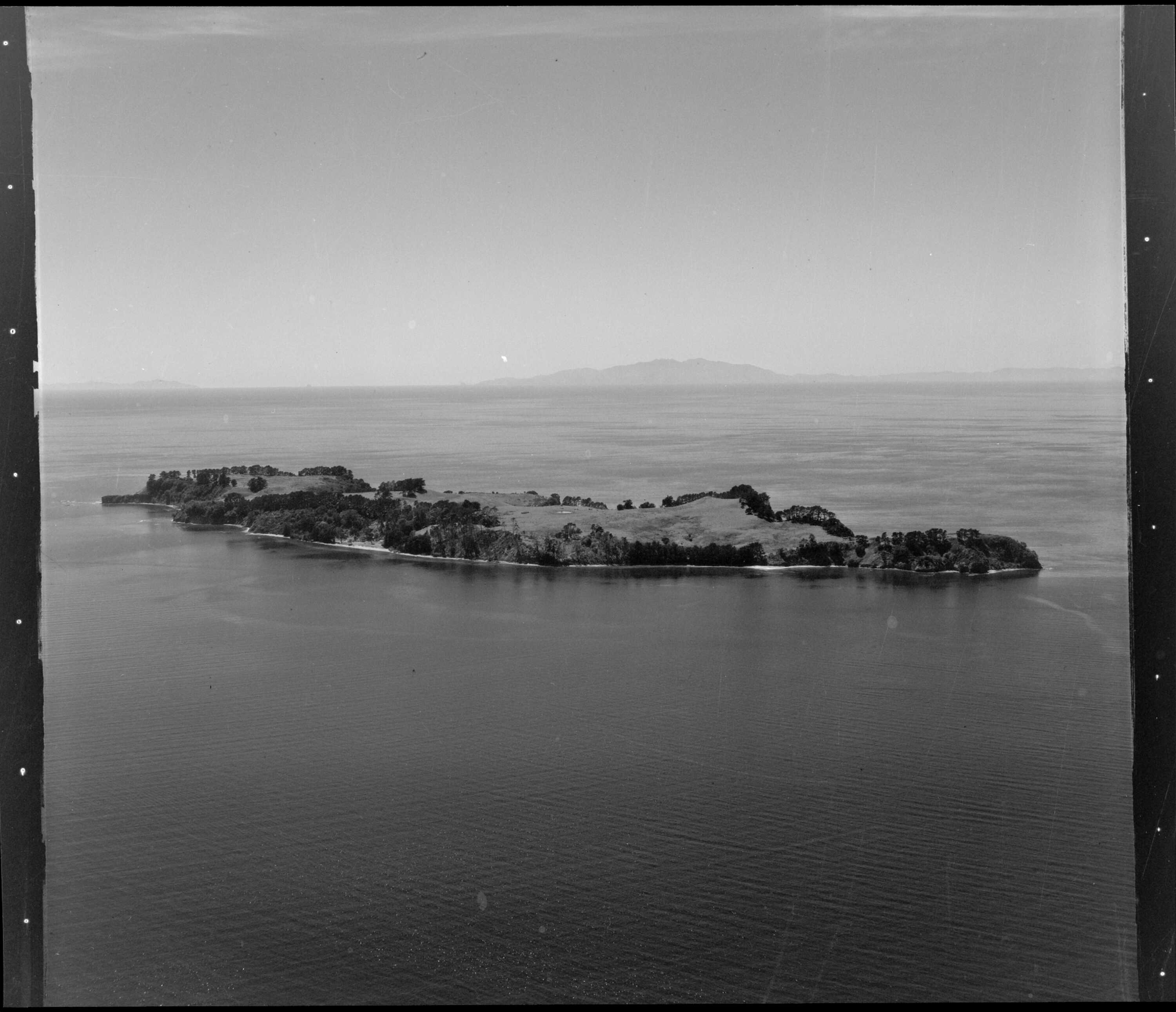
- Motuora Island seen in 1973
- Interactive map of Motuora Island

Geography
- Location: Hauraki Gulf
- Coordinates: 36°30′20″S 174°47′35″E
- Area: 80 ha (200 acres)
- Length: 2 km (1.2 mi)
- Width: 0.5 km (0.31 mi)
- Highest elevation: 67 m (220 ft)

Administration
- New Zealand

Motuora is an 80 ha (200 acres) island nature reserve in the western Hauraki Gulf, on the north-eastern coast of New Zealand's North Island. It lies some 6.2 km (3.9 mi) south-west of Kawau Island, 5 km (3.1 mi) east of Mahurangi Heads and 35 kilometres (22 mi) north of the city of Auckland.

== History ==
Although Motuora now has no permanent residents, it has a history of human occupation and was used for farming during much of the 20th century, when the native coastal forest was cleared apart from remnant patches along the cliffs. The island was bought by the government in 1965 as a recreation reserve. In 1990 a program of ecological restoration began, largely carried out by volunteers, with the Motuora Restoration Society (MRS) established in 1995. The MRS now manages the island jointly with the Department of Conservation (DOC).

== Environment ==
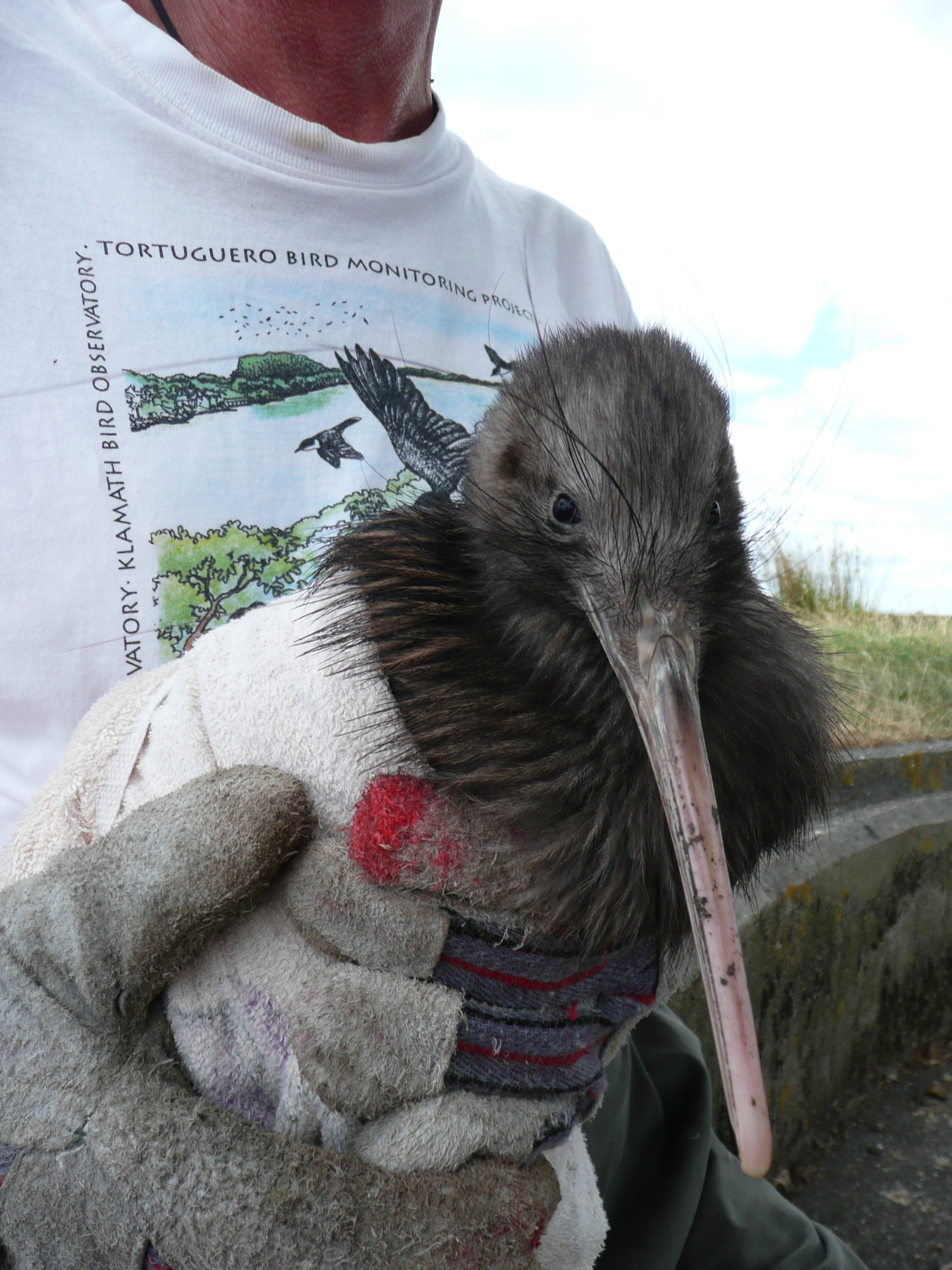
North Island brown kiwi management on Motuora as part of Operation Nest Egg

Extensive planting of native vegetation has taken place on the island in order to restore the original forest cover. Exotic mammals never became established there. Native animals that have been introduced (or reintroduced) as part of the ecosystem restoration program include wetapunga, shore skinks, and common, Pacific and Duvaucel's geckos.

=== Birds ===
The island supports a small breeding colony of Australasian gannets. Common diving petrel and Pycroft's petrel chicks have been translocated to the island in an effort to establish breeding colonies. Grey-faced petrels nest on the island. North Island brown kiwis chicks have been brought to the island since 1999 as part of the Department of Conservation's Operation Nest Egg, which uses predator-free islands as ‘kiwi creche’ sites before the birds are transferred to the mainland.
