= Cnemotettix =

Scientific classification
- Domain: Eukaryota
- Kingdom: Animalia
- Phylum: Arthropoda
- Class: Insecta
- Order: Orthoptera
- Suborder: Ensifera
- Family: Anostostomatidae
- Genus: Cnemotettix; Caudell, 1916

Genus of cricket-like animals

Cnemotettix is a genus of silk-spinning crickets in the family Anostostomatidae. There are about five described species in Cnemotettix.

== Species ==
These five species belong to the genus Cnemotettix:

- Cnemotettix bifasciatus Rentz & Weissman, 1973
- Cnemotettix caudulus Rentz & Weissman, 1973
- Cnemotettix miniatus Rentz & Weissman, 1973
- Cnemotettix pulvillifer Caudell, 1916
- Cnemotettix spinulus Rentz & Weissman, 1973
