= Leiomelus =

Scientific classification
- Kingdom: Animalia
- Phylum: Arthropoda
- Clade: Pancrustacea
- Class: Insecta
- Order: Orthoptera
- Suborder: Ensifera
- Family: Anostostomatidae
- Genus: Leiomelus; Ander, 1936

Species
- See text.

Genus of cricket-like animals

Leiomelus is a genus of king crickets in the family Anostostomatidae, endemic to Chile.

== Species ==
- Leiomelus armiger Ander, 1939
- Leiomelus brunneifrons Ander, 1936
- Leiomelus capito (Germain, 1903)
- Leiomelus denticauda Ander, 1936
