= Anabropsis =

Scientific classification
- Kingdom: Animalia
- Phylum: Arthropoda
- Class: Insecta
- Order: Orthoptera
- Suborder: Ensifera
- Family: Anostostomatidae
- Subfamily: Anabropsinae
- Tribe: Anabropsini
- Genus: Anabropsis; Rehn, 1901

Synonyms
- Schoenobates Saussure, 1859

Genus of cricket-like animals

Anabropsis is a genus of king crickets in the tribe Anabropsini. They are found tropical areas of the Americas, Africa and Asia.

== Species ==
The Orthoptera Species File currently lists five subgenera, until recently, all placed at genus level:

=== subgenus Anabropsis ===
Auth.: Rehn, 1901 - central Americas

species group alata (Brunner von Wattenwyl, 1888)

1. Anabropsis alata (Brunner von Wattenwyl, 1888)
2. Anabropsis longipenna Gorochov & Cadena-Castañeda, 2016
3. Anabropsis marmorata Rehn, 1905
4. Anabropsis rentzi Cadena-Castañeda & Cortés-Torres, 2013
5. Anabropsis weissmani Cadena-Castañeda & Gorochov, 2016

species group aptera (Brunner von Wattenwyl, 1888)

1. Anabropsis aptera (Brunner von Wattenwyl, 1888)
2. Anabropsis apteroides Cadena-Castañeda & Gorochov, 2016
3. Anabropsis chiapas Gorochov & Cadena-Castañeda, 2016
4. Anabropsis homerogomezi Cadena-Castañeda & Weissman, 2020
5. Anabropsis oaxaca Gorochov & Cadena-Castañeda, 2016
6. Anabropsis saltatrix (Saussure & Pictet, 1897)

species group mexicana (Saussure, 1859)

1. Anabropsis costaricensis Rehn, 1905
2. Anabropsis mexicana (Saussure, 1859) - type species (as Schoenobates mexicanus Saussure)
3. Anabropsis modesta Gorochov, 2001
4. Anabropsis spinigera Gorochov, 2001

species group microptera Gorochov, 2001

1. Anabropsis johnsi Cadena-Castañeda & Gorochov, 2016
2. Anabropsis kasparyani Gorochov & Cadena-Castañeda, 2016
3. Anabropsis microptera Gorochov, 2001
4. Anabropsis proxima Gorochov & Cadena-Castañeda, 2016

=== Apteranabropsis ===
Auth.: Gorochov, 1988 - China and Vietnam.

1. Anabropsis abramovi Gorochov, 2021 (2 subspecies)
2. Anabropsis ailaoshanica Gorochov, 2021
3. Anabropsis cervicornis Karny, 1930
4. Anabropsis costulata (Gorochov, 2001)
5. Anabropsis guangxiensis (Bian & Shi, 2015)
6. Anabropsis maculata Gorochov, 2021
7. Anabropsis minuta (Gorochov, 2001)
8. Anabropsis miser Bey-Bienko, 1968
9. Anabropsis multispinula Lu, Lin, Liu, Liang & Bian, 2022
10. Anabropsis paracostulata (Gorochov, 2010)
11. Anabropsis shii Lu, Lin, Liu, Liang & Bian, 2022
12. Anabropsis sinica Bey-Bienko, 1962
13. Anabropsis tarasovi Gorochov, 2021
14. Anabropsis tonkinensis Rehn, 1906

=== Carnabropsis ===
Auth.: Gorochov, 2021 - China, Vietnam

1. Anabropsis carnarius (Gorochov, 1998)
2. Anabropsis crenatis (Song, Bian & Shi, 2016)
3. Anabropsis guadun (Ingrisch, 2019)
4. Anabropsis incisa (Song, Bian & Shi, 2016)
5. Anabropsis infuscata (Wang, Liu & Li, 2015)
6. Anabropsis karnyi (Wang, Liu & Li, 2015)
7. Anabropsis parallela (Wang, Liu & Li, 2015)
8. Anabropsis pusilla (Ingrisch, 2019)
9. Anabropsis tenchongensis (Wang, Liu & Li, 2015)

=== Paterdecolyus ===
Auth.: Griffini, 1913 - India, Tibet

1. Anabropsis dubius (Würmli, 1973)
2. Anabropsis femoratus (Pictet & Saussure, 1893)
3. Anabropsis frater (Brunner von Wattenwyl, 1888)
4. Anabropsis magnimaculatus (Bian & Shi, 2019)
5. Anabropsis panteli (Griffini, 1913) (type)

=== Pteranabropsis ===
Auth.: Gorochov, 1988 - China, Vietnam

1. Anabropsis angusta (Ingrisch, 2019)
2. Anabropsis bavi (Ingrisch, 2019)
3. Anabropsis carli Griffini, 1911
4. Anabropsis copia (Ingrisch, 2019)
5. Anabropsis cuspis (Ingrisch, 2019)
6. Anabropsis falcata (Shi & Bian, 2016)
7. Anabropsis intermedia Gorochov, 2021

=== subgenus not assigned ===
- Anabropsis chopardi Karny, 1932 - Madagascar
- Anabropsis rehni Griffini, 1909 - central Africa
- Anabropsis tibetensis (Wang, Liu & Li, 2015) - Tibet
