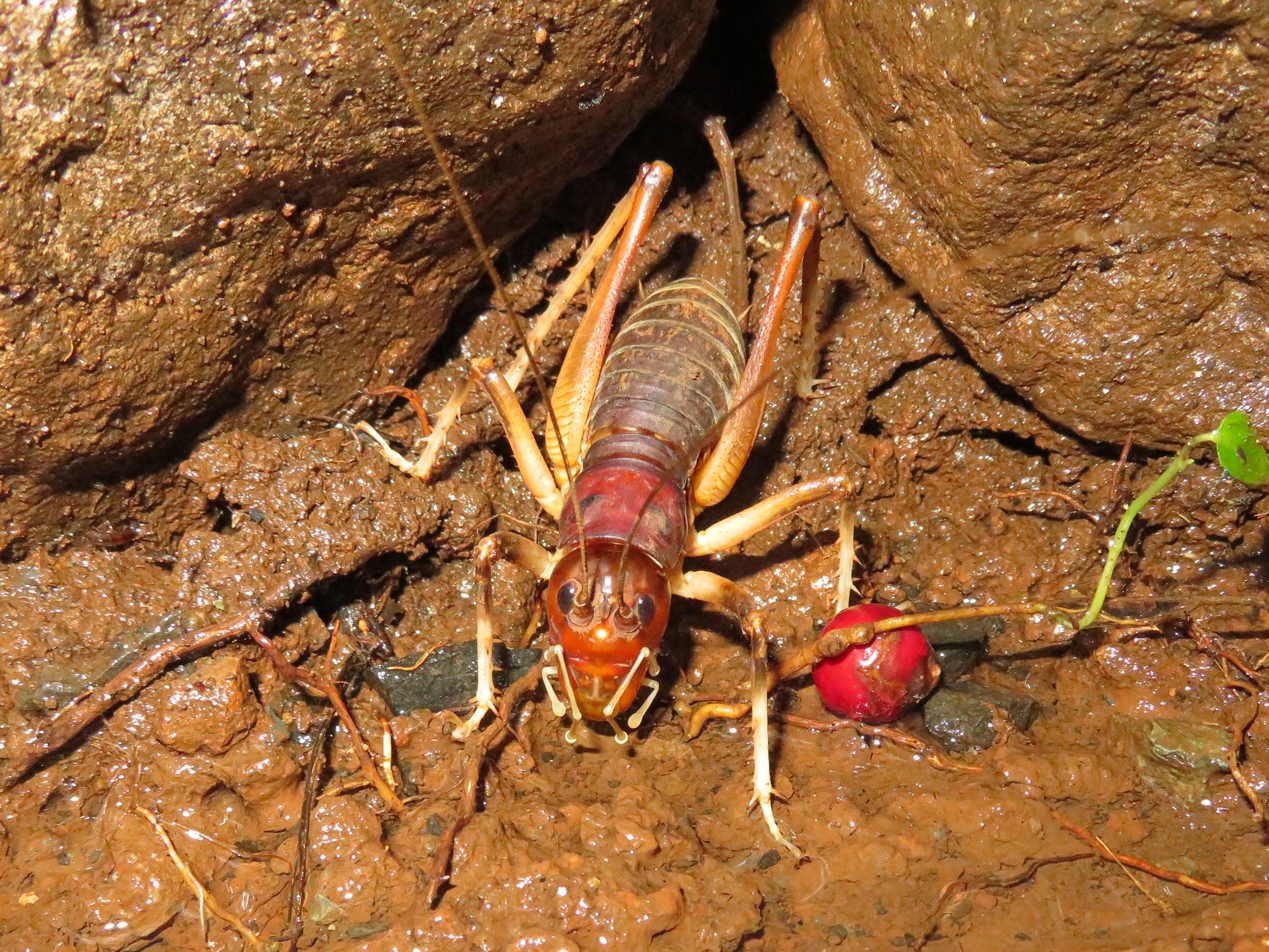
- female Anostostoma australasiae

Scientific classification
- Kingdom: Animalia
- Phylum: Arthropoda
- Clade: Pancrustacea
- Class: Insecta
- Order: Orthoptera
- Suborder: Ensifera
- Family: Anostostomatidae
- Subfamily: Anostostomatinae
- Genus: Anostostoma; Gray, 1837

Species
- See text.

Synonyms
- Anastoma Burmeister, 1840 (Lapsus calami); Anastostoma Burmeister, 1840 (Lapsus calami); Anostoma Burmeister, 1840 (Lapsus calami); Anostootoma Tepper, 1892 (Lapsus calami); Australostoma Karny, 1932

= Anostostoma =

Genus of orthopteran insects

Anostostoma is the type genus of the family Anostostomatidae and consists of five species of insect, endemic to Australia.

== Included species ==
- Anostostoma australasiae Gray, 1837
- Anostostoma erinaceum (Burmeister, 1838)
- Anostostoma femorale Walker, 1869
- Anostostoma opacum Brunner von Wattenwyl, 1888
- Anostostoma spinosum Karny, 1930

== Formerly included ==
- Stenopelmatus toltecus (Saussure, 1861)
