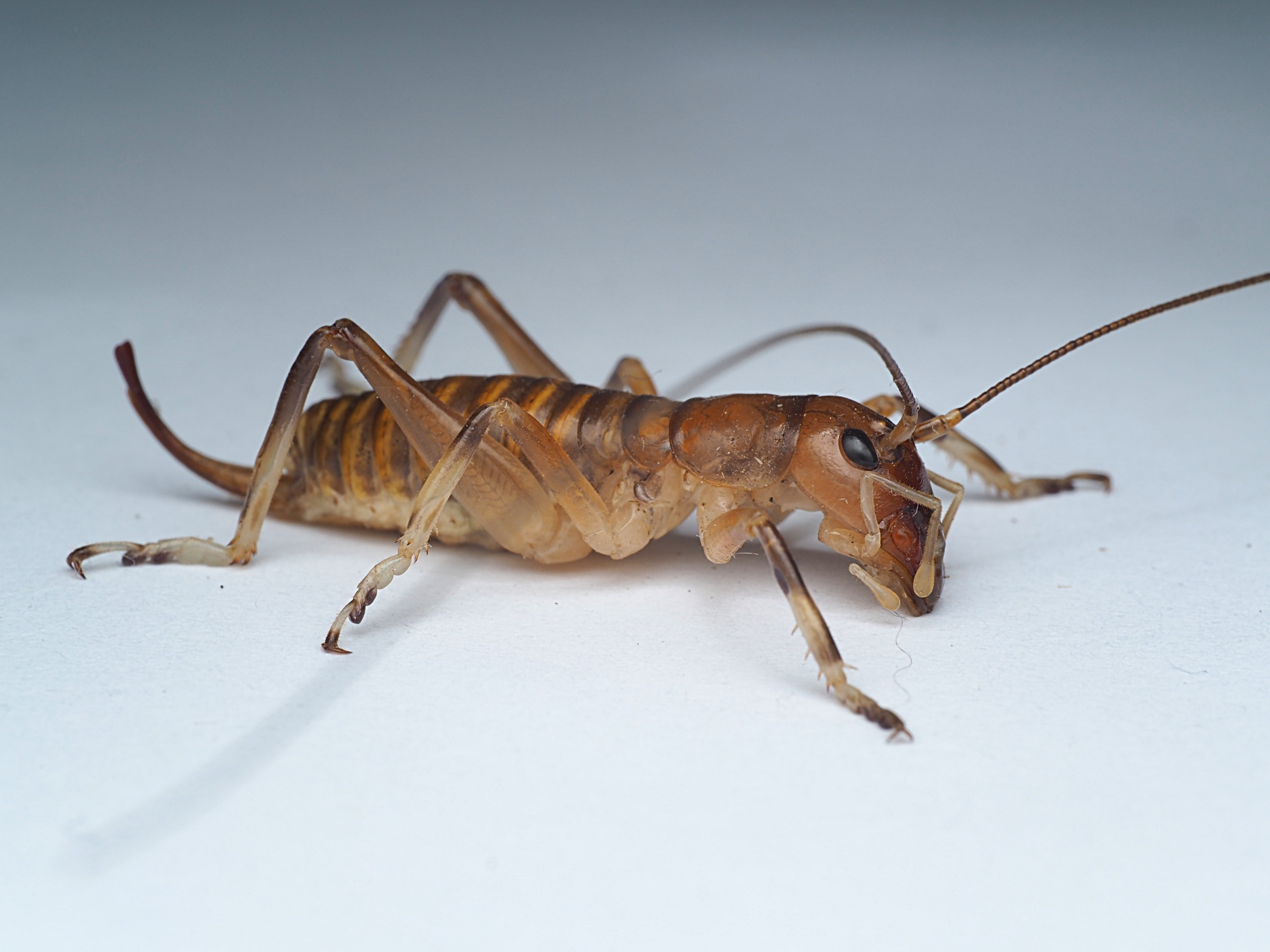
- Female
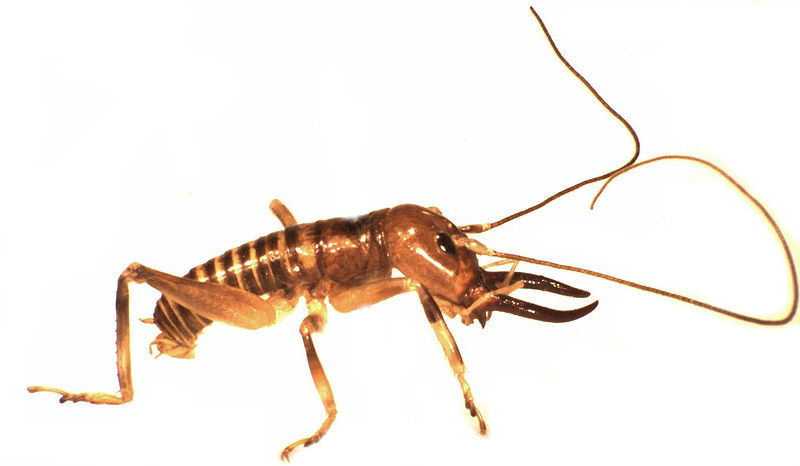
- Male

Conservation status
- Declining (NZ TCS)

Scientific classification
- Kingdom: Animalia
- Phylum: Arthropoda
- Clade: Pancrustacea
- Class: Insecta
- Order: Orthoptera
- Suborder: Ensifera
- Family: Anostostomatidae
- Genus: Anisoura; Ander, 1932
- Species: A. nicobarica

Binomial name
- Anisoura nicobarica Ander, 1932

Synonyms
- Hemiandrus monstrosus Salmon, 1950; Anisoura monstrosa (Salmon, 1950)

= Northland tusked wētā =

Species of orthopteran insect

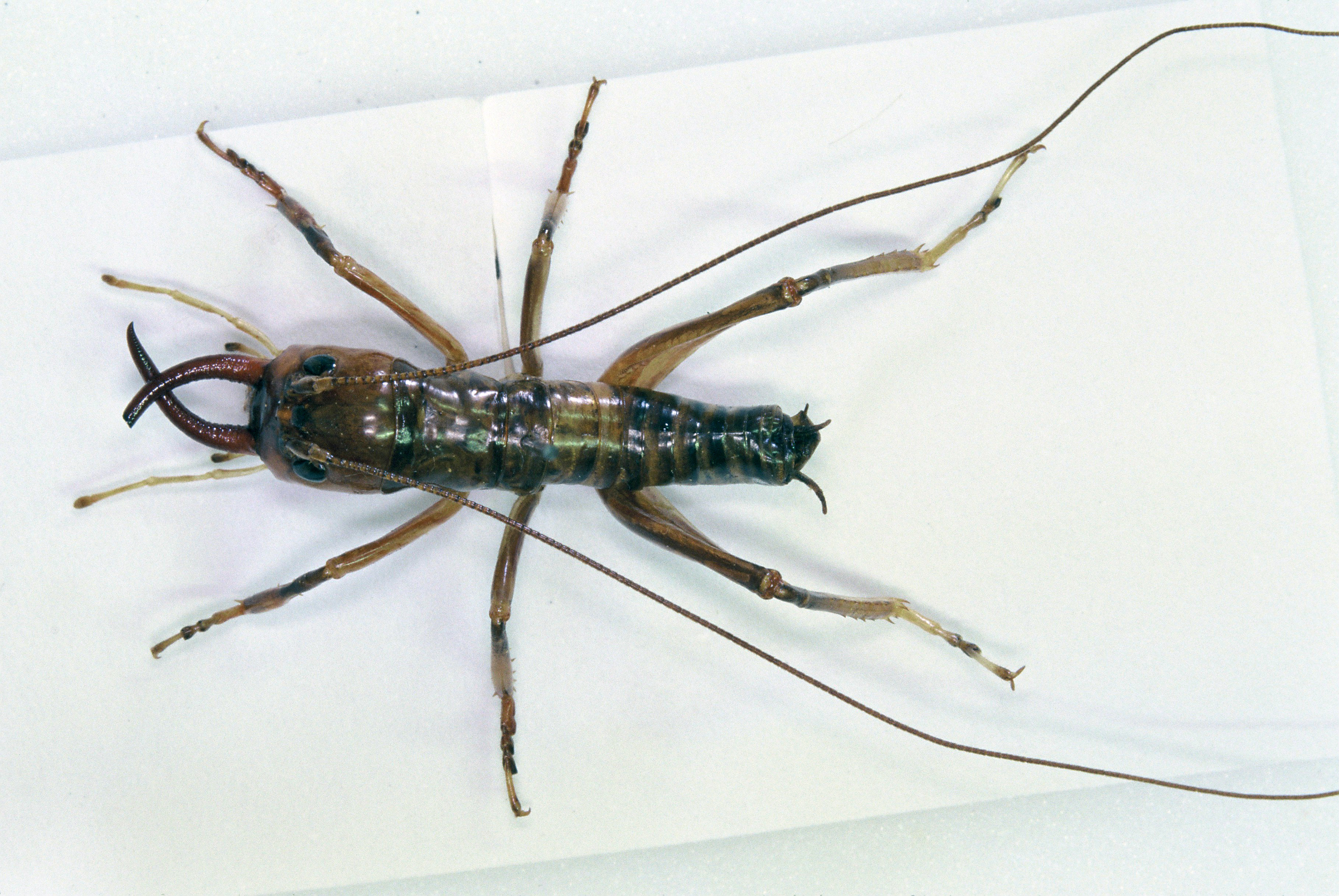
Northland tusked wētā (Anisoura nicobarica) in the entomology collection of the Museum of New Zealand Te Papa Tongarewa

The Northland tusked wētā, Anisoura nicobarica, is a rare monotypic wētā of the family Anostostomatidae, endemic to the northern half of Northland in New Zealand, and originally described in 1932. The type specimen was wrongly labelled as coming from the Nicobar Islands, so the species was named Anisoura nicobarica. It was erroneously described again in 1950 by a different author, who placed it in the ground wētā genus Hemiandrus (as Hemiandrus monstrosus).

== Description ==
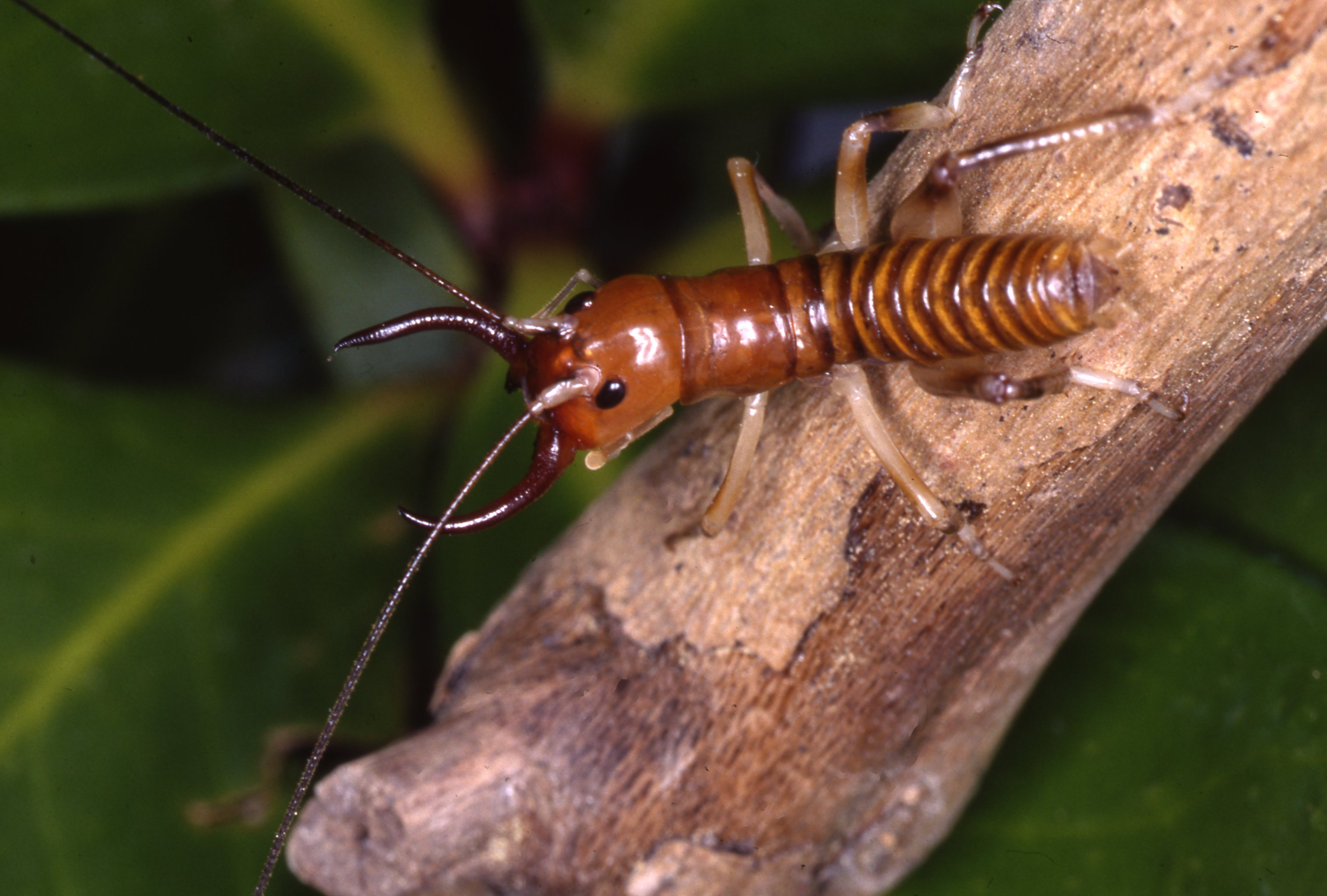
Adult male

Tusked wētā are distinctive because of the long curved "tusks" adult males have projecting forward from their jaws. The tusks are not used for biting but are used to push an opponent. Among the three species of tusked wētā, the Northland tusked wētā, Anisoura nicobarica is the smallest measuring up to 21 mm in body length. The Middle Island tusked wētā, Motuweta isolata, being the biggest measuring up to 70 mm in body length and the Raukumara tusked wētā, Motuweta riparia, is 30–40 mm long. The Northland tusked wētā is reddish brown and their hind tibia contains small spines. The tusks are devoid of stridulatory ridges, which are a feature of both M. isolata and A. nicobarica. Unlike ground wētā (Hemiandrus sp.), tusked wētā have ears on their front legs (fore-tibia).

== Habitat ==
The Northland tusked wētā is arboreal so needs native forest and scrub. Similar to the tree wētā, Hemideina thoracica, both species occupy holes (galleries) in mānuka and other trees and shrubs during the day. Unlike tree wētā, the tusked wētā makes a seal to close the hole entrance. Because the Northland tusked wētā hides in hollow branches and trunks of mānuka it is often found associated with firewood.

== Distribution and abundance ==
Anisoura nicobarica are endemic to the Far North of New Zealand. In 1948 a specimen was found at Orokawa Bay in the Bay of Islands. Most subsequent sightings have come from the Hokianga region. Most sightings involve only a single individual, making their abundance hard to determine. Northland tusked wētā are nocturnal and during the day they hide in tree holes and cover the entrance, making them hard to find.

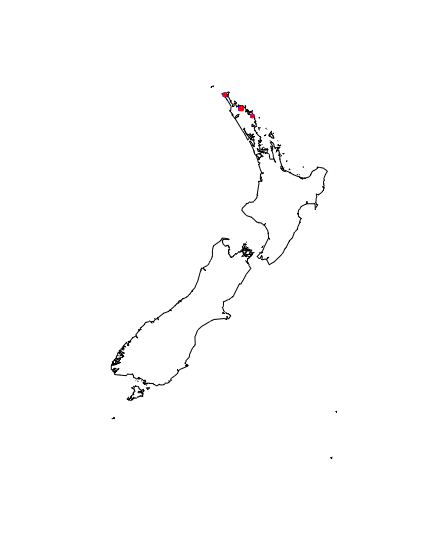
Mapped data collected from iNaturalist of A.nicobarica observations in New Zealand

== Diet ==
Like other tusked wētā species, the Northland tusked wētā prefers feeding on an animal diet consisting of live and dead insects and spiders.

== Behaviour ==
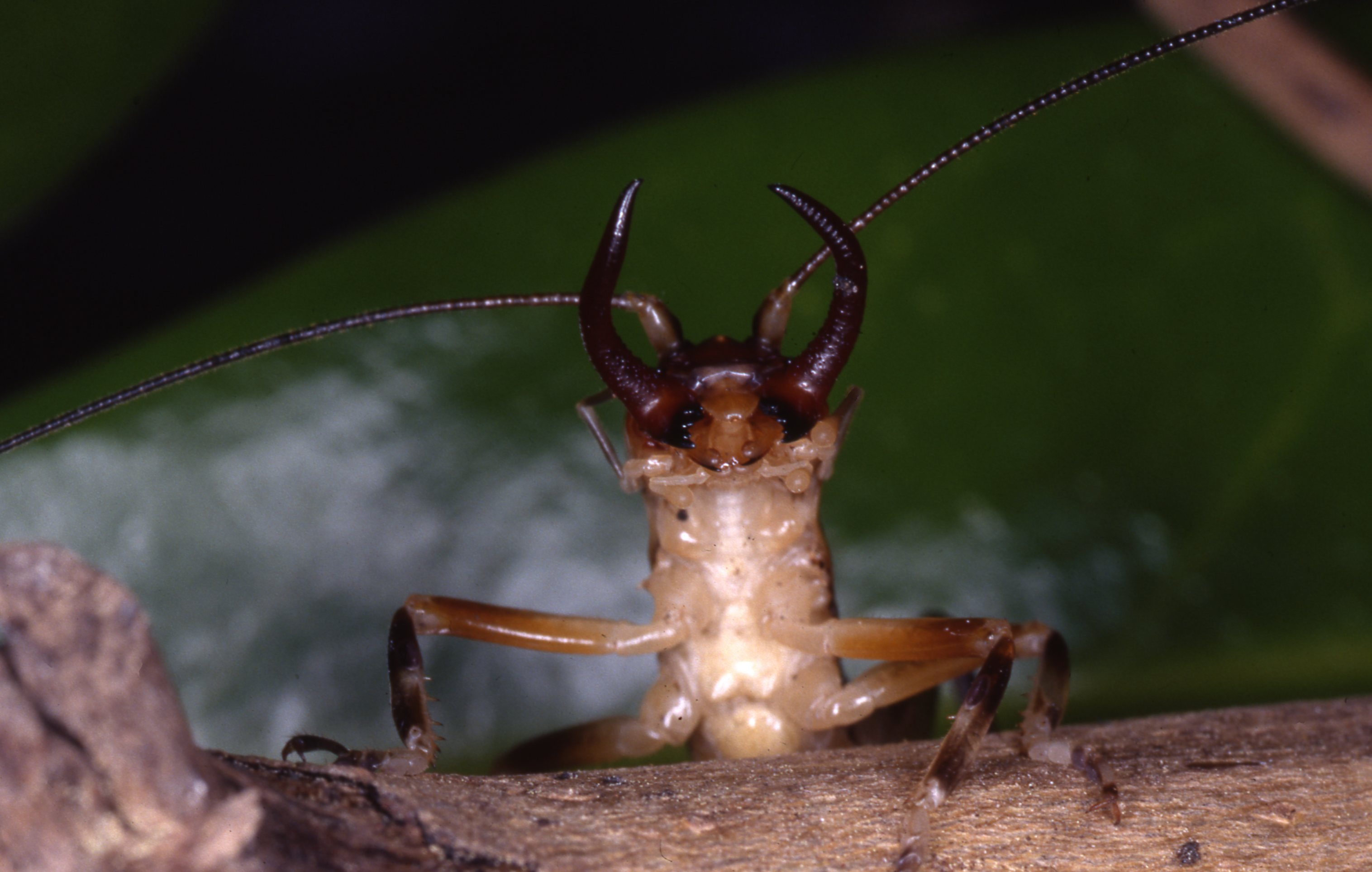
Male mandibles viewed from below

Anisoura nicobarica lives in tree holes (galleries), while the other two species of tusked wētā are ground burrowers, and all three face outward while occupying the retreat. As a defence tactic the tusked wētā orients itself to face the opening of its gallery with its jaws agape. They also mix their saliva with wood scrapings to seal the entrance of their gallery making the aperture almost invisible which is especially important during their moult. A captive A. nicobarica has been recorded creating a burrow in soil and roofing it with debris which suggests they can be flexible over their selection of refuges. When any of the tusked wētā are provoked further they display " mandible gape", "raise foreleg" and "raise head" which closely resemble a suit of components displayed by Hemideina species. According to Bellingham, M. (1991) during a field observation stated "when disturbed, they raised their tusks slightly, rasping them together. The body was curved sideways with the front and head elevated. The hind legs were not raised. The weta also made short lunges forward attempting to use its tusks as pincers. When disturbed further, by blowing or tapping lightly on its head, the weta jumped away haphazardly".

== Conservation status ==
Under the New Zealand Threat Classification System, this species is listed as "Declining" with the qualifiers of "Biologically Sparse", "Data Poor: Size", "Data Poor Trend" and "Population Fragmentation". The decline is due to habitat loss. In earlier reports, it was classified as "Relict".
