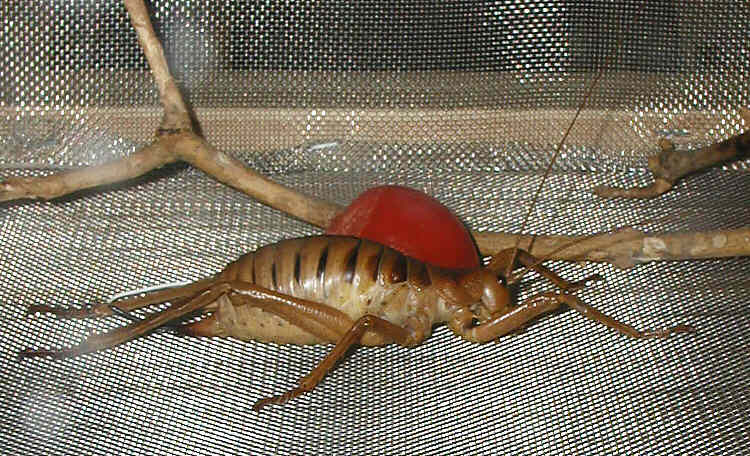
- Poor Knights giant wētā, Deinacrida fallai Overall length 20 cm (8 in)

Scientific classification
- Kingdom: Animalia
- Phylum: Arthropoda
- Clade: Pancrustacea
- Class: Insecta
- Order: Orthoptera
- Suborder: Ensifera
- Superfamily: Stenopelmatoidea
- Family: Anostostomatidae; Saussure, 1859

Subfamilies and genera
- See text

= Anostostomatidae =

Family of cricket-like animals

Anostostomatidae is a family of insects in the order Orthoptera, widely distributed in the southern hemisphere. It is named Mimnermidae or Henicidae in some taxonomies, and common names include king crickets in Australia and South Africa, and wētā in New Zealand (although not all wētā are in Anostostomatidae). Prominent members include the Parktown prawn of South Africa, and the giant wētā of New Zealand.

== General characteristics ==
Some members of this family can be quite large: Parktown prawn can exceed 6 cm and tree weta can exceed 8 cm in length.

Some Australian and Asian anostostomatids have wings (e.g. Exogryllacris, Gryllotaurus, Transaevum), while most lack wings (e.g. Anostostoma, Hypocophoides, Penalva).

Males of some species have highly modified heads, which they use in male-male conflicts.

== Diet ==
The wētā of New Zealand, such as Hemideina, are mostly herbivores that feed on leaves, fruit and flowers, but may also scavenge recently killed invertebrates. The ground wētā Anderus maculifrons eats a range of forest invertebrates.

The king crickets of Australia include generalised scavengers that consume various dead and decaying matter, specialised feeders (e.g. Exogryllacris feeds on fungal fruiting bodies growing on fallen trees) and predators of other invertebrates. There is a record of an Australian king cricket preying on a funnel-web spider.

== Behaviour ==
Anostostomatidae are nocturnal. They generally become active soon after sunset.

Anostostomatidae communicate with sound, both through the air and as ground waves through soil, wood and sand. Adults of both sexes and also nymphs can produce sound. These crickets hear sound using foretibial tympana or other modifications to the tibiae, tarsi and perhaps prothorax.

As one example, Anostostoma can stridulate by rubbing its abdomen against its hind legs. The sides of the base of the abdomen have dense patches of short, sharp pegs, and there are similar pegs on the inner surfaces of the hind femurs. Sound is produced by these pegs rubbing together.

Anostostomatidae use various behaviours to defend against predators. Many hide in burrows during the day to avoid diurnal predators. If disturbed by a predator, they may jump away, stridulate, eject putrid-smelling faeces, bite, fly away (done by winged Exogryllacris and Gryllotaurus) or jump into water (done by Transaevum nymphs, which feed on streamsides).

== Life cycle ==
Like other orthopterans, Anostostomatidae go through the three stages of egg, nymph and adult. Life cycles in this family are often long, with egg development taking up to 18 months, nymphal development taking 1–3 years and involving 7-10 instars, and adults living for a year or more. Adult females may brood eggs and young nymphs in isolated chambers.

Chilean king cricket, Cratomelus sp.

== Taxonomy and evolution ==
At least one Cretaceous fossil of an anostostomatid-like cricket is known from Australia but has not been described. The modern distribution of this family in the southern hemisphere has led to speculation that members of this group owe their distribution to the breakup of the ancient supercontinent Gondwana. This may be the case but evidence for the large scale if not total submergence of continental crust in the New Zealand and New Caledonian region in the Oligocene, indicates the possibility that wētā have arrived in these locations since re-emergence of land. The fact that anostostomatid crickets also occur on some Japanese islands supports this possibility.

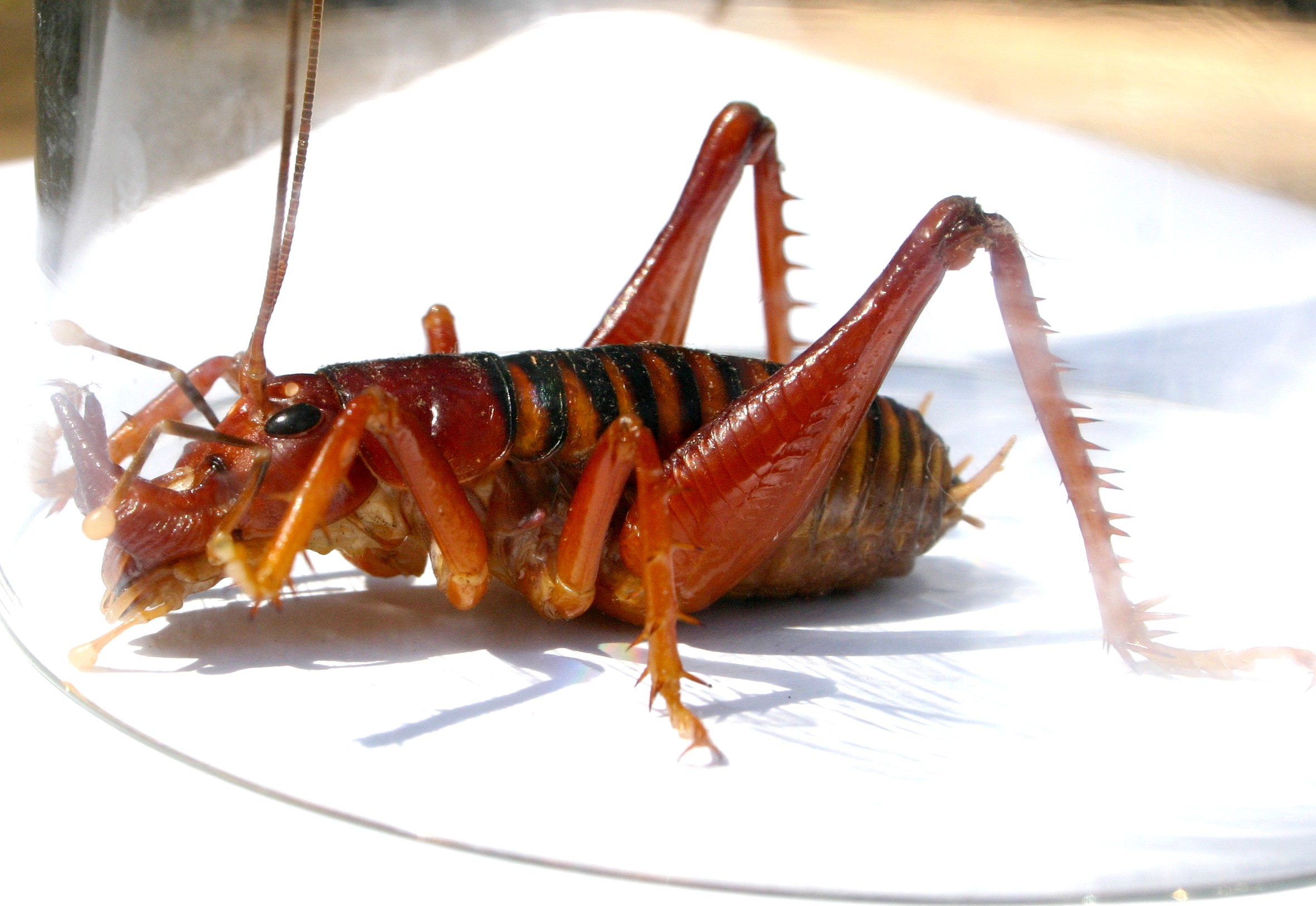
Male Libanasidus vittatus

=== Subfamilies and genera ===
The Orthoptera Species File lists the following;

==== Anabropsinae ====
Auth.: Rentz & Weissman, 1973 – Americas, Africa, India, E. Asia, Australasia

- tribe Anabropsini Rentz & Weissman, 1973
  - Anabropsis Rehn, 1901 (includes subgenera Paterdecolyus Griffini, 1913, Apteranabropsis and Pteranabropsis Gorochov, 1988)
  - Exogryllacris Willemse, 1963: monotypic E. ornata Willemse, 1963 - Australia
  - Melanabropsis Wang & Liu, 2020 - China, Japan
- tribe Brachyporini Gorochov, 2001 - Southern Africa, Australia
  - Brachyporus Brunner von Wattenwyl, 1888
  - Penalva Walker, 1870

==== Anostostomatinae ====
Auth.: Saussure, 1859 – Africa (including Madagascar), Australia, New Zealand

- Anostostoma
- Bochus
- Borborothis
- Carcinopsis
- Gryllotaurus
- Henicus Gray, 1837
- Libanasidus, king crickets
- Motuweta, tusked wētā
- Nasidius Stål, 1876
- Onosandridus
- Onosandrus
- Spizaphilus

==== Cratomelinae ====
Auth.: Brunner von Wattenwyl, 1888 – South America

- Cratomelus Blanchard, 1851

==== Deinacridinae ====
Auth.: Karny, 1932 – New Zealand

- Deinacrida, giant wētā
- Hemideina, tree wētā

==== Leiomelinae ====
Auth.: Gorochov, 2011 – S. America

- Leiomelus Ander, 1936

==== Lezininae ====
Auth.: Karny, 1932 – N. Africa, Middle East

- Lezina Walker, 1869

==== Lutosinae ====
Auth.: Gorochov, 1988 – Central & S. America, Africa, PNG

- Apotetamenus Brunner von Wattenwyl, 1888
- Hydrolutos Issa & Jaffe, 1999
- Libanasa Walker, 1869
- Licodia Walker, 1869
- Lutosa Walker, 1869
- Neolutosa Gorochov, 2001
- Papuaistus Griffini, 1911
- Rhumosa Hugel & Desutter-Grandcolas, 2018

==== Subfamily not assigned ====
- tribe Glaphyrosomatini Rentz & Weissman, 1973
  - Cnemotettix Caudell, 1916
  - Glaphyrosoma Brunner von Wattenwyl, 1888
- incertae sedis
  - Aistus Brunner von Wattenwyl, 1888
  - Anisoura Ander, 1932 – monotypic Northland tusked wētā: A. nicobarica Ander, 1932
  - Coccinellomima Karny, 1932 – monotypic C. shelfordi Karny, 1932
  - Dolichochaeta Philippi, 1863 – monotypic D. longicornis Philippi, 1863
  - Gryllacropsis Brunner von Wattenwyl, 1888 – monotypic (India) G. magniceps (Walker, 1870)
  - Hemiandrus Ander, 1938 - ground wētā
  - Hypocophoides Karny, 1930
  - Hypocophus Brunner von Wattenwyl, 1888
  - Leponosandrus Gorochov, 2001 – monotypic L. lepismoides (Walker, 1871)
  - Transaevum Johns, 1997 – monotypic T. laudatum Johns, 1997

=== King crickets of South Africa ===
The best-known species is the Parktown prawn, not to be confused with the well-known Koringkrieke or armoured ground crickets, which never have been in the family Anostostomatidae.

Henicus monstrosus is a nocturnal anostostomatid. The males are unusual in their anatomy; their heads are disproportionately large and bear forward-directed prongs. They have extremely long, curved mandibles that are functional, but seem to play no part in the eating process.

=== Wētā of New Zealand ===
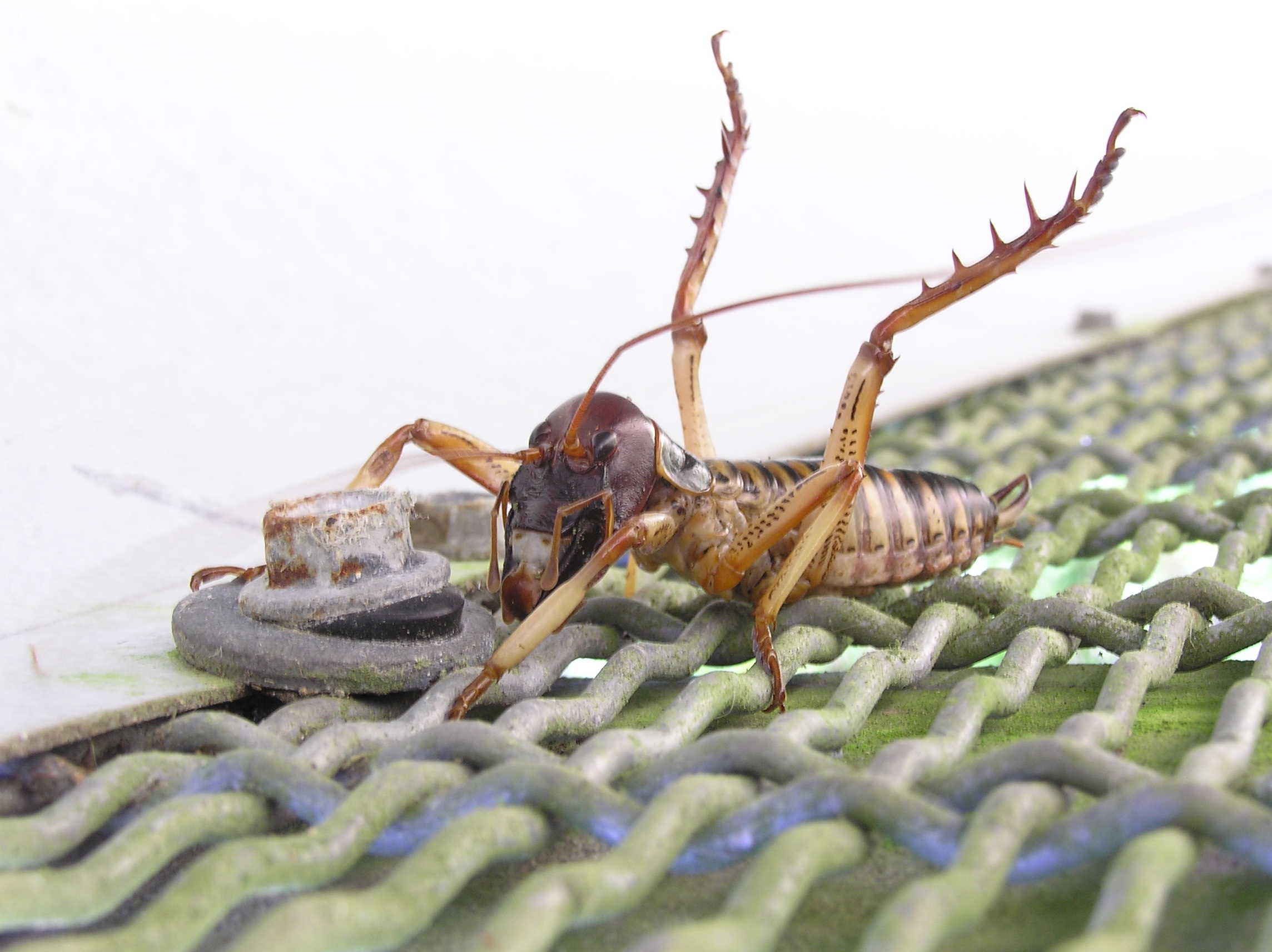
Defensive male Wellington tree wētā

Six genera of New Zealand wētā are part of the family Anostostomatidae:

- Giant wētā (Deinacrida)
- Ground wētā (Hemiandrus & Anderus)
- Northland tusked wētā (Anisoura)
- Tree wētā (Hemideina)
- Tusked wētā (Motuweta)

The cave wētā species belong to a different family, the Rhaphidophoridae.

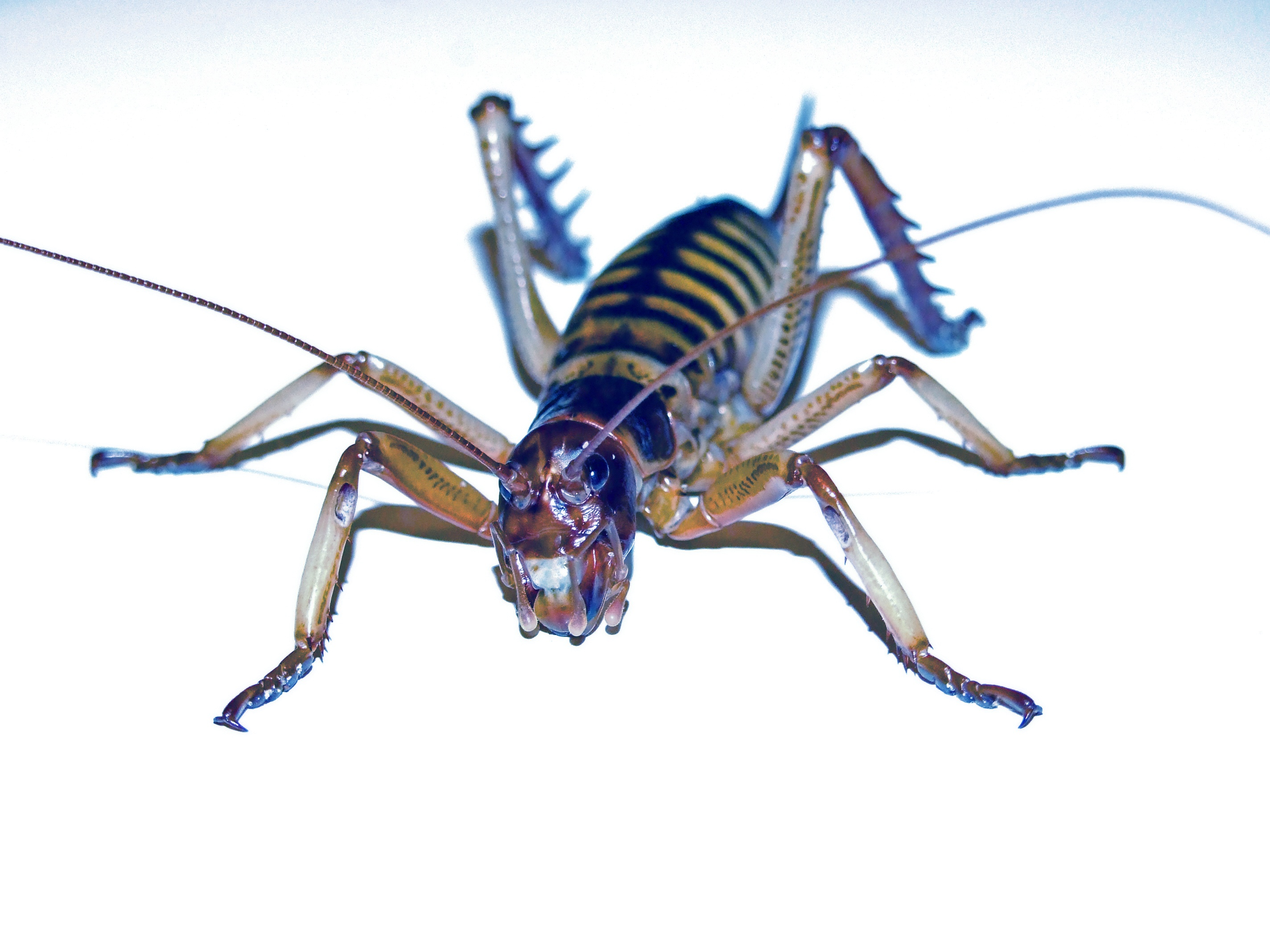
Tree wētā

== Literature ==
- Elizabeth Pennisi (2017). "Saving the 'god of ugly things': New Zealand battles to bring back its rodent-sized insects". Science. doi:10.1126/science.aan6940.
- Johns, P.M. 1997: The Gondwanaland weta: family Anostostomatidae (formerly in Stenopelmatidae, Henicidae or Mimnermidae): nomenclatural problems, world checklist, new genera and species. Journal of Orthoptera Research, 6: 125–138. ISSN 1082-6467, JSTOR 3503546
