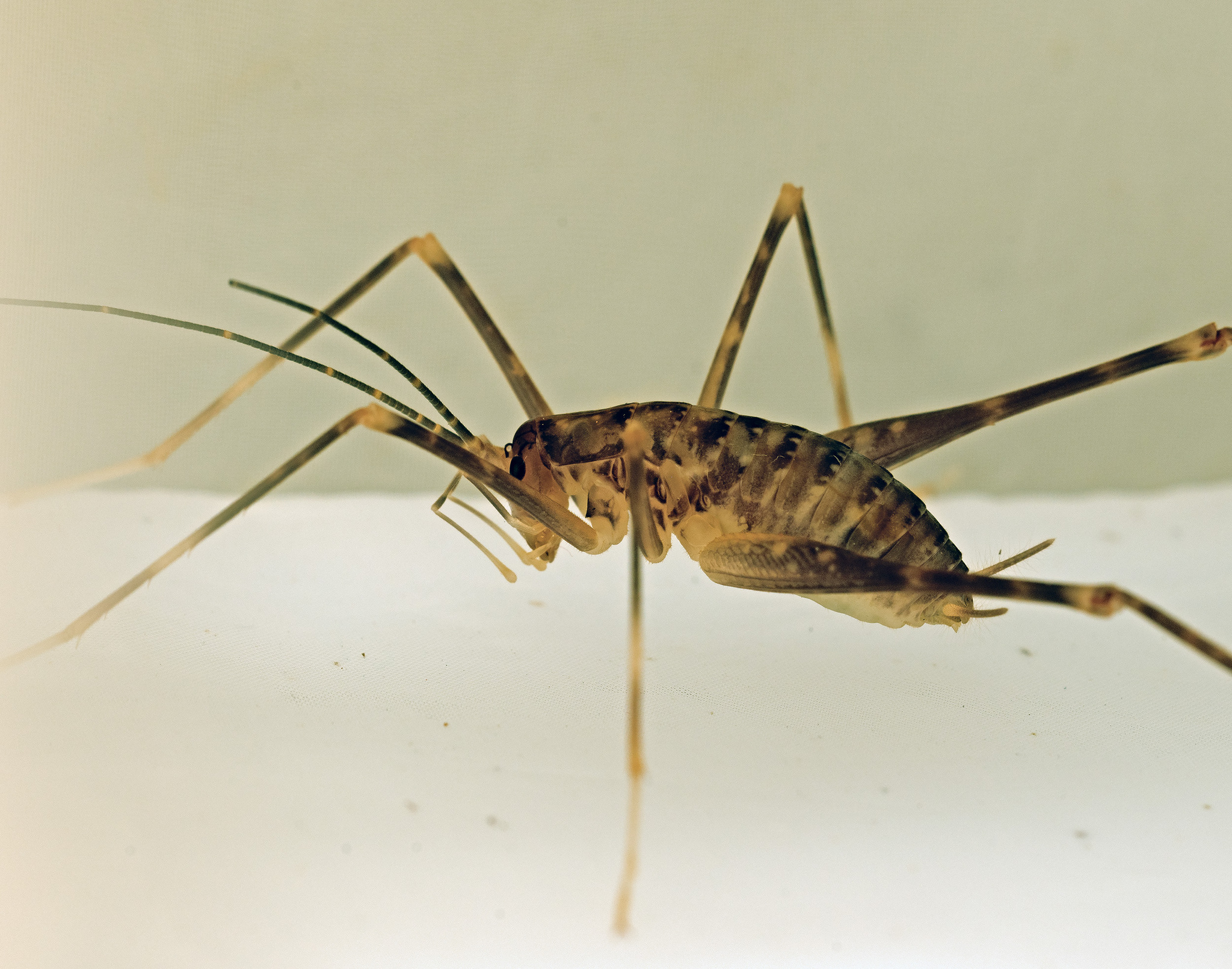

Conservation status
- Vulnerable (IUCN 2.3)

Scientific classification
- Kingdom: Animalia
- Phylum: Arthropoda
- Clade: Pancrustacea
- Class: Insecta
- Order: Orthoptera
- Suborder: Ensifera
- Family: Rhaphidophoridae
- Subfamily: Macropathinae
- Tribe: Macropathini
- Genus: Tasmanoplectron; Richards, 1971
- Species: T. isolatum

Binomial name
- Tasmanoplectron isolatum Richards, 1971
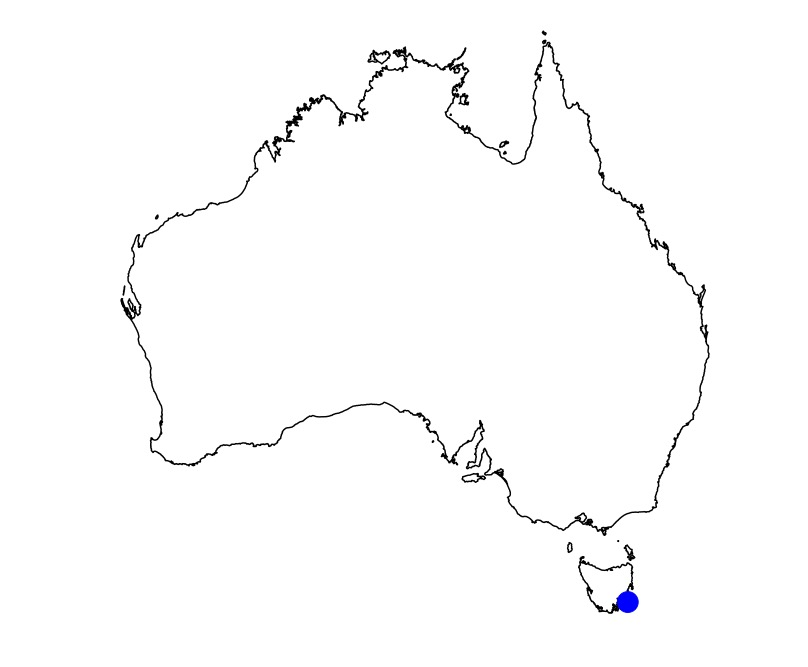
- Observations of Tasmanoplectron isolatum from iNaturalist (as of August, 2023).

= Tasmanoplectron =

Species of insect

Tasmanoplectron isolatum is a rare nocturnal species of cave cricket, and is the only species represented in the genus Tasmanoplectron, belonging to the family Rhaphidophoridae. In 1971, Aola M. Richards was first to describe this species in Tasmania, Australia, where its geographical distribution is restricted to. The genus is thought to have affinities with New Zealand fauna due to its marked differences from the other Australian Rhaphidophoridae.

== Distribution and habitat ==
Tasmanoplectron isolatum is endemic to Tasman Island off the southeast coast of Tasmania, Australia. This small long-legged insect seeks refuge among rocks, forming small artificial cavities, or in bird burrows. On Tasman Island, the species has been collected from Allocasuarinas (she-oak) forest and from old drains in buildings.

== Morphology ==
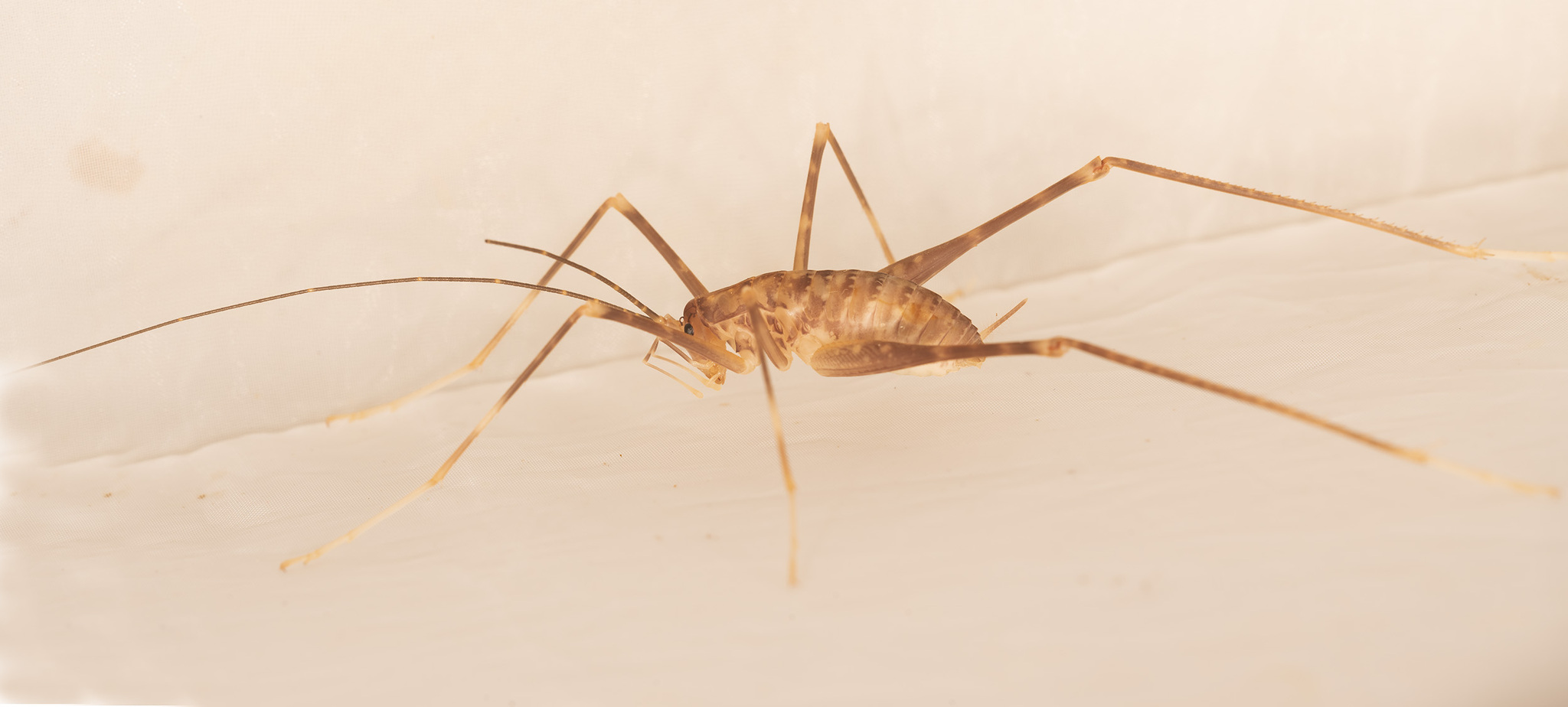
Tasmanoplectron isolatum

Tasmanoplectron isolatum is predominantly brown-coloured, except for the ovipositor being light reddish brown, and it is fully thickly covered by setae. The body size of T. isolatum ranges from 18 to 21 millimetres, and males are usually slightly larger than females. It possesses long filiform antennae as well as long slender legs. Fore and middle legs are of the same length, and are 2.5 times longer than the body, whereas hind legs are 3.8 times longer than the body.

== Taxonomy ==
Tasmanoplectron isolatum is believed to be more closely related to at least nine genera existing in New Zealand and subantarctic islands (e.g. Insulanoplectron) than those existing in Australia, due to similarities in leg spination and external genitalia. However, T. isolatum possesses four unique characteristics which explain why it is the sole member of the genus Tasmanoplectron:

- the second segment of hind tarsus has either reduced or no apical spines,
- the ventral valves of ovipositor distally have a row of spines,
- pseudosternite of males is elongated, and
- abdominal styli are located at the ventral and distal portion of the genital plate of males.
