= Cavernotettix =

Scientific classification
- Kingdom: Animalia
- Phylum: Arthropoda
- Class: Insecta
- Order: Orthoptera
- Suborder: Ensifera
- Family: Rhaphidophoridae
- Subfamily: Macropathinae
- Genus: Cavernotettix; Richards, 1966

Species
- Cavernotettix buchanesis Richards, 1966; Cavernotettix craggiensis Richards, 1974; Cavernotettix flindersensis (Chopard, 1944); Cavernotettix montanus Richards, 1966; Cavernotettix wyanbenensis Richards, 1966

Genus of Australian cave cricket

Cavernotettix is a genus of cave crickets in the family Rhaphidophoridae, in South-Eastern Australia and Tasmania. There are five species in the genus Cavernotettix. The genus was first described by New Zealand entomologist Aola Richards in 1966.

Cavernotettix species are mostly found in cool dark damp spaces such as limestone caves, wombat burrows and walls of old sheds. They usually appear in cave entrances at twilight, and are sensitive to temperature changes and require a high degree of humidity to survive.

== Morphology ==
All species in the genus Cavernotettix have bodies covered by short setae. They have long and slender legs. Their antennae are very long and tapering which almost touch at their bases.

The body length of Cavernotettix craggiensis is 17–18 mm (0.67–0.71 in) (males) and 17–19 mm (0.67–0.75 in) (females). It has a distinctive brown colour that extends across the body. The ventral valve of the ovipositor is armed with 8 small teeth gradually reducing in size. Fore and middle legs are sub-equal long, while hind legs are 1.9 times longer.

== Distribution ==
Most species in the genus Cavernotettix are found on mainland Australia, but two species are also found on islands in Bass Strait (between Tasmania and Australia). As cave crickets have no wings, Richards suggested that Cavernotettix was more likely to have reached Tasmania via a land bridge during Pleistocene rather than via strong winds.

- Cavernotettix craggiensis is found under boulders and in burrows of breeding seabirds on just one Island; Craggy Island. This species is endemic to Tasmania.
- Cavernotettix flindersensis was found by French entomologist Lucien Chopard in Flinders Island in 1944. It was first under the genus Speleotettix. However, based on its characteristics is closer to Cavernotettix, Richards put it under the genus Cavernotettix. This species is also found on Cape Barren Island in Bass Strait.

== Conservation status ==
=== Cavernotettix craggiensis ===
According to Threatened Species Protection Act 1995, Tasmania government has listed Cavernotettix craggiensis as a threatened species. Illegal collection, natural predation and climate change are threatening the population of Cavernotettix craggiensis.
