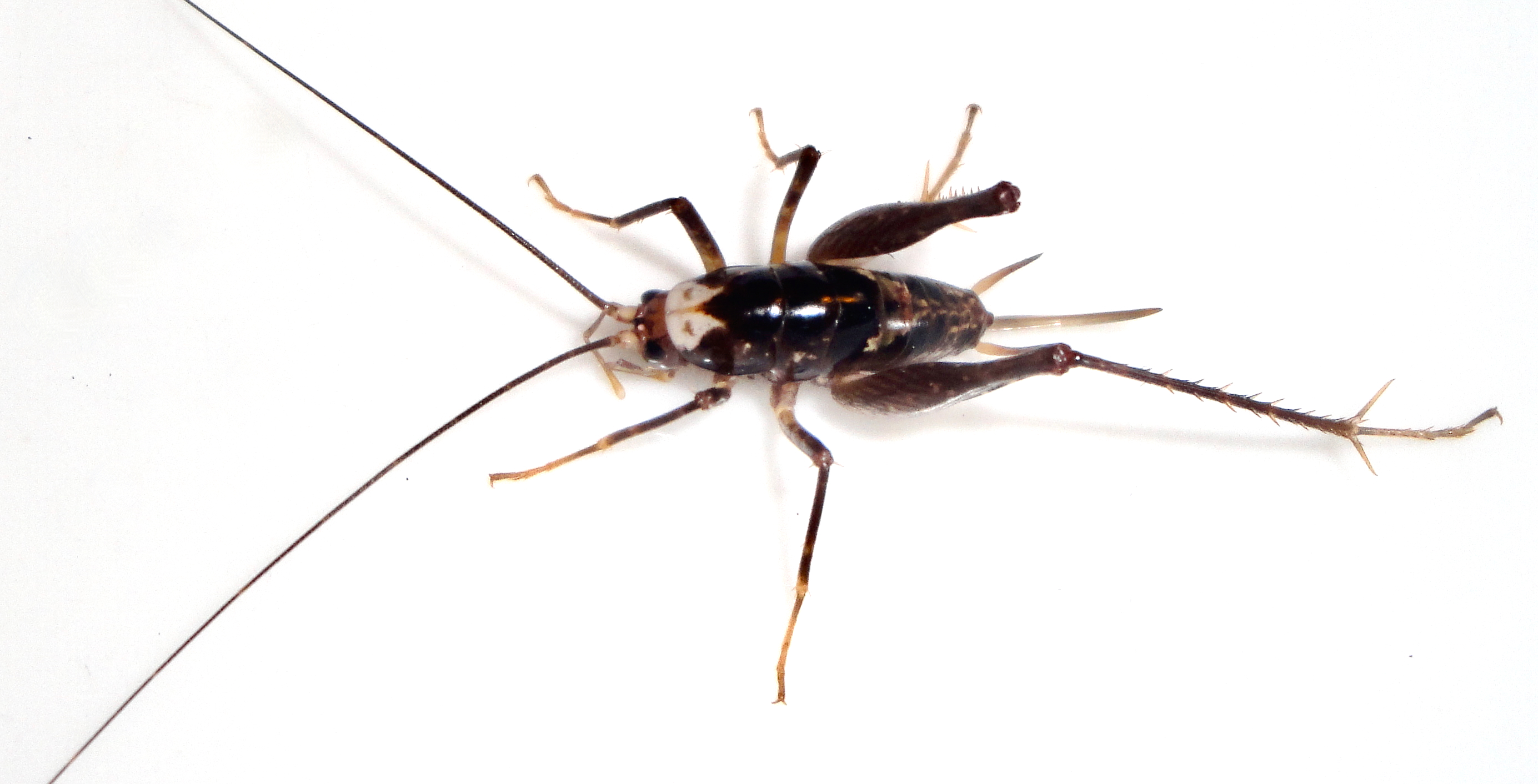

Scientific classification
- Kingdom: Animalia
- Phylum: Arthropoda
- Clade: Pancrustacea
- Class: Insecta
- Order: Orthoptera
- Suborder: Ensifera
- Family: Rhaphidophoridae
- Subfamily: Macropathinae
- Genus: Occultastella; Trewick, 2024
- Species: O. morgana

Binomial name
- Occultastella morgana Trewick, 2024

= Occultastella =

Monotypic genus of orthopteran insects

Occultastella is a monotypic genus of tokoriro (cave wētā) in the family Rhaphidophoridae. The sole member of this genus, Occultastella morgana, was described in 2024, and is endemic to New Zealand.

== Etymology ==
The genus name is based on two Latin words, occulta (hidden), referencing the secretive nature of the genus, and stella (star), referencing the pale, flame-shaped markings on the head of Occultastella morgana. The species epithet morgana is a reference to New Zealand researcher Mary Morgan-Richards, who has made significant contributions to the understanding of New Zealand tokoriro (cave wētā).

== Taxonomy and morphology ==
The genus Occultastella and species Occultastella morgana were described by Steven A. Trewick in 2024. Occultastella is sister to the Rhaphidophoridae species endemic to the Snares Islands (Insulanoplectron spinosum). These nocturnal crickets are wingless and silent. Occultastella morgana is approximately 11 mm (0.43 in) in length, with its antennae being longer than its body. Occultastella morgana is typically dark brown to black in colour. The head of the species has a distinctive cream/white candle flame marking on each side of the midline of the pronotum.

== Distribution ==
Occultastella morgana was originally found in the coal seam soils of the Denniston Plateau in the West Coast Region of the South Island of New Zealand, during a BioBlitz organised in 2012 by Forest & Bird to highlight the threat to the Plateau by the Escarpment Mine Project. It can also be found in the northwestern South Island, including Kahurangi National Park and the Westport area. Trewick was surprised to find a new genus on the Denniston Plateau, due to the history of coal mining and its effects on the local ecosystem.
