= Manaia River =

River in New Zealand

Coordinates: 36.8465°S 175.472689°E

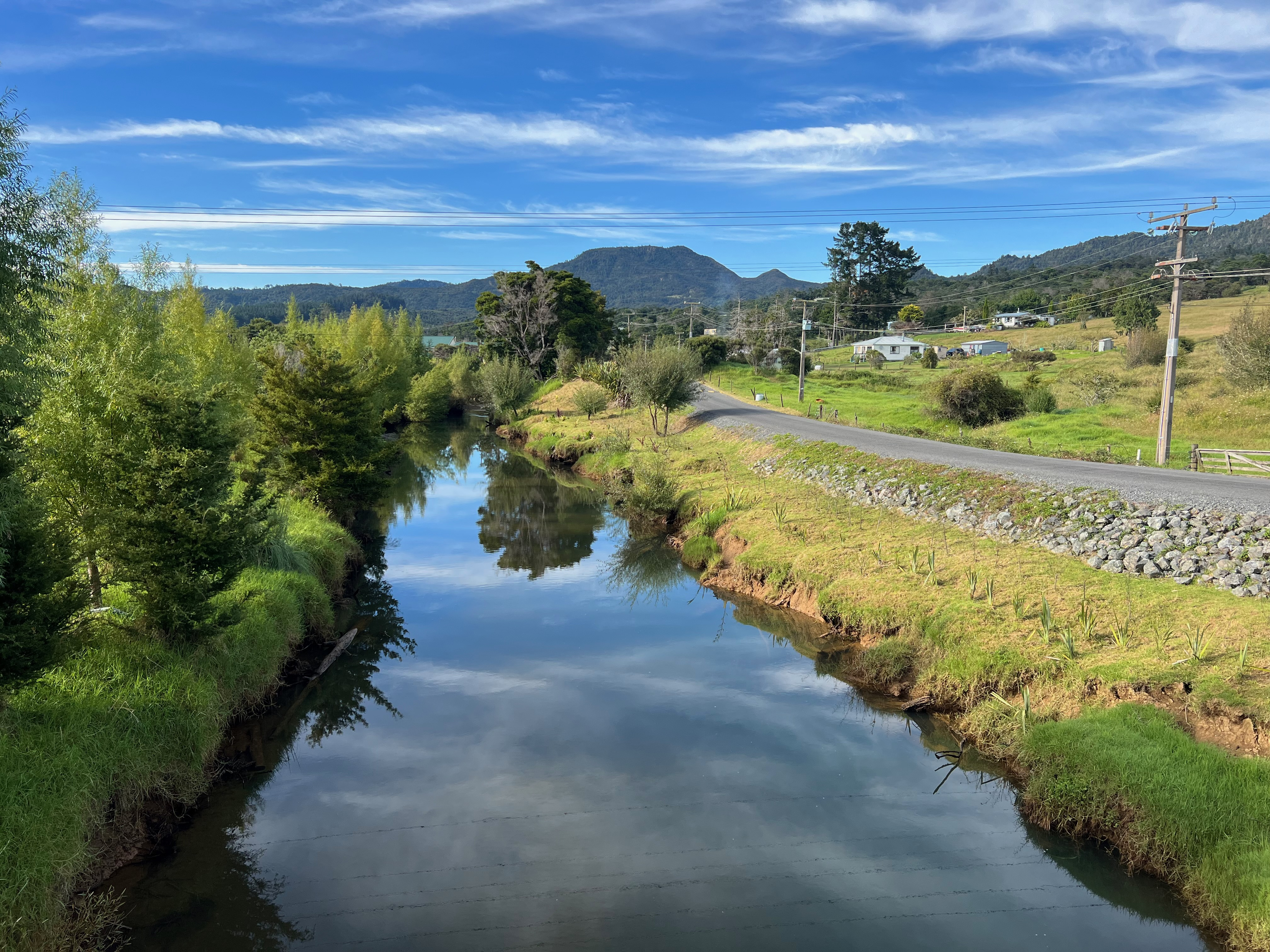
- Manaia River and Marae Rd

Location
- Country: New Zealand

Physical characteristics
- Source
  - location: Kakatarahae Coromandel Range
  - elevation: 725 m (2,379 ft)
- Mouth
  - location: Hauraki Gulf
- Length: 12 km (7.5 mi)
- Basin size: 47.95 km^{2} (18.51 sq mi)

The Manaia River is a river of the Coromandel Peninsula in New Zealand's North Island. It flows north from its sources in the Coromandel Range, reaching the Hauraki Gulf at Manaia Harbour, 10 kilometres (6 mi) southwest of Coromandel.

The Manaia catchment is nationally and internationally significant for biodiversity. Most of the rocks in the lower parts of the catchment are Cretaceous greywacke of the Manaia Hill Group, with Miocene andesite forming most of the uplands. Well-draining brown soils, formed mostly from andesite, cover most of the basin. Native bush covers 72.6% of the area, with mānuka and kānuka covering another 19%, so that water quality is good.

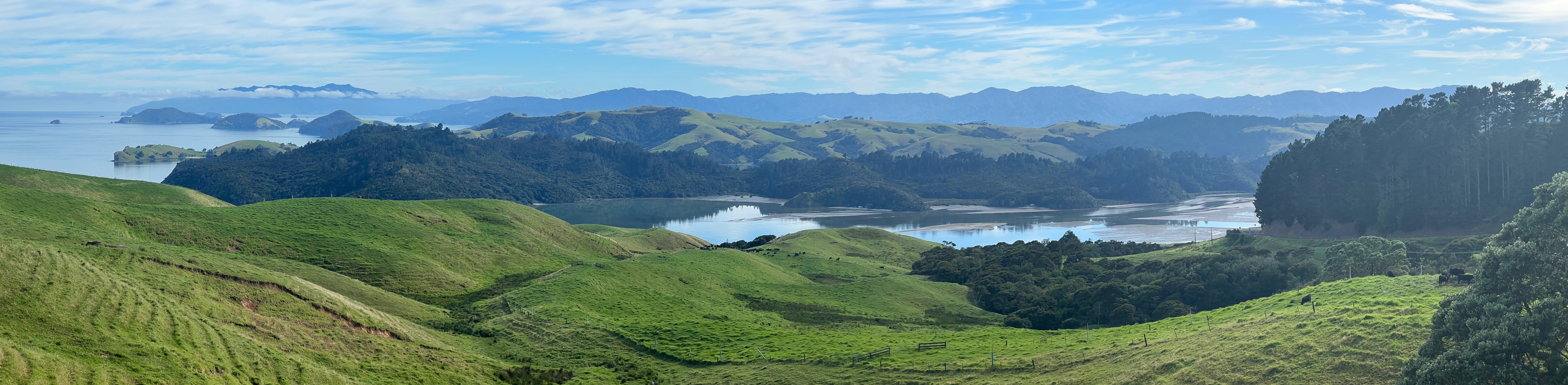
Manaia Harbour from SH25 summit

Due to siltation of the harbour, following extensive logging in the last century, mangroves increased by 195% from 1971 to 1995. In 1890 the Kauri Timber Company built 3 dams to drive the logs downstream and between 1885 and 1901 9.2 kg (20 lb) of gold was dug from Leading Wind and Golden Hill mines. One of the kauri dams is still marked on the map.

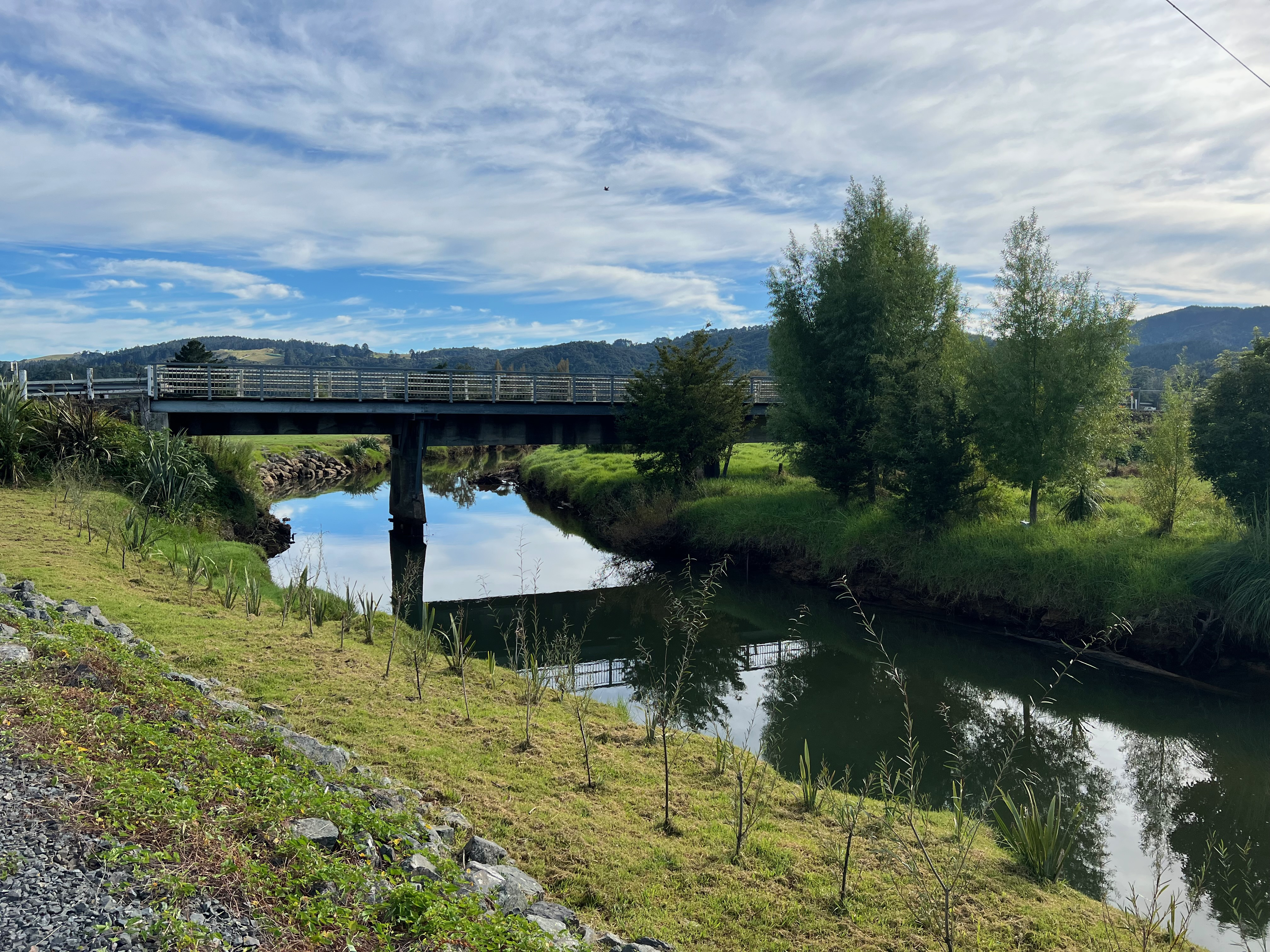
Manaia bridge opened in 1913

The single-lane SH25 bridge over the river opened in 1913.

== Manaia Forest Sanctuary ==
In 1970 Waipoua Preservation Society, local artist, Rei Hamon, and Forest & Bird's Auckland Branch campaigned to protect the kauri being felled in the northern headwaters of the river. As a result, in February 1971, the Minister of Forests Duncan MacIntyre announced the end of all kauri milling at Manaia and the protection of a forest sanctuary. The 482 ha (1,190 acres) Manaia Forest Sanctuary has over 400 kauri trees and 129 species of plant have been identified. It is the only remaining stand of mature mid altitude kauri in Coromandel, with trees up to 2,500 years old. Species in the Sanctuary include Coromandel striped gecko (toropuku), Hochstetter’s and Archey’s frogs, forest ringlet butterfly (pepe pouri), painted cave weta, longfin eel (tuna), kokopu, kākā, North Island brown kiwi, kererū, tūī, korimako, pīwakawaka, miromiro, silvereye, riroriro, kōtare, ruru and pīpīwharauroa.

== See also ==
- Manaia, Waikato
- List of rivers of New Zealand
