= Setascutum =

Scientific classification
- Kingdom: Animalia
- Phylum: Arthropoda
- Clade: Pancrustacea
- Class: Insecta
- Order: Orthoptera
- Suborder: Ensifera
- Family: Rhaphidophoridae
- Subfamily: Macropathinae
- Genus: Setascutum; Richards, 1972

Species
- See text

Genus of orthopteran insects

Setascutum is a genus of cave wētā in the family Rhaphidophoridae, endemic to New Zealand. This genus was synonymised with Isoplectron in 2024.

== Species ==
- Setascutum ohauense Richards, 1972
- Setascutum pallidum Richards, 1972
