= Stonychophora =

Scientific classification
- Domain: Eukaryota
- Kingdom: Animalia
- Phylum: Arthropoda
- Class: Insecta
- Order: Orthoptera
- Suborder: Ensifera
- Family: Rhaphidophoridae
- Tribe: Rhaphidophorini
- Genus: Stonychophora; Karny, 1934

Genus of cricket-like animals

Stonychophora is a genus of camel crickets in the tribe Rhaphidophorini. Species in this genus can be found from Indo-China and Malesia to New Caledonia.

== Species ==
The Orthoptera Species File lists:

- Stonychophora alpha (Karny, 1930)
- Stonychophora angulata Gorochov, 2002
- Stonychophora biaki Gorochov, 2010
- Stonychophora buruensis (Karny, 1925)
- Stonychophora cattien Gorochov, 2012
- Stonychophora crenulata (Brunner von Wattenwyl, 1893)
- Stonychophora cultrifer (Zacher, 1909)
- Stonychophora denticulata Gorochov, 2010
- Stonychophora elegans Karny, 1934
- Stonychophora falsa Gorochov, 2002
- Stonychophora foeda (Brunner von Wattenwyl, 1888)
- Stonychophora fulva (Brunner von Wattenwyl, 1888)
  type species (as Rhaphidophora fulva = S. fulva fulva, locality Java)
- Stonychophora furca Gorochov, 2002
- Stonychophora glabra Chopard, 1940
- Stonychophora griffinii (Karny, 1928)
- Stonychophora halmahera Gorochov, 2012
- Stonychophora jayapurae Gorochov, 2010
- Stonychophora khmerica Gorochov, 2010
- Stonychophora kuthyi (Griffini, 1911)
- Stonychophora maculata Gorochov, 2010
- Stonychophora manokwari Gorochov, 2010
- Stonychophora minahassa Gorochov, 2012
- Stonychophora minor Ander, 1938
- Stonychophora nigerrima (Brunner von Wattenwyl, 1888)
- Stonychophora palauensis Vickery & Kevan, 1999
- Stonychophora papua (Brancsik, 1898)
- Stonychophora parafulva Gorochov, 2010
- Stonychophora parafurca Gorochov, 2010
- Stonychophora pileata Gorochov, 2012
- Stonychophora salomonensis Willemse, 1942
- Stonychophora sulawesi Gorochov, 2012
- Stonychophora supiori Gorochov, 2010
- Stonychophora sylvestris Gorochov, 2010
- Stonychophora tatianae Gorochov, 1999
- Stonychophora tessellata (Karny, 1930)
- Stonychophora tioman Gorochov, 2012
- Stonychophora trilobata Gorochov, 2012
- Stonychophora trusmadi Gorochov, 2010
