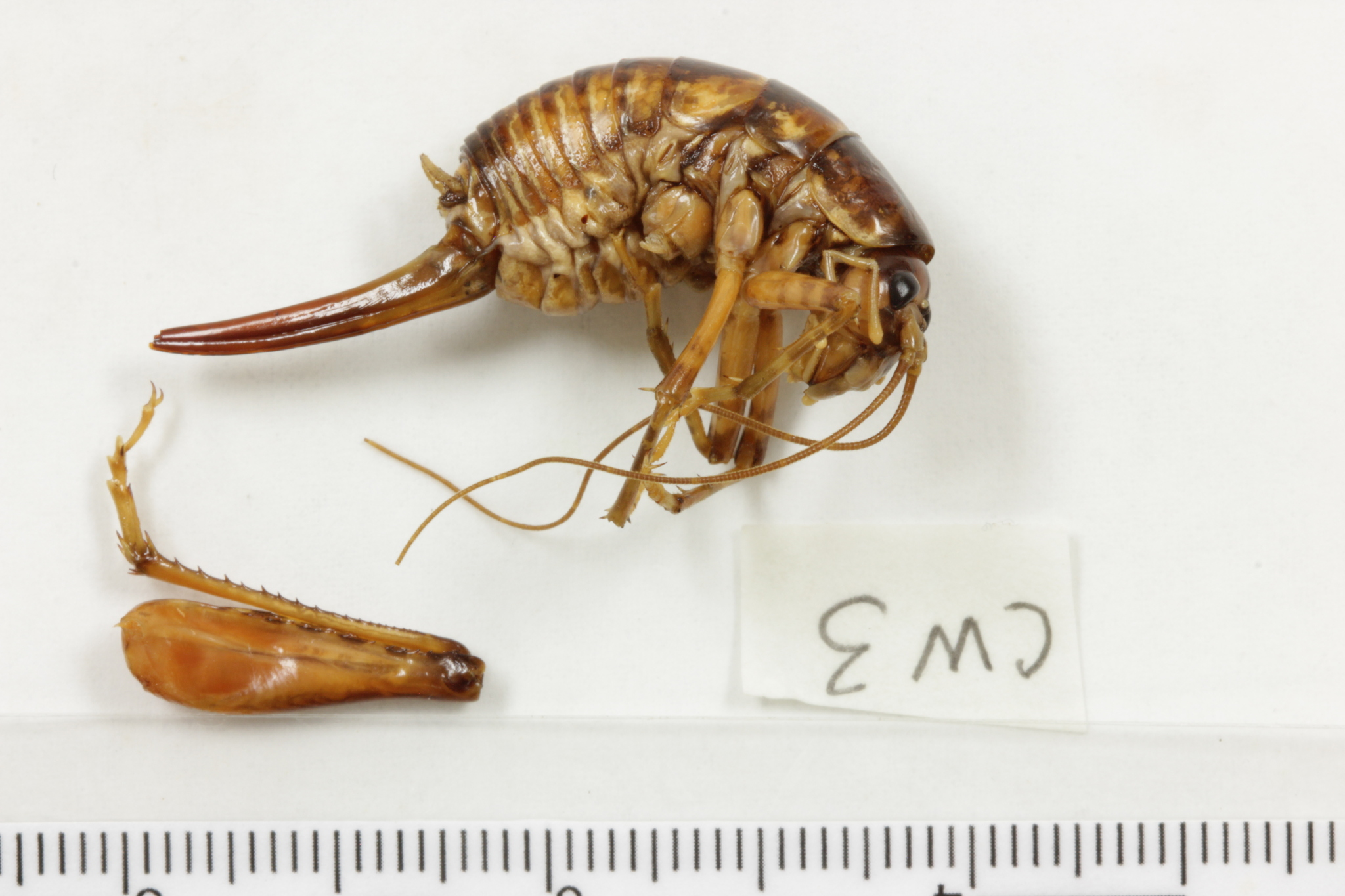
- Adult female Chatham Island wētā

Scientific classification
- Kingdom: Animalia
- Phylum: Arthropoda
- Clade: Pancrustacea
- Class: Insecta
- Order: Orthoptera
- Suborder: Ensifera
- Family: Rhaphidophoridae
- Subfamily: Macropathinae
- Genus: Novoplectron; Richards, 1958

Species
- See text.

= Novoplectron =

Genus of orthopteran insects

Novoplectron is a monotypic genus of cave wētā in the family Rhaphidophoridae, endemic to the Chatham Islands. Cave wētā are nocturnal, wingless crickets that occupy humid habitats. Novoplectron wētā generally live under stones and in burrows of seabirds, such as broad-billed prions, mutton birds and storm petrels.

== Distribution & Taxonomy ==
The genus Novoplectron have only been recorded on the Chatham Islands (a group of offshore islands of New Zealand). These wētā exist alongside Talitropsis crassicruris, another New Zealand endemic species, on Mangere, Pitt, Rangatira and The Sisters islands. However, there is an absence of Novoplectron wētā on the Chatham main island. (See distribution map https://wetageta.massey.ac.nz/Text%20files/NOVOPLECTRON2014.html).

Several wētā specimens from the genus Pleioplectron were collected from the Chatham Islands in 1958. After examining them, Richards discovered that the Chatham Island endemic species Pleioplectron serratum Hutton, 1904 displayed five major morphological differences that were not found in other species of the genus Pleioplectron. It was determined that this species did not belong to any genus of Rhaphidophoridae that had been previously recognised. This led to a new genus, Novoplectron Richards, 1958, being described, and the Chatham Island species was reassigned as Novoplectron serratum (Hutton, 1904). This Chatham Island Rhaphidophoridae is sister to the Bounty Island species Ischyroplectron isolatum.

== Morphology ==
Wētā of the genus Novoplectron have stocky bodies that can be up to 26 millimetres long and are thinly covered with short setae. They have very long, tapering antennae, which are about three times the length of their body. Some sections of their thin legs are armed with variable numbers of spines. The subgenital plate of females tends to be broad and short with a wide distal margin. While males tend to have a short triangular subgenital plate that has a long abrupt taper and curved at the apex.

== Diet ==
Cave wētās are predominantly scavengers that feed on animal and plant material found within the caves they inhabit. Although, they will forage in the surrounding area if food becomes scarce inside the cave. The diet of Novoplectron mainly consists of dead seabirds. However, they have also been known to eat other types of animal and plant material.

== Species ==
- Novoplectron serratum (Hutton, 1904)
