= Styracosceles neomexicanus =

Scientific classification
- Domain: Eukaryota
- Kingdom: Animalia
- Phylum: Arthropoda
- Class: Insecta
- Order: Orthoptera
- Suborder: Ensifera
- Family: Rhaphidophoridae
- Subfamily: Ceuthophilinae
- Genus: Styracosceles
- Species: S. neomexicanus

Binomial name
- Styracosceles neomexicanus (Scudder, 1894)

Species of cricket-like animal

Styracosceles neomexicanus, the new Mexico camel cricket, is a species of camel cricket in the family Rhaphidophoridae. It is found in North America.
