= Pallidotettix =

Scientific classification
- Kingdom: Animalia
- Phylum: Arthropoda
- Clade: Pancrustacea
- Class: Insecta
- Order: Orthoptera
- Suborder: Ensifera
- Family: Rhaphidophoridae
- Genus: Pallidotettix; Richards, 1968
- Species: P. nullarborensis

Binomial name
- Pallidotettix nullarborensis Richards, 1968

Monotypic genus of cricket

Pallidotettix is a genus of cave cricket endemic to the caves of the Nullarbor Plain of southern Australia, and contains only the species Pallidotettix nullarborensis. Like all cave crickets native to Australia, it belongs to the subfamily Macropathinae. Aola M. Richards was first to describe the species in 1968 firstly from Gecko Cave, a cave on the farthest southwest extent of the plain, and White Wells Cave, a cave on the farthest eastern extent of the plain, as well as multiple caves in between.

== Distribution and habitat ==
Pallidotettix nullarborensis is endemic to the caves of the Nullarbor Plain. The plain is an area of limestone karst of approximately 200,000 square kilometres, stretching over 1,000 kilometres across the border between South Australia and Western Australia and approximately 400 kilometres from the coast on the south to the Great Victoria Desert in the north. Rainfall in the Nullarbor is highest closest to the coast - as cave formation is driven by the dissolution of limestone due to rainfall, the highest density of deep caves on the Nullarbor occur within 60 kilometres of the coast with a shallower, vertical tube type cave known as "blowholes" occurring 75 kilometres from the coast. Pallidotettix nullarborensis cannot survive outside the caves due to the arid conditions of the Nullarbor plain during the day, and is only seen emerging from caves when surface relative humidity is greater than 90%. Caves offer stable climates with little temperature and humidity change throughout the day and Pallidotettix nullarborensis shows relatively little troglomorphism, so restriction to caves can be hypothesized to be entirely due inhospitality of outside climate rather than true subterranean restriction. Other species of Australian rhaphidophoridae that are morphologically similar such as Australotettix montanus are recognized as being epigean, rather than cavernicolous. Since being documented in 1968, subsequent expeditions and cave explorations have documented P. nullarborensis in over 70 caves across the Nullarbor, making it the most widespread species across all caves, spanning the entire extent of the Nullarbor from east to west and as far north as the Trans-Australian Railway.

Pallidotettix nullarborensis will hide from daylight in cracks and fissures and emerge onto the cave walls when active at night. Like other Rhaphidophoridae, P. nullarborensis are not true troglobionts, and will move from across zones, from the surface environment to the deep zone, moving towards areas of higher humidity. It is unknown how, if at all, P. nullarborensis is able to disperse or migrate, though numerous hypotheses have been presented.

== Morphology ==
Pallidotettix nullarborensis displays the most troglomorphic adaptation out of all Australian rhaphidophoridae, showing some loss of pigmentation with colours ranging from light-brown to ochreous as well as narrowing and lengthening of limbs. Pallidotettix nullarborensis has the highest ratio of total leg length to hind femur width compared to other Australian Rhaphidophoridae due to lengthened middle and fore limbs and a thinning of the hind leg. Beyond this, Pallidotettix nullarborensis shows no loss of vision nor other typical troglomorphic traits.

Sexual dimorphism is largely absent apart from the ovipositer, which is approximately 80% the length of the body, which in adults is approximately 15 millimetres, similar to Australotettix montanus.

== Taxonomy ==
Pallidotettix nullarborensis is a member of the Macropathinae subfamily, and is most closely related to Novotettix naracoortensis, a species endemic to the caves near Naracoorte, close to the South Australia-Victoria border. Together, these two species form a sister clade to the Micropathus genus of Tasmania. Divergence time between N. naracoortensis and P. nullarborensis was placed between 20 and 45 million years ago, which lines up with separation and reduction of rainforest areas between moden South Australia and the Nullarbor due to climate changing, so it can be hypothesized that the ancestor species was allopatrically separated and speciated.

== Diet and ecology ==
Pallidotettix nullarborensis is primarily carnivorous, with the majority of its diet consisting of other arthropods. Like many Rhaphidophoridae, the species is also capable of widespread omnivory, and has been documented consuming fungi, faeces, vertebrates both live (bird chicks) and dead, fungi, and decaying vegetation. Caves in general, and especially on the Nullarbor, are low-productivity environments owing to the lack of light. Most invertebrate species within the Nullarbor caves are saprophages or coprophages, consuming vegetation that has been washed or blown into the caves, guano from roosting bats or birds, or faeces from vertebrate species that live on the plain such as foxes, wombats, rabbits, or dingoes. Pallidotettix nullarborensis preys on these invertebrates, and may in turn be preyed upon by other endemic, cavernicolous predators like centipedes (Cryptops) or spiders (Tartarus and Troglodiplura).
