= Daihiniodes hastifera =

Scientific classification
- Domain: Eukaryota
- Kingdom: Animalia
- Phylum: Arthropoda
- Class: Insecta
- Order: Orthoptera
- Suborder: Ensifera
- Family: Rhaphidophoridae
- Subfamily: Ceuthophilinae
- Genus: Daihiniodes
- Species: D. hastifera

Binomial name
- Daihiniodes hastifera (Rehn, 1902)

Species of cricket-like animal

Daihiniodes hastifera, the Arizona sand-treader cricket, is a species of camel cricket in the family Rhaphidophoridae. It is found in North America.
