= Daihiniodes larvale =

Scientific classification
- Domain: Eukaryota
- Kingdom: Animalia
- Phylum: Arthropoda
- Class: Insecta
- Order: Orthoptera
- Suborder: Ensifera
- Family: Rhaphidophoridae
- Subfamily: Ceuthophilinae
- Genus: Daihiniodes
- Species: D. larvale

Binomial name
- Daihiniodes larvale Strohecker, 1947

Species of cricket-like animal

Daihiniodes larvale, known generally as the Stohecker's sand-treader cricket or Strohecker's camel cricket, is a species of camel cricket in the family Rhaphidophoridae. It is found in North America.
