= Phrixocnemis =

Scientific classification
- Domain: Eukaryota
- Kingdom: Animalia
- Phylum: Arthropoda
- Class: Insecta
- Order: Orthoptera
- Suborder: Ensifera
- Family: Rhaphidophoridae
- Subfamily: Ceuthophilinae
- Genus: Phrixocnemis; Scudder, 1894
- Species: P. truculentus

Binomial name
- Phrixocnemis truculentus Scudder, 1894

Genus of cricket-like animals

Phrixocnemis is a genus of camel crickets in the family Rhaphidophoridae. There is one described species in Phrixocnemis, P. truculentus.
