= Farallonophilus =

Scientific classification
- Domain: Eukaryota
- Kingdom: Animalia
- Phylum: Arthropoda
- Class: Insecta
- Order: Orthoptera
- Suborder: Ensifera
- Family: Rhaphidophoridae
- Subfamily: Ceuthophilinae
- Genus: Farallonophilus; Rentz, 1972
- Species: F. cavernicolus

Binomial name
- Farallonophilus cavernicolus Rentz, 1972

Genus of camel crickets

Farallonophilus is a genus of camel crickets in the family Rhaphidophoridae. The only described species in the genus is Farallonophilus cavernicolus, also known as the Farallon cave cricket or the Farallon camel cricket, which is endemic to the Farallon Islands in California, United States. It was first described by David C. Rentz in 1972. It is nocturnal, and is thought to eat food brought in by nesting seabirds.
