= Styracosceles =

Scientific classification
- Domain: Eukaryota
- Kingdom: Animalia
- Phylum: Arthropoda
- Class: Insecta
- Order: Orthoptera
- Suborder: Ensifera
- Family: Rhaphidophoridae
- Subfamily: Ceuthophilinae
- Genus: Styracosceles; Hubbell, 1936

Genus of cricket-like animals

Styracosceles is a genus of camel crickets in the family Rhaphidophoridae. There are at least four described species in Styracosceles.

== Species ==
These four species belong to the genus Styracosceles:

- Styracosceles longispinosus (Caudell, 1916)
- Styracosceles neomexicanus (Scudder, 1894) (new Mexico camel cricket)
- Styracosceles oregonensis (Caudell, 1916)
- Styracosceles serratus (Rehn, 1905)
