= Rhachocnemis =

Scientific classification
- Domain: Eukaryota
- Kingdom: Animalia
- Phylum: Arthropoda
- Class: Insecta
- Order: Orthoptera
- Suborder: Ensifera
- Family: Rhaphidophoridae
- Subfamily: Ceuthophilinae
- Genus: Rhachocnemis; Caudell, 1916
- Species: R. validus

Binomial name
- Rhachocnemis validus (Scudder, 1894)

Genus of cricket-like animals

Rhachocnemis is a genus of sand-treader crickets in the family Rhaphidophoridae, with one described species, R. validus.
