= Daihiniella =

Scientific classification
- Domain: Eukaryota
- Kingdom: Animalia
- Phylum: Arthropoda
- Class: Insecta
- Order: Orthoptera
- Suborder: Ensifera
- Family: Rhaphidophoridae
- Subfamily: Ceuthophilinae
- Genus: Daihiniella; Hubbell, 1936
- Species: D. bellicosa

Binomial name
- Daihiniella bellicosa (Scudder, 1894)

Genus of cricket-like animals

Daihiniella is a genus of sand-treader crickets in the family Rhaphidophoridae. There is one described species in Daihiniella, D. bellicosa.
