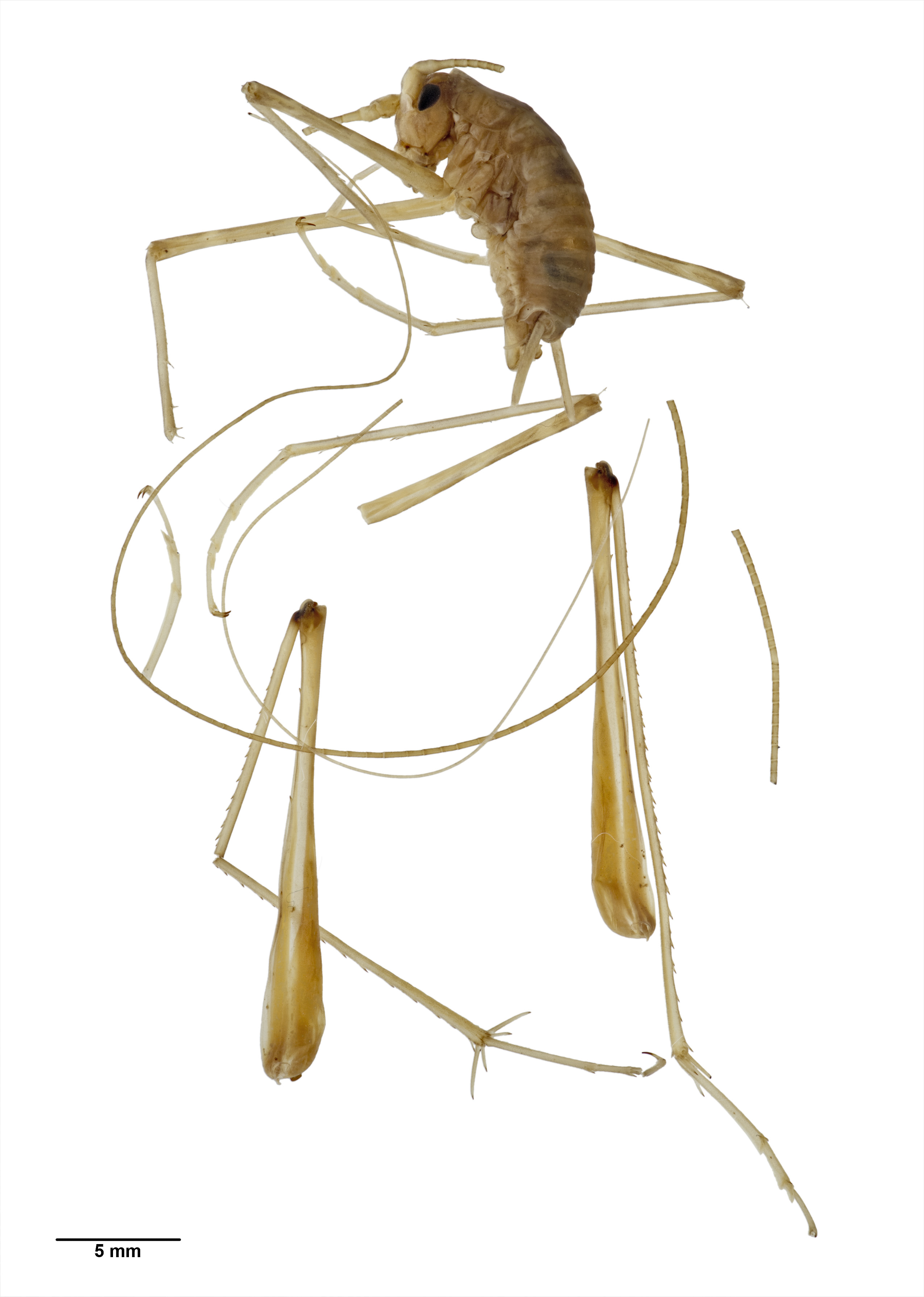
- Male holotype specimen of Pallidoplectron turneri.

Scientific classification
- Kingdom: Animalia
- Phylum: Arthropoda
- Clade: Pancrustacea
- Class: Insecta
- Order: Orthoptera
- Suborder: Ensifera
- Family: Rhaphidophoridae
- Subfamily: Macropathinae
- Genus: Pallidoplectron; Richards, 1958

Species
- See text.

= Pallidoplectron =

Genus of orthopteran insects

Pallidoplectron is a genus of cave wētā in the family Rhaphidophoridae, endemic to New Zealand.

== Species ==
- Pallidoplectron peniculosum Richards, 1960
- Pallidoplectron subterraneum Richards, 1965
- Pallidoplectron turneri Richards, 1958b
