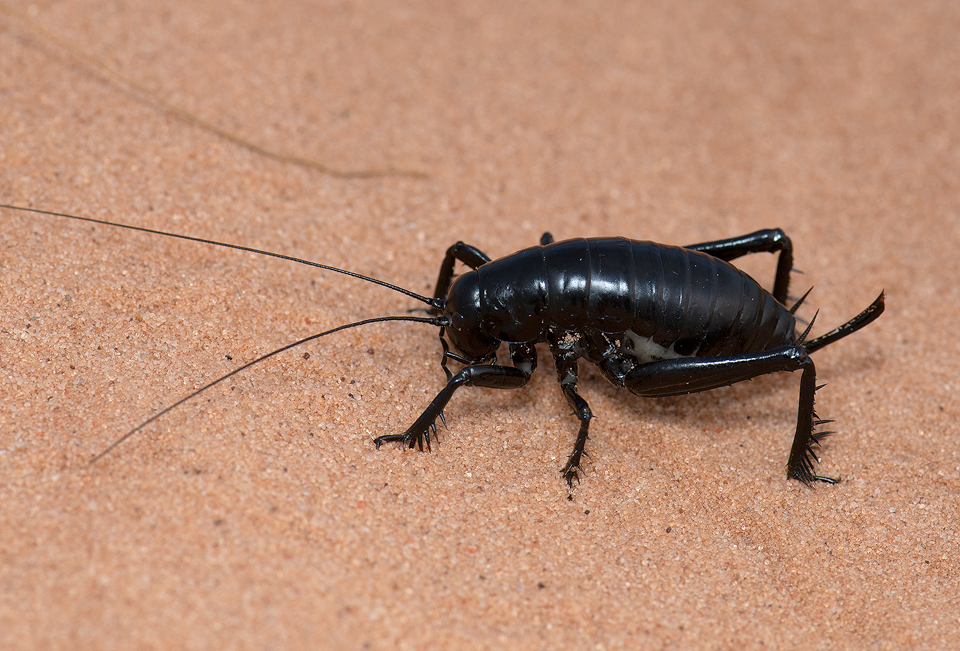

Conservation status
- Vulnerable (IUCN 2.3)

Scientific classification
- Kingdom: Animalia
- Phylum: Arthropoda
- Class: Insecta
- Order: Orthoptera
- Suborder: Ensifera
- Family: Rhaphidophoridae
- Genus: Utabaenetes; Tinkham, 1970
- Species: U. tanneri

Binomial name
- Utabaenetes tanneri Tinkham, 1970

= Utabaenetes =

Utabaenetes tanneri

Species of cricket-like animal

Utabaenetes is a genus of insects in the family Rhaphidophoridae. It is monotypic, containing the single species Utabaenetes tanneri, commonly known as Tanner's black camel cricket, that is endemic to the desert of San Rafael Swell in the western United States.
