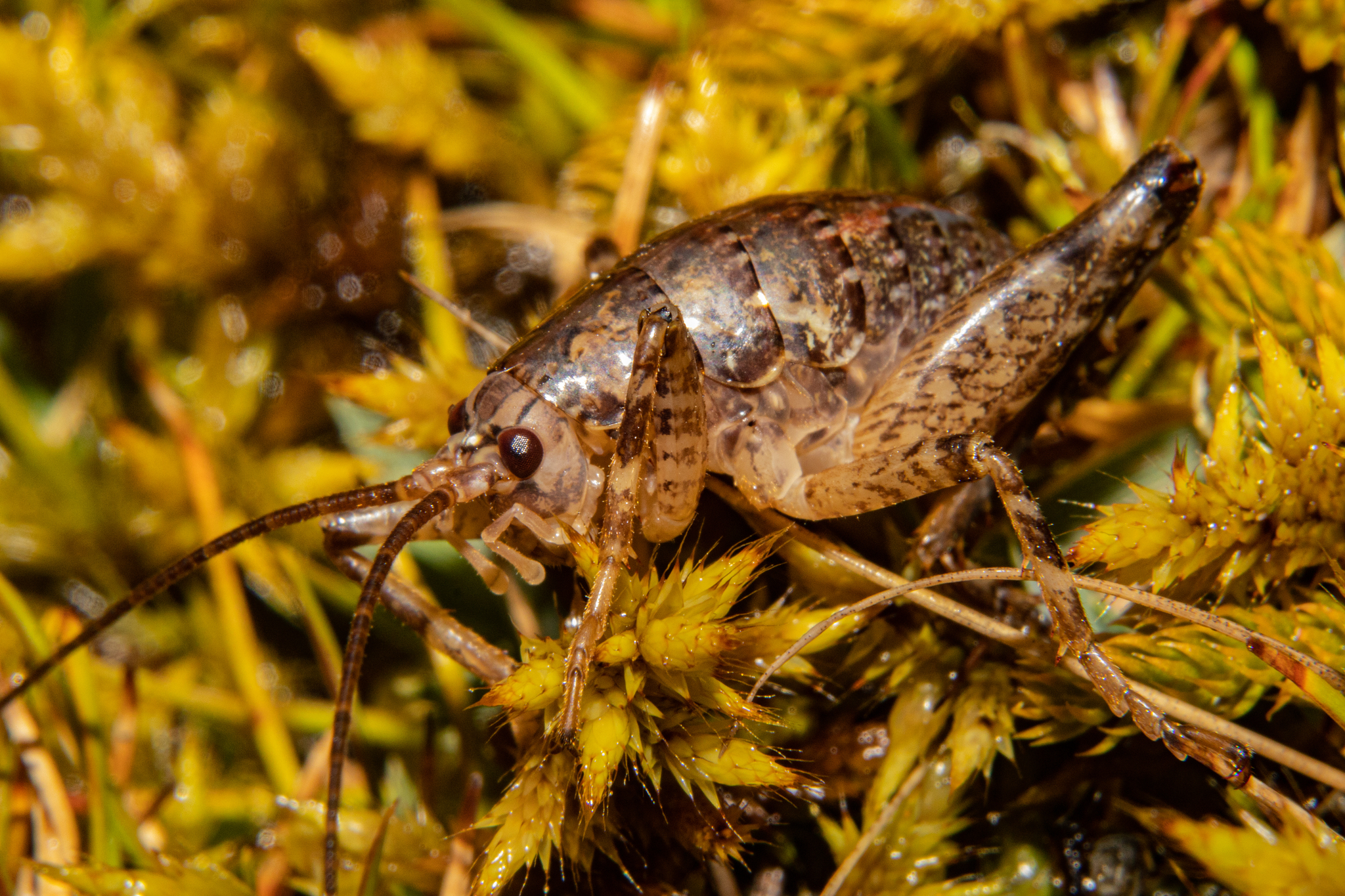
- Crux boudica

Scientific classification
- Kingdom: Animalia
- Phylum: Arthropoda
- Clade: Pancrustacea
- Class: Insecta
- Order: Orthoptera
- Suborder: Ensifera
- Family: Rhaphidophoridae
- Subfamily: Macropathinae
- Genus: Crux; Trewick, 2024

Species
- See text

= Crux (insect) =

Genus of orthopteran insects

Crux is a genus of cave wētā in the family Rhaphidophoridae. Two species are currently recognised, both of which are endemic to New Zealand.

== Etymology ==
The name is a reference to Crux, the constellation also known as the Southern Cross, which is prominent in the skies of New Zealand.

== Taxonomy and morphology ==
The genus Crux was described by Steven A. Trewick in 2024, who chose Crux boudica to be the type species. Trewick suggested that the small size of Crux was a reason why the genus had been previously overlooked. Both members of the genus are approximately 17–28 mm (0.67–1.10 in) in length, with antennae of the females being three times longer than their bodies. Members of Crux are medium-sized, dark brown, with a stocky body and short robust legs. Crux most closely resembles the New Zealand species Talitropsis sedilloti.

== Distribution ==
The two species of Crux are found in the South Island and Stewart Island.

== Species ==
- Crux boudica Trewick, 2024
- Crux heggi Trewick, 2024

== Gallery ==
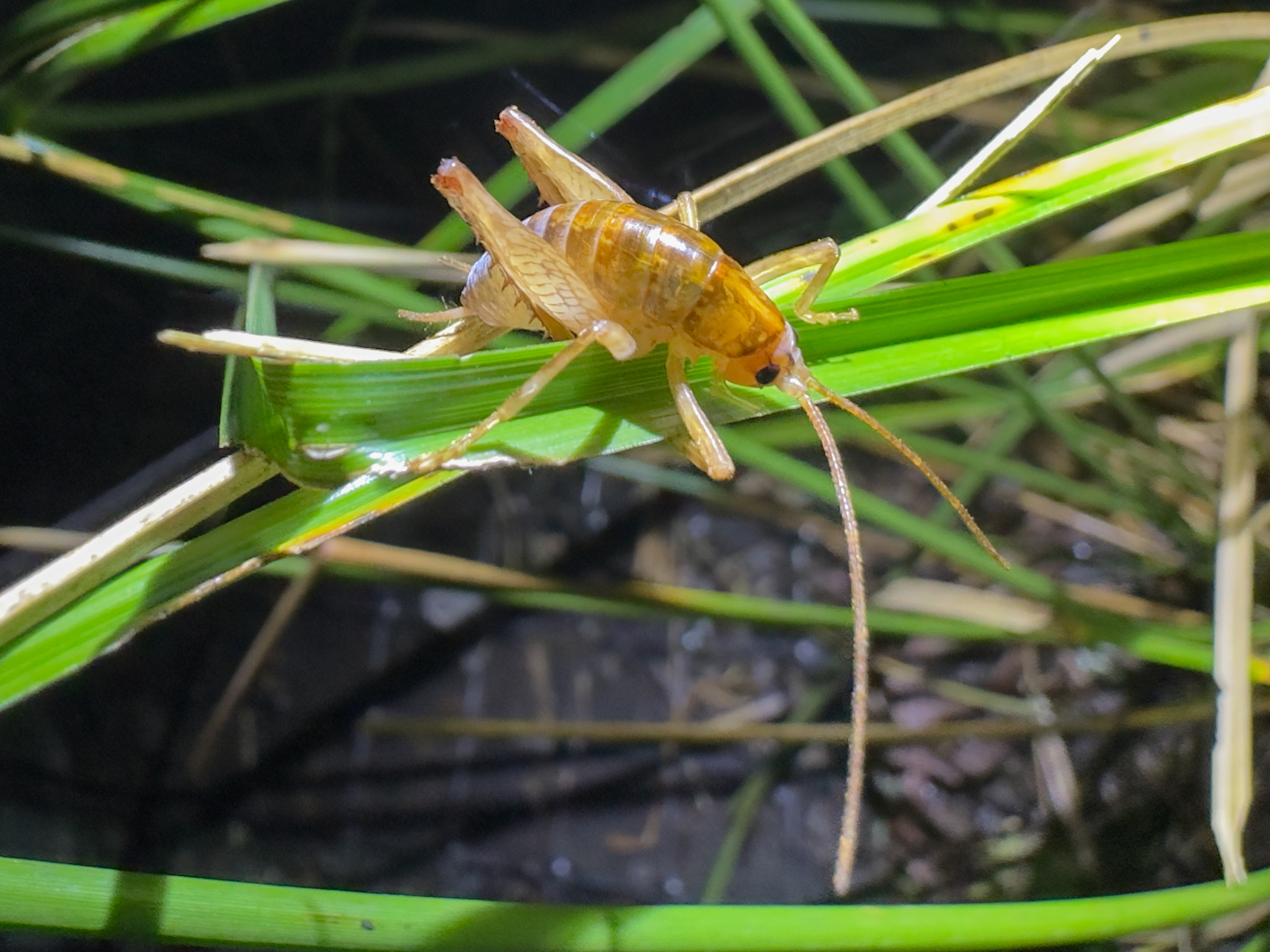
Crux boudica

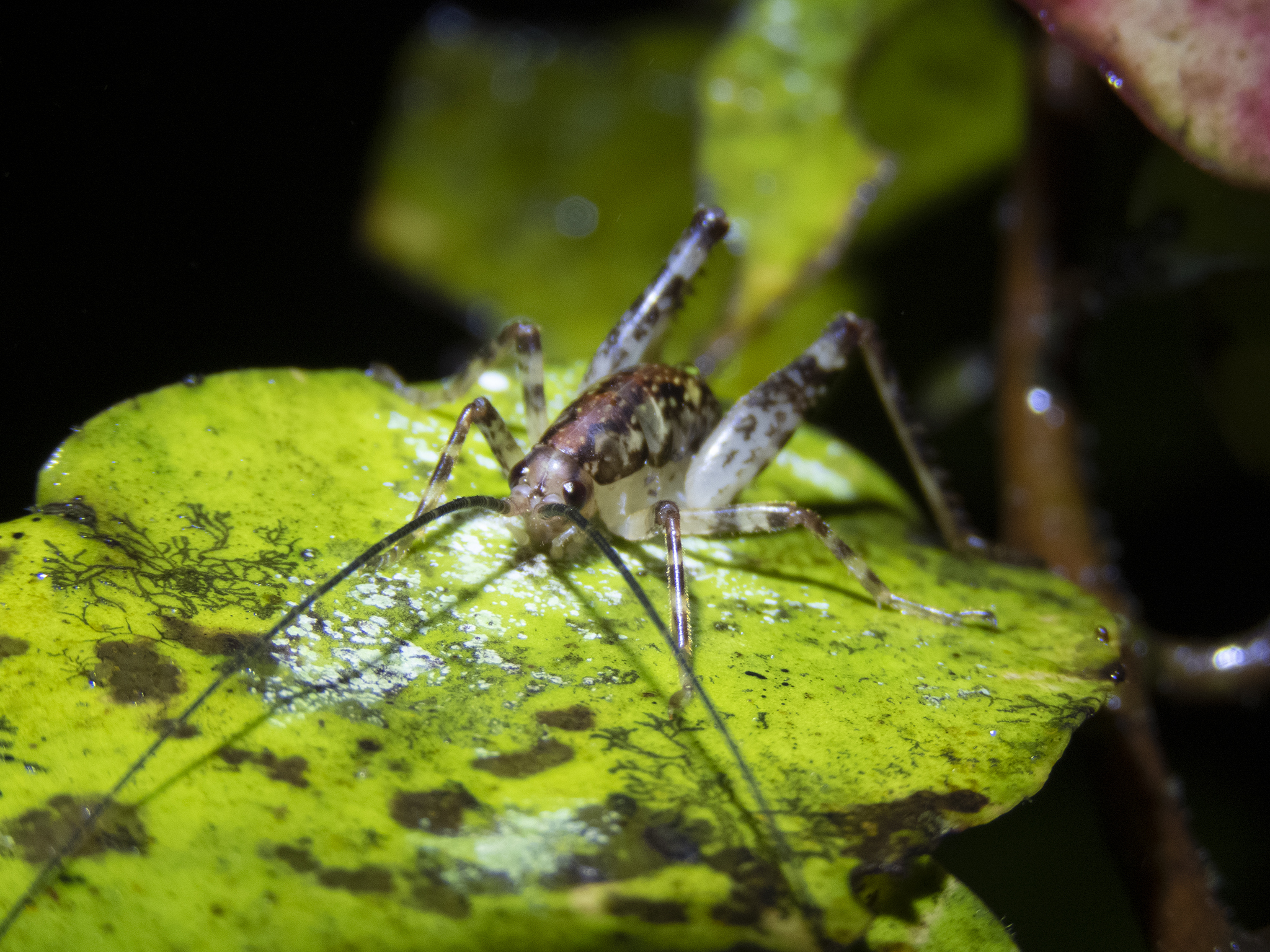
Crux heggi
