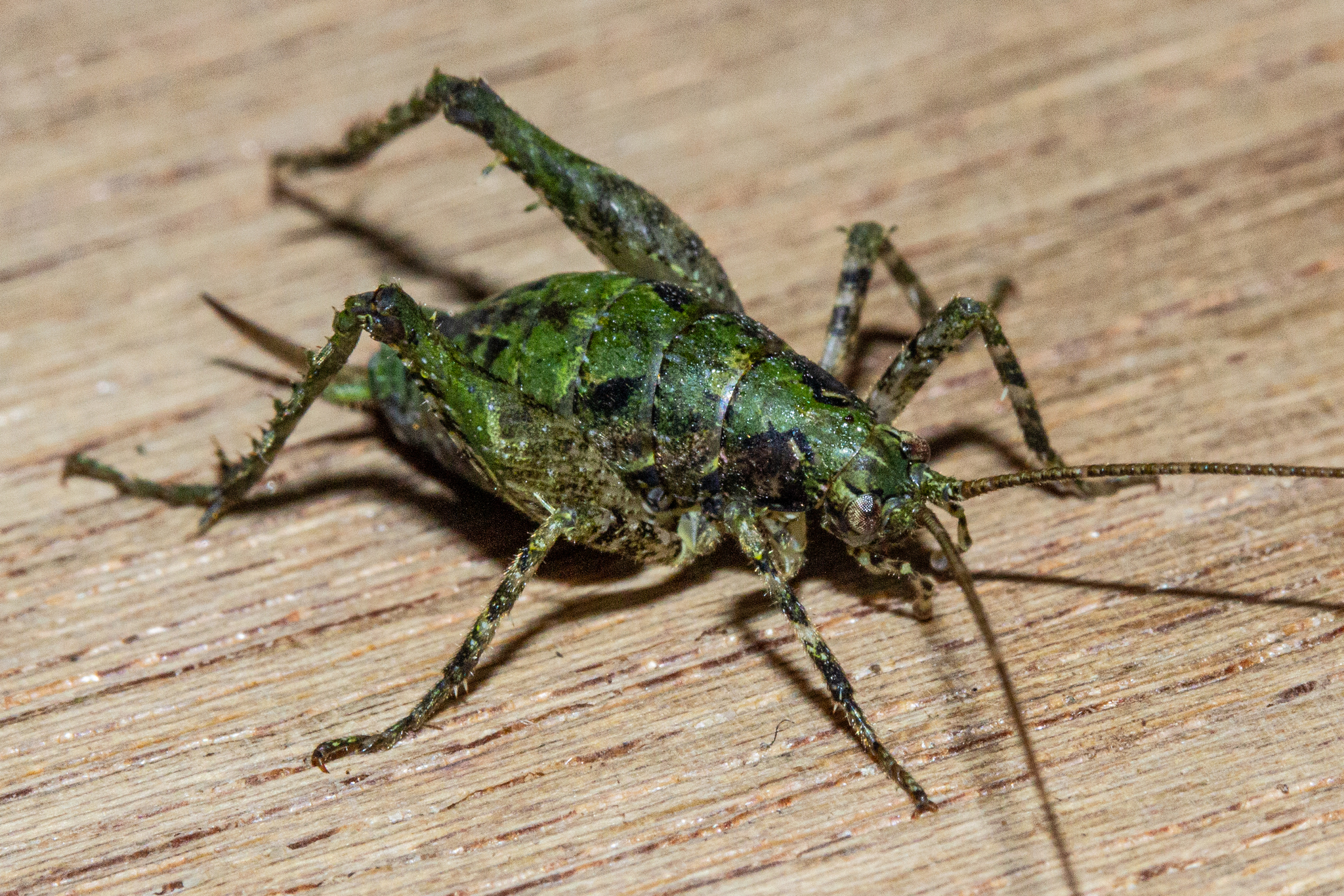

Scientific classification
- Kingdom: Animalia
- Phylum: Arthropoda
- Clade: Pancrustacea
- Class: Insecta
- Order: Orthoptera
- Suborder: Ensifera
- Family: Rhaphidophoridae
- Subfamily: Macropathinae
- Genus: Maotoweta; Johns & Cook, 2014
- Species: M. virescens

Binomial name
- Maotoweta virescens Johns & Cook, 2014

= Maotoweta =

Species of cave wētā insect

Maotoweta is a monotypic genus of cave wētā in the subfamily Macropathinae. The only known species is Maotoweta virescens, commonly known as the green moss wētā. It is endemic to Aotearoa New Zealand and found in forests throughout the South Island.

== Taxonomy ==
The holotype of Maotoweta virescens was collected from Bog Creek Forest in the Takitimu Mountains of Southland New Zealand in 2006. This species was formally described in 2014. DNA sequencing has shown the genus Maotoweta to be closely related to Notoplectron in the subfamily Macropathinae.

== Etymology ==
The genus name Maotoweta comes from the Māori language word maoto, meaning fresh green, new growth. The species name virescens is Latin meaning growing green or verdant.

== Description ==
The most distinguishing feature of Maotoweta viriscens is its highly variable mottled green colouration. All other described cave wētā species are shades of brown, brownish black, and yellow-brown, with mottling, bands, or stripes. It is a small cave wētā, measuring 9-12 mm long.

== Distribution and habitat ==
Maotoweta virescens is present throughout the south island of New Zealand, but is more commonly found west of the Southern Alps. It has been found along a wide range of elevations in areas of high rainfall. It is most commonly found in native forests that support dense growth of arboreal mosses and liverworts. This is inferred to be the preferred habitat of M. virescens; however, smaller populations have been found in beech forests.

== Behaviour and ecology ==
Like most wētā, Maotoweta virescens is nocturnal. It lives in close association with arboreal mosses and liverworts and has been observed feeding on Weymouthia mollis a species of feather moss as well as lichens and dead insects.

== Conservation status ==
Previously considered one of the rarest cave wētā, surveys conducted in 2021 used vegetation beating in addition to night searches and found Maotoweta virescens to be present throughout the south island. It is classified as 'not threatened' in the New Zealand Threat Classification System.
