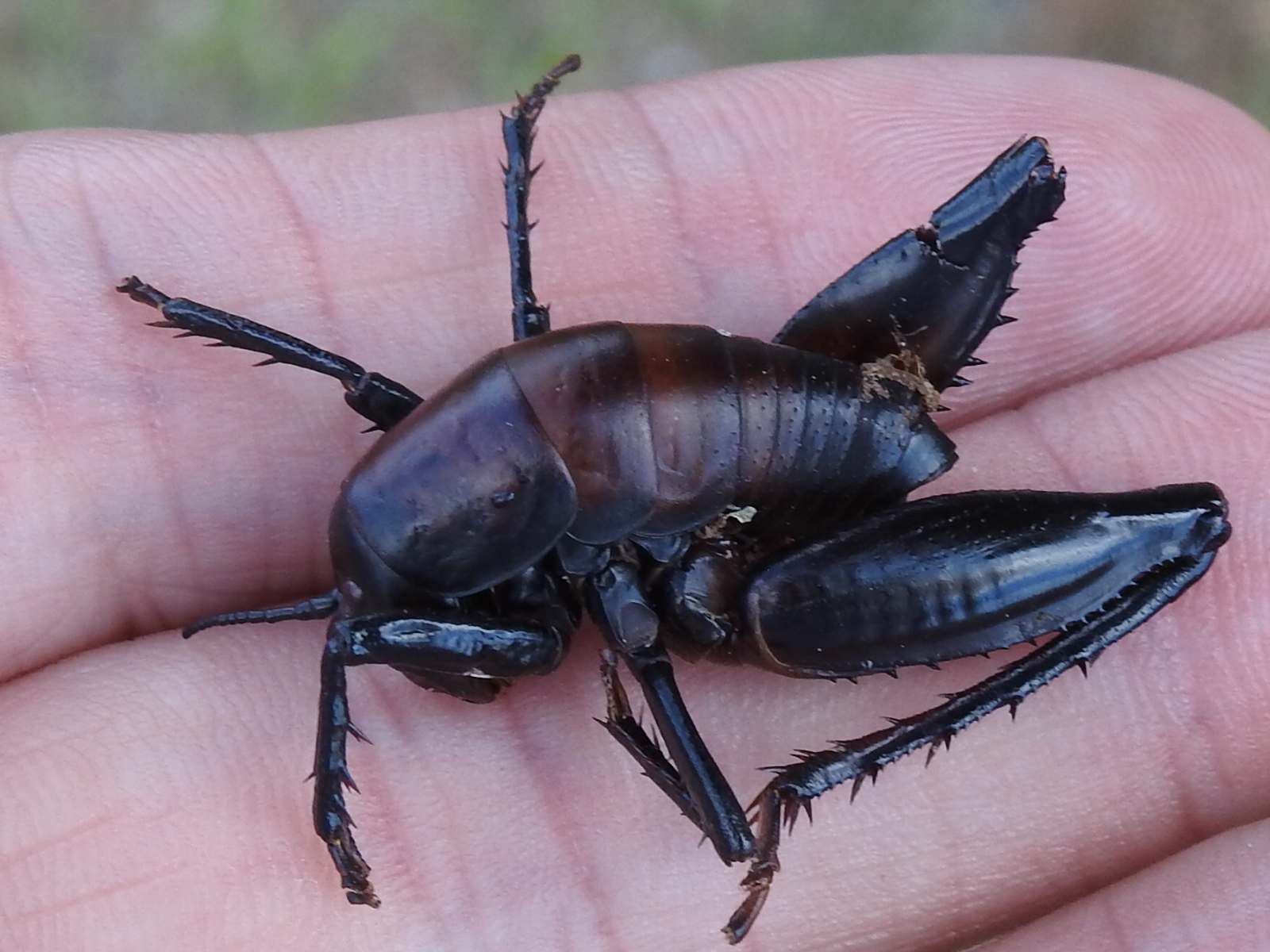

Scientific classification
- Domain: Eukaryota
- Kingdom: Animalia
- Phylum: Arthropoda
- Class: Insecta
- Order: Orthoptera
- Suborder: Ensifera
- Family: Rhaphidophoridae
- Subfamily: Ceuthophilinae
- Genus: Udeopsylla; Scudder, 1863
- Species: U. robusta

Binomial name
- Udeopsylla robusta (Haldeman, 1850)

= Udeopsylla =

Genus of cricket-like animals

Udeopsylla is a genus of camel crickets in the family Rhaphidophoridae. It is monotypic, being represented by the single species Udeopsylla robusta.
