= Rhaphidophorinae =

Scientific classification
- Kingdom: Animalia
- Phylum: Arthropoda
- Class: Insecta
- Order: Orthoptera
- Suborder: Ensifera
- Family: Rhaphidophoridae
- Subfamily: Rhaphidophorinae; Walker, 1869

Subfamily of cricket-like animals

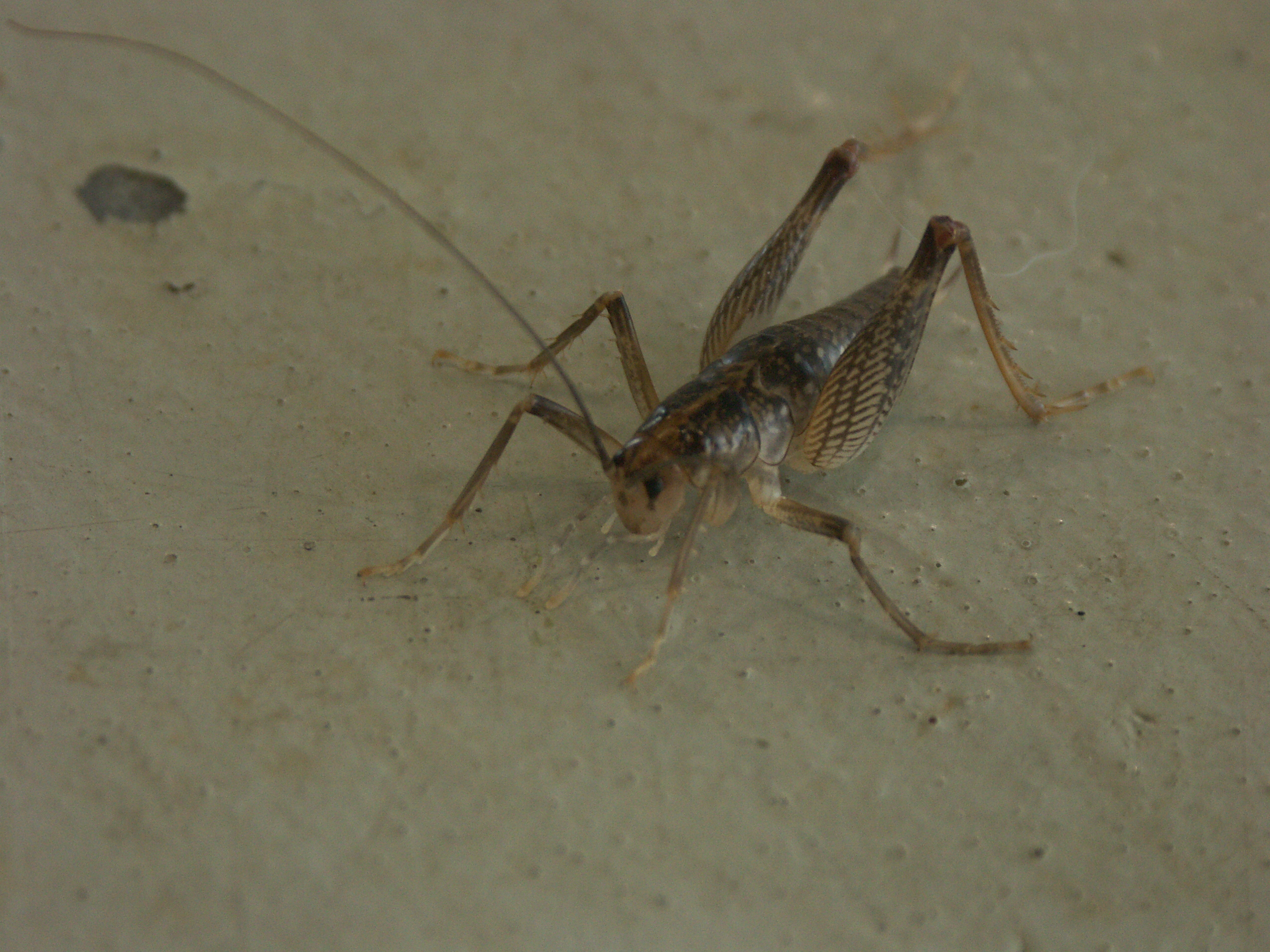
Rhaphidophoridae

The subfamily Rhaphidophorinae contains the single tribe of camel crickets, the Rhaphidophorini, based on the type genus Rhaphidophora.

Species can be found in: India, southern China, Japan, Indo-China, Malesia and Australasia.

== Genera ==
The Orthoptera Species File lists:

1. Diarhaphidophora Gorochov, 2012
2. Eurhaphidophora Gorochov, 1999
3. Minirhaphidophora Gorochov, 2002
4. Neorhaphidophora Gorochov, 1999
5. Pararhaphidophora – monotypic: Pararhaphidophora anatoliji Gorochov, 1999
6. Rhaphidophora Serville, 1838
7. Sinorhaphidophora Qin, Jiang, Liu & Li, 2018 – monotypic: Sinorhaphidophora hainanensis (Bian & Shi, 2016)
8. Stonychophora Karny, 1934
