= Daihiniodes =

Scientific classification
- Domain: Eukaryota
- Kingdom: Animalia
- Phylum: Arthropoda
- Class: Insecta
- Order: Orthoptera
- Suborder: Ensifera
- Family: Rhaphidophoridae
- Subfamily: Ceuthophilinae
- Genus: Daihiniodes; Hebard, 1929

Genus of cricket-like animals

Daihiniodes is a genus of sand-treader crickets in the family Rhaphidophoridae. There are at least two described species in Daihiniodes.

== Species ==
These two species belong to the genus Daihiniodes:

- Daihiniodes hastifera (Rehn, 1902) (Arizona sand-treader cricket)
- Daihiniodes larvale Strohecker, 1947 (Stohecker's sand-treader cricket)
