= Daihinia =

Scientific classification
- Domain: Eukaryota
- Kingdom: Animalia
- Phylum: Arthropoda
- Class: Insecta
- Order: Orthoptera
- Suborder: Ensifera
- Family: Rhaphidophoridae
- Subfamily: Ceuthophilinae
- Genus: Daihinia; Haldeman, 1850
- Species: D. brevipes

Binomial name
- Daihinia brevipes (Haldeman, 1850)

Genus of cricket-like animals

Daihinia is a genus of camel crickets in the family Rhaphidophoridae. There is one described species in Daihinia, D. brevipes.
