= Eurhaphidophora =

Scientific classification
- Domain: Eukaryota
- Kingdom: Animalia
- Phylum: Arthropoda
- Class: Insecta
- Order: Orthoptera
- Suborder: Ensifera
- Family: Rhaphidophoridae
- Subfamily: Rhaphidophorinae
- Tribe: Rhaphidophorini
- Genus: Eurhaphidophora; Gorochov, 1999

Genus of cricket-like animals

External image
- Image at iNaturalist

Eurhaphidophora is a genus of camel crickets in the monotypic tribe Rhaphidophorini. Species can be found in: China, Indo-China and Peninsular Malaysia.

== Species ==
The Orthoptera Species File lists:

1. Eurhaphidophora ampla Gorochov, 2010
2. Eurhaphidophora angusta Gorochov, 2010
3. Eurhaphidophora apicoexcisa Dawwrueng, Gorochov, Pinkaew & Vitheepradit, 2023
4. Eurhaphidophora bispina Gorochov, 2010
5. Eurhaphidophora bona Gorochov, 2012
6. Eurhaphidophora curvata Lu, Huang & Bian, 2022
7. Eurhaphidophora fossa Lu, Huang & Bian, 2022
8. Eurhaphidophora laosi Gorochov, 2010
9. Eurhaphidophora nataliae Gorochov, 1999 - type species
10. Eurhaphidophora orlovi Gorochov, 2010
11. Eurhaphidophora pawangkhananti Dawwrueng, Gorochov & Suwannapoom, 2020
12. Eurhaphidophora rotundata Gorochov, 2010
13. Eurhaphidophora tarasovi Gorochov, 2010
14. Eurhaphidophora truncata Bian & Shi, 2016
15. Eurhaphidophora visibilis Gorochov, 2010
