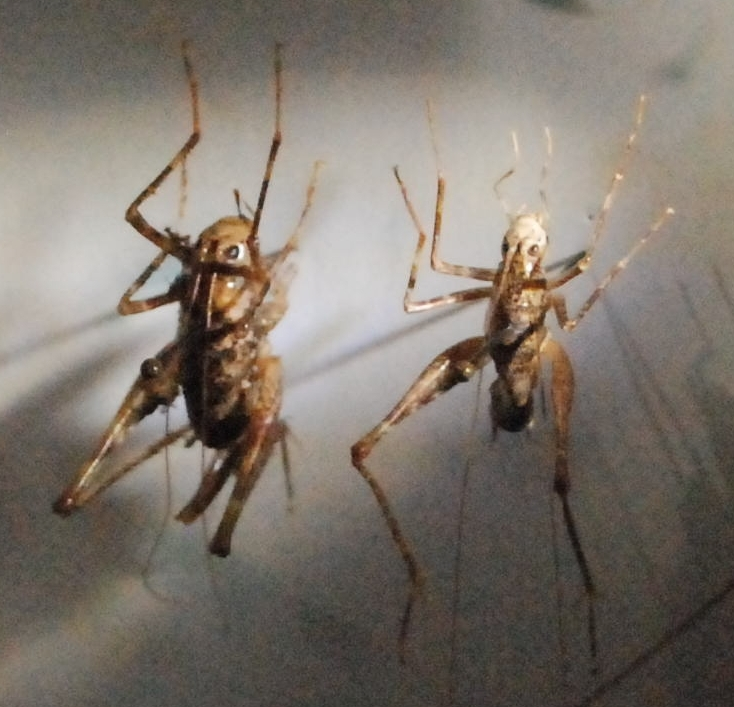
- Troglophilus neglectus

Scientific classification
- Domain: Eukaryota
- Kingdom: Animalia
- Phylum: Arthropoda
- Class: Insecta
- Order: Orthoptera
- Suborder: Ensifera
- Family: Rhaphidophoridae
- Subfamily: Troglophilinae
- Genus: Troglophilus; Krauss, 1879

Synonyms
- Dayscelus Werner, 1927

= Troglophilus =

Genus of cricket-like animals

External image
- Images at iNaturalist

Troglophilus is a genus of European cave crickets in the monotypic subfamily Troglophilinae; both taxa were erected by Hermann August Krauss in 1879. Species are distributed especially in the Mediterranean area, with records from Germany through to Turkey.

== Species ==
The Orthoptera Species File lists:

subgenus Paratroglophilus Karaman, 1958

1. Troglophilus neglectus Krauss, 1879
2. Troglophilus ovuliformis Karny, 1907

subgenus Troglophilus Krauss, 1879

1. Troglophilus adamovici Us, 1974
2. Troglophilus alanyaensis Taylan, Di Russo, Cobolli & Rampini, 2012
3. Troglophilus andreinii Capra, 1927
4. Troglophilus aspegi Taylan & Sirin, 2015
5. Troglophilus bicakcii Rampini & Di Russo, 2003
6. Troglophilus brevicauda Chopard, 1934
7. Troglophilus cavicola (Kollar, 1833) - type species (as Locusta cavicola Kollar, by subsequent designation)
8. Troglophilus escalerai Bolívar, 1899
9. Troglophilus ferzenensis Taylan, Di Russo, Cobolli & Rampini, 2012
10. Troglophilus fethiyensis Taylan, Di Russo, Cobolli & Rampini, 2012
11. Troglophilus gajaci Us, 1974
12. Troglophilus lagoi Mennozi, 1934
13. Troglophilus lazaropolensis Karaman, 1958
14. Troglophilus marinae Rampini & Di Russo, 2003
15. Troglophilus ozeli Taylan, Di Russo, Cobolli & Rampini, 2012
16. Troglophilus spinulosus Chopard, 1921
17. Troglophilus tatyanae Di Russo & Rampini, 2007
18. Troglophilus zoiai Di Russo, Rampini & Cobolli, 2014
19. Troglophilus zorae Karaman & Pavićević, 2011
