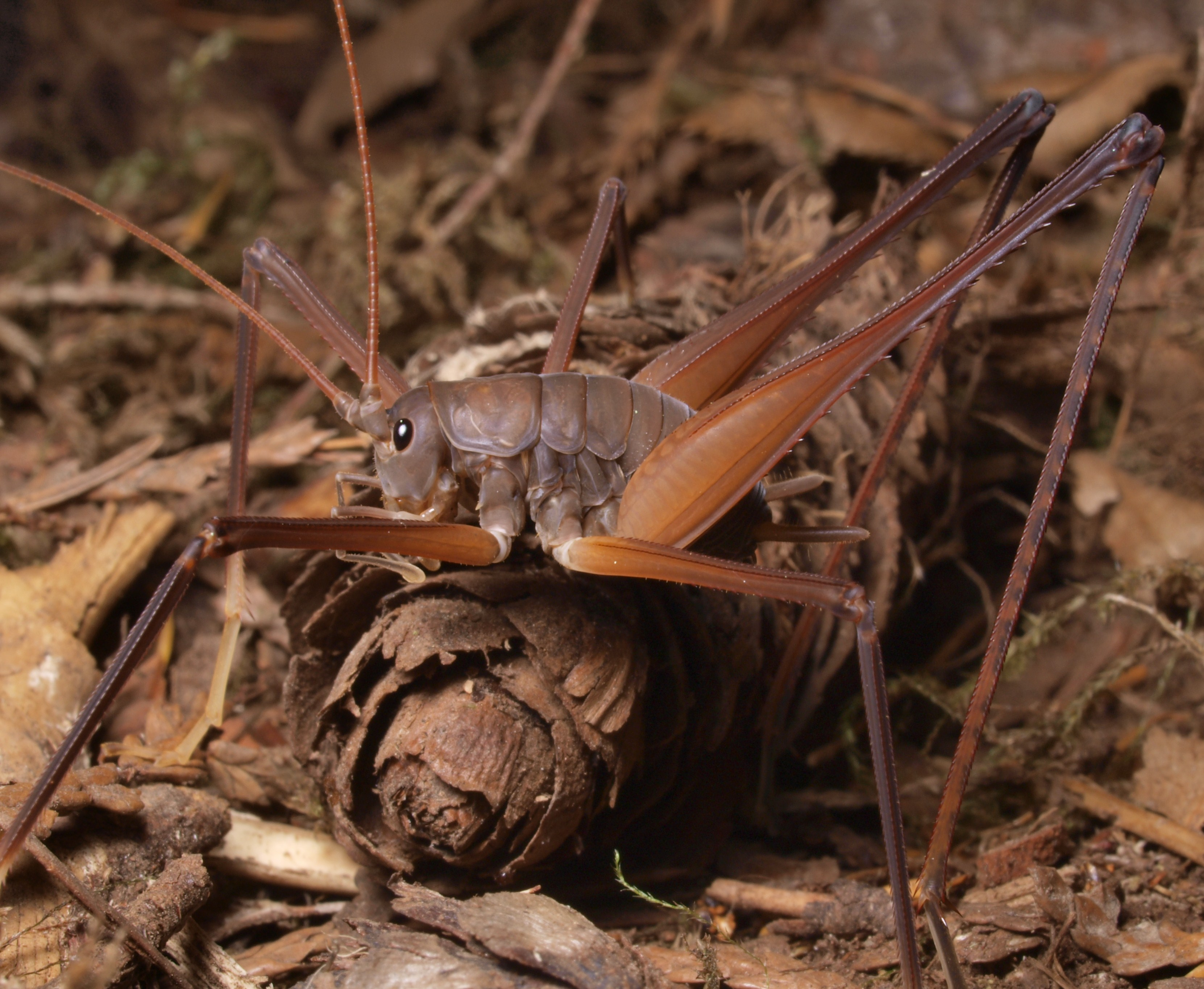

Scientific classification
- Domain: Eukaryota
- Kingdom: Animalia
- Phylum: Arthropoda
- Class: Insecta
- Order: Orthoptera
- Suborder: Ensifera
- Family: Rhaphidophoridae
- Genus: Tropidischia; Scudder, 1869
- Species: T. xanthostoma

Binomial name
- Tropidischia xanthostoma (Scudder, 1861)

= Tropidischia =

Tropidischia xanthostoma

Genus of cricket-like animals

Tropidischia is a genus of camel crickets in the family Rhaphidophoridae. The genus is monotypic, being represented by the single species Tropidischia xanthostoma.
