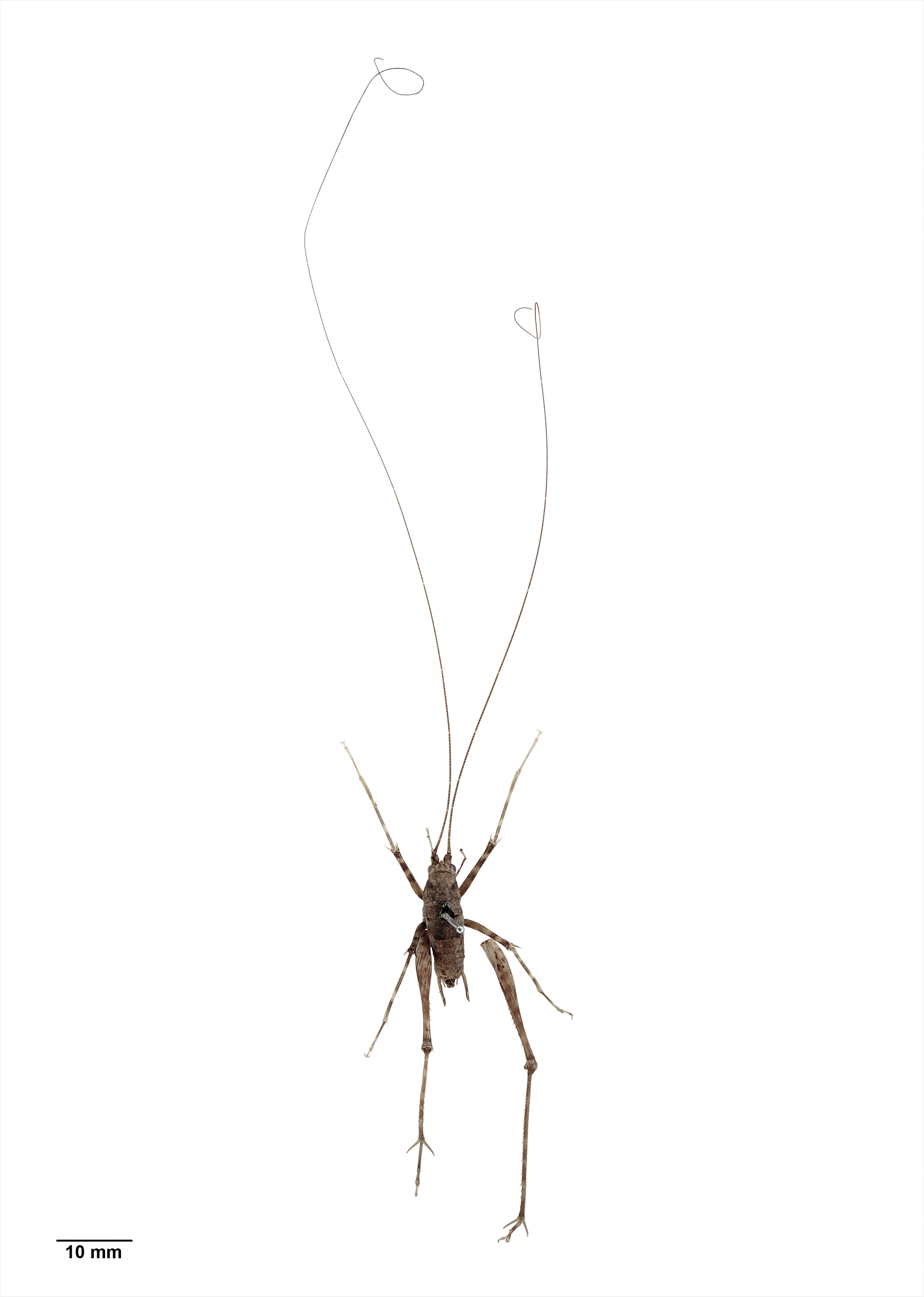
- Paraneonetus multispinus

Scientific classification
- Kingdom: Animalia
- Phylum: Arthropoda
- Clade: Pancrustacea
- Class: Insecta
- Order: Orthoptera
- Suborder: Ensifera
- Family: Rhaphidophoridae
- Genus: Paraneonetus; Salmon, 1948
- Species: P. multispinus

Binomial name
- Paraneonetus multispinus Salmon, 1948

= Paraneonetus =

Genus of orthopteran insects

Paraneonetus is a monotypic genus of wētā containing the species Paraneonetus multispinus, commonly known as the Three Kings cave wētā. P. multispinus is a cave wētā in the family Rhaphidophoridae, endemic to the Three Kings Islands of New Zealand.
