= Speleotettix =

Scientific classification
- Domain: Eukaryota
- Kingdom: Animalia
- Phylum: Arthropoda
- Class: Insecta
- Order: Orthoptera
- Suborder: Ensifera
- Family: Rhaphidophoridae
- Subfamily: Macropathinae
- Tribe: Macropathini
- Genus: Speleotettix; Chopard, 1944

Genus of insects

Speleotettix is a genus of cave/camel crickets in the subfamily Macropathinae established by Chopard in 1944.

Three species have been described in this genus: Speleotettix tindalei Chopard found on the Limestone Coast of South Australia, Speleotettix flindersensis (Chopard) on Flinders Island, and Speleotettix chopardi (Karny) in Victoria's Dandenong Ranges.

Speleotettix chopardi was originally described in the New Zealand genus Pachyrhamma before being transferred to Speleotettix by Chopard in 1944.
