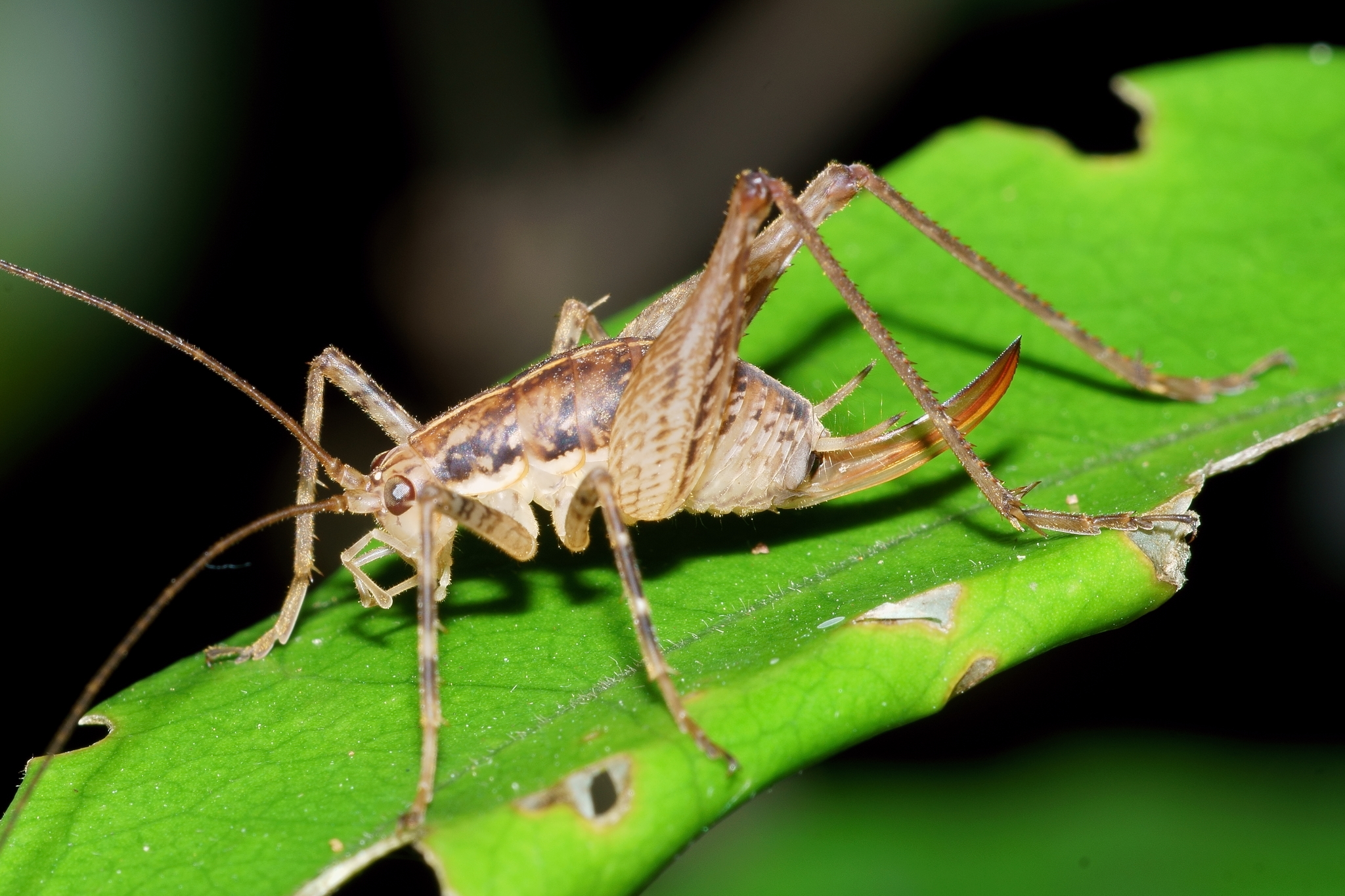
- Neonetus variegatus

Scientific classification
- Kingdom: Animalia
- Phylum: Arthropoda
- Clade: Pancrustacea
- Class: Insecta
- Order: Orthoptera
- Suborder: Ensifera
- Family: Rhaphidophoridae
- Subfamily: Macropathinae
- Genus: Neonetus; Brunner von Wattenwyl, 1888

Species
- See text.

= Neonetus =

Genus of orthopteran insects

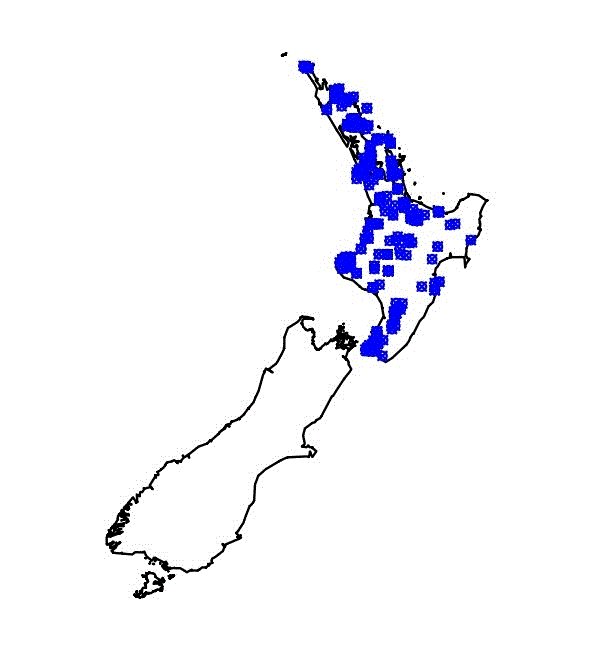
Observations of Neonetus and their distribution throughout New Zealand

Neonetus is a genus of cave wētā in the family Rhaphidophoridae, endemic to New Zealand. All described species are small; when adult, individuals are only about 1 cm long. Neonetus variegatus and N. huttoni are common in native and exotic forests but because they are small and nocturnal, they are often overlooked.

== Taxonomy ==
The genus Neonetus was established by Brunner von Wattenwyl in 1888.

== Biology ==
Neonetus are active at night when they are vulnerable to becoming food for rats and kiwi.

== Distribution ==
Current observational data suggests that Neonetus is restricted to the North Island of New Zealand.

== Species ==
- Neonetus huttoni Chopard, 1923
- Neonetus pilosus (Hutton, 1904)
- Talitropsis/Neonetus poduroides (Walker, 1869)
- Neonetus variegatus Brunner, 1888
