= Ischyroplectron =

Scientific classification
- Kingdom: Animalia
- Phylum: Arthropoda
- Clade: Pancrustacea
- Class: Insecta
- Order: Orthoptera
- Suborder: Ensifera
- Family: Rhaphidophoridae
- Genus: Ischyroplectron; Hutton, 1897
- Species: I. isolatum

Binomial name
- Ischyroplectron isolatum Hutton, 1897

Genus of orthopteran insects

Ischyroplectron is a monotypic genus of wētā containing the species Ischyroplectron isolatum. I isolatum or the Bounty Island wētā, is a cave wētā in the family Rhaphidophoridae, endemic to Bounty Island of New Zealand. It is found under rocks.
