= Rhaphidophora (insect) =

Scientific classification
- Kingdom: Animalia
- Phylum: Arthropoda
- Class: Insecta
- Order: Orthoptera
- Suborder: Ensifera
- Family: Rhaphidophoridae
- Tribe: Rhaphidophorini
- Genus: Rhaphidophora; Serville, 1838

Type species
- Rhaphidophora picea Serville, 1838

Synonyms
- Raphidophora Scudder, 1861; Rhadiphora Lucas, 1857; Rhaphidophorus Haan, 1843

Genus of cricket-like animals

Rhaphidophora is the type genus of camel crickets belonging to the taxonomic tribe Rhaphidophorini. They can be found in India, China, Japan, Indo-China, Malesia, and Australasia.

They are entirely wingless with flattened bodies and a convex dorsal surface. Their legs are relatively slender.

== Taxonomy ==
=== Species ===
This is a large genus containing over 100 described species. As of August 2024, the following species are accepted:

1. Rhaphidophora abramovi Gorochov, 2012
2. Rhaphidophora acutelaminata Chopard, 1916
3. Rhaphidophora amboinensis Karny, 1930
4. Rhaphidophora angulata Ingrisch, 2002
5. Rhaphidophora angustifrons Chopard, 1940
6. Rhaphidophora arsentiji Gorochov, 2002
7. Rhaphidophora baeri Bolívar, 1890
8. Rhaphidophora banarensis Gorochov, 1999
9. Rhaphidophora baronciniturricchiae Di Russo & Rampini, 2017
10. Rhaphidophora beccarii Griffini, 1908
11. Rhaphidophora beta Karny, 1930
12. Rhaphidophora bicornuta Karny, 1937
13. Rhaphidophora bidoup Gorochov, 2012
14. Rhaphidophora biprocera Bian, Zhu & Shi, 2017
15. Rhaphidophora bokor Gorochov, 2012
16. Rhaphidophora brevicauda Karny, 1924
17. Rhaphidophora brevipes Karny, 1924
18. Rhaphidophora caligulata Zacher, 1909
19. Rhaphidophora cambodia Gorochov, 2012
20. Rhaphidophora cavernicola Chopard, 1916
21. Rhaphidophora chopardi Karny, 1924
22. Rhaphidophora collina Gorochov, 2013
23. Rhaphidophora complanatis Lu & Bian, 2022
24. Rhaphidophora crassicornis Brunner von Wattenwyl, 1888
25. Rhaphidophora curta Gorochov, 2013
26. Rhaphidophora curup Gorochov, 2013
27. Rhaphidophora dammermani Karny, 1924
28. Rhaphidophora dehaani Karny, 1920
29. Rhaphidophora deusta Brunner von Wattenwyl, 1888
30. Rhaphidophora digitata Lu & Bian, 2022
31. Rhaphidophora doloduo Gorochov, 2013
32. Rhaphidophora duxiu Lu & Bian, 2022
33. Rhaphidophora exigua Gorochov, 2002
34. Rhaphidophora fedorenkoi Gorochov, 2012
35. Rhaphidophora furcifera Gorochov, 2013
36. Rhaphidophora fusca Gorochov, 2012
37. Rhaphidophora gracilis Brunner von Wattenwyl, 1888
38. Rhaphidophora iliai Gorochov, 2002
39. Rhaphidophora incilis Bian, Zhu & Shi, 2017
40. Rhaphidophora indica Gorochov, 2013
41. Rhaphidophora insularis Gorochov, 2013
42. Rhaphidophora invalida Gorochov, 1999
43. Rhaphidophora ivani Gorochov, 1999
44. Rhaphidophora jambi Gorochov, 2002
45. Rhaphidophora khmerica Gorochov, 2013
46. Rhaphidophora kinabaluensis Karny, 1926
47. Rhaphidophora lampung Gorochov, 2013
48. Rhaphidophora lao Gorochov, 2012
49. Rhaphidophora lobulata Gorochov, 2013
50. Rhaphidophora longa Gorochov, 2002
51. Rhaphidophora longicauda Ander, 1932
52. Rhaphidophora longitabula Bian, Zhu & Shi, 2017
53. Rhaphidophora lorelindu Gorochov, 2013
54. Rhaphidophora loricata (Burmeister, 1838)
  - type species (as R. picea Serville, 1838)
55. Rhaphidophora magna Gorochov, 2012
56. Rhaphidophora malayensis Gorochov, 1999
57. Rhaphidophora mariae Gorochov, 1999
58. Rhaphidophora marmorata Karny, 1924
59. Rhaphidophora mindoro Gorochov, 2013
60. Rhaphidophora minicauda Gorochov, 2013
61. Rhaphidophora minuolamella Liu & Zhang, 2002
62. Rhaphidophora mohanensis Lu & Bian, 2022
63. Rhaphidophora mulmeinensis Chopard, 1916
64. Rhaphidophora mutica Brunner von Wattenwyl, 1888
65. Rhaphidophora negaraensis Gorochov, 1999
66. Rhaphidophora neglecta Karny, 1930
67. Rhaphidophora obesa Karny, 1924
68. Rhaphidophora obtuselaminata Karny, 1924
69. Rhaphidophora oophaga Chopard, 1959
70. Rhaphidophora pahangensis Gorochov, 1999
71. Rhaphidophora pangrango Gorochov, 2002
72. Rhaphidophora parvicauda Gorochov, 2013
73. Rhaphidophora phusoy Gorochov, 2012
74. Rhaphidophora ponapensis Vickery & Kevan, 1999
75. Rhaphidophora pubescens Ander, 1932
76. Rhaphidophora quadridentata Qin, Jiang, Liu & Li, 2018
77. Rhaphidophora quadrispina Liu & Bian, 2021
78. Rhaphidophora quadrula Bian, Zhu & Shi, 2017
79. Rhaphidophora raoan Gorochov, 2012
80. Rhaphidophora rasilis Gorochov, 2002
81. Rhaphidophora rechingeri Holdhaus, 1909
82. Rhaphidophora recta Gorochov, 2002
83. Rhaphidophora rhombica Gorochov, 2012
84. Rhaphidophora rhombifera Gorochov, 2013
85. Rhaphidophora rongshuiensis Lu & Bian, 2022
86. Rhaphidophora rufobrunnea Chopard, 1921
87. Rhaphidophora sarasini Karny, 1931
88. Rhaphidophora setiformis Qin, Jiang, Liu & Li, 2018
89. Rhaphidophora shii Lu & Bian, 2022
90. Rhaphidophora sichuanensis Liu & Zhang, 2002
91. Rhaphidophora simillima Gorochov, 2012
92. Rhaphidophora simulata Gorochov, 2013
93. Rhaphidophora sinica Bey-Bienko, 1962
94. Rhaphidophora songbaensis Gorochov, 1999
95. Rhaphidophora spinifera Gorochov, 2013
96. Rhaphidophora spinita Lu & Bian, 2022
97. Rhaphidophora stridulans Ingrisch, 2006
98. Rhaphidophora taiwana Shiraki, 1930
99. Rhaphidophora tamanensis Gorochov, 1999
100. Rhaphidophora testacea Ander, 1932
101. Rhaphidophora thaiensis Gorochov, 1999
102. Rhaphidophora trat Gorochov, 2012
103. Rhaphidophora vangheua Gorochov, 2012
104. Rhaphidophora vasiliji Gorochov, 1999
105. Rhaphidophora vietensis Gorochov, 1999
106. Rhaphidophora wasile Gorochov, 2013
107. Rhaphidophora wuasa Gorochov, 2013
108. Rhaphidophora wuzhishanensis Qin, Jiang, Liu & Li, 2018
109. Rhaphidophora xishuang Gorochov, 2012
