= Insulanoplectron =

Scientific classification
- Kingdom: Animalia
- Phylum: Arthropoda
- Class: Insecta
- Order: Orthoptera
- Suborder: Ensifera
- Family: Rhaphidophoridae
- Subfamily: Macropathinae
- Tribe: Macropathini
- Genus: Insulanoplectron; Richards, 1970
- Species: I. spinosum

Binomial name
- Insulanoplectron spinosum Richards, 1970

Genus of orthopteran insects

Insulanoplectron is a genus of cave wētā in the family Rhaphidophoridae, with just two species: the Snares Island Wētā and the Tin tokoriro from Rakiura. Insulanoplectron spinosum is endemic to the subantartic Snares Island where it is considered to be naturally uncommon. Insulanoplectron stanneum is known from a single disused mineshaft on Rakiura/Stewart Island, New Zealand. Rhaphidophoridae are nocturnal crickets often found in caves, all around the world. During the day on the Snares, wētā can be found hiding in seabird burrows.

== Taxonomy ==
Cave wētā were found on Snares Island in 1947 by R. A. Falla and C. A. Fleming. Detailed inferences could not be made about the species, as not many individuals had been found. In 1970, sufficient evidence had been collected, leading to I. spinosum being placed in a monophyletic group by Aola M. Richards. Richards noted that I. spinosum was distinct from other subantarctic Rhaphidophorids but shared traits with other species in New Zealand. A new species discovered on Rakiura/Stewart Island in 2018 was described Insulanoplectron stanneum in 2026. Because the only know location for this species is inside an old tin mine on the Tin Range, the species is called 'stanneus' meaning ‘made out of tin’

== Distribution ==
Insulanoplectron spinosum is restricted to the Snares Island which lies 105 km to the south of Stewart Island. Insulanoplectron stanneum is restricted to the Tin Range on Rakiura/Stewart Island, New Zealand

== Morphology ==
Although Insulanoplectron is distinct from other Rhaphidophoridae it has similarities in genital structure with Ischyroplectron hutton, another subantarctic weta. Insulanoplectron spinosum are dark brown in colour with light brown bands around the body, and an ovipositor that is reddish brown colour. Female Insulanoplectron spinosum adults are larger than males. Body length of adult males is around 14mm while female body length varies between 17 - 18mm. Between the beginning (egg) and final life stages (adult) there are several instar stages that individuals need to moult to allow for features to transition from being juvenile to those of an adult. Male I. spinosum have eight instar stages, while females have nine of these pre-adult instar stages.

== Diet ==
Analysis of I. spinosum diet found that individuals consumed a variety of plants, invertebrates and one vertebrate species. Plants found in the crop of male and female individuals of varying ages was determined to be a combination of algae, vascular plants, and fungi. While invertebrates detected in captured wētā include: Isopoda, Collembola, Tenebrionidae, Lepidoptera, Muscidae. In both male and female wētā Aves had been detected in all individuals regardless of age, this was determined to be seabird carcass. Individuals of I. spinosum have been observed to cannibalise other individuals who are smaller, lethargic, or are missing appendages.

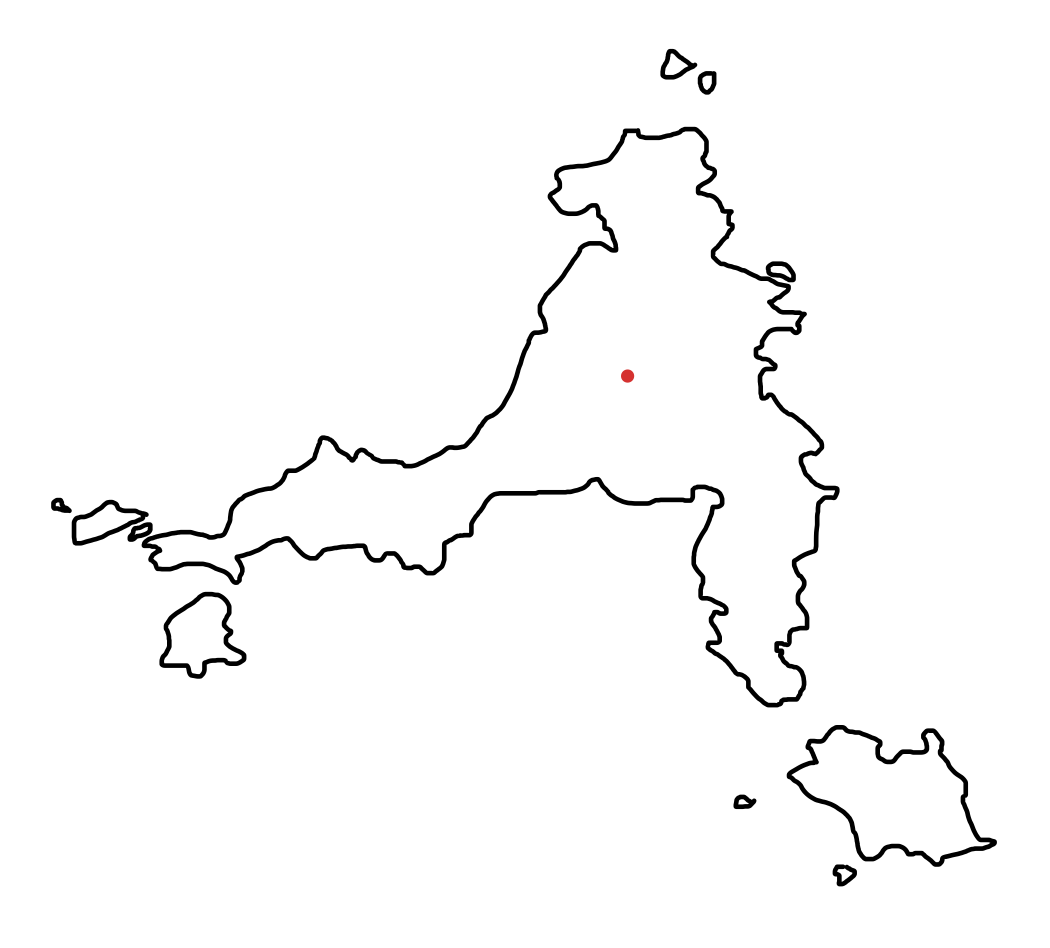
Observations of Insulanoplectron spinosum (red dot) on Snares Island, from iNaturalist (as of September, 2023).
