= Aola Richards =

New Zealand entomologist (1927–2021)

- Dr Richards in northern Canterbury with a giant wētā
- Born: 16 December 1927; Wellington
- Died: 2 November 2021 (aged 93); London
- Education: University of New Zealand
- Scientific career
- Fields: Entomology

Aola Mary Richards (16 December 1927 – 2 November 2021) was a New Zealand entomologist specialising in the study of New Zealand and Australian cave crickets, or wētā (Rhaphidophoridae), and Australian ladybird beetles (Coccinellidae). She was the first New Zealand woman to gain a PhD in biology.

== Early life ==
Richards was born in Wellington, New Zealand. She was the only child of Hinemoa C C Hopkins, a lawyer, and David James Richards, a university mathematics professor from Wales. Richards' parents were married for only a few years before separating. Richards attended Queen Margaret's College then Samuel Marsden Collegiate School for Girls in Wellington. She gained First Class MSc in Zoology in 1954 from the University of New Zealand. Richards was then awarded a New Zealand University research fund fellowship, and in 1958 she became the first woman in New Zealand to gain a PhD in biological science.

== Career ==
Richards worked at the Plant Diseases Division of the New Zealand Department of Scientific and Industrial Research in Auckland before moving to Australia. She worked within the Biology Department of the University of New South Wales for 33 years.

Richards published more than 80 papers, many of them taxonomic revisions and species descriptions as the sole author. Her most cited works are on the life history and feeding biology of beetles and wētā.

Richards' PhD research initiated her love of caves and the fauna that lives in caves. This led to field work across Australia and Europe and involvement in speleological societies. Along with Ted Lane she was the founding editor of Helictite, the newsletter of the Australian Speleological Federation, providing a news service and collection of speleological papers. Richards inspired the study of the animals that live in caves in Tasmania and her species descriptions contributed to conservation efforts.

Richards made a major contribution to the taxonomy of New Zealand and Australian Rhaphidophoridae (cave crickets/wētā). She described five genera from New Zealand and more than twenty new species comprising almost all of the known Australian taxa. A cave wētā species was named for her in 2018, Miotopus richardsae.

In Australia, Richards also studied ladybird beetles. Her taxonomic work is highly cited and her studies of feeding biology revealed novel plant-insect interactions. Richards and her colleague Filewood were the first to describe how beetles can avoid toxic plant compounds by chewing through the leafstalk of their food plant. Referred to as "trench warfare", this behaviour allows ladybird beetles to isolate a region of the plant, preventing toxic plant compounds reaching them.

Richards died in late 2021 at the age of 93. She bequeathed $13 million to biology departments at two Universities: The University of Sydney and Victoria University of Wellington.

== Selected publications ==
- Richards, A. M. (1983). "The Epilachna vigintiotopunctata complex (Coleoptera: Coccinellidae)." International Journal of Entomology . 25(1): 11–41.
- Richards, A. M. (1981). "Rhyzobius ventralis (Erichson) and R. forestieri (Mulsant) (Coleoptera: Coccinellidae), their biology and value for scale insect control." Bulletin of Entomological Research. 71(1): 33–46. DOI: https://doi.org/10.1017/S0007485300051002
- Richards, A. M. (1973). "A comparative study of the biology of the Giant wetas Deinacrida heteracantha and D. fallai (Orthoptera: Henicidae) from New Zealand." Journal of Zoology. 169(2): 195–236.
- Richards A. M. (1971). "An ecological study of the cavernicolous fauna of the Nullarbor Plain Southern Australia." Journal of Zoology. 164(1): 1–60.
