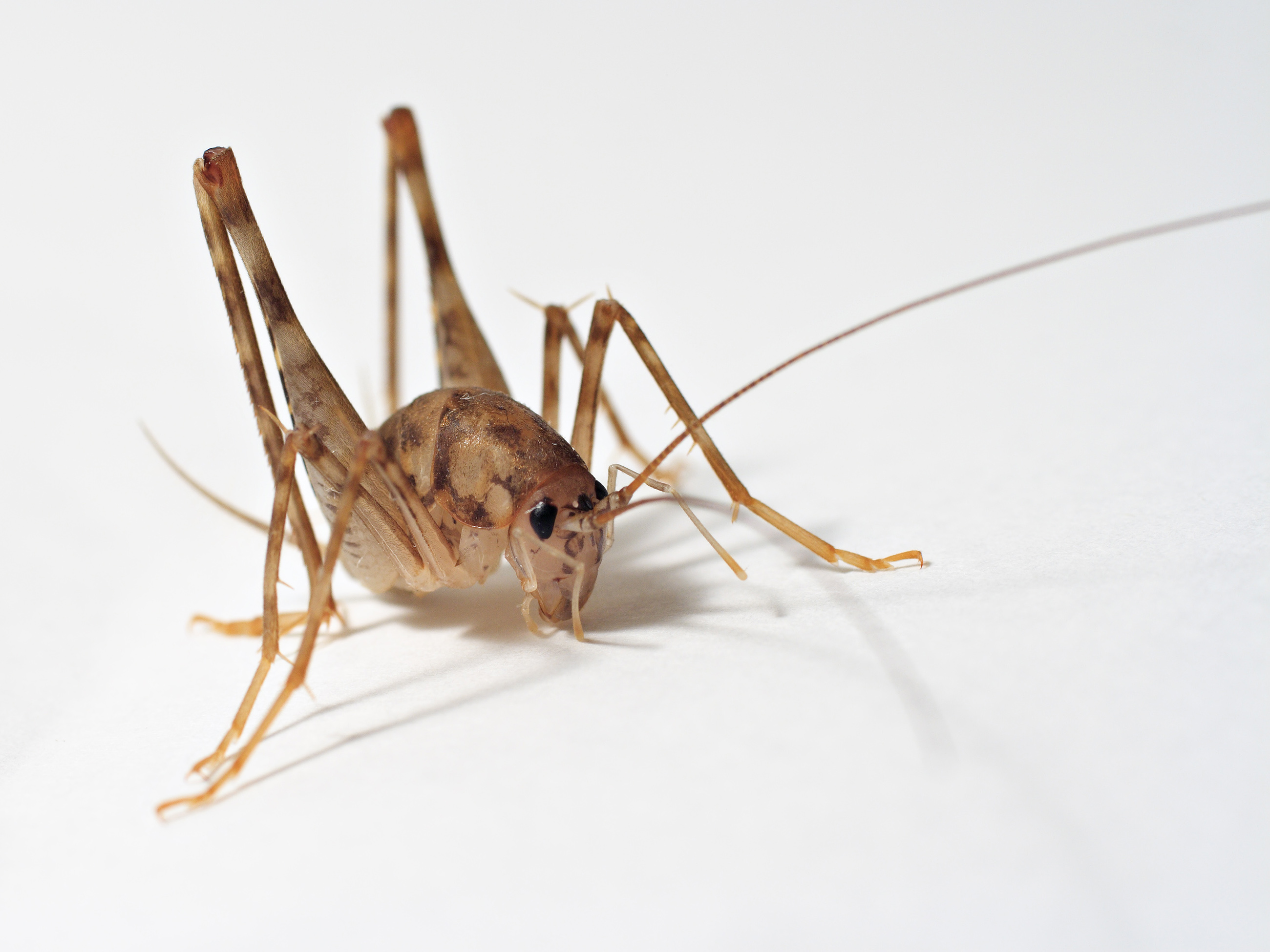
- A Greenhouse camel cricket

Scientific classification
- Kingdom: Animalia
- Phylum: Arthropoda
- Clade: Pancrustacea
- Class: Insecta
- Order: Orthoptera
- Suborder: Ensifera
- Superfamily: Rhaphidophoroidea; Walker, 1869
- Family: Rhaphidophoridae; Walker, 1869

Subfamilies and genera
- See text

= Rhaphidophoridae =

Family of insects

The orthopteran family Rhaphidophoridae of the suborder Ensifera has a worldwide distribution. Common names for these insects include cave crickets, camel crickets, spider crickets (sometimes shortened to "criders" or "sprickets"), and sand treaders. Those occurring in New Zealand are typically referred to as jumping or cave wētā. Most are found in forest environments or within caves, animal burrows, cellars, under stones, or in wood or similar environments. All species are flightless and nocturnal, usually with long antennae and legs. More than 500 species of Rhaphidophoridae are described.

The well-known field crickets are from a different superfamily (Grylloidea) and only look vaguely similar, while members of the family Tettigoniidae may look superficially similar in body form.

== Description ==
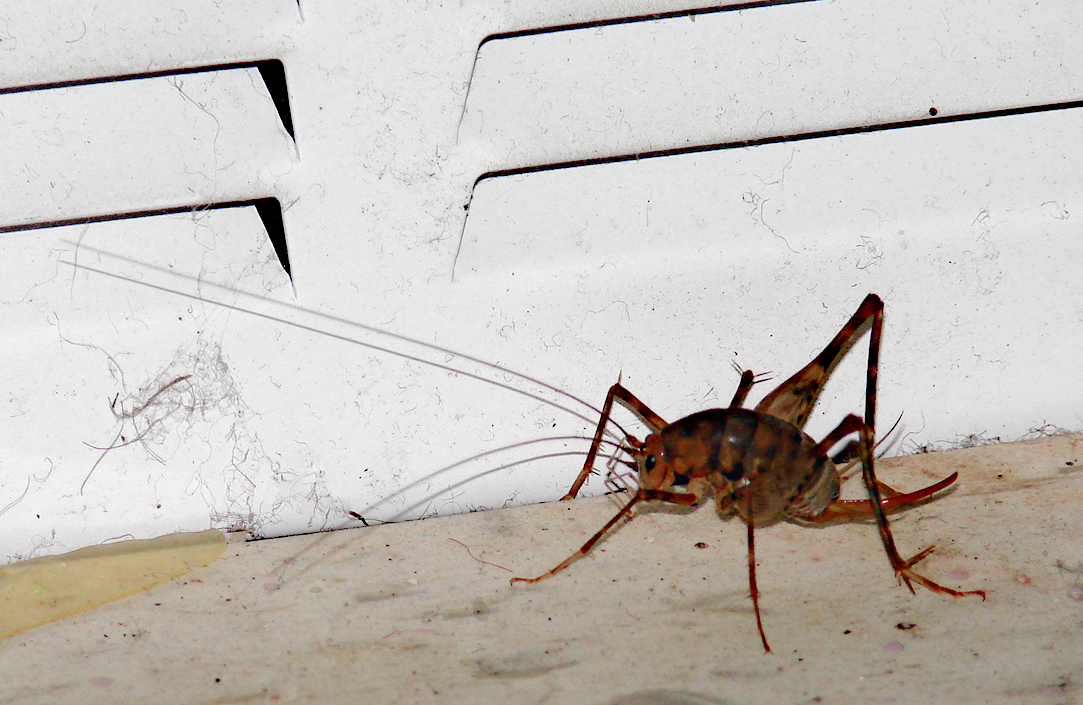
Camel cricket (Tachycines asynamorus)

Most cave crickets have very large hind legs with "drumstick-shaped" femora and equally long, thin tibiae, and long, slender antennae. The antennae arise closely and next to each other on the head. They are brownish in color and rather humpbacked in appearance, always wingless, and up to 5 cm (2.0 in) long in body and 10 cm (3.9 in) for the legs. The bodies of early instars may appear translucent.

As their name suggests, cave crickets are commonly found in caves or old mines. Some inhabit other cool, damp environments such as rotten logs, stumps and hollow trees, and under damp leaves, stones, boards, and logs. Occasionally, they prove to be a nuisance in the basements of homes in suburban areas, drains, sewers, wells, and firewood stacks. One species from Asia, the greenhouse camel cricket, has become a tramp species now found in hothouses in Europe and North America. Some reach into alpine areas and live close to permanent ice, such as the Mount Cook "flea" (Pharmacus montanus) and its relatives in New Zealand.

== Subfamilies and genera ==
=== Aemodogryllinae ===
Genera include:

- tribe Aemodogryllini Jacobson, 1905 – Asia (Korea, Indochina, Russia, China), Europe
  - Diestrammena Brunner von Wattenwyl, 1888
  - Tachycines Adelung, 1902
- tribe Diestramimini Gorochov, 1998 – India, southern China, Indochina
  - Diestramima Storozhenko, 1990
  - Gigantettix Gorochov, 1998

=== Anoplophilinae ===
Genera include:

- Alpinanoplophilus Ishikawa, 1993 – Japan
- Anoplophilus Karny, 1931 – Japan and Korea

=== Ceuthophilinae ===
cave crickets, camel crickets and sand treaders: North America
Genera include:

- tribe Argyrtini Saussure & Pictet, 1897
  - Anargyrtes Hubbell, 1972
  - Argyrtes Saussure & Pictet, 1897
  - Leptargyrtes Hubbell, 1972
- tribe Ceuthophilini Tepper, 1892
  - Ceuthophilus Scudder, 1863
  - Macrobaenetes Tinkham, 1962
  - Rhachocnemis Caudell, 1916
  - Styracosceles Hubbell, 1936
  - Typhloceuthophilus Hubbell, 1940
  - Udeopsylla Scudder, 1863
  - Utabaenetes Tinkham, 1970
- tribe Daihiniini Karny, 1930
  - Ammobaenetes Hubbell, 1936
  - Daihinia Haldeman, 1850
  - Daihinibaenetes Tinkham, 1962
  - Daihiniella Hubbell, 1936
  - Daihiniodes Hebard, 1929
  - Phrixocnemis Scudder, 1894
- tribe Hadenoecini Ander, 1939 – North America
  - Euhadenoecus Hubbell, 1978
  - Hadenoecus Scudder, 1863
- tribe Pristoceuthophilini Rehn, 1903
  - Exochodrilus Hubbell, 1972
  - Farallonophilus Rentz, 1972
  - Pristoceuthophilus Rehn, 1903
  - Salishella Hebard, 1939

=== Dolichopodainae ===
cave crickets: southern Europe, western Asia

- Dolichopoda Bolivar, 1880

=== Gammarotettiginae ===
Auth. Karny, 1937 – North America

- tribe Gammarotettigini Karny, 1937
  - Gammarotettix Brunner von Wattenwyll, 1888

=== Macropathinae ===
Gondwanan cave crickets

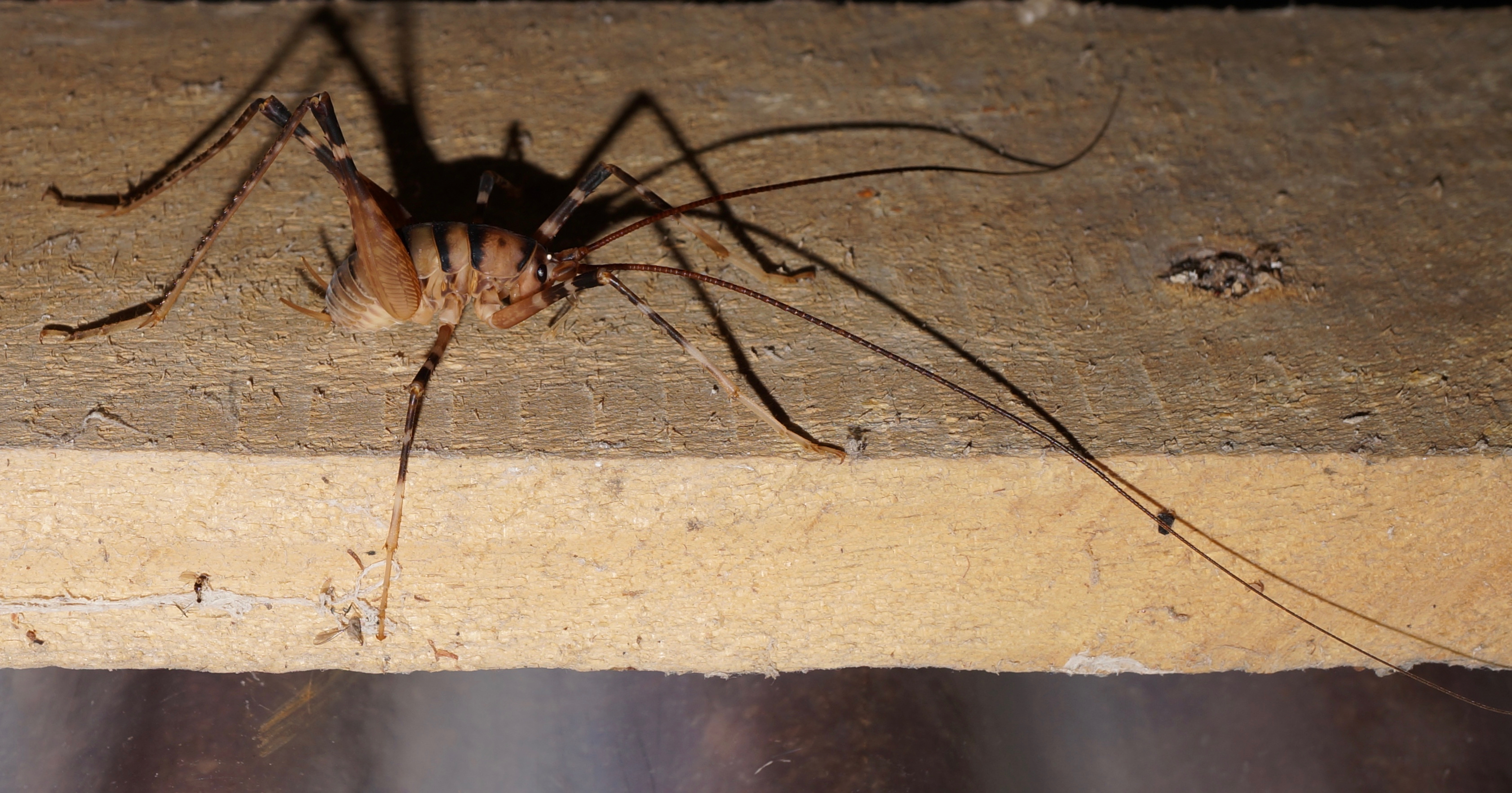
Pachyrhamma edwardsii from New Zealand

Genera include:

- tribe Macropathini Karny, 1930 – Australia, New Zealand, South America, South Africa, the Falkland Islands
  - Australotettix Richards, 1964 – Australia (Queensland, New South Wales)
  - Cavernotettix Richards, 1966 – Australia (New South Wales, Victoria, Tasmania)
  - Crux Trewick, 2024 - New Zealand
  - Dendroplectron Richards, 1964 – New Zealand
  - Eburnocauda Beasley-Hall & Iannello, 2024 – Australia (Victoria)
  - Heteromallus Brunner von Wattenwyll, 1888 – South America
  - Insulanoplectron Richards, 1970 – New Zealand
  - Ischyroplectron Hutton, 1896 – New Zealand
  - Isoplectron Hutton, 1896 – New Zealand
  - Macropathus Walker, 1869 – New Zealand
  - Maotoweta Johns & Cook, 2014 – New Zealand
  - Micropathus Richards, 1964 – Australia (Tasmania)
  - Miotopus Hutton, 1898 – New Zealand
  - Neonetus Brunner von Wattenwyll, 1888 – New Zealand
  - Notoplectron Richards, 1964 – New Zealand
  - Novoplectron Richards, 1966 – New Zealand
  - Novotettix Richards, 1966 – Australia (South Australia)
  - Occultastella Trewick, 2024 - New Zealand
  - Pachyrhamma Brunner von Wattenwyll, 1888 – New Zealand
  - Pallidoplectron Richards, 1958 – New Zealand
  - Pallidotettix Richards, 1968 – Australia (South Australia, Western Australia)
  - Paraneonetus Salmon, 1958 – New Zealand
  - Parudenus Enderlein, 1910 – South America
  - Pharmacus Pictet & Saussure, 1893 – New Zealand
  - Pleioplectron Hutton, 1896 – New Zealand
  - Praecantrix Hegg, Morgan-Richards & Trewick 2024 – New Zealand
  - Spelaeiacris Peringuey, 1916 – South Africa
  - Speleotettix Chopard, 1944 – Australia (South Australia, Victoria)
  - Tasmanoplectron Richards, 1971 – Australia (Tasmania)
  - Udenus Brunner von Wattenwyll, 1900– South America

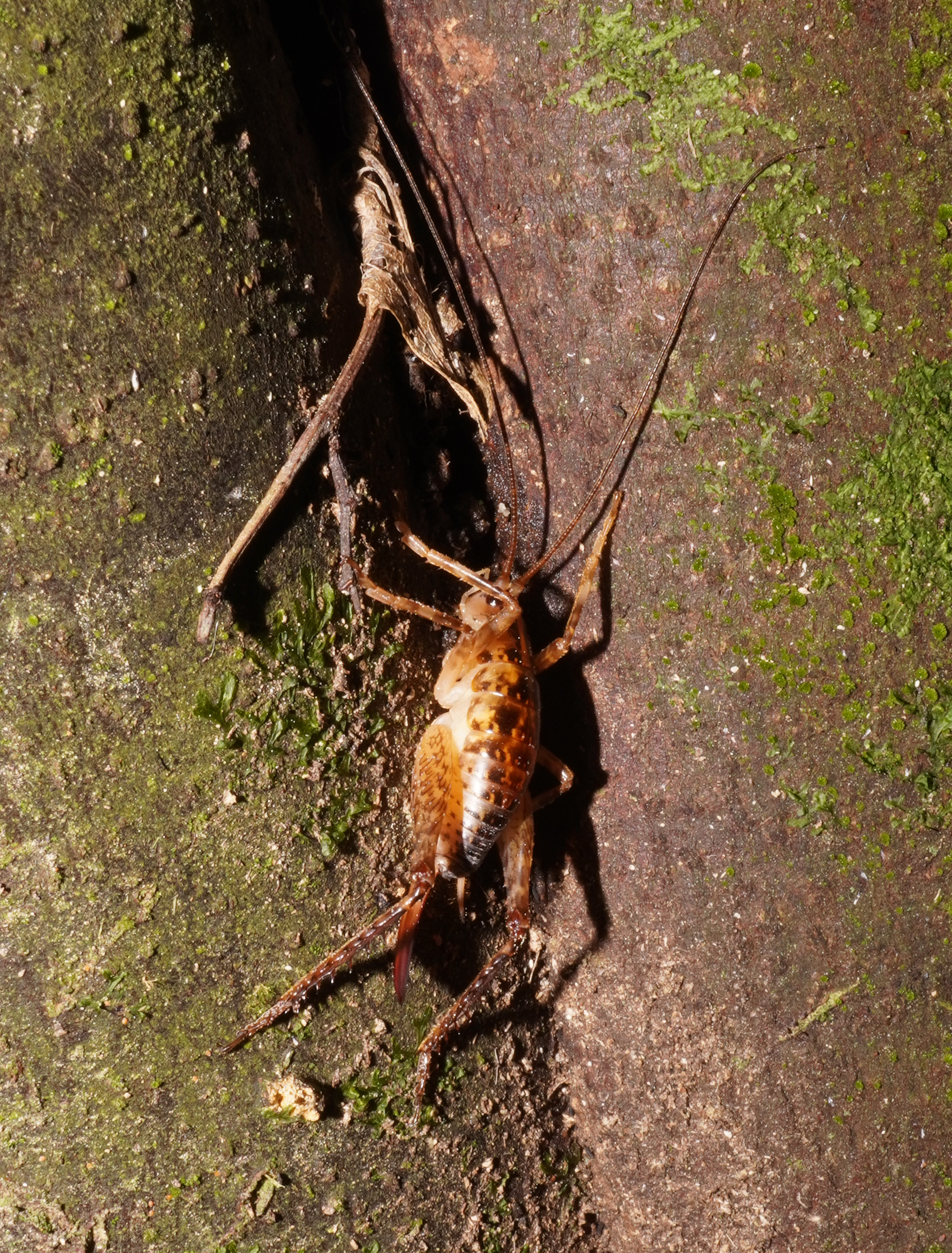
Talitropsis sedilloti

- tribe Talitropsini Gorochov, 1988
  - Talitropsis Bolivar, 1882 – New Zealand

=== † Protroglophilinae ===
- † Prorhaphidophora Chopard, 1936
- † Protroglophilus Gorochov, 1989

=== Rhaphidophorinae ===
Genera include:

- tribe Rhaphidophorini Walker, 1869 – India, southern China, Japan, Indochina, Malaysia, Australasia
  - Eurhaphidophora Gorochov, 1999
  - Rhaphidophora Serville, 1838
  - Stonychophora Karny, 1934

=== Troglophilinae ===
cave crickets: the Mediterranean region

- Troglophilus Krauss, 1879

=== Tropidischiinae ===
camel crickets: Canada

- Tropidischia Scudder, 1869

An as-yet-unnamed genus was discovered within a cave in Grand Canyon–Parashant National Monument, on the Utah/Arizona border, in 2005. Its most distinctive characteristic is that it has functional grasping cerci on its posterior.

== Ecology ==
Their distinctive limbs and antennae serve a double purpose. Typically living in a lightless environment, or active at night, they rely heavily on their sense of touch, which is limited by reach. While they have been known to take up residence in the basements of buildings, many cave crickets live out their entire lives deep inside caves. In those habitats, they sometimes face long spans of time with insufficient access to nutrients. Given their limited vision, cave crickets often jump to avoid predation. Those species of Rhaphidophoridae that have been studied are primarily scavengers, eating plant, animal, and fungi material. Although they look intimidating, they are completely harmless.

The group known as "sand treaders" is restricted to sand dunes, and are adapted to live in this environment. They are active only at night, and spend the day burrowed into the sand to minimize water loss. In the large sand dunes of California and Utah, they serve as food for scorpions and at least one specialized bird, LeConte's thrasher (Toxostoma lecontei). The thrasher roams the dunes looking for the tell-tale debris of the diurnal hiding place and excavates the sand treaders (the range of bird is in the Mojave and Colorado Deserts in the U.S.).

== Interactions with humans ==
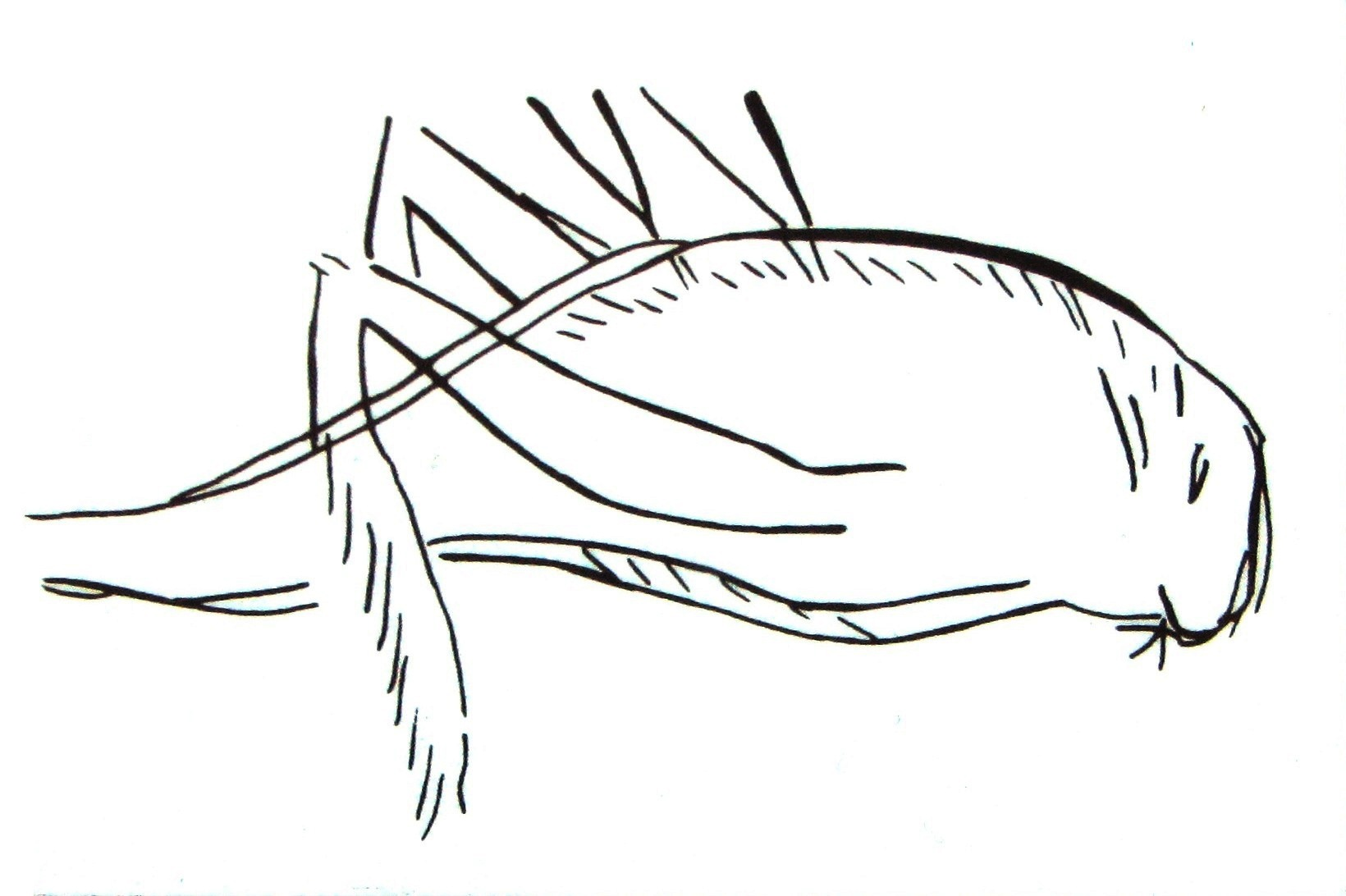
Drawing of the cave cricket engraving

Cave and camel crickets are of little economic importance except as a nuisance in buildings and homes, especially basements. They are usually "accidental invaders" that wander in from adjacent areas. They may reproduce indoors, and are seen in dark, moist conditions such as a basement, shower, or laundry area, as well as in organic debris (e.g., compost heaps) that serve as food. They are fairly common invaders of homes in Hokkaido and other chilly regions in Japan. They are called kamado-uma or colloquially benjo korogi (便所コオロギ, literally, "toilet cricket").

A representation of a female from the Troglophilus genus has been found engraved on a bison bone in the Cave of the Trois-Frères, showing that they were likely already present around humans, maybe as pets or pests, in caves inhabited by prehistoric populations in the Magdalenian.
