= Carter Caves State Resort Park =

State park in Kentucky, US

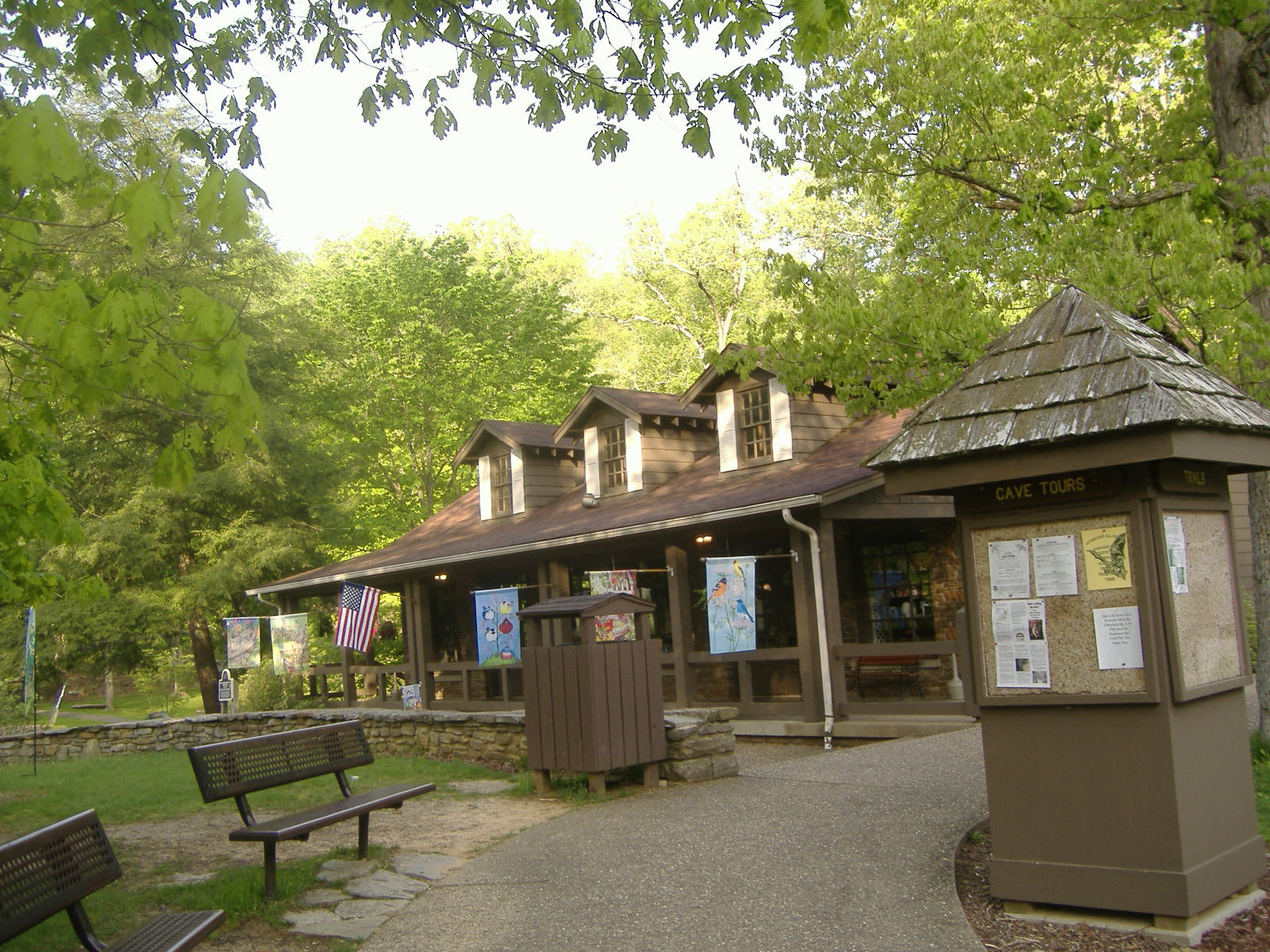
- Visitor Center

- Location within Kentucky Location within the United States
- Type: Kentucky state park
- Location: Carter County, Kentucky
- Coordinates: 38°22′26″N 83°07′20″W
- Area: 2,000 acres (810 ha)
- Elevation: 1,040 feet (320 m)
- Created: 1946
- Operator: Kentucky Department of Parks
- Open: March 1st to Nov 1st
- Website: parks.ky.gov/parks/resortparks/carter-caves/

Carter Caves State Resort Park is located in Carter County, Kentucky, United States, along Tygarts Creek. It is formed by Carter Caves, and nearby Cascade Caves, which were added to the park in 1959. On December 16, 1981, 146 acres (59 ha) of the park were designated as nature preserves. Bat Cave and Cascade Caverns State Nature Preserves were dedicated for the protection of the Indiana bat, mountain maple, and Canada yew, all endangered species.

== History ==
The park was in various private hands for almost 200 years until the last private family owners, the J.F. Lewis family and various other private investors, including local Rotary Clubs, donated the large tract of property (945 acres (382 ha)) to the Commonwealth of Kentucky in 1946. The purchase of the caves and surrounding land was driven by Governor William Jason Fields, a native of Carter County.

== Attractions ==
=== Resort park ===
Carter Caves is a state resort park that features a lodge, cottages, 18-hole putt-putt course, full-service campground (18 sites with sewer hook-ups), and 26 miles (42 km) of hiking trails, cave tours available year-round, and seasonal horse riding stables.

=== Caves ===
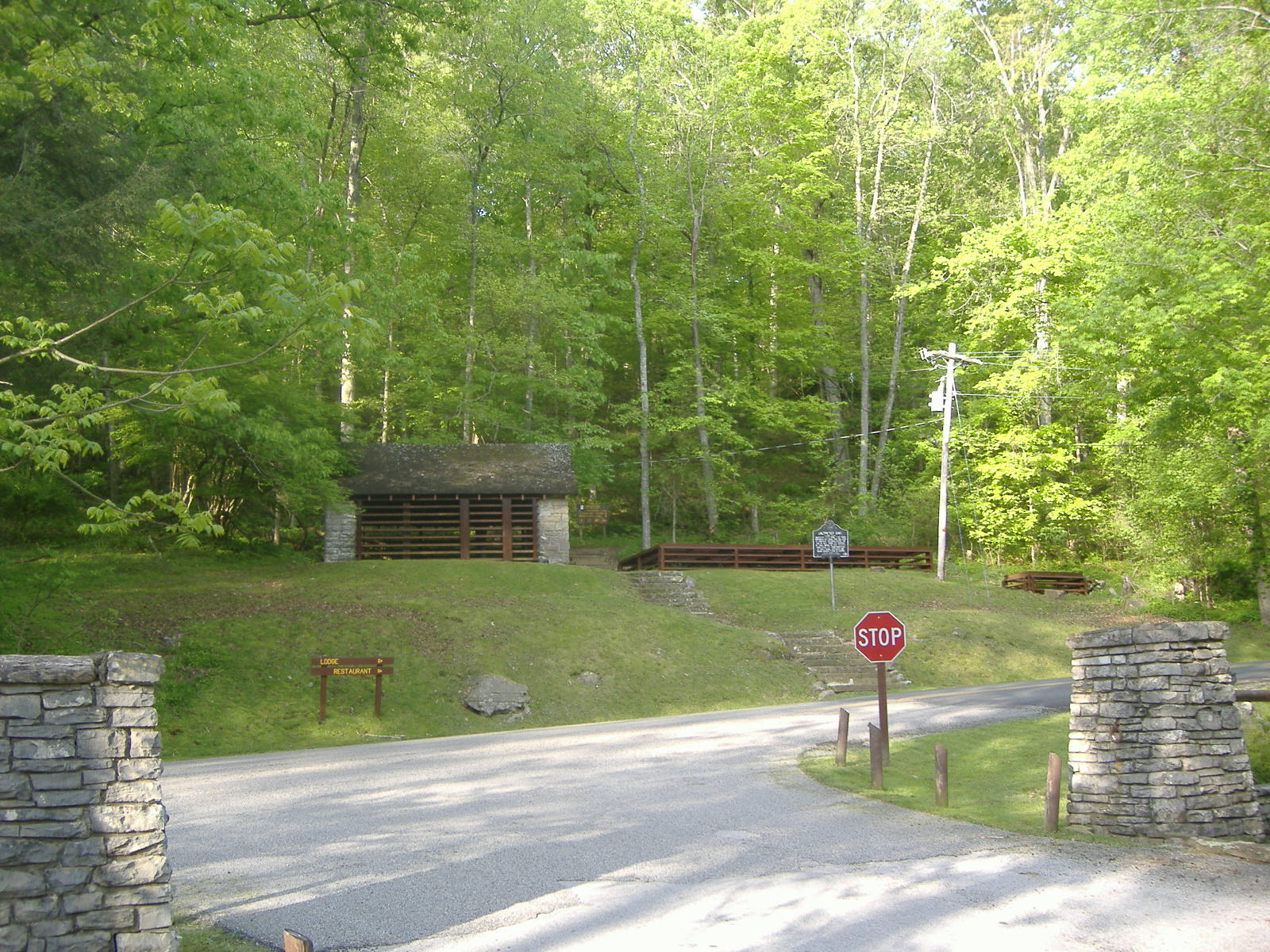
Saltpeter Cave

There are several cave tours offered. Guided tours of Cascade Cave and X-Cave are available year-round. Bat Cave and Saltpetre Cave are only open in the summer, and close during the winter hibernation season due to the threat of white nose syndrome, a disease which threatens several endangered species of bats.

Cascade Cave is the name for three different caves in the same area and is together the largest cave in the park. It features an underground lake room and an 30-foot (9.1 m) underground waterfall.

X Cave, named for the crossing pattern of its passages, features some of the largest rock formations in the park.

Saltpetre Cave was mined during the War of 1812 because saltpetre, or potassium nitrate, is a major component in gunpowder. Historic activities are a major part of the Saltpetre Cave tour. Bat Cave is also toured in the summer months, between Memorial Day and Labor Day, and is considered a "wild" cave tour since the cave has not been improved for walking tours. The cave is unique in that it is a hibernaculum for the endangered Indiana bat in the winter months.

Laurel Cave is the most visited of the non-commercial caves in the park, and contains some of the most interesting passages. Laurel Cave is open to the public during regular business hours in the summer months only (Memorial Day - Labor Day). All that is required is a permit available at the Welcome Center/Gift Shop. The permit gives you legal access to Laurel Cave (summer months only), Horn Hollow Caves and the connected Rimstone Cave.

=== Trails ===
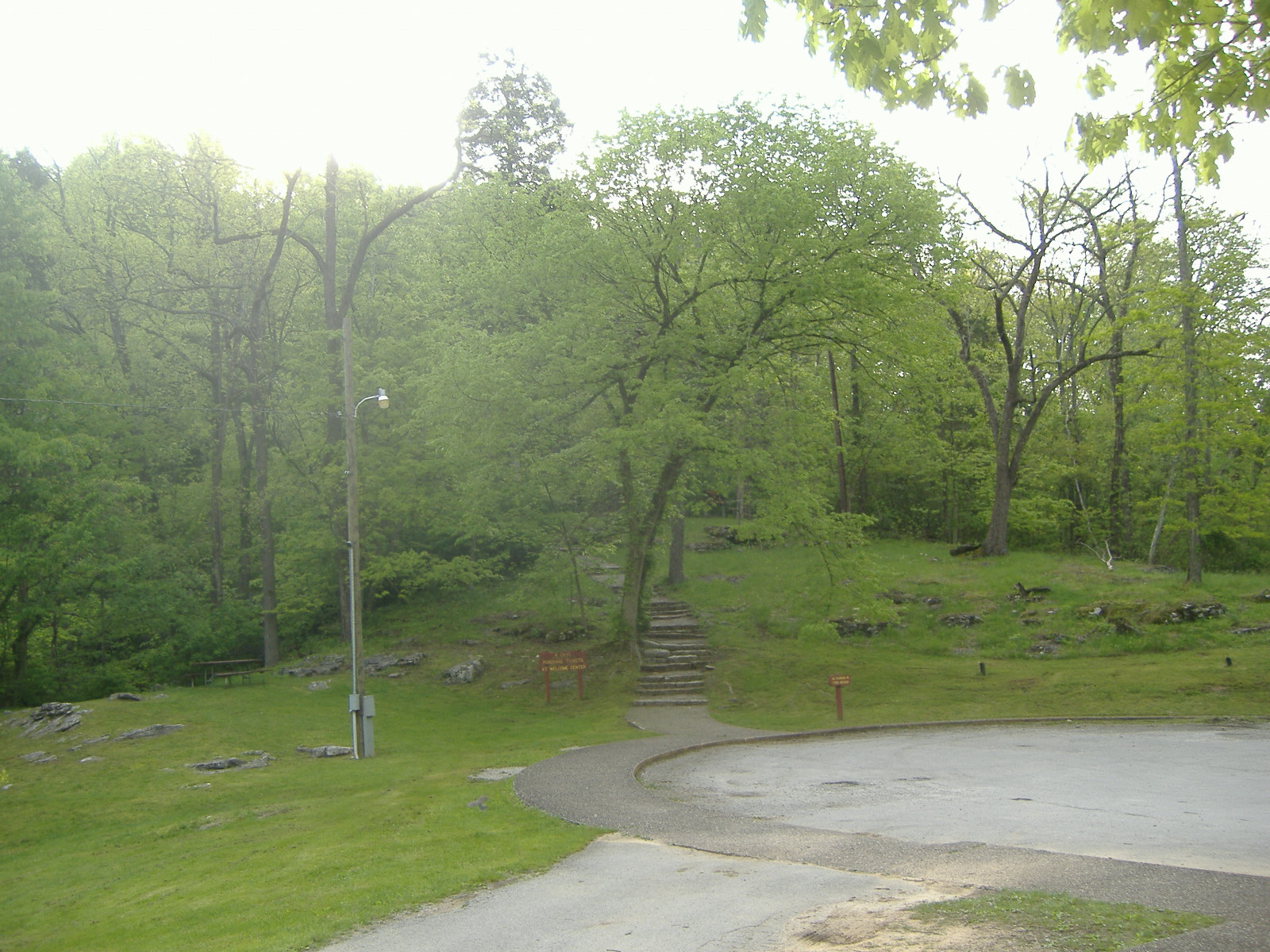
Trail leading to one of the many caves

Over thirty miles of hiking trails encounter seven natural bridges throughout the park. The Cascade Trail is a three-quarter mile trail passing through Box Canyon. The Three Bridges Trail winds three and a quarter miles and includes the park's largest natural bridge, the Smokey Bridge, which stands an impressive 90 feet (27 m) high and 120 feet (37 m) wide. This trail also passes by Fern Bridge and Raven Bridge as it meanders through the park. The half-mile Natural Bridge Trail passes beneath a third natural bridge, the only one in Kentucky that is paved and supports traffic. Longer trails include the 7.2-mile (11.6 km) Carter Caves Cross Country Trail (The 4Cs Trail) and the ten-mile (16 km) Kiser Hollow multi-access trail, which parallels the 4Cs trail for a couple of miles before encircling the outer boundaries of the park's property.

=== Smokey Valley Lake and Tygarts Creek ===
Smokey Valley Lake is a 45-acre (180,000 m^{2}) lake within the park. Anglers will find populations of largemouth bass, bluegill, catfish, and crappie in the lake. The boat is accessible by ramp, but no gasoline motors are permitted.

== Ecology ==
Formations in a Cascade Cave at Carter Caves State Resort Park, Kentucky, 2026

The cave system houses a variety of organisms including:

Agenus brunneus; Aleochara; Arrhopalites; Atheta; Batrisodes; Bembidion wingatei; Bufo americanus (American toad); Bufo woodhousei fowleri; Caecidotea; Cambarus tenebrosus; Ceuthophilus latens; Ceuthophilus stygius; Chelipoda; Clivina; Cottus; Crangonyx packardi; Dendrophilus; Dyschirius; Eptesicus fuscus; Erebomaster flavescens coecus; Erebomaster flavescens flavescens; Euhadenoecus puteanus; Eurycea lucifuga; Gammarus minus; Glischrochilus fasciatus; Gordius; Gyrinophilus porphyriticus duryi; Hadenoecus cumberlandicus; Hesperonemastoma inops; Hirundo rustica	Homaeotarsus; Lasiurus borealis (red bat); Leiobunum longipes; Leptocera tenebrarum; Lynx rufus; Megaselia cavernicola; Meta menardi (cave orb weaver); Mustela vison; Mycetophilidae; Myotis grisescens (gray bat); Myotis lucifugus; Myotis sodalis; Nemadus horni; Nematoda (roundworms); Nematomorpha (hairworms); Neotoma magister; Nesticus carteri; Omophron americanus; Onychiurus; Peromyscus leucopus; Petrochelidon pyrrhonota; Phanetta subterranea; Phylum platyhelminthes (flatworms); Pipistrellus subflavus; Plecotus rafinesquii; Plethodon glutinosus; Porhomma cavernicola; Prionochaeta opaca; Procyon lotor; Psephidonus	Pseudanophthalmus packardi; Pseudotremia carterensis; Pseudotremia cavernarum; Pseudotremia sodalis; Pseudotriton montanus diastictus; Pseudotriton ruber ruber; Psychoda; Ptenidium; Quedius; Rana catesbeiana (American bullfrog); Rana clamitans melanota; Sabacon cavicolens; Sayornis phoebe; Sciaridae; Scoliopteryx libatris; Scydmaenus; Semotilus atromaculatus; Sinella basidus; Sinella cavernarum; Sphalloplana; Stenus; Stygobromus; Tachinus; Terrapene carolina; Tomocerus bidentatus; Tomocerus flavescens

== Gallery ==
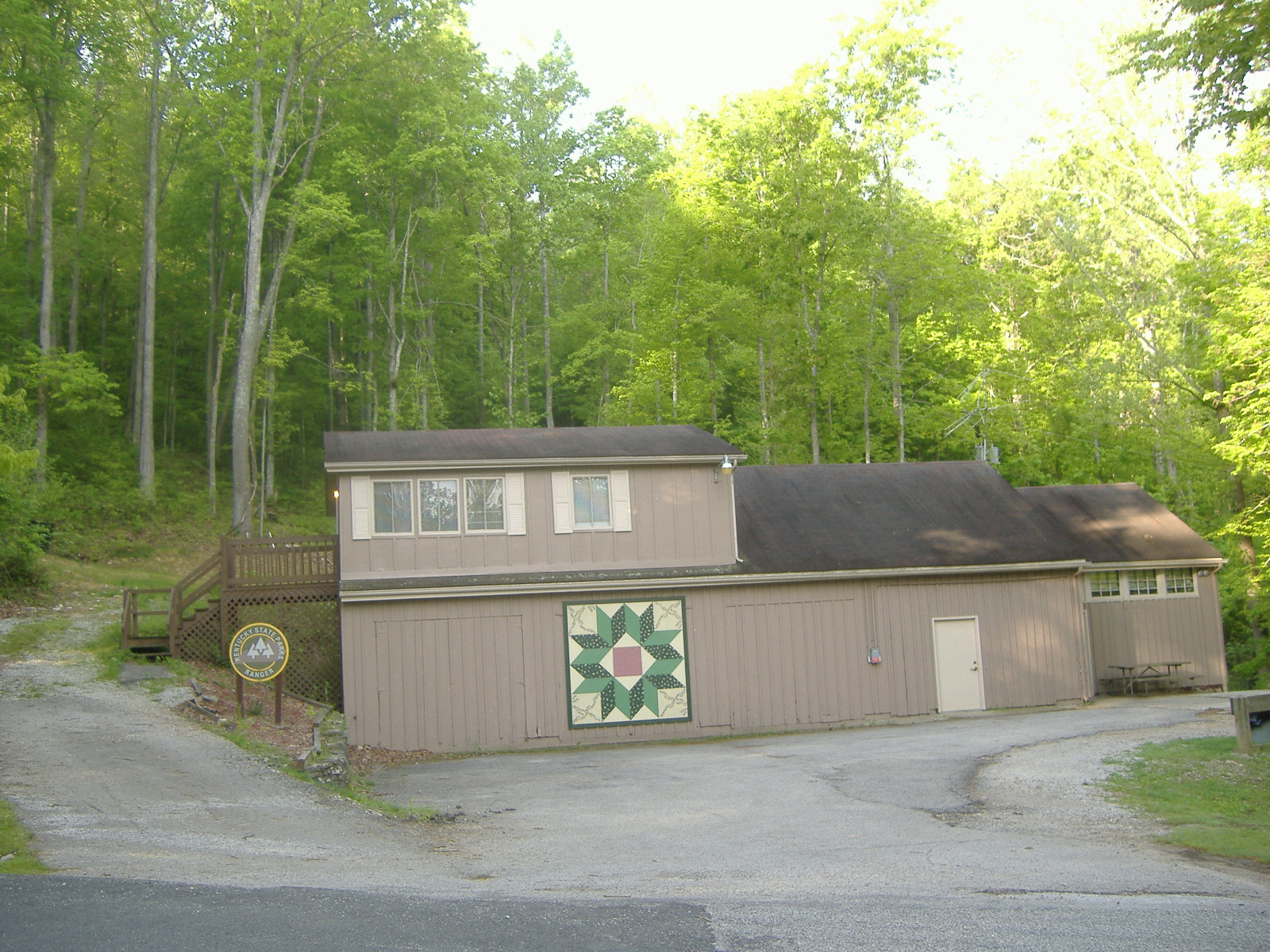
Former Ranger station, now storage and laundry, midway between Visitor Center and Lodge

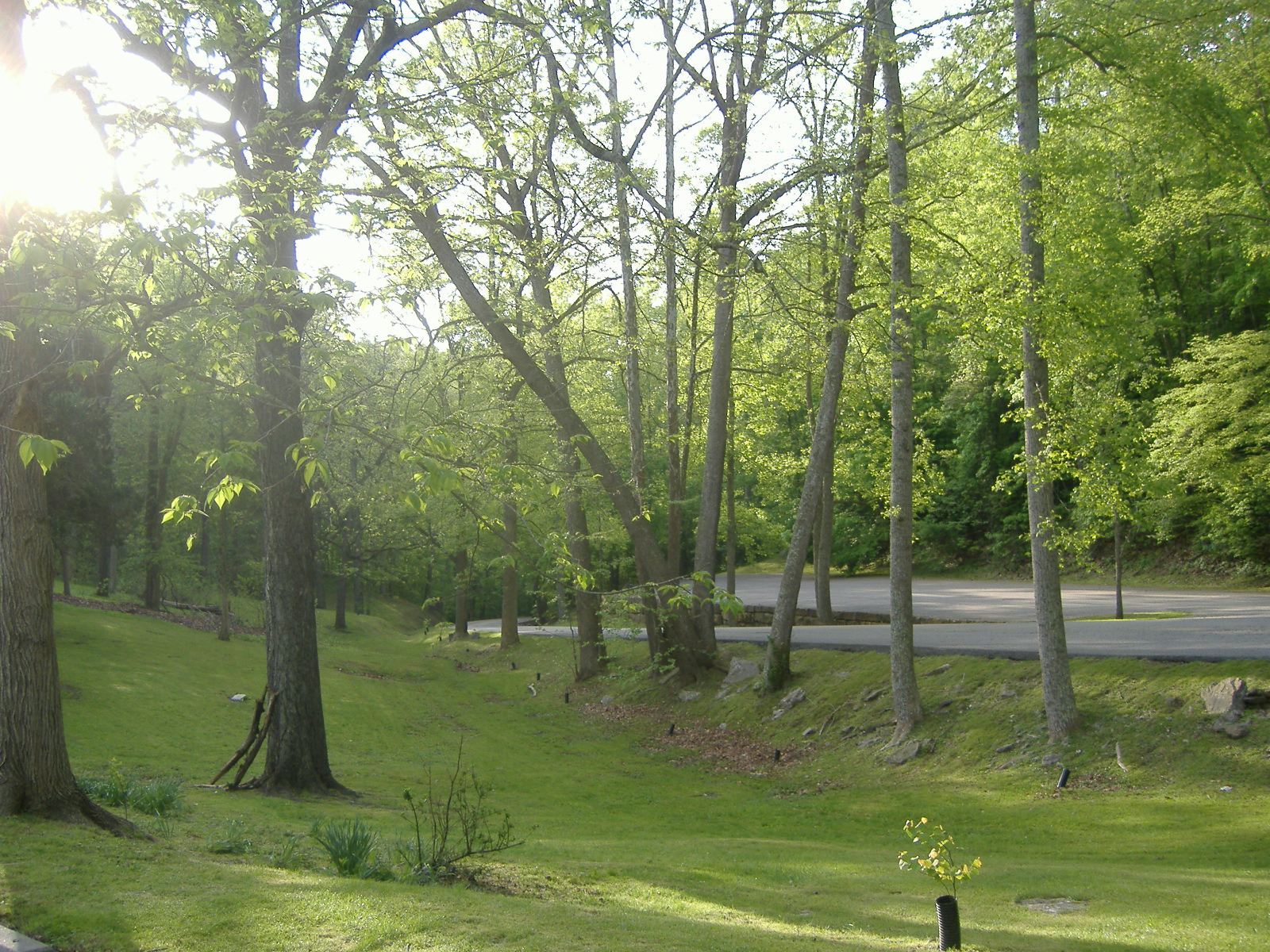
Roadway topography typical of the park

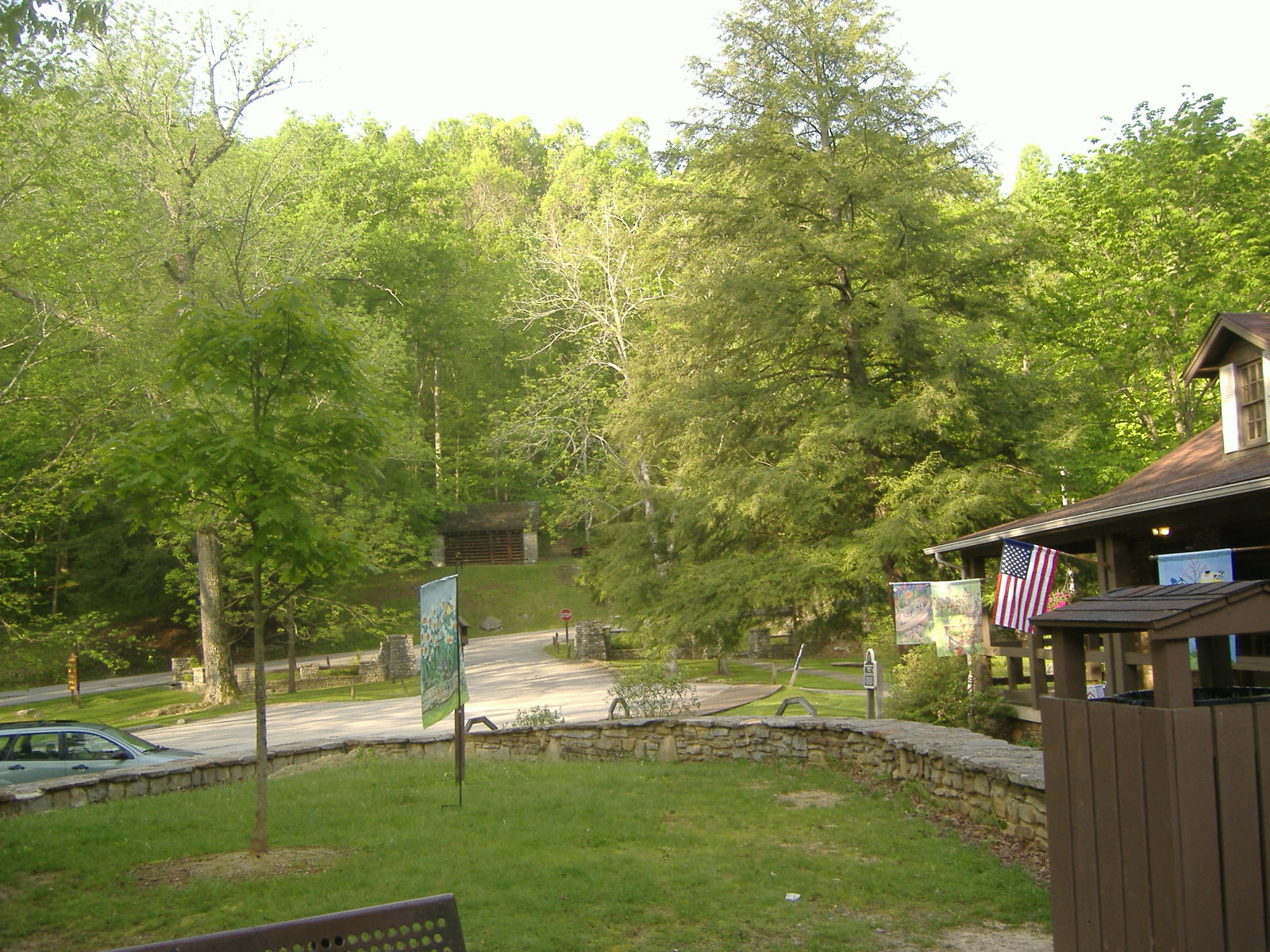
View of Saltpeter Cave from Visitor Center

== See also ==
- List of caves in the United States
