= Omophron aequale =

Scientific classification
- Kingdom: Animalia
- Phylum: Arthropoda
- Class: Insecta
- Order: Coleoptera
- Suborder: Adephaga
- Family: Carabidae
- Genus: Omophron
- Species: O. aequale

Binomial name
- Omophron aequale Morawitz, 1863

Subspecies
- O. a. aequale Morawitz, 1863; O. a. jacobsoni Semenov, 1922

Synonyms
- Omophron mongolicum Semenov, 1922

Species of beetle

Omophron aequale is a species of ground beetle in the family Carabidae. It is distributed in East Asia.

The species is very similar to Omophron limbatum. Although the puncturation (the arrangement of punctures) on the pronotum of O. aequale is a little finer than that of O. limbatum, it is denser. The species also has denser and coarser puncturation on the side margins of the first two sternites.

Omophron aequale is divided into 2 subspecies: O. aequale aequale and O. aequale jacobsoni.

O. aequale aequale has a length between 6.4 and 7.2 mm and a width between 4.2 and 4.4 mm. It is distributed in Japan and Sakhalin Island, Russia.

O. aequale jacobsoni has a length between 6.5 and 6.9 mm and a width between 4.1 and 4.5 mm. It is distributed in China (Guandong, Guanxi, Hainan, Jiangsu, Nei Mongol, Sichuan, Shanki, Yunnan, and Zhejiang), Mongolia, North Korea, South Korea, and eastern Russia.
