= Ceuthophilus alpinus =

Scientific classification
- Domain: Eukaryota
- Kingdom: Animalia
- Phylum: Arthropoda
- Class: Insecta
- Order: Orthoptera
- Suborder: Ensifera
- Family: Rhaphidophoridae
- Genus: Ceuthophilus
- Species: C. alpinus

Binomial name
- Ceuthophilus alpinus Scudder, 1894

Species of cricket-like animal

Ceuthophilus alpinus is a species of camel crickets in the family Rhaphidophoridae. It is found in North America.
