= Ceuthophilus brevipes =

Scientific classification
- Domain: Eukaryota
- Kingdom: Animalia
- Phylum: Arthropoda
- Class: Insecta
- Order: Orthoptera
- Suborder: Ensifera
- Family: Rhaphidophoridae
- Subfamily: Ceuthophilinae
- Genus: Ceuthophilus
- Species: C. brevipes

Binomial name
- Ceuthophilus brevipes Scudder, 1862

Species of cricket-like animal

Ceuthophilus brevipes, known generally as the boreal camel cricket or short-legged camel cricket, is a species of camel cricket in the family Rhaphidophoridae. It is found in North America.
