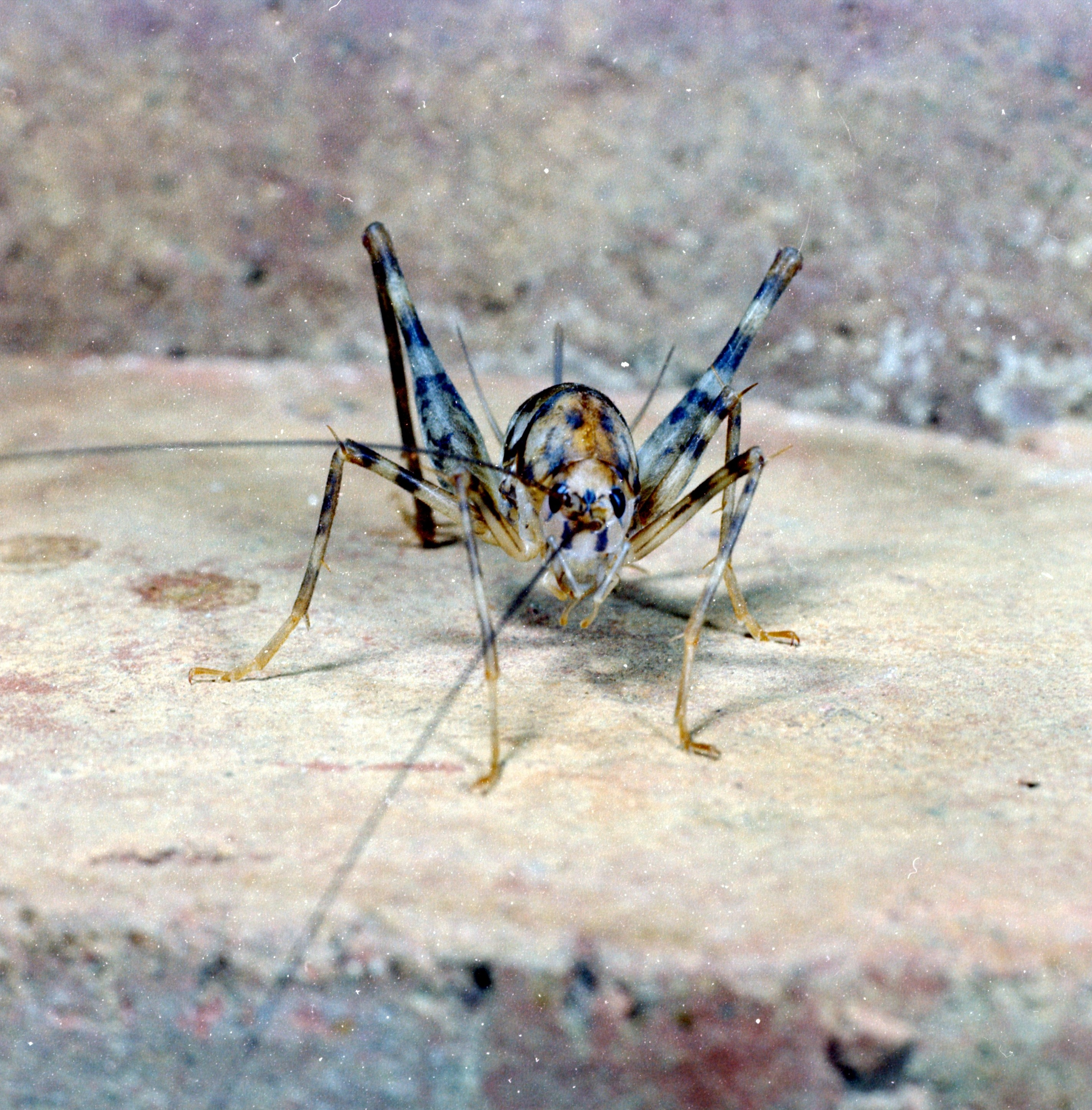
- Ceuthophilus sp.
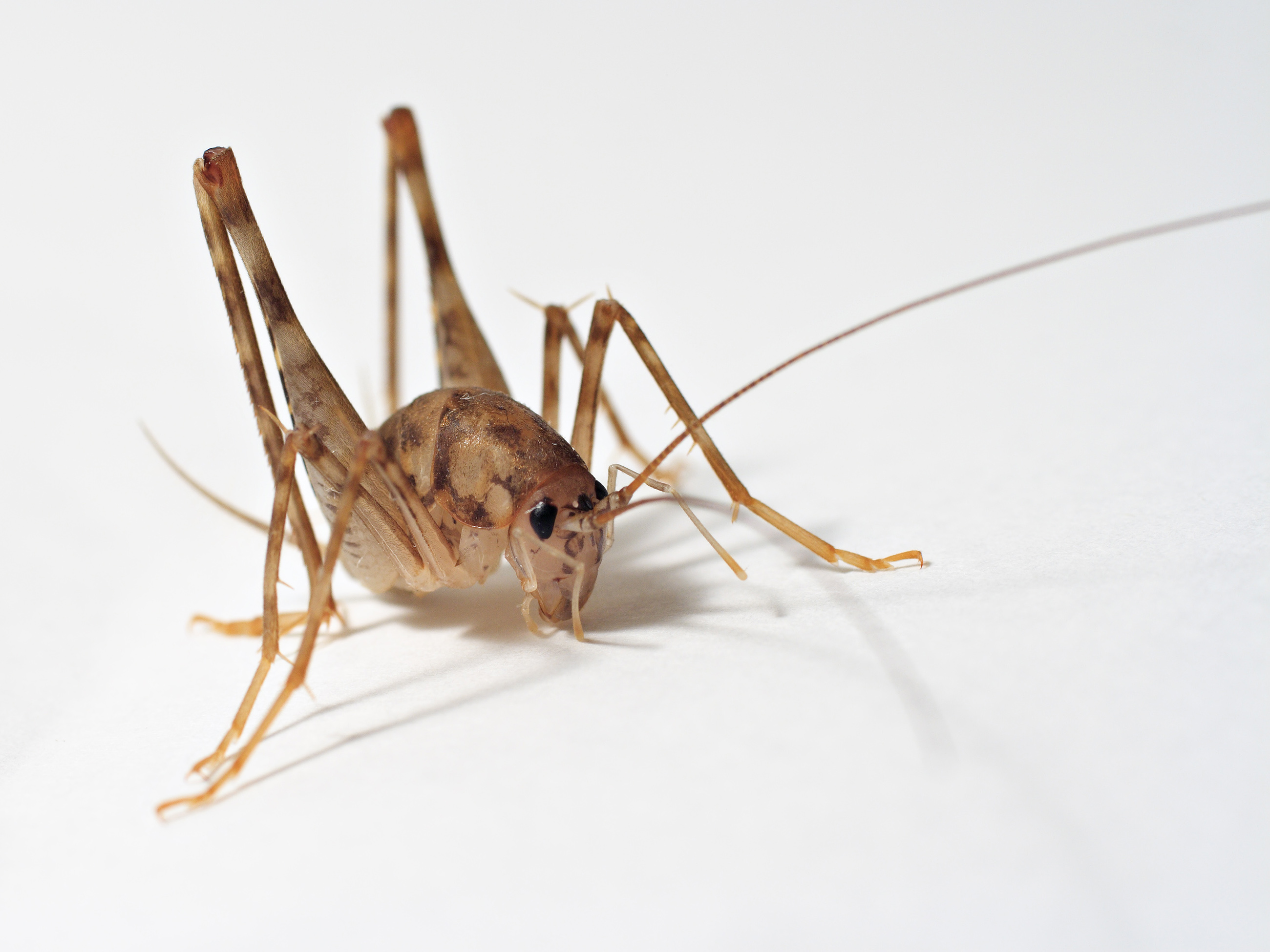

Scientific classification
- Kingdom: Animalia
- Phylum: Arthropoda
- Clade: Pancrustacea
- Class: Insecta
- Order: Orthoptera
- Suborder: Ensifera
- Family: Rhaphidophoridae
- Subfamily: Ceuthophilinae
- Genus: Ceuthophilus; Scudder, 1862

= Ceuthophilus =

Genus of cricket-like animals

Ceuthophilus is a genus of insects in the cave cricket family Rhaphidophoridae. It contains most of the species that are known commonly as camel crickets.

These insects have thick, dorsally arched bodies. The head is oval in shape with long, tapering antennae. The hind femur is thick and usually spiny in males, and sometimes slightly spiny in females.

Ceuthophilus have varied diets and have been described as omnivores and scavengers. Items observed in the diets of Ceuthophilus species include jelly, tuna, rancid liver, American cheese, pet food, oatmeal, wheat germ, peanut butter, molasses, wild fungi, persimmon, bread, dead and living insects, insect eggs, arachnids, dead bats, dead ring-tailed cats, and human feces.

Species include:

- Ceuthophilus abditus Hubbell, 1936
- Ceuthophilus agassizii (Scudder, 1861)
- Ceuthophilus alpinus Scudder, 1894
- Ceuthophilus apache Hubbell, 1936
- Ceuthophilus aridus Bruner, 1904
- Ceuthophilus arizonensis Scudder, 1894
- Ceuthophilus armatipes Hubbell, 1936
- Ceuthophilus baboquivariae Hubbell, 1936
- Ceuthophilus brevipes Scudder, 1862
- Ceuthophilus cacogeus Strohecker, 1951
- Ceuthophilus californianus Scudder, 1862
- Ceuthophilus carlsbadensis Caudell, 1924
- Ceuthophilus carolinus Hubbell, 1936
- Ceuthophilus caudelli Hubbell, 1936
- Ceuthophilus chiricahuae Hubbell, 1936
- Ceuthophilus conicaudus Hubbell, 1936
- Ceuthophilus crassifemoris Hubbell, 1929
- Ceuthophilus cunicularis Hubbell, 1936
- Ceuthophilus deserticola Barnum, 1964
- Ceuthophilus divergens Scudder, 1862
- Ceuthophilus elegans Hubbell, 1934
- Ceuthophilus ensifer Packer, 1881
- Ceuthophilus fissicaudus Hubbell, 1936
- Ceuthophilus fossor Hubbell, 1936
- Ceuthophilus fusiformis Scudder, 1894
- Ceuthophilus genicularis (Saussure & Pictet, 1897)
- Ceuthophilus gertschi Hubbell, 1936
- Ceuthophilus gracilipes (Haldeman, 1850)
- Ceuthophilus guttulosus Walker, 1869
- Ceuthophilus hebardi Hubbell, 1936
- Ceuthophilus hesperus Hubbell, 1936
- Ceuthophilus hualapai Hubbell, 1936
- Ceuthophilus hubbelli Hebard, 1939
- Ceuthophilus inyo Hubbell, 1936
- Ceuthophilus isletae Hubbell, 1936
- Ceuthophilus kansensis Hubbell, 1936
- Ceuthophilus lamellipes Rehn, 1907
- Ceuthophilus lapidicola (Burmeister, 1838)
- Ceuthophilus latens Scudder, 1862
- Ceuthophilus latibuli Scudder, 1894
- Ceuthophilus latipes Scudder, 1894
- Ceuthophilus leptopus Strohecker, 1947
- Ceuthophilus longipes Caudell, 1924
- Ceuthophilus maculatus (Harris, 1835)
- Ceuthophilus meridionalis Scudder, 1894
- Ceuthophilus mescalero Hubbell, 1936
- Ceuthophilus mississippi Hubbell, 1936
- Ceuthophilus mormonius Hubbell, 1936
- Ceuthophilus nevadensis Barnum, 1964
- Ceuthophilus nitens Hubbell, 1936
- Ceuthophilus nodulosus Brunner von Wattenwyl, 1888
- Ceuthophilus occultus Scudder, 1894
- Ceuthophilus osagensis Hubbell, 1936
- Ceuthophilus ozarkensis Hubbell, 1936
- Ceuthophilus pallescens Bruner, 1891
- Ceuthophilus pallidipes Walker, 1905
- Ceuthophilus papago Hubbell, 1936
- Ceuthophilus paucispinosus Rehn, 1905
- Ceuthophilus peninsularis Rehn & Hebard, 1914
- Ceuthophilus perplexus Hubbell, 1936
- Ceuthophilus pima Hubbell, 1936
- Ceuthophilus pinalensis Hubbell, 1936
- Ceuthophilus polingi Hubbell, 1936
- Ceuthophilus rehni Hubbell, 1936
- Ceuthophilus rogersi Hubbell, 1936
- Ceuthophilus seclusus Scudder, 1894
- Ceuthophilus secretus Scudder, 1894
- Ceuthophilus silvestris Bruner, 1886
- Ceuthophilus silvestris Bruner, 1886
- Ceuthophilus spinosus Scudder, 1894
- Ceuthophilus stygius (Scudder, 1861)
- Ceuthophilus tenebrarum Scudder, 1894
- Ceuthophilus tinkhami Hubbell, 1936
- Ceuthophilus uhleri Scudder, 1862
- Ceuthophilus umbratilis Hubbell, 1936
- Ceuthophilus umbrosus Hubbell, 1936
- Ceuthophilus unguiculatus Hubbell, 1936
- Ceuthophilus utahensis Thomas, 1876
- Ceuthophilus variegatus Scudder, 1894
- Ceuthophilus vicinus Hubbell, 1936
- Ceuthophilus virgatipes Rehn & Hebard, 1905
- Ceuthophilus walkeri Hubbell, 1929
- Ceuthophilus wasatchensis Hubbell, 1936
- Ceuthophilus wheeleri Hubbell, 1936
- Ceuthophilus wichitaensis Hubbell, 1936
- Ceuthophilus williamsoni Hubbell, 1934
- Ceuthophilus yavapai Hubbell, 1936
