= Omophron robustum =

Scientific classification
- Kingdom: Animalia
- Phylum: Arthropoda
- Class: Insecta
- Order: Coleoptera
- Suborder: Adephaga
- Family: Carabidae
- Genus: Omophron
- Species: O. robustum

Binomial name
- Omophron robustum G. Horn, 1870

Synonyms
- Omophron decoloratum Fall, 1920; Omophron brevipenne Casey, 1909

Species of beetle

Omophron robustum, the robust round sand beetle, is a species of ground beetle in the family Carabidae. It is found in North America (Alberta, Ontario, Iowa, Illinois, Indiana, Kansas, Michigan, Minnesota, Nebraska, Ohio, Oklahoma, South Dakota, Wisconsin), where it inhabits the beaches of lakes, rivers and brooks.

Adults are gregarious and nocturnal. During the day, they hide in burrows in the ground or under debris.
