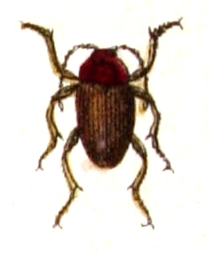

Scientific classification
- Kingdom: Animalia
- Phylum: Arthropoda
- Class: Insecta
- Order: Coleoptera
- Suborder: Polyphaga
- Infraorder: Staphyliniformia
- Family: Leiodidae
- Subfamily: Cholevinae
- Tribe: Cholevini
- Subtribe: Cholevina
- Genus: Choleva; Latreille, 1796

Synonyms
- Cholera Latreille, 1802; Cholevopsis Jeannel, 1922; Isomerus Gistel, 1834; Protocatops Perreau, 1995

= Choleva =

Genus of beetles

Choleva is a genus of beetles belonging to the family Leiodidae.

The genus was first described by Latreille in 1796.

Species:

- Choleva agilis
- Choleva angustata
- Choleva cisteloides
- Choleva elongata
- Choleva fagniezi
- Choleva glauca
- Choleva lederiana
- Choleva oblonga
- Choleva spinipennis
- Choleva sturmii
