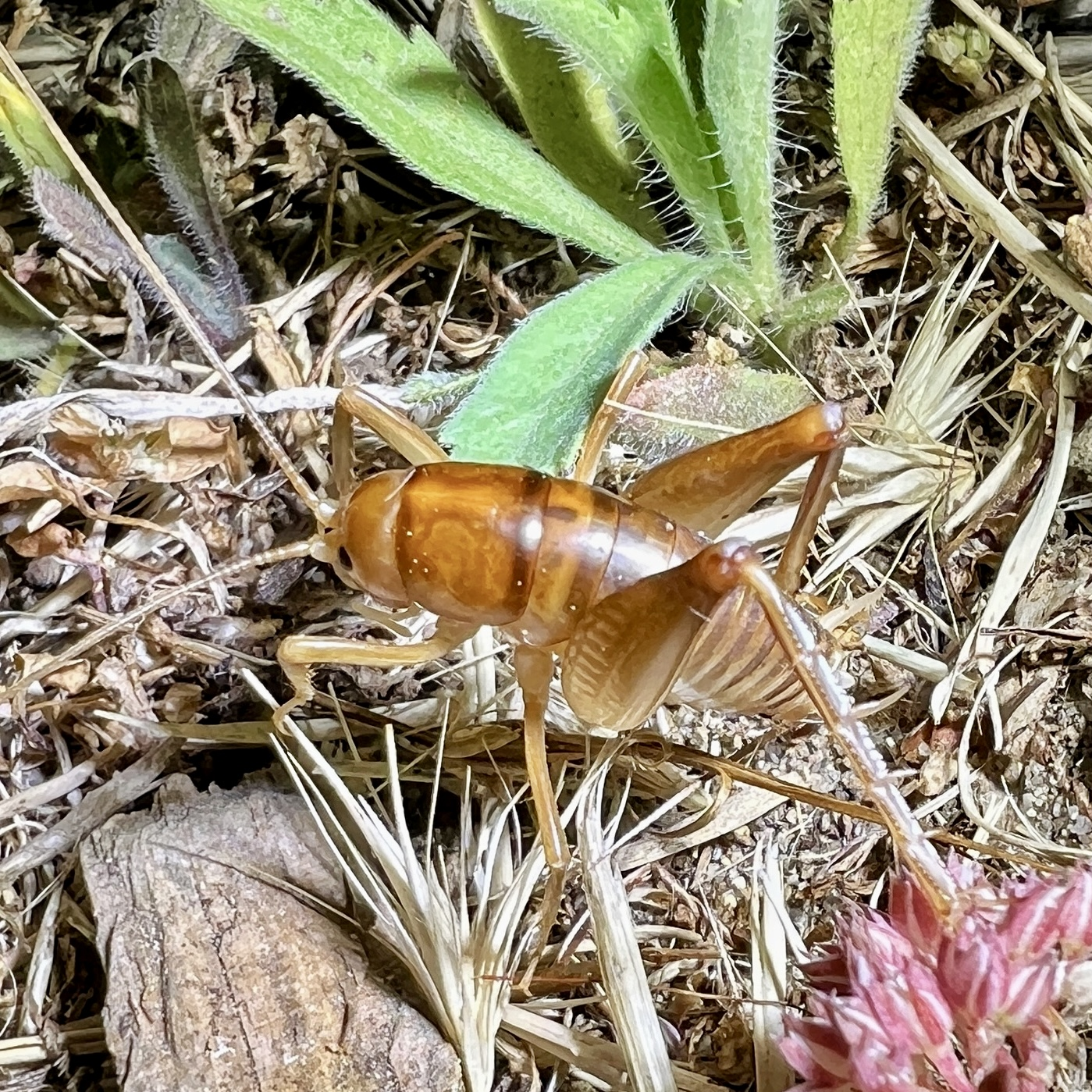

Scientific classification
- Domain: Eukaryota
- Kingdom: Animalia
- Phylum: Arthropoda
- Class: Insecta
- Order: Orthoptera
- Suborder: Ensifera
- Family: Rhaphidophoridae
- Subfamily: Ceuthophilinae
- Genus: Ceuthophilus
- Species: C. hesperus

Binomial name
- Ceuthophilus hesperus Hubbell, 1936

= Ceuthophilus hesperus =

Species of cricket-like animal

Ceuthophilus hesperus, the San Diego camel cricket, is a species of camel cricket in the family Rhaphidophoridae. It is found in North America.

== Subspecies ==
These 10 subspecies belong to the species Ceuthophilus hesperus:

- Ceuthophilus gracilipes apalachicolae Hubbell, 1936
- Ceuthophilus gracilipes gracilipes (Haldeman, 1850)
- Ceuthophilus guttulosus angulosus Eades, 1962
- Ceuthophilus guttulosus guttulosus F. Walker, 1869
- Ceuthophilus guttulosus nigricans Scudder, 1894 (yellow-bellied camel cricket)
- Ceuthophilus guttulosus thomasi Hubbell, 1936
- Ceuthophilus hesperus clunicornis Hubbell, 1936
- Ceuthophilus hesperus eino Rentz & Weissman, 1981
- Ceuthophilus hesperus hesperus Hubbell, 1936
- Ceuthophilus hesperus transitans Hubbell, 1936
