= Ceuthophilus maculatus =

Scientific classification
- Kingdom: Animalia
- Phylum: Arthropoda
- Class: Insecta
- Order: Orthoptera
- Suborder: Ensifera
- Family: Rhaphidophoridae
- Subfamily: Ceuthophilinae
- Genus: Ceuthophilus
- Species: C. maculatus

Binomial name
- Ceuthophilus maculatus (Harris, 1835)

Species of cricket-like animal

Ceuthophilus maculatus, the spotted camel cricket, is a species of camel cricket in the family Rhaphidophoridae. It is found in North America. Ceuthophilus maculatus is a humped, wingless cricket, 10-19 mm long, with antennae as long as or longer than its body. Unlike other crickets, males do not make noise. Coloration is glossy, dark brown, and spotted with yellowish-brown to reddish-brown on the thorax and hind legs. It is nocturnal, living in dark places under rocks, soil, logs, or bark. This species is omnivorous, eating fungi, roots, foliage, fruits, and other insects.
