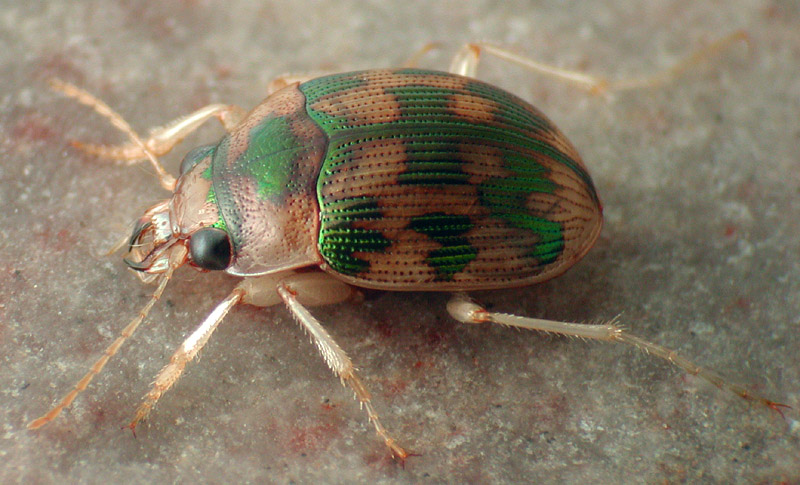

Scientific classification
- Kingdom: Animalia
- Phylum: Arthropoda
- Class: Insecta
- Order: Coleoptera
- Suborder: Adephaga
- Family: Carabidae
- Genus: Omophron
- Species: O. tessellatum

Binomial name
- Omophron tessellatum Say, 1823

Synonyms
- Omophron tessellatus Say, 1823; Omophron ellipticum Casey, 1909; Omophron lecontei Dejean, 1831

= Omophron tessellatum =

Species of beetle

Omophron tessellatum, the mosaic round sand beetle, is a species of ground beetle in the family Carabidae found in North America. Its distribution includes the United States in states in and between Arkansas, Virginia, Oklahoma, and Arizona; and in Canada in provinces from Nova Scotia to Alberta. The species grows to lengths of 5.4 to 7 millimeters. Its habitat is flooded areas such as lake shores, river banks, ponds, pool edges, and beaches with sandy or clayish soil. It breeds in the spring from May to July.
