= Omophron ovale =

Scientific classification
- Domain: Eukaryota
- Kingdom: Animalia
- Phylum: Arthropoda
- Class: Insecta
- Order: Coleoptera
- Suborder: Adephaga
- Family: Carabidae
- Genus: Omophron
- Species: O. ovale

Binomial name
- Omophron ovale G. Horn, 1870

Synonyms
- Omophron frater Casey, 1913; Omophron concinnum Casey, 1897; Omophron gemma Casey, 1897

Species of beetle

Omophron ovale, the oval round sand beetle, is a species of ground beetle in the family Carabidae. It is found in North America. Inhabiting mostly the margins of freshwater ponds, streams, and lakes (as well as some sea beaches and salt marshes), O. ovale are riparian and burrow into sand and mud. O. ovale, as all Carabidae, go through complete metamorphosis. This consists of three distinct stages before becoming an adult— egg, then larva, then pupa. O. ovale are around 4.5mm to 6.6mm in length and have a distinctive pattern on their body, with yellowish tan and metallic green markings.
