= Omophron labiatum =

Scientific classification
- Domain: Eukaryota
- Kingdom: Animalia
- Phylum: Arthropoda
- Class: Insecta
- Order: Coleoptera
- Suborder: Adephaga
- Family: Carabidae
- Genus: Omophron
- Species: O. labiatum

Binomial name
- Omophron labiatum (Fabricius, 1801)

Synonyms
- Carabus labiatus Fabricius, 1801; Scolytus labiatus

Species of beetle

Omophron labiatum, the large-lipped round sand beetle, is a species of ground beetle in the family Carabidae. It is found in North America, where it inhabits margins of ponds, lakes and rivers in the coastal lowlands.

Adults are gregarious and mostly nocturnal and usually hide in burrows in the ground during the day.

The larvae are sometimes considered a pest, because they may feed on grains and corn.
