= Prionochaeta opaca =

Scientific classification
- Domain: Eukaryota
- Kingdom: Animalia
- Phylum: Arthropoda
- Class: Insecta
- Order: Coleoptera
- Suborder: Polyphaga
- Infraorder: Staphyliniformia
- Family: Leiodidae
- Genus: Prionochaeta
- Species: P. opaca

Binomial name
- Prionochaeta opaca (Say, 1825)

Species of beetle

Prionochaeta opaca is a species of small carrion beetle in the family Leiodidae. It is found in North America.
