= Omophron sphaericum =

Scientific classification
- Kingdom: Animalia
- Phylum: Arthropoda
- Class: Insecta
- Order: Coleoptera
- Suborder: Adephaga
- Family: Carabidae
- Genus: Omophron
- Species: O. sphaericum

Binomial name
- Omophron sphaericum Chevrolat, 1835

Species of beetle

Omophron sphaericum, the round round sand beetle, is a species of beetle of the Carabidae family. This species is found in Mexico (Veracruz) and Guatemala.
