= Ceuthophilus secretus =

Scientific classification
- Kingdom: Animalia
- Phylum: Arthropoda
- Class: Insecta
- Order: Orthoptera
- Suborder: Ensifera
- Family: Rhaphidophoridae
- Subfamily: Ceuthophilinae
- Genus: Ceuthophilus
- Species: C. secretus

Binomial name
- Ceuthophilus secretus Scudder, 1894

Species of cricket-like animal

Ceuthophilus secretus, known generally as the Texas cave cricket or secret cave cricket, is a species of camel cricket in the family Rhaphidophoridae. It is found in North America. Like many other camel crickets, this species is nocturnal, wingless, has antennae longer than its body, and appears humpbacked. It dwells primarily in caves and is omnivorous, eating fungi, many types of plant matter, and dead insects. In coloration, the species ranges from yellowish gray to dark brown.
