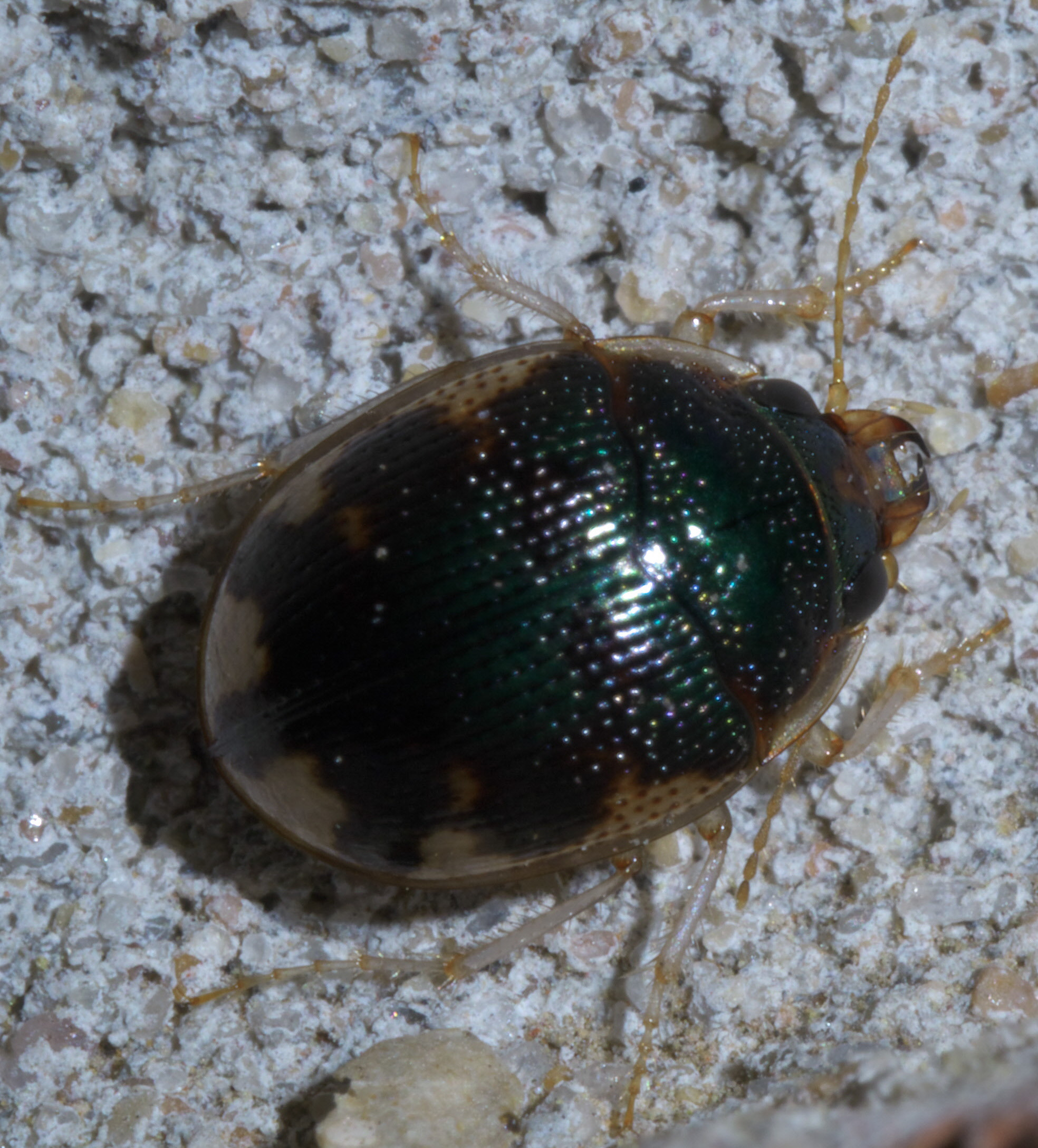

Scientific classification
- Kingdom: Animalia
- Phylum: Arthropoda
- Class: Insecta
- Order: Coleoptera
- Suborder: Adephaga
- Family: Carabidae
- Genus: Omophron
- Species: O. nitidum

Binomial name
- Omophron nitidum LeConte, 1847

Synonyms
- Omophron nitidus LeConte, 1847; Omophron nitens Chaudoir, 1868

= Omophron nitidum =

Species of beetle

Omophron nitidum, the shiny round sand beetle, is a species of ground beetle in the family Carabidae. It is found in North America within the United States, in areas such as Indiana, Minnesota, Nebraska, Alabama and Texas. Adults are nocturnal, spending their time in burrows and leaf litter during the day. The breeding of O. nitidum takes place from (month) to December.

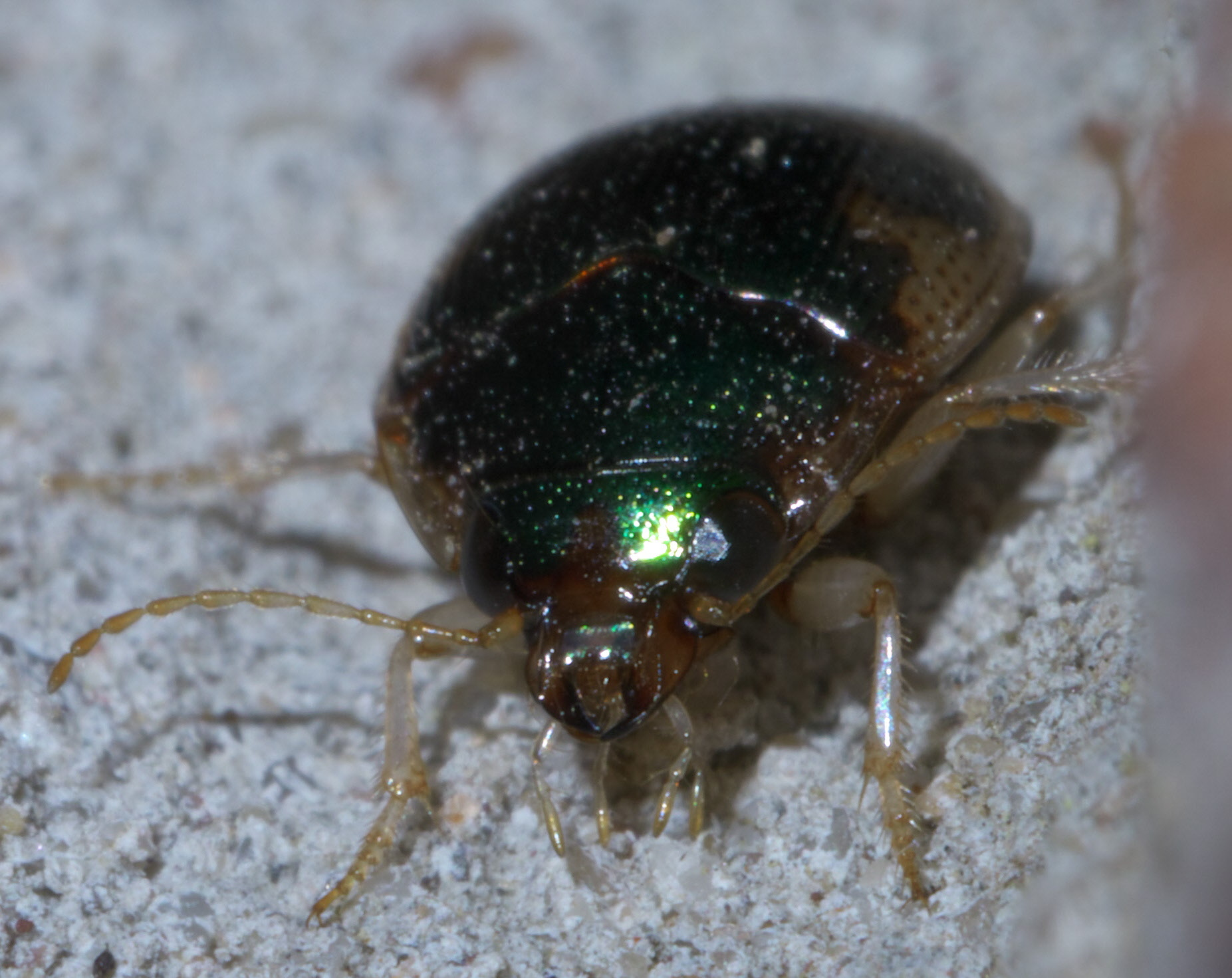
Shiny Round Sand Beetle, Omophron nitidum, Pryor, OK, USA
