= Omophron obliteratum =

Scientific classification
- Kingdom: Animalia
- Phylum: Arthropoda
- Class: Insecta
- Order: Coleoptera
- Suborder: Adephaga
- Family: Carabidae
- Genus: Omophron
- Species: O. obliteratum

Binomial name
- Omophron obliteratum G. Horn, 1870

Synonyms
- Omophron subimpressum Casey, 1913; Omophron utense Casey, 1913; Omophron sonorae Casey, 1897

Species of beetle

Omophron obliteratum, the effaced round sand beetle, is a species of ground beetle in the family Carabidae. It is found in Central America and North America (Chihuahua, Durango, Sonora, Zacatecas, Arizona, California, Montana, New Mexico, Texas, Utah), where it inhabits the margins of creeks and rivers.

Adults are gregarious and nocturnal. During the day they hide in burrows in the ground.
