= Omophron grossum =

Scientific classification
- Kingdom: Animalia
- Phylum: Arthropoda
- Class: Insecta
- Order: Coleoptera
- Suborder: Adephaga
- Family: Carabidae
- Genus: Omophron
- Species: O. grossum

Binomial name
- Omophron grossum Casey, 1909

Species of beetle

Omophron grossum, the large round sand beetle, is a species of ground beetle in the family Carabidae. It is found in North America (Arizona, Iowa, Kansas, Montana, Mississippi, Oklahoma, Texas), where it inhabits river margins.

Adults are gregarious and nocturnal. During the day, they hide in burrows in the ground.
