= Omophron axillare =

Scientific classification
- Domain: Eukaryota
- Kingdom: Animalia
- Phylum: Arthropoda
- Class: Insecta
- Order: Coleoptera
- Suborder: Adephaga
- Family: Carabidae
- Genus: Omophron
- Species: O. axillare

Binomial name
- Omophron axillare Chaudoir, 1868

Species of beetle

Omophron axillare is a species of ground beetle in the family Carabidae.

This species is known to be found only in mountainous regions. It is distributed across Afghanistan, Bangladesh, Pakistan, and India (Himachal Pradesh, Punjab, Uttar Pradesh, and Uttarakhand).

Omophron axillare has a length of 6 to 7 mm and a width of 3.6 to 3.9 mm. It has a shiny, testaceous (dull brick-red) colouring.
