= Ceuthophilus elegans =

Scientific classification
- Domain: Eukaryota
- Kingdom: Animalia
- Phylum: Arthropoda
- Class: Insecta
- Order: Orthoptera
- Suborder: Ensifera
- Family: Rhaphidophoridae
- Genus: Ceuthophilus
- Species: C. elegans

Binomial name
- Ceuthophilus elegans Hubbell, 1934

Synonyms
- Ceuthophilus (Geotettix) elegans

Species of cricket-like animal

Ceuthophilus elegans is an insect species in the genus Ceuthophilus. It is placed in the cave crickets subfamily (Ceuthophilinae). It is found in the United States.
