= Omophron chelys =

Scientific classification
- Domain: Eukaryota
- Kingdom: Animalia
- Phylum: Arthropoda
- Class: Insecta
- Order: Coleoptera
- Suborder: Adephaga
- Family: Carabidae
- Genus: Omophron
- Species: O. chelys

Binomial name
- Omophron chelys Andrewes, 1921

Species of beetle

Omophron chelys is a species of ground beetle in the family Carabidae. It is distributed in northeastern India, in the state of Sikkim.

== Description ==
The species has a length of approximately 4.0 mm and a width of approximately 2.7 mm. Its colouring is generally testaceous (dull brick-red).
