= Omophron oblongiusculum =

Scientific classification
- Kingdom: Animalia
- Phylum: Arthropoda
- Clade: Pancrustacea
- Class: Insecta
- Order: Coleoptera
- Suborder: Adephaga
- Family: Carabidae
- Genus: Omophron
- Species: O. oblongiusculum

Binomial name
- Omophron oblongiusculum Chevrolat, 1835

Species of beetle

Omophron oblongiusculum, the long round sand beetle, is a species of beetle of the Carabidae family. This species is found in Mexico (Chiapas, Oaxaca), where it inhabits sandy stream margins.
