= Ceuthophilus agassizii =

Scientific classification
- Kingdom: Animalia
- Phylum: Arthropoda
- Clade: Pancrustacea
- Class: Insecta
- Order: Orthoptera
- Suborder: Ensifera
- Family: Rhaphidophoridae
- Subfamily: Ceuthophilinae
- Genus: Ceuthophilus
- Species: C. agassizii

Binomial name
- Ceuthophilus agassizii (Scudder, 1861)

Species of cricket-like animal

Ceuthophilus agassizii is a species of camel cricket in the family Rhaphidophoridae. It is found in North America.
