= Omophron mexicanum =

Scientific classification
- Kingdom: Animalia
- Phylum: Arthropoda
- Class: Insecta
- Order: Coleoptera
- Suborder: Adephaga
- Family: Carabidae
- Genus: Omophron
- Species: O. mexicanum

Binomial name
- Omophron mexicanum Dupuis, 1912

Species of beetle

Omophron mexicanum, the Mexican round sand beetle, is a species of beetle of the Carabidae family. This species is found in Mexico (Veracruz).
