= Saltpeter Cave =

- U.S. National Register of Historic Places
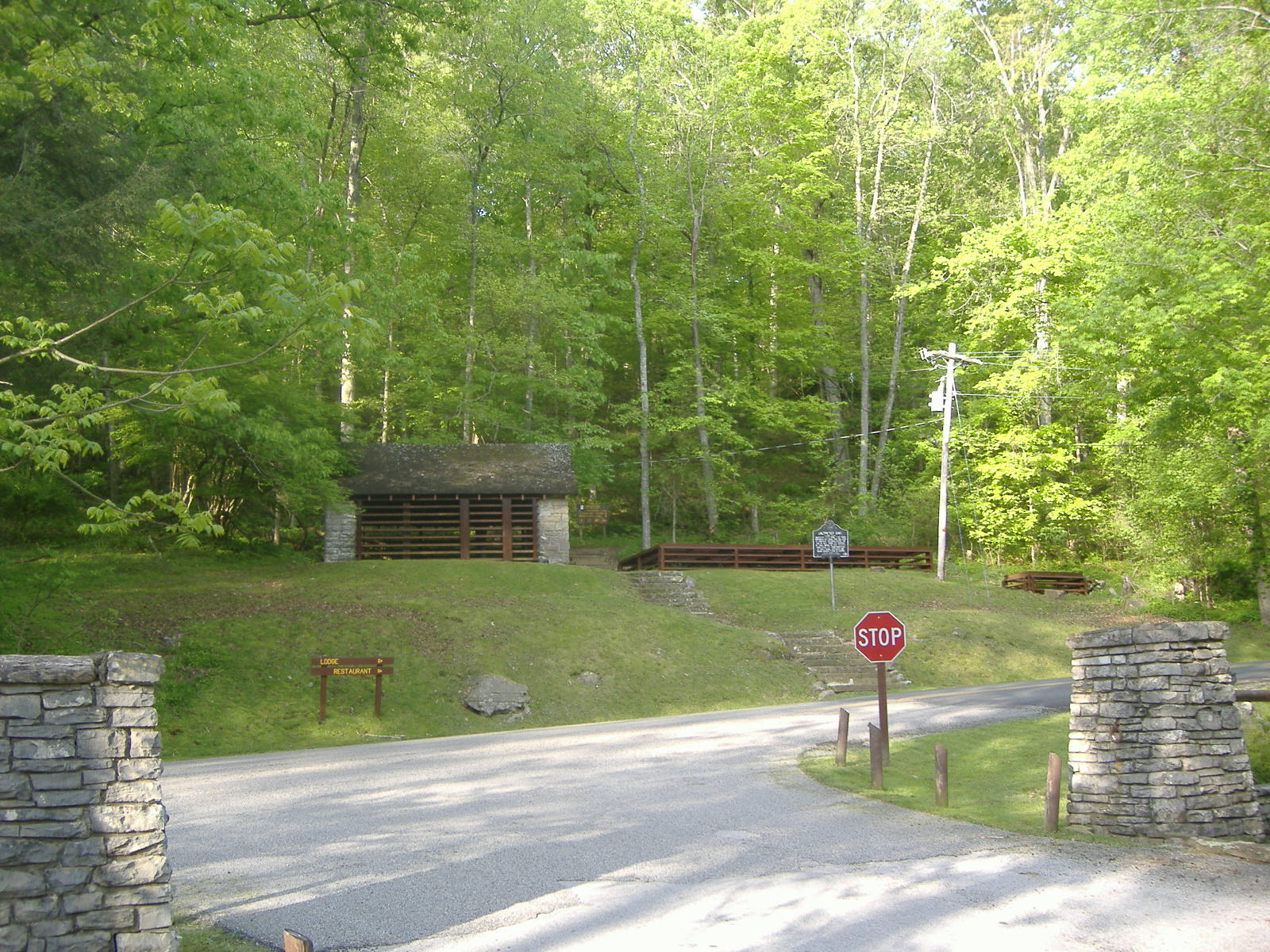
- Nearest city: Olive Hill, Kentucky
- Coordinates: 38°22′35″N 83°07′26″W
- Area: 2.4 acres (0.97 ha)
- NRHP reference No.: 01000743
- Added to NRHP: July 24, 2001

Saltpeter Cave, in Carter Caves State Resort Park near Olive Hill, Kentucky. It was listed on the National Register of Historic Places in 2001.

It has also been known as Swingle's Cave and as Swindell's Cave. It is a limestone cave with 3.05 kilometres (1.90 mi) of measured length.

It has served as a saltpeter, or niter, mine, by the early 1800s. It has been believed, by local tradition, that niter mined from the cave was used to make gunpowder for the War of 1812, including supplying for the 1815 Battle of New Orleans.

The cave entrance is gated by a "limestone block and iron bar structure, resembling a jail cell", which was built in the mid-1900s.

The cave was developed for use by bats.

The cave is unique in that it is a hibernaculum for the endangered Indiana Bat in the winter months.

It is open for cave tours during the summer, from Memorial Day to Labor Day.
