= Omophron gratum =

Scientific classification
- Kingdom: Animalia
- Phylum: Arthropoda
- Class: Insecta
- Order: Coleoptera
- Suborder: Adephaga
- Family: Carabidae
- Genus: Omophron
- Species: O. gratum

Binomial name
- Omophron gratum Chaudoir, 1868

Species of beetle

Omophron gratum, the pleasing round sand beetle, is a species of beetle of the Carabidae family. This species is found in Costa Rica, Guatemala and Mexico, where it may be found along river margins.
