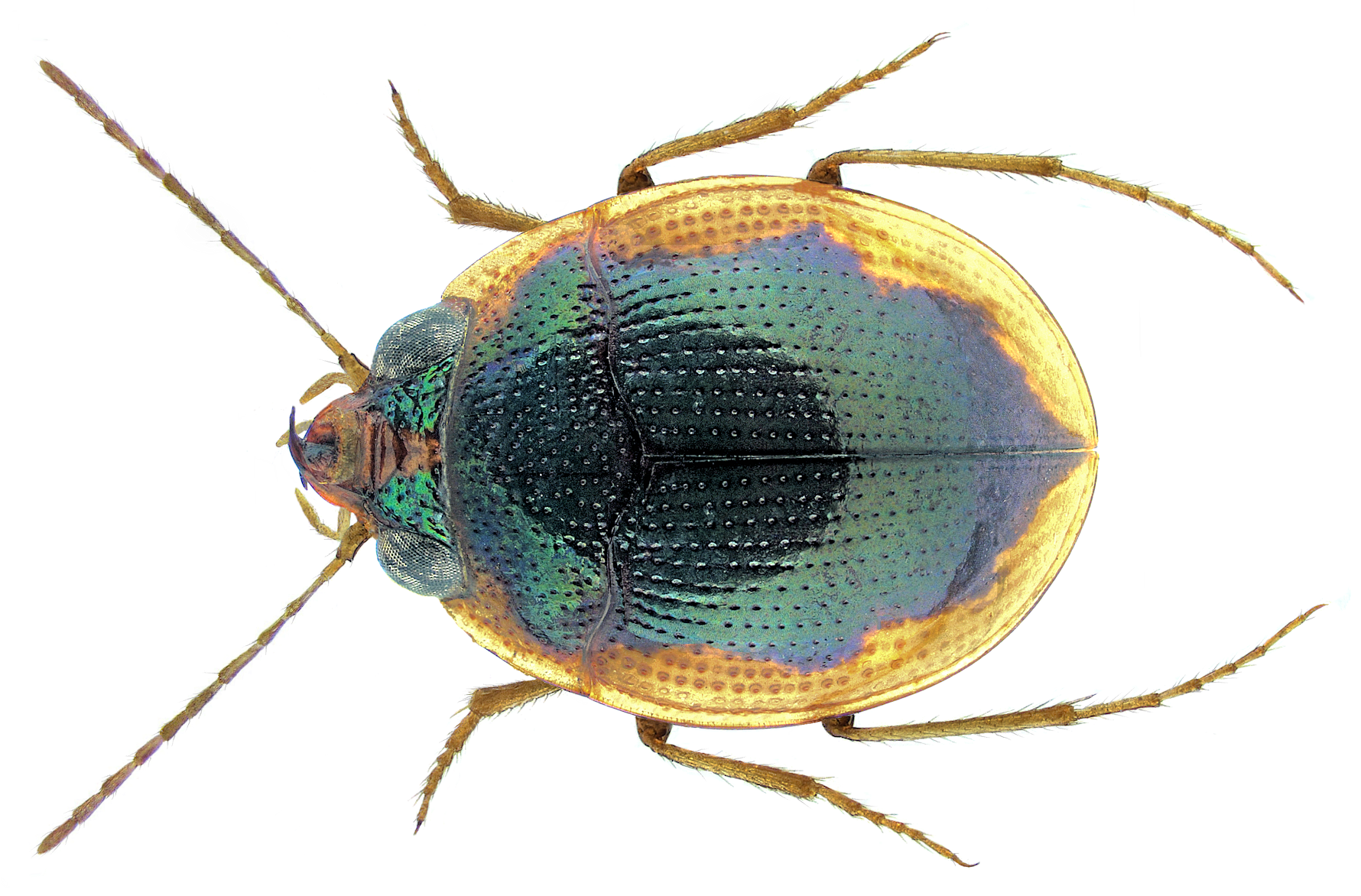
- Omophron brettinghamae

Scientific classification
- Domain: Eukaryota
- Kingdom: Animalia
- Phylum: Arthropoda
- Class: Insecta
- Order: Coleoptera
- Suborder: Adephaga
- Family: Carabidae
- Genus: Omophron
- Species: O. brettinghamae

Binomial name
- Omophron brettinghamae Pascoe, 1860

Synonyms
- Omophron levigatum Gestro, 1888

= Omophron brettinghamae =

Species of beetle

Omophron brettinghamae is a species of ground beetle in the family Carabidae. It is distributed in Bangladesh, Vietnam, Nepal and Myanmar.

It has a length of 3.5 to 4 mm and a width of 2.4 to 2.6 mm. Its colouring is a shiny, very dark metallic green with testaceous (dull red-brick) labrum, palpi, antennae, side margins of prothorax and elytra, apex of venter, and legs.
