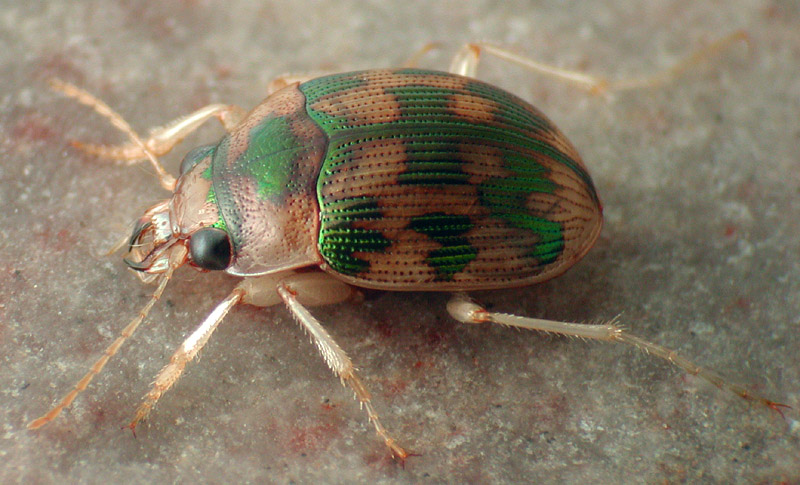
- Omophron tessellatum

Scientific classification
- Kingdom: Animalia
- Phylum: Arthropoda
- Class: Insecta
- Order: Coleoptera
- Suborder: Adephaga
- Family: Carabidae
- Tribe: Omophronini; Bonelli, 1810
- Genus: Omophron; Latreille, 1802

Synonyms
- Scolytus Fabricius, 1790 (Preocc.); Epactius Schneider, 1791 (Unav.); Lithophilus Schneider, 1791 (Unav.); Andromophron Semenov-Tian-Shanskii, 1922; Epacter Semenov-Tian-Shanskii, 1922; Istor Semenov-Tian-Shanskii, 1922; Oligomophron Semenov-Tian-Shanskii, 1922; Paromophron Semenov-Tian-Shanskii, 1922; Prosecon Semenov-Tian-Shanskii, 1922; Stenomophron Semenov-Tian-Shanskii, 1922; Phromoon Lucnik, 1933

= Omophron =

Genus of beetles

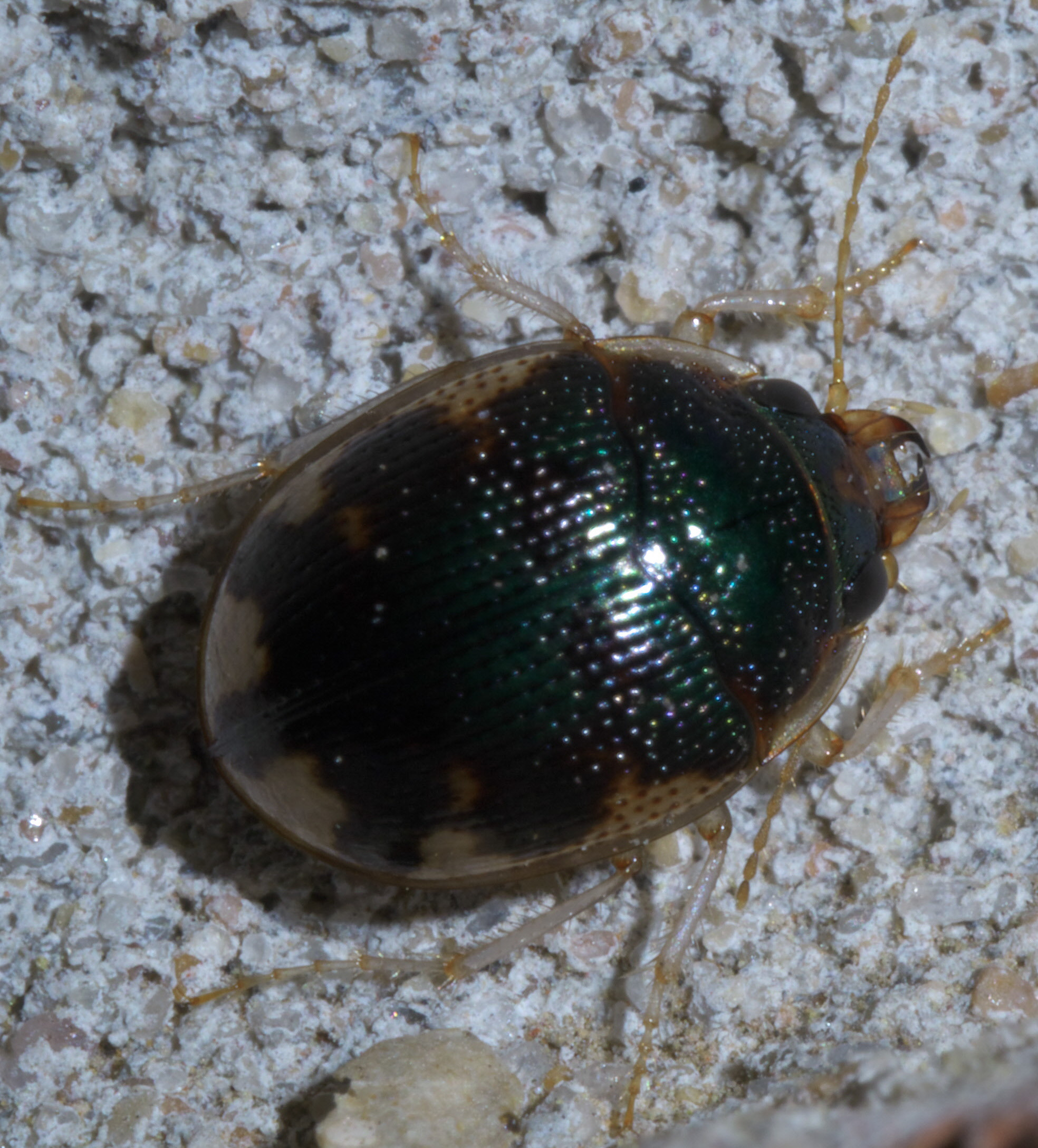
Omophron nitidum

Omophron is a genus of ground beetle (Carabidae), the only extant genus in the subfamily Omophroninae. It is mostly distributed in the Northern Hemisphere with the southern border running through Guatemala and Hispaniola in Americas, South Africa and Madagascar in Africa, Malaysia and Philippines in Asia.

== Species ==
Subgenus Omophron Latreille, 1802

- Omophron aequale A.Morawitz, 1863
- Omophron affine Bänninger, 1918
- Omophron africanum Rousseau, 1908
- Omophron amandae Valainis, 2010
- Omophron americanum Dejean, 1831
- Omophron axillare Chaudoir, 1868
- Omophron baenningeri Dupuis, 1912
- Omophron bicolor Andrewes, 1919
- Omophron brettinghamae Pascoe, 1860
- Omophron capense Gory, 1833
- Omophron capicola Chaudoir, 1868
- Omophron chelys Andrewes, 1921
- Omophron clavareaui Rousseau, 1900
- Omophron congoense Delève, 1924
- Omophron dentatum LeConte, 1852
- Omophron dissimile Delève, 1924
- Omophron distinctum Bänninger, 1918
- Omophron gemmeum Andrewes, 1921
- Omophron ghesquierei Delève, 1924
- Omophron gilae LeConte, 1852
- Omophron gratum Chaudoir, 1868
- Omophron grossum Casey, 1909
- Omophron guttatum Chaudoir, 1868
- Omophron hainanense Tian & Deuve, 2000
- Omophron interruptum Chaudoir, 1868
- Omophron labiatum (Fabricius, 1801)
- Omophron limbatum (Fabricius, 1777)
- Omophron lunatum Bänninger, 1918
- Omophron luzonicum Darlington, 1967
- Omophron maculosum Chaudoir, 1850
- Omophron madagascariense Chaudoir, 1850
- Omophron mexicanum Dupuis, 1912
- Omophron minutum Dejean, 1831
- Omophron nepalense Valainis, 2013
- Omophron nitidum LeConte, 1847
- Omophron oberthueri Gestro, 1892
- Omophron obliteratum G.Horn, 1870
- Omophron oblongiusculum Chevrolat, 1835
- Omophron ovale G.Horn, 1870
- Omophron parvum Tian & Deuve, 2000
- Omophron piceopictum Wrase, 2002
- Omophron pictum (Wiedemann, 1823)
- Omophron picturatum Boheman, 1860
- Omophron porosum Chaudoir, 1868
- Omophron pseudotestudo Tian & Deuve, 2000
- Omophron riedeli Emden, 1932
- Omophron robustum G.Horn, 1870
- Omophron rotundatum Chaudoir, 1852
- Omophron saigonense Chaudoir, 1868
- Omophron severini Dupuis, 1911
- Omophron smaragdus Andrewes, 1921
- Omophron solidum Casey, 1897
- Omophron sphaericum Chevrolat, 1835
- Omophron stictum Andrewes, 1933
- Omophron striaticeps Gestro, 1888
- Omophron tessellatum Say, 1823
- Omophron testudo Andrewes, 1919
- Omophron virens Andrewes, 1929
- Omophron vittatum (Wiedemann, 1823)
- Omophron yunnanense Tian & Deuve, 2000

Subgenus Phrator Semenov-Tian-Shanskii, 1922

- Omophron alluaudi Dupuis, 1913
- Omophron barsevskisi Valainis, 2011
- Omophron depressum Klug, 1853
- Omophron ethiopiense Valanis, 2016
- Omophron grandidieri (Alluaud, 1899)
- Omophron multiguttatum Chaudoir, 1850
- Omophron schoutedeni Delève, 1924
- Omophron variegatum Olivier, 1812
- Omophron vittulatum Fairmaire, 1894
