= Omophron gilae =

Scientific classification
- Domain: Eukaryota
- Kingdom: Animalia
- Phylum: Arthropoda
- Class: Insecta
- Order: Coleoptera
- Suborder: Adephaga
- Family: Carabidae
- Genus: Omophron
- Species: O. gilae

Binomial name
- Omophron gilae Leconte, 1852

Synonyms
- Omophron pimale Casey, 1913; Omophron pallidum Casey, 1897

Species of beetle

Omophron gilae, the Gila River round sand beetle, is a species of ground beetle in the family Carabidae. It is found in Central America and North America (Sonora, Arizona, California, Colorado, New Mexico, Texas, Utah), where it may be found at the margins of water bodies.

Adults are nocturnal and gregarious. During the day, they hide in burrows they dug in the ground.
