= Ceuthophilus gracilipes =

Scientific classification
- Domain: Eukaryota
- Kingdom: Animalia
- Phylum: Arthropoda
- Class: Insecta
- Order: Orthoptera
- Suborder: Ensifera
- Family: Rhaphidophoridae
- Subfamily: Ceuthophilinae
- Genus: Ceuthophilus
- Species: C. gracilipes

Binomial name
- Ceuthophilus gracilipes (Haldeman, 1850)

Species of cricket-like animal

Ceuthophilus gracilipes, the slender-legged camel cricket, is a species of camel cricket in the family Rhaphidophoridae. It is found in North America.

== Subspecies ==
These two subspecies belong to the species Ceuthophilus gracilipes:

- Ceuthophilus gracilipes apalachicolae Hubbell, 1936
- Ceuthophilus gracilipes gracilipes (Haldeman, 1850)
