= Ceuthophilus californianus =

Scientific classification
- Domain: Eukaryota
- Kingdom: Animalia
- Phylum: Arthropoda
- Class: Insecta
- Order: Orthoptera
- Suborder: Ensifera
- Family: Rhaphidophoridae
- Genus: Ceuthophilus
- Species: C. californianus

Binomial name
- Ceuthophilus californianus Scudder, S.H., 1862

Species of cricket-like animal

Ceuthophilus californianus is a species in the family Rhaphidophoridae ("camel crickets"), in the order Orthoptera ("grasshoppers, crickets, katydids"). The species is known generally as the "California camel cricket". It is found in North America.
