= Omophron solidum =

Scientific classification
- Kingdom: Animalia
- Phylum: Arthropoda
- Class: Insecta
- Order: Coleoptera
- Suborder: Adephaga
- Family: Carabidae
- Genus: Omophron
- Species: O. solidum

Binomial name
- Omophron solidum Casey, 1897

Synonyms
- Omophron lawrencei Hatch, 1953

Species of beetle

Omophron solidum, the solid round sand beetle, is a species of ground beetle in the family Carabidae. It is found in North America (California and Oregon), where it inhabits the beaches of water bodies.

Adults are gregarious and nocturnal. During the day, they hide in burrows in the ground.
