= Omophron baenningeri =

Scientific classification
- Kingdom: Animalia
- Phylum: Arthropoda
- Class: Insecta
- Order: Coleoptera
- Suborder: Adephaga
- Family: Carabidae
- Genus: Omophron
- Species: O. baenningeri

Binomial name
- Omophron baenningeri Dupuis, 1912

Species of beetle

Omophron baenningeri, or Banninger's round sand beetle, is a species of beetle of the Carabidae family. This species is found in Mexico (Veracruz), where it inhabits stream margins.
