= Omophron dentatum =

Scientific classification
- Domain: Eukaryota
- Kingdom: Animalia
- Phylum: Arthropoda
- Class: Insecta
- Order: Coleoptera
- Suborder: Adephaga
- Family: Carabidae
- Genus: Omophron
- Species: O. dentatum

Binomial name
- Omophron dentatum Leconte, 1852

Species of beetle

Omophron dentatum, the toothed round sand beetle, is a species of ground beetle in the family Carabidae. It is found in Central America and North America (Baja California and California), where it may be found at the margin of rivers, brooks and ponds.

Adults are nocturnal. During the day, both the larvae and adults hide in burrows they dug in the ground.
