= Ceuthophilus guttulosus =

Scientific classification
- Domain: Eukaryota
- Kingdom: Animalia
- Phylum: Arthropoda
- Class: Insecta
- Order: Orthoptera
- Suborder: Ensifera
- Family: Rhaphidophoridae
- Genus: Ceuthophilus
- Species: C. guttulosus

Binomial name
- Ceuthophilus guttulosus Walker, 1869

Species of cricket-like animal

Ceuthophilus guttulosus, or Thomas' camel cricket, is a species of camel cricket in the family Rhaphidophoridae. It was described by Francis Walker in 1869 and is found in North America.

== Subspecies ==
- Ceuthophilus guttulosus angulosus Eades, 1962
- Ceuthophilus guttulosus guttulosus Walker, 1869
- Ceuthophilus guttulosus nigricans Scudder, 1894 (yellow-bellied camel cricket)
- Ceuthophilus guttulosus thomasi Hubbell, 1936
