= Ceuthophilus seclusus =

Scientific classification
- Domain: Eukaryota
- Kingdom: Animalia
- Phylum: Arthropoda
- Class: Insecta
- Order: Orthoptera
- Suborder: Ensifera
- Family: Rhaphidophoridae
- Subfamily: Ceuthophilinae
- Genus: Ceuthophilus
- Species: C. seclusus

Binomial name
- Ceuthophilus seclusus Scudder, 1894

Species of cricket-like animal

Ceuthophilus seclusus, the secluded camel cricket, is a species of camel cricket in the family Rhaphidophoridae. It is found in North America.
