= Omophron capense =

Scientific classification
- Kingdom: Animalia
- Phylum: Arthropoda
- Clade: Pancrustacea
- Class: Insecta
- Order: Coleoptera
- Suborder: Adephaga
- Family: Carabidae
- Genus: Omophron
- Species: O. capense

Binomial name
- Omophron capense Gory, 1833

Synonyms
- Omophron suturale Guérin-Méneville, 1842; Omophron dominicense Chaudoir, 1868

Species of beetle

Omophron capense is a species of beetle of the Carabidae family. This species is found in Botswana, Mozambique, Namibia, South Africa, Zambia and Zimbabwe.

Adults have a length of 5–6 mm. The elytra, the sides of the pronotum and the head are yellow, with a metallic green pattern.

== Taxonomy ==
Omophron dominicense was described from a specimen with the label S Domingo, which was later determined to be a mislabel. The type specimen was studied by S.W. Nichols in 1983 and synonymy with O. capensis was established, but not published at the time. The synonymy was formally published in 2023.
