= Ceuthophilus utahensis =

Scientific classification
- Domain: Eukaryota
- Kingdom: Animalia
- Phylum: Arthropoda
- Class: Insecta
- Order: Orthoptera
- Suborder: Ensifera
- Family: Rhaphidophoridae
- Genus: Ceuthophilus
- Species: C. utahensis

Binomial name
- Ceuthophilus utahensis Thomas, 1876

Species of cricket-like animal

Ceuthophilus utahensis, the Utah camel cricket, is a species of camel crickets in the family Rhaphidophoridae. It is found in North America.
