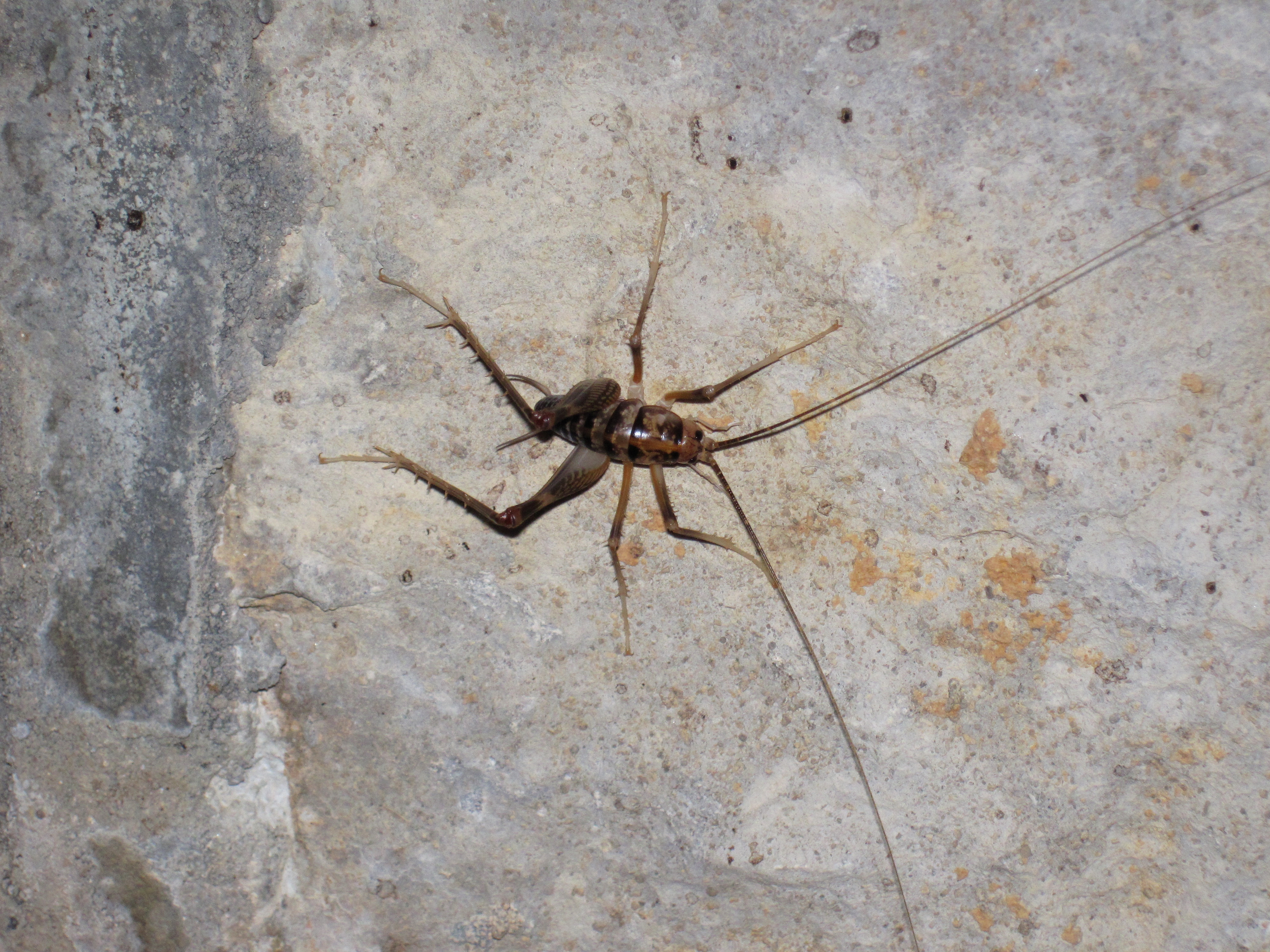

Scientific classification
- Domain: Eukaryota
- Kingdom: Animalia
- Phylum: Arthropoda
- Class: Insecta
- Order: Orthoptera
- Suborder: Ensifera
- Family: Rhaphidophoridae
- Genus: Ceuthophilus
- Species: C. stygius

Binomial name
- Ceuthophilus stygius (Scudder, 1861)

= Ceuthophilus stygius =

Species of cricket-like animal

Ceuthophilus stygius, known generally as the Kentucky cave cricket or cave camel cricket, is a species of camel cricket in the family Rhaphidophoridae. It is found in North America.

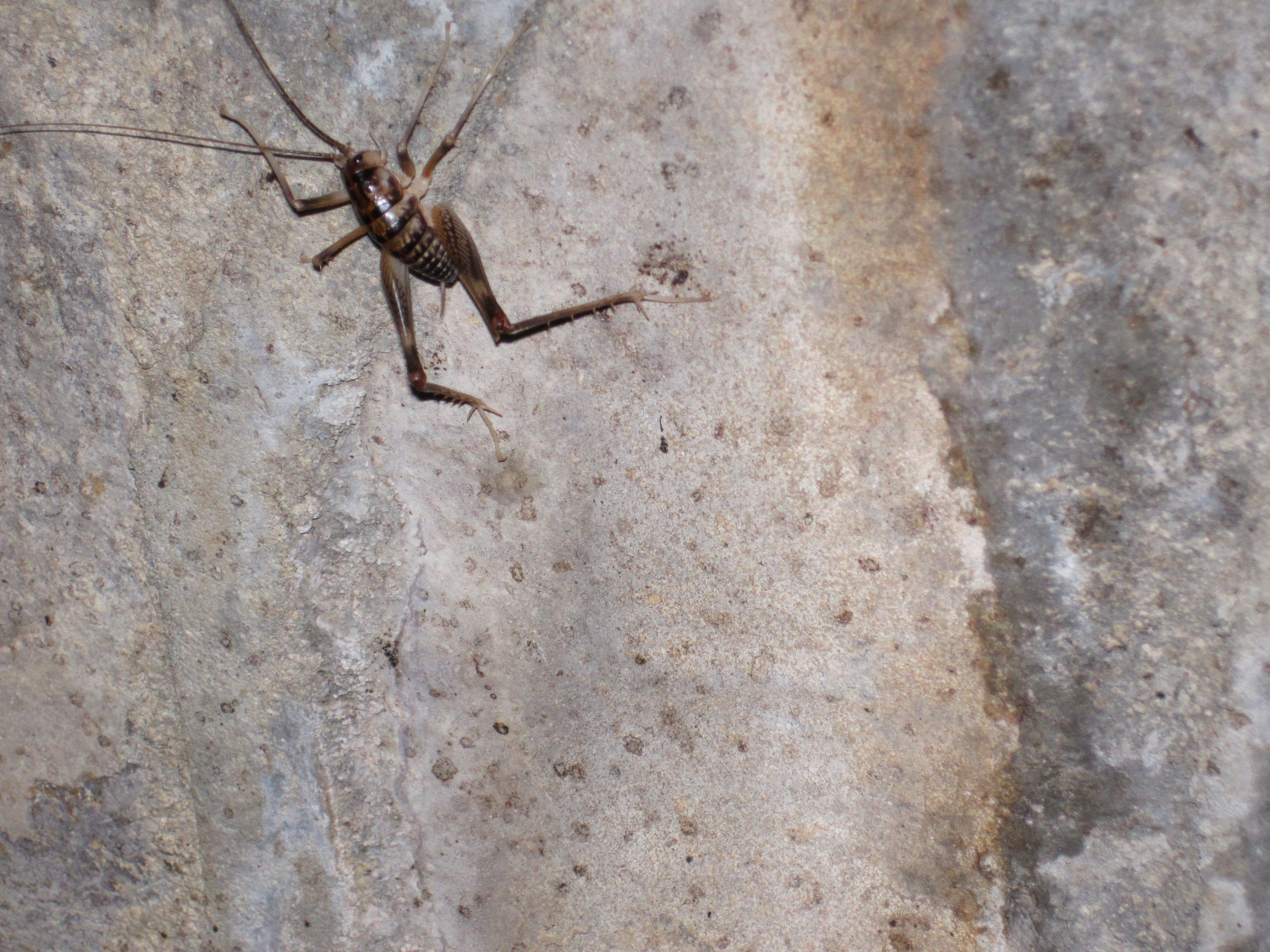
Kentucky cave cricket, Ceuthophilus stygius
