= Phanetta =

Scientific classification
- Kingdom: Animalia
- Phylum: Arthropoda
- Subphylum: Chelicerata
- Class: Arachnida
- Order: Araneae
- Infraorder: Araneomorphae
- Family: Linyphiidae
- Genus: Phanetta; Keyserling, 1886
- Species: P. subterranea

Binomial name
- Phanetta subterranea (Emerton, 1875)

Genus of spiders

Phanetta is a monotypic genus of North American dwarf spiders containing the single species, Phanetta subterranea. It was first described by Eugen von Keyserling in 1886, and has only been found in the United States.
