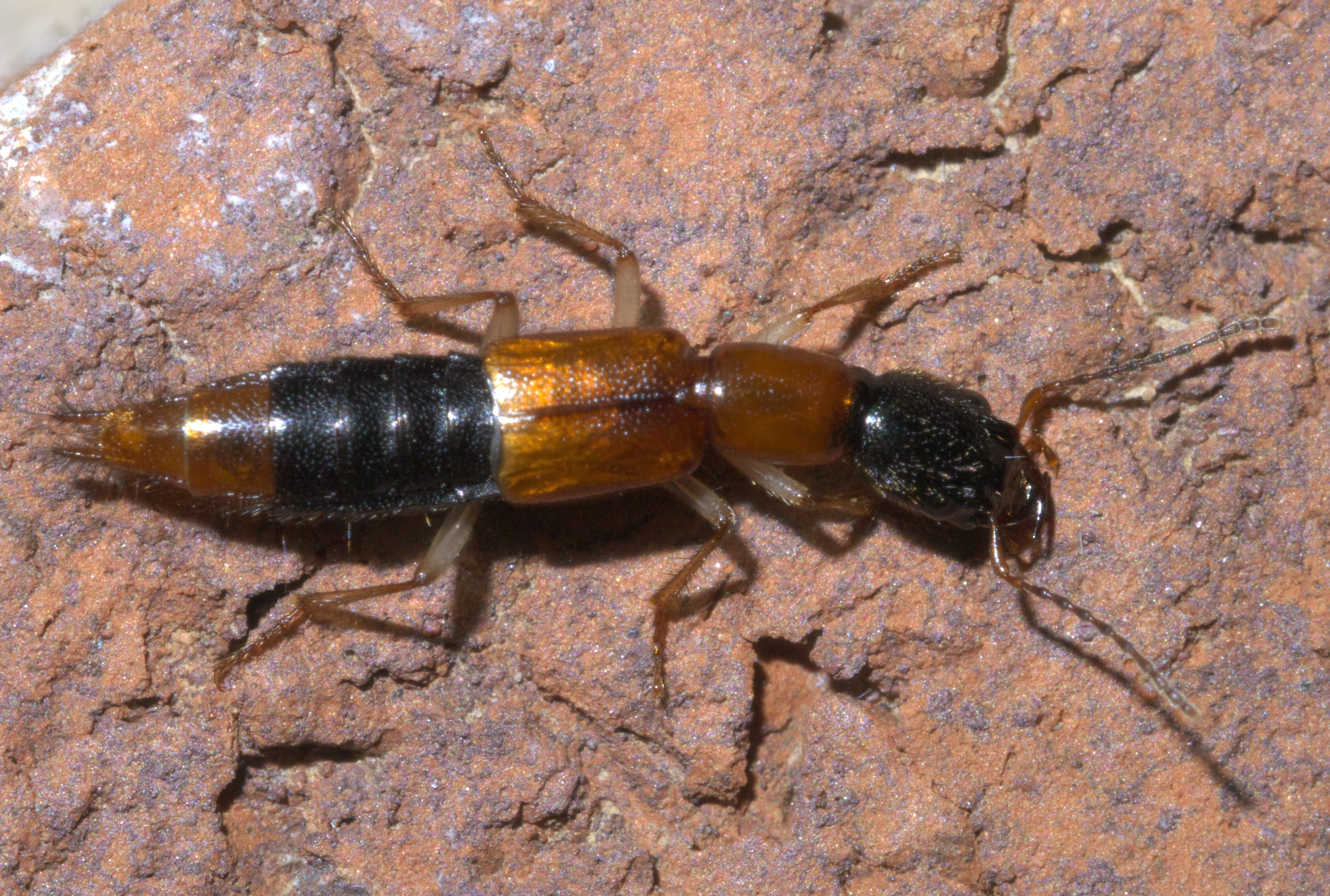

Scientific classification
- Kingdom: Animalia
- Phylum: Arthropoda
- Clade: Pancrustacea
- Class: Insecta
- Order: Coleoptera
- Suborder: Polyphaga
- Infraorder: Staphyliniformia
- Family: Staphylinidae
- Subtribe: Cryptobiina
- Genus: Homaeotarsus; Hochhuth, 1851

= Homaeotarsus =

Genus of beetles

Homaeotarsus is a genus of rove beetles in the family Staphylinidae. There are about 16 described species in Homaeotarsus.

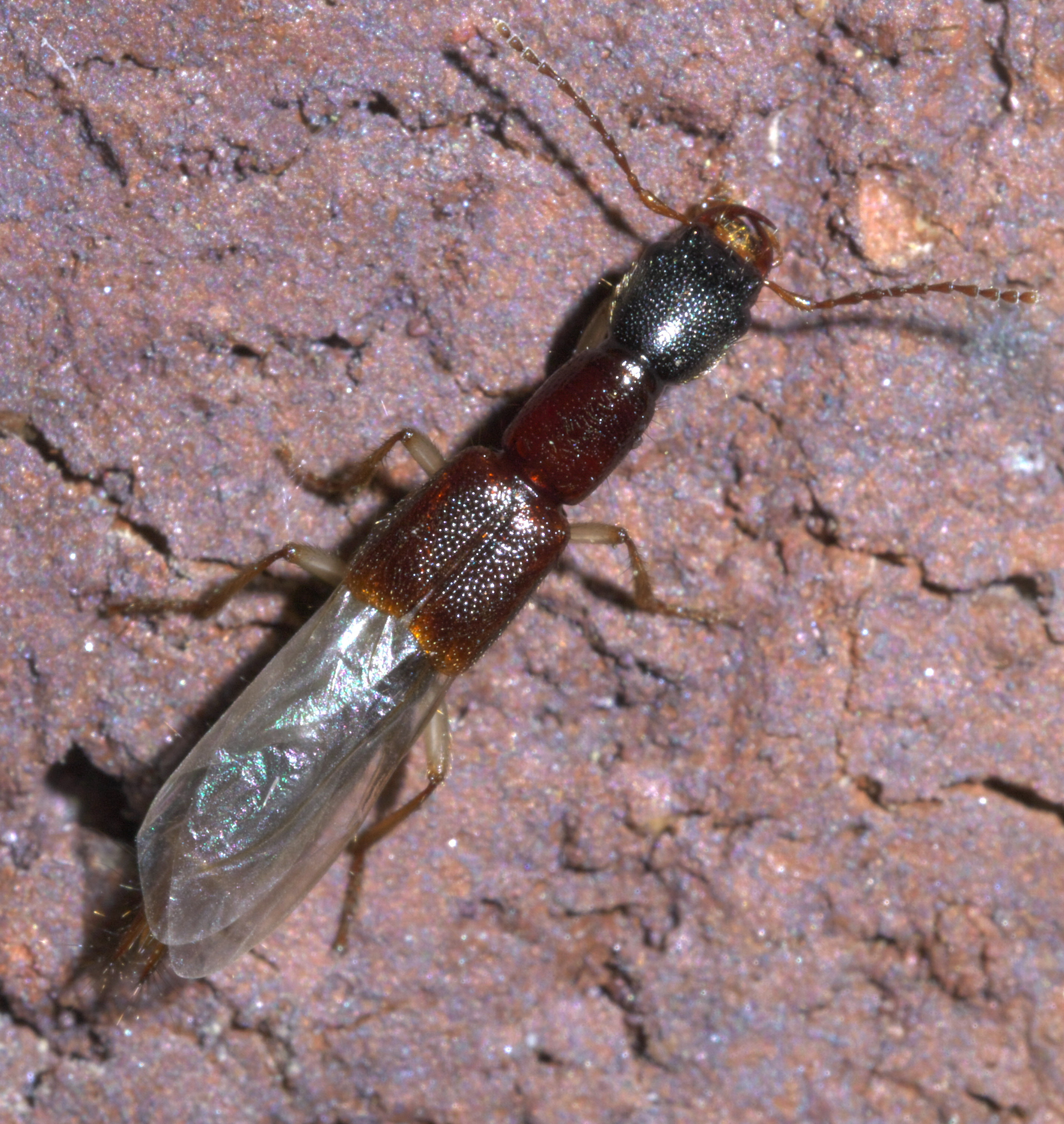

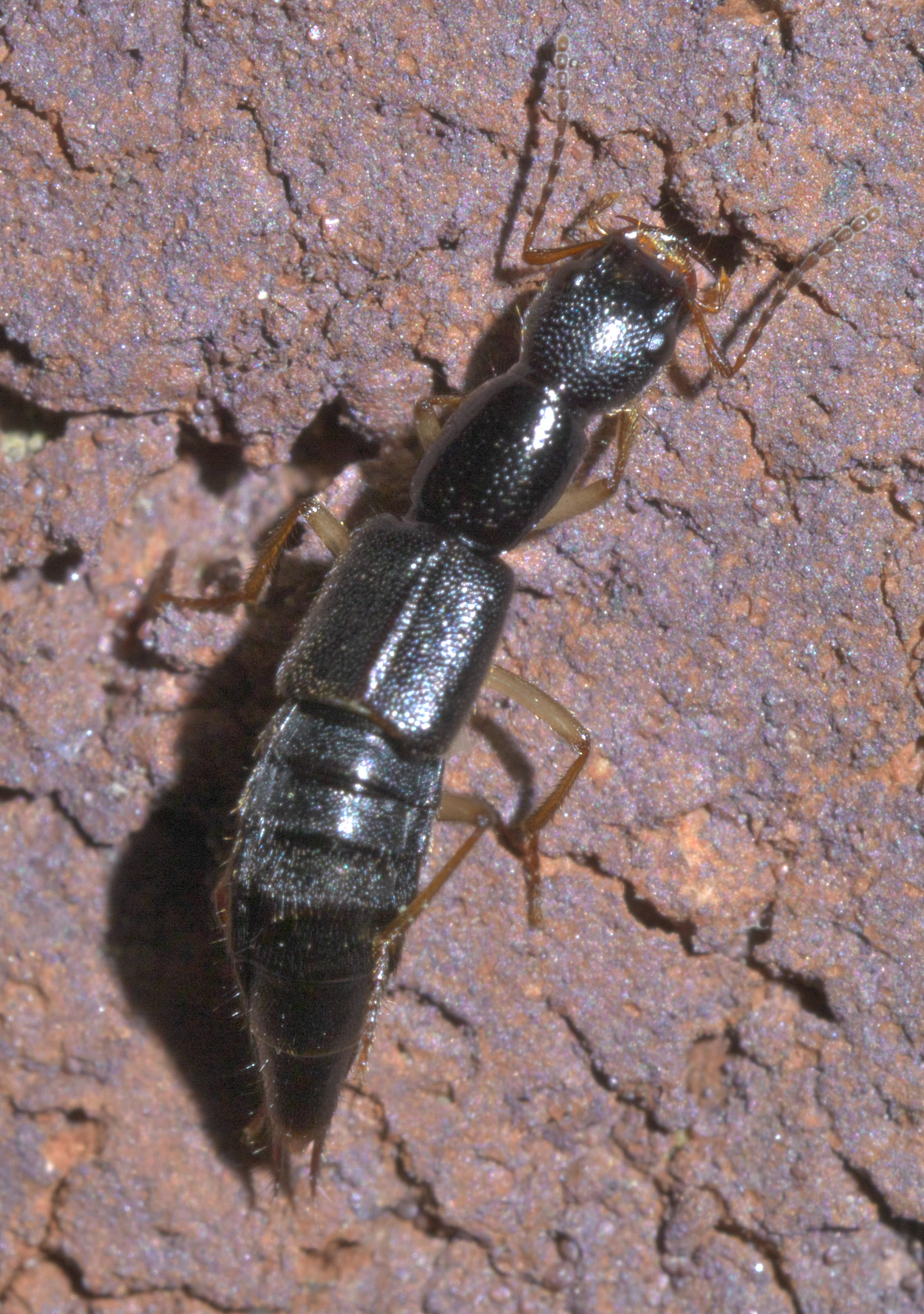

== Species ==
These 16 species belong to the genus Homaeotarsus:

- Homaeotarsus badius^{b}
- Homaeotarsus bicolor^{b}
- Homaeotarsus carolinus (Erichson, 1840)^{g}
- Homaeotarsus ceylanensis Kraatz, 1859^{c g}
- Homaeotarsus chaudoirii Hochhuth, 1851^{g}
- Homaeotarsus cinctus (Say, 1830)^{b}
- Homaeotarsus cribratus (LeConte, 1863)^{g b}
- Homaeotarsus denticulatus Assing V., 2009^{c g}
- Homaeotarsus floridanus^{b}
- Homaeotarsus japonicus Sharp, 1874^{c g}
- Homaeotarsus kurosai Ito, 1996^{c g}
- Homaeotarsus marginatus Motschulsky, 1858^{c g}
- Homaeotarsus pallipes (Gravenhorst, 1802)^{g b}
- Homaeotarsus parallelus^{b}
- Homaeotarsus sellatus (LeConte, 1863)^{g b}
- Homaeotarsus strenuus^{b}

Data sources: i = ITIS, c = Catalogue of Life, g = GBIF, b = Bugguide.net
