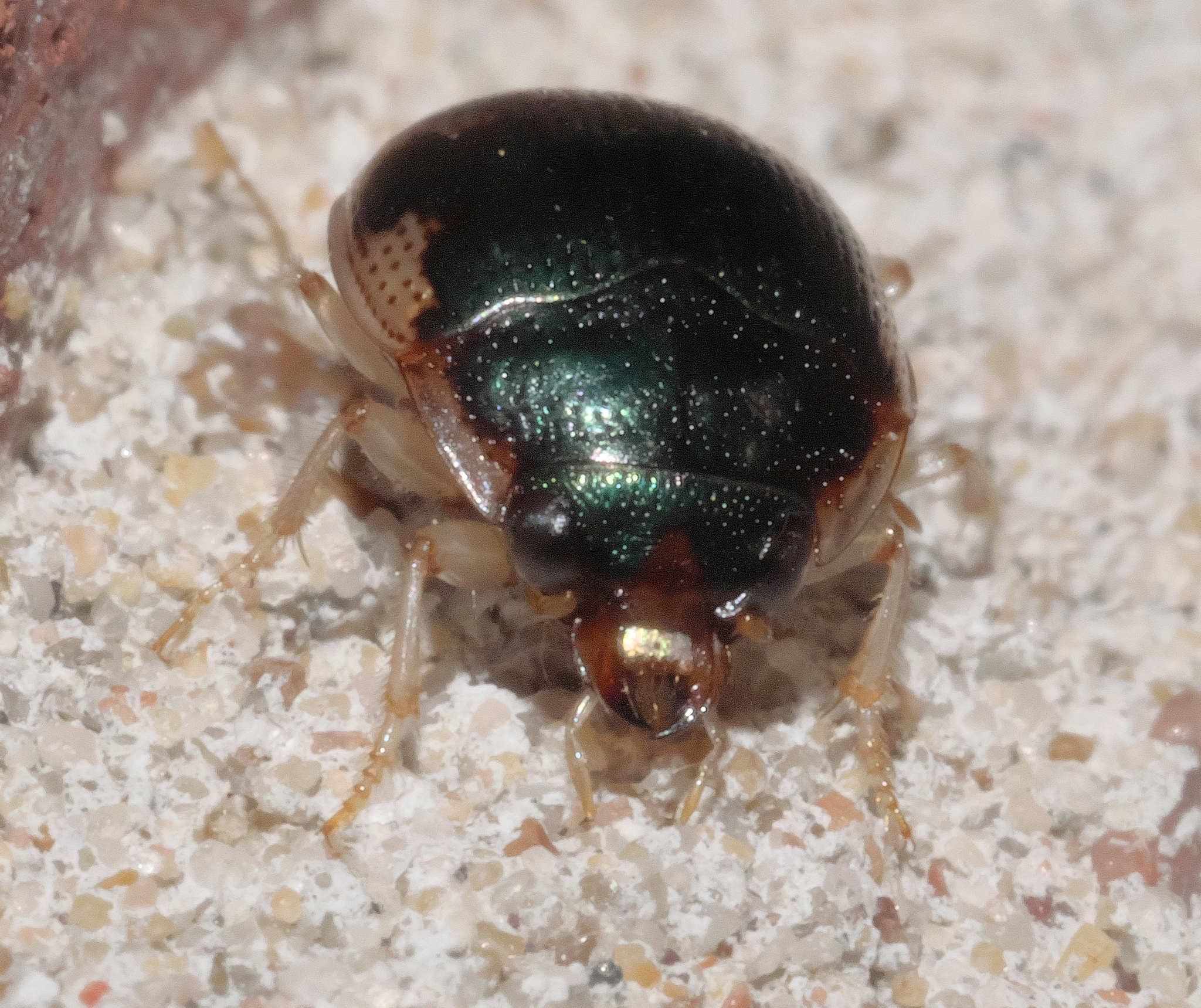
- Omophron americanum, Oklahoma

Scientific classification
- Kingdom: Animalia
- Phylum: Arthropoda
- Class: Insecta
- Order: Coleoptera
- Suborder: Adephaga
- Family: Carabidae
- Genus: Omophron
- Species: O. americanum

Binomial name
- Omophron americanum Dejean, 1831

Synonyms
- Homophron proximum Chandler, 1941; Homophron tanneri Chandler, 1941; Omophron proximum Chandler, 1941; Omophron tanneri Chandler, 1941; Omophron illustre Casey, 1920; Omophron lengi Casey, 1920; Omophron fontinale Casey, 1913; Omophron iridescens Casey, 1913; Omophron lacustre Casey, 1897; Omophron texanum Casey, 1897; Omophron saii Kirby, 1837

= Omophron americanum =

Species of beetle

Omophron americanum, the American round sand beetle, is a species of ground beetle in the family Carabidae. It is found in, as well as native to, North America, ranging across most of the United States and Canada, except British Columbia.

Omophron americanum has a broad and rather flat shape, with a length between 5.1 and 7.0 mm. Reddish-yellow with dark markings, its colour pattern is variable on its upper surface, with a darker, brown underside. It has a striated elytron, a V-shaped pale area on the frons, a punctuated metasternum, and two setae on the mesocoxa.

Its habitat is the immediate vicinity of usually standing waters, on bare or sparsely vegetated sandy or clay substrates. It exists in altitudes between 260 and 2,200 m.

Copulation occurs between April and May. The female is typically gravid (pregnant) between May and June. Omophron americanum moults and becomes teneral between July and September. It overwinters in the adult stage.

These beetles are gregarious. They also stridulate.
