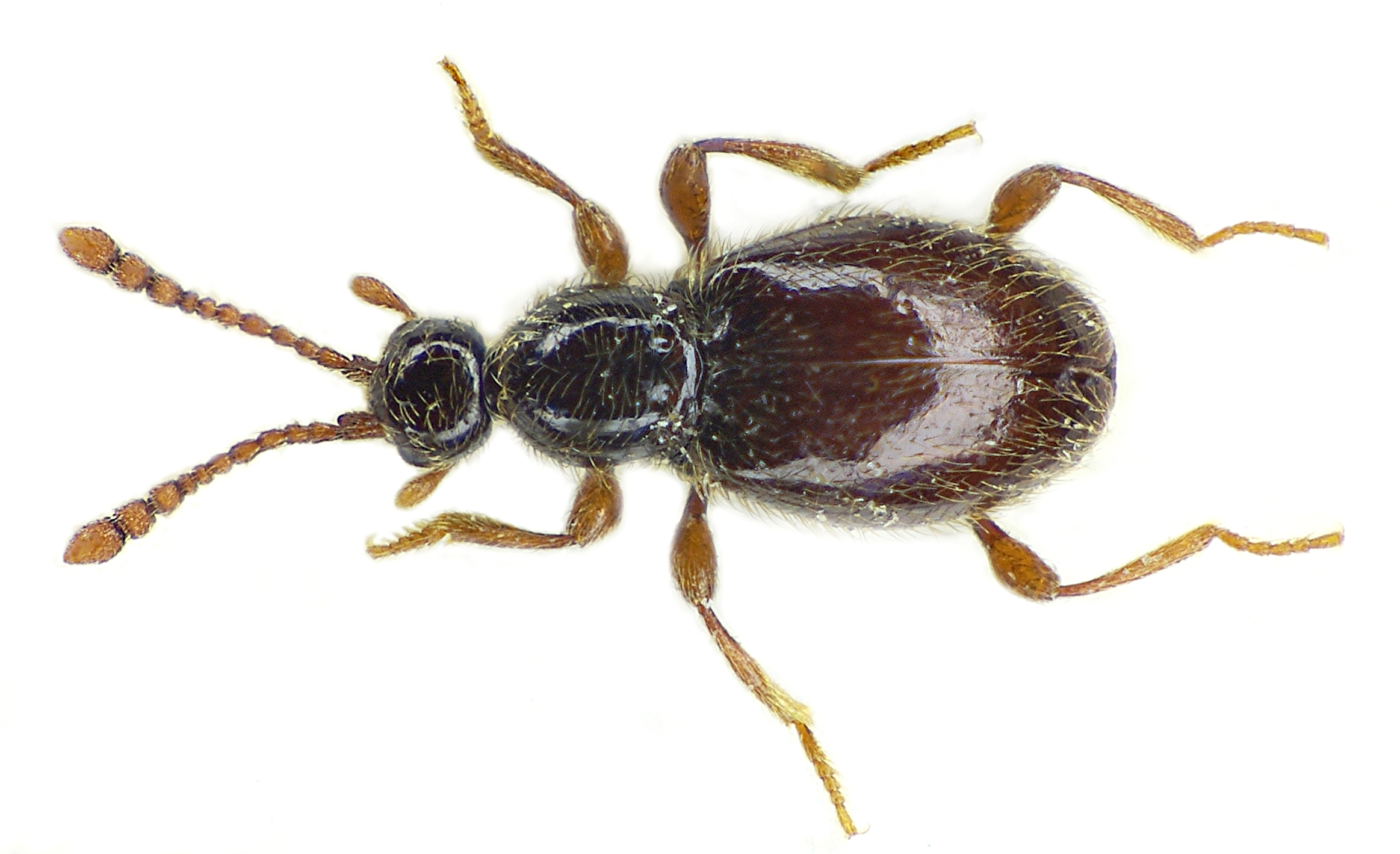
- Scydmaenus tarsatus

Scientific classification
- Kingdom: Animalia
- Phylum: Arthropoda
- Class: Insecta
- Order: Coleoptera
- Suborder: Polyphaga
- Infraorder: Staphyliniformia
- Family: Staphylinidae
- Genus: Scydmaenus; Latreille, 1802

= Scydmaenus =

Genus of beetles

Scydmaenus is a genus of beetles belonging to the family Staphylinidae.

The genus has almost cosmopolitan distribution.

Species:

- Scydmaenus abnormis Franz, 1986
- Scydmaenus abyssinicus (Reitter, 1880)
