= Ceuthophilus latens =

Scientific classification
- Domain: Eukaryota
- Kingdom: Animalia
- Phylum: Arthropoda
- Class: Insecta
- Order: Orthoptera
- Suborder: Ensifera
- Family: Rhaphidophoridae
- Genus: Ceuthophilus
- Species: C. latens

Binomial name
- Ceuthophilus latens Scudder, 1863

Species of cricket-like animal

Ceuthophilus latens, the black-sided camel cricket, is a species of camel cricket in the family Rhaphidophoridae. It is found in North America.
