= Prionochaeta =

Scientific classification
- Kingdom: Animalia
- Phylum: Arthropoda
- Class: Insecta
- Order: Coleoptera
- Suborder: Polyphaga
- Infraorder: Staphyliniformia
- Family: Leiodidae
- Tribe: Cholevini
- Genus: Prionochaeta; Horn, 1880

Genus of beetles

Prionochaeta is a genus of small carrion beetles in the family Leiodidae. There is one described species in Prionochaeta, P. opaca.
