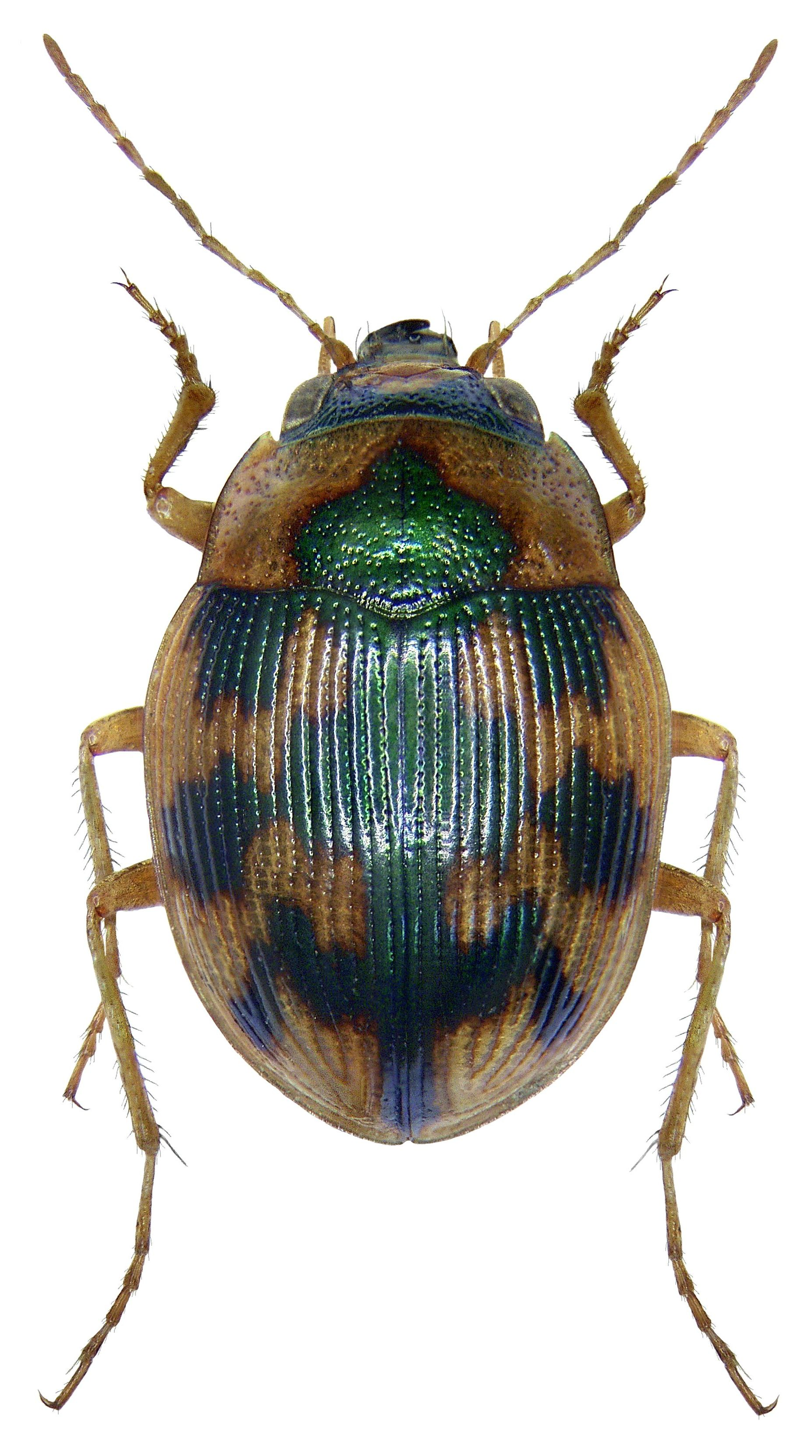

Scientific classification
- Kingdom: Animalia
- Phylum: Arthropoda
- Clade: Pancrustacea
- Class: Insecta
- Order: Coleoptera
- Suborder: Adephaga
- Family: Carabidae
- Genus: Omophron
- Species: O. limbatum

Binomial name
- Omophron limbatum (Fabricius, 1777)

Synonyms
- Carabus limbatus Fabricius, 1777; Omophron kraussei Csiki, 1927; Omophron confluens Chobaut, 1923; Omophron solskyi Zaitzev, 1916; Omophron baenningeri Krausse, 1915; Omophron sokolari Roubal, 1910; Omophron corcyreum J.Sahlberg, 1903; Epactius maculatipennis Pic, 1901; Omophron kanalense Fauvel, 1882; Omophron disjunctum Dalla Torre, 1877; Nitidula coccinelloides Petagna, 1819; Carabus dubius Herbst, 1779

= Omophron limbatum =

Species of beetle

Omophron limbatum, the spangled button beetle, is a species of beetle of the Carabidae family. This species is found in Great Britain, Denmark, Sweden, France, Belgium, Netherlands, Germany, Switzerland, Austria, Czechia, Slovakia, Hungary, Poland, Estonia, Latvia, Lithuania, Belarus, Ukraine, Portugal, Spain, Italy, Slovenia, Croatia, Bosnia-Herzegovina, former Yugoslavia, Serbia, North Macedonia, Albania, Greece, Bulgaria, Romania, Moldova, Algeria, Tunisia, Syria, Turkey, Iran, Georgia, Armenia, Azerbaijan, Kazakhstan, Uzbekistan, Kyrgyzstan, Tadzhikistan, Afghanistan and Russia. Its habitat consists of the sandy margins of fresh water.

Adults reach a size of 5-6.5 mm and are pale yellow to brown in colour with metallic green markings.

Omophron limbatum lives on sandy riverbanks which are exposed and they are very sensitive to habitat changes such as dam construction and vegetation overgrowth. This makes it a good indicator of environmental disturbance.
