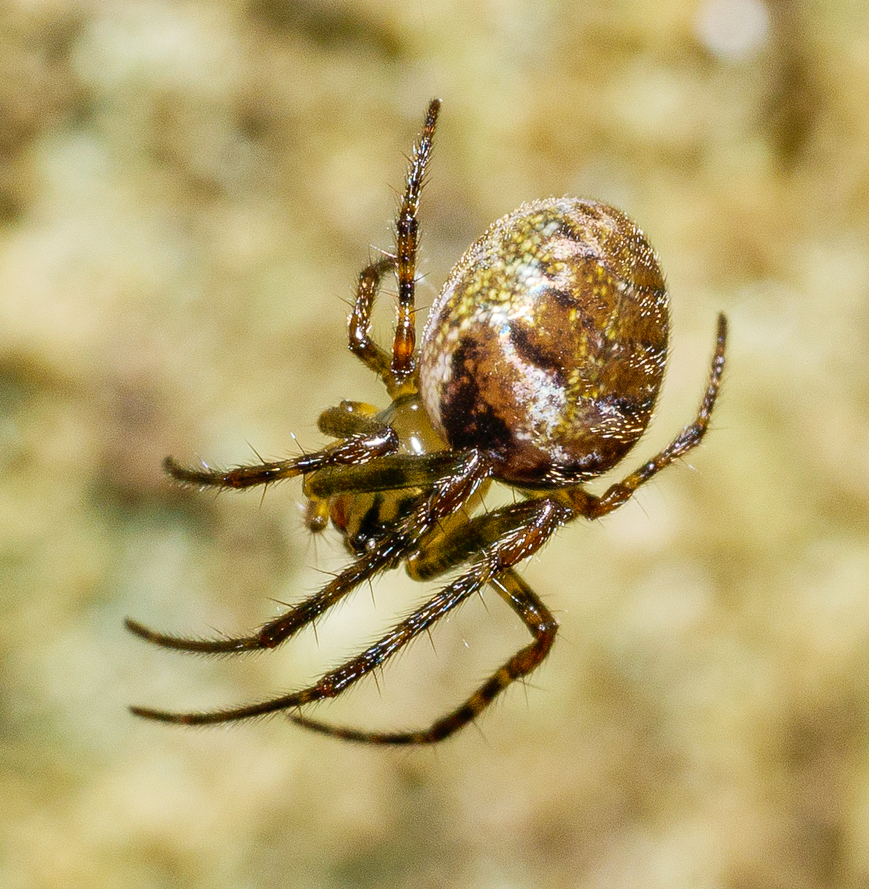
- Taraire rufolineata

Scientific classification
- Kingdom: Animalia
- Phylum: Arthropoda
- Subphylum: Chelicerata
- Class: Arachnida
- Order: Araneae
- Infraorder: Araneomorphae
- Family: Tetragnathidae
- Genus: Taraire; Álvarez-Padilla, Kallal & Hormiga, 2020

Type species
- Linyphia rufo-lineata (Urquhart, 1889)

Species
- Taraire oculta Álvarez-Padilla, Kallal & Hormiga, 2020; Taraire rufolineata (Urquhart, 1889)

= Taraire =

Genus of spiders

Taraire is a small genus of Polynesian long-jawed orb-weavers. The genus was first described by A. Álvarez-Padilla, R. J. Kallal and Gustavo Hormiga in 2020, and it has only been found in New Zealand. They build vertical orb webs near forest floors, and can be found resting in the center. The genus name is a reference to Beilschmiedia tarairi, the native New Zealand tree that they are commonly found in.

As of April 2022 it contains only two species: T. oculta and T. rufolineata, one newly described and one transferred from Meta. Though they are closely related to species of Tawhai, their exact relation to other genera in the family is still unclear due to inconclusive phylogenetic analyses.

== See also ==
- Linyphia
- Meta
