= Hadenoecus cumberlandicus =

Scientific classification
- Kingdom: Animalia
- Phylum: Arthropoda
- Clade: Pancrustacea
- Class: Insecta
- Order: Orthoptera
- Suborder: Ensifera
- Family: Rhaphidophoridae
- Genus: Hadenoecus
- Species: H. cumberlandicus

Binomial name
- Hadenoecus cumberlandicus Hubbell & Norton, 1978

Species of cricket

Hadenoecus cumberlandicus, the Cumberland cave cricket, is a species of camel cricket in the family Rhaphidophoridae. It is found in North America along the west of the Cumberland Plateau.

== Habitat ==
The Cumberland cave cricket aggregates into groups or clusters within cave wall recesses and is considered vital to cave community ecosystems, noted as a keystone species.

== Features and reproduction ==
The crickets aggregate to minimize dehydration using specialized pheromones that reduce mobility on contact, acting as an anti-predator defense tactic from cave spiders. It has been found to have a co-occurrence relationship with the cave orb weaver spider Meta ovalis. Some populations of H. cumberlandicus are parthenogenic.

== Identification ==
This cricket has very long legs, and a dark body. Its body is broken into scale sections. The antennae are also longer than that of an average camel cricket.
