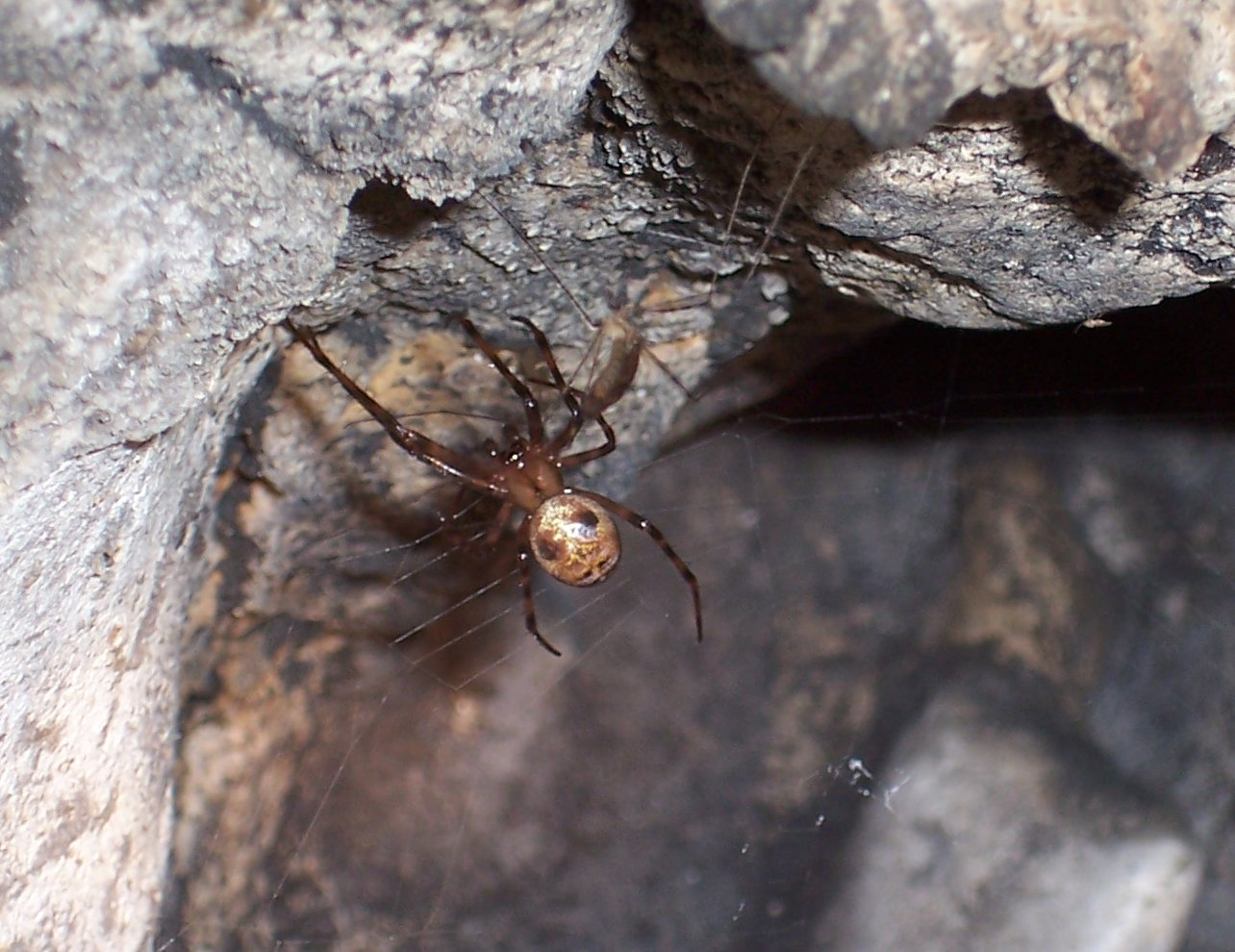

Scientific classification
- Kingdom: Animalia
- Phylum: Arthropoda
- Subphylum: Chelicerata
- Class: Arachnida
- Order: Araneae
- Infraorder: Araneomorphae
- Family: Tetragnathidae
- Genus: Meta
- Species: M. menardi

Binomial name
- Meta menardi (Latreille, 1804)

= Meta menardi =

European cave spider

Species of spider

Meta menardi, the European cave spider, is a long-jawed orb-weaving spider (family Tetragnathidae). It is also known as the orbweaving cave spider and the cave orbweaver.

== Habitat ==
They have a natural range extending from Scandinavia to North Africa and from Europe to Korea; there are also transplanted populations as far apart as Japan and Madagascar.

The adult spiders are photophobic and live in places free from light, frequently in caves and tunnels, though they can sometimes be seen outside of caves and mines as they will emerge around dusk to hunt, often using a single silk lasso line and swinging down upon their prey. They are often found in areas that are frequented by bats. The spiders are most often observed in railway tunnels and mines since these are more likely to be visited by humans. The young spiders are, after several instars (and in contrast to the adults), strongly attracted to light—probably an evolutionary adaptation which ensures the spread of the species to new areas (see Life cycle for further details).

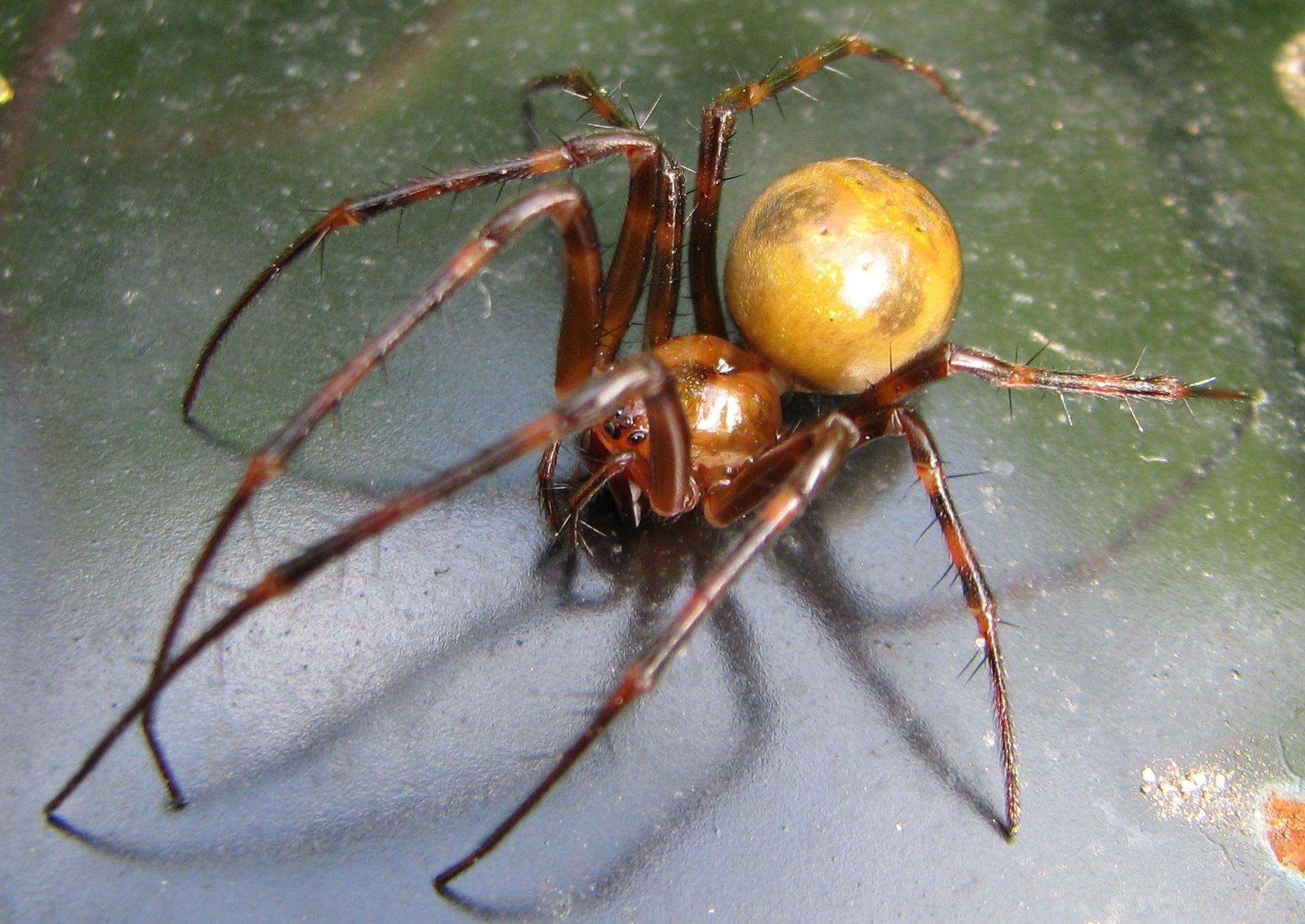
Meta menardi ♀

== Morphology ==
They are shiny satin black to reddish brown in colour, often having a different-coloured rear body which varies from black, brown or even olive green and are one of the largest spiders found in the United Kingdom, adults reaching roughly 5 cm legspan and 15 mm body length. However, the giant house spider, cardinal spider and the raft spider are larger. It is widespread and locally abundant, although rarely noticed due to its habits. They are neither endangered nor protected in the UK.

Meta menardi closely resembles Meta bourneti, which sports a fainter mark on its abdomen and no rings on its legs.

The ecology of the two species is very similar. On the other hand, the two species seems to exhibit different tolerance to the microclimatic variations within the cave, which emerged as the main factors determining the differentiation of their niche.

Cave spiders feed on smaller invertebrates, most frequently myriapods and slugs.

The European cave spider is not dangerous to humans and although (in common with nearly all spiders) they have venom, its effect on large mammals is negligible. They are unlikely to bite if carefully handled but if sufficiently provoked they are capable of inflicting an unpleasant "nip". They are non-aggressive and generally slow moving and are regarded (by arachnophiles) as "gentle giants".

== Life cycle ==
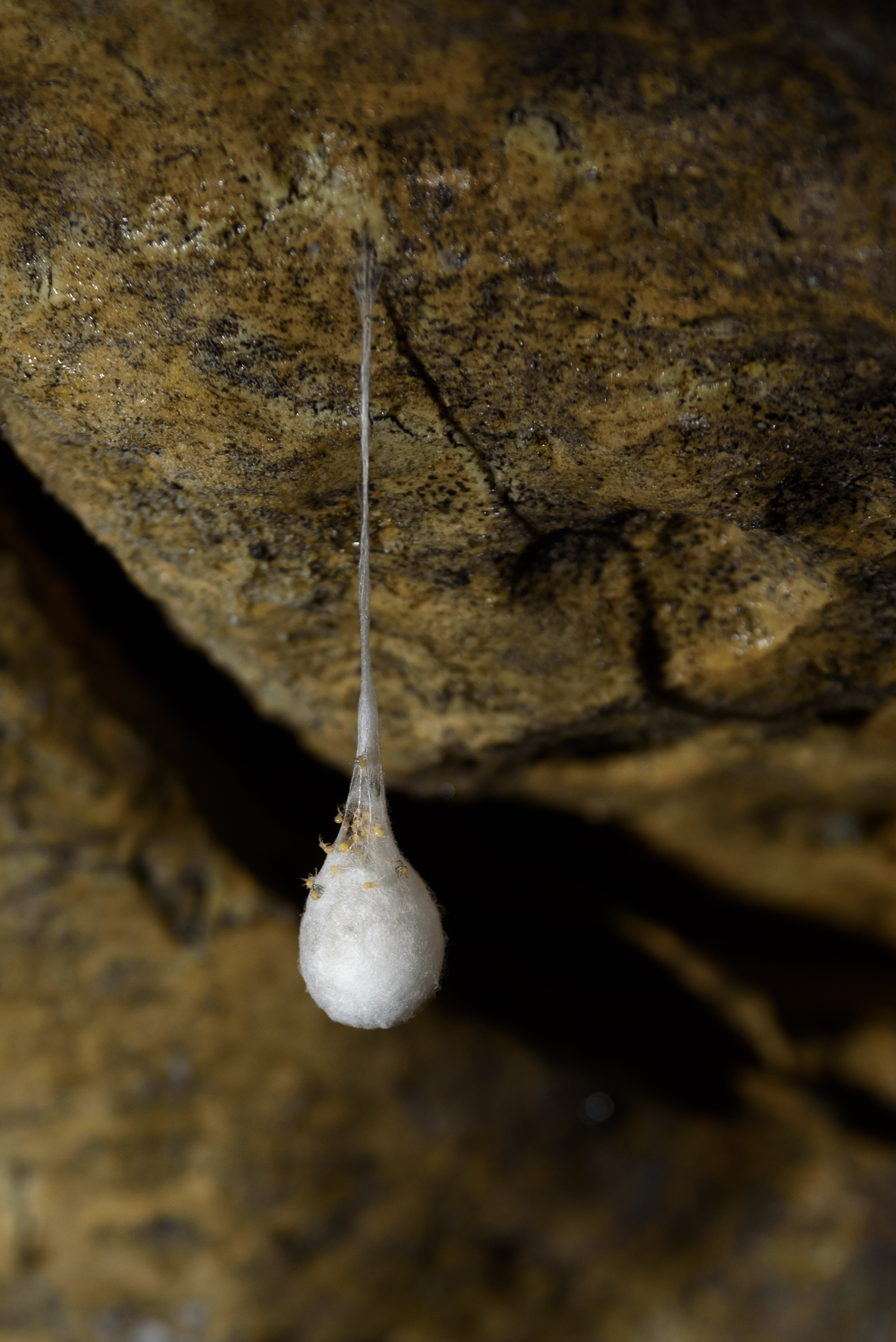
Meta menardi cocoon (egg sac) with spiderlings visible hanging from ceiling in Hohler Fels cave

Egg sacs are tear-shaped white pendants (sometimes with a slightly yellow centre) usually hanging from the roof of the habitat by a silk thread approximately 20 mm (0.8 inches) long. Egg sacs are usually laid in the vicinity of the cave entrance, where the air flow velocity ranges between 0.3 and 0.6 m/s (1.0 and 2.0 ft/s).

The cocoon, which is 2–3 cm (0.8–1.2 inches) in radius, contains an average of 200 to 300 eggs and is laid near the cave entrance at the end of the summer. After hatching, the spiderlings remain in the cocoon until the first molt, feeding on the yolk. They leave the cocoon in spring, move towards the cave entrance and disperse via ballooning outside the cave.

== Media mistakes ==
In 2001, a media frenzy was caused when British Telecom engineers working in the grounds of Windsor Castle discovered a colony living in conduits and manholes. These were incorrectly described as swarms of aggressive spiders, up to 9 cm (3.5 in) in size, which a leading entomologist believed were venomous. The BBC reported that it "may be a new species or a type of spider previously thought to have been extinct for thousands of years." The initial incident was widely reported but when the species was properly identified the matter received little publicity.
