= P. domestica =

P. domestica may refer to:

- Philoeca domestica, a synonym for Malthonica ferruginea, a spider species
- Prunus domestica, a tree species
