= Euhadenoecus insolitus =

Scientific classification
- Domain: Eukaryota
- Kingdom: Animalia
- Phylum: Arthropoda
- Class: Insecta
- Order: Orthoptera
- Suborder: Ensifera
- Family: Rhaphidophoridae
- Tribe: Hadenoecini
- Genus: Euhadenoecus
- Species: E. insolitus

Binomial name
- Euhadenoecus insolitus Hubbell, 1978

Species of cricket-like animal

Euhadenoecus insolitus, the mccluney cave cricket, is a species of camel cricket in the family Rhaphidophoridae. It is found in North America. E. insolitus regularly forage outside their cave habitat except in the winter. Different populations reproduce either through sexual reproduction or parthenogenesis.
