= Hadenoecus barri =

Scientific classification
- Domain: Eukaryota
- Kingdom: Animalia
- Phylum: Arthropoda
- Class: Insecta
- Order: Orthoptera
- Suborder: Ensifera
- Family: Rhaphidophoridae
- Tribe: Hadenoecini
- Genus: Hadenoecus
- Species: H. barri

Binomial name
- Hadenoecus barri Hubbell, 1978

Species of cricket-like animal

Hadenoecus barri, or Barr's cave cricket, is a species of camel cricket in the family Rhaphidophoridae. It is found in North America.
