= Euhadenoecus fragilis =

Scientific classification
- Domain: Eukaryota
- Kingdom: Animalia
- Phylum: Arthropoda
- Class: Insecta
- Order: Orthoptera
- Suborder: Ensifera
- Family: Rhaphidophoridae
- Tribe: Hadenoecini
- Genus: Euhadenoecus
- Species: E. fragilis

Binomial name
- Euhadenoecus fragilis Hubbell, 1978

Species of cricket-like animal

Euhadenoecus fragilis, the tawneys cave cricket, is a species of camel cricket in the family Rhaphidophoridae. It is found in North America.
