= Tegenaria decolorata =

Scientific classification
- Kingdom: Animalia
- Phylum: Arthropoda
- Subphylum: Chelicerata
- Class: Arachnida
- Order: Araneae
- Infraorder: Araneomorphae
- Family: Agelenidae
- Genus: Tegenaria
- Species: T. decolorata

Binomial name
- Tegenaria decolorata Kratochvil & Miller, 1940

Species of spider

Tegenaria decolorata is a funnel-web spider found in Croatia.
