= Tegenaria sorani =

Scientific classification
- Kingdom: Animalia
- Phylum: Arthropoda
- Subphylum: Chelicerata
- Class: Arachnida
- Order: Araneae
- Infraorder: Araneomorphae
- Family: Agelenidae
- Genus: Tegenaria
- Species: T. sorani

Binomial name
- Tegenaria sorani Zamani et al.

Species of spider

Tegenaria sorani is a species of spider in the family Agelenidae described in 2024 Zamani et al. The species was identified along with four other species as part of a study documenting the spider fauna of Iraqi Kurdistan. This spider is known from Erbil Governorate in the Kurdistan Region of Iraq.

== Description ==
The male holotype measures 6.55 mm in total length, with a carapace measuring 3.75 mm long and 2.70 mm wide. The carapace and sternum are yellowish brown, with the carapace darker in the cephalic region. The labium, chelicerae and maxillae are brownish, while the legs are similarly coloured to the carapace and have faint annulations. The abdomen is light beige with scattered dark grey patches on its dorsal surface and no distinctive pattern ventrally.

The species is most similar to Tegenaria domestica and Tegenaria alamto. It can be distinguished from these species by the absence of the prolateral arm of the conductor, a thin embolus originating at approximately the 10 o'clock position, and an unarmed palpal tibia. These characteristics distinguish its male reproductive structures from those of related species. The female of the species remains unknown as the sample size of the study was small.

== Distribution ==
Tegenaria sorani is known only from its type locality in Erbil Governorate, Iraqi Kurdistan. The specimens used in its original description were collected from Beston Cave on Bradost Mountain, near Soran, at coordinates 36°42′29.8″N 44°23′32.5″E, on 8 May 2023.

== Taxonomy ==
The species was formally described by Alireza Zamani and Yuri M. Marusik in a 2024 scientific paper co-authored with Farhad A. Khudhur and published in the journal Zootaxa. The description was based on three male specimens: a holotype and two paratypes. All three specimens were collected at the type locality and deposited in the Zoological Museum of the University of Turku in Finland.

The specific epithet sorani refers to Sorani, a dialect of the Kurdish language spoken throughout much of Iraqi Kurdistan and in parts of western Iran, including Kurdistan, Kermanshah and West Azerbaijan provinces.
