= Tegenaria abchasica =

Scientific classification
- Kingdom: Animalia
- Phylum: Arthropoda
- Subphylum: Chelicerata
- Class: Arachnida
- Order: Araneae
- Infraorder: Araneomorphae
- Family: Agelenidae
- Genus: Tegenaria
- Species: T. abchasica

Binomial name
- Tegenaria abchasica Charitonov, 1941

Species of spider

Tegenaria abchasica is a spider species found in Russia and Georgia.

== Description ==
Tegenaria abchasica differs from all other known species in the genus Tegenaria by the presence of two dark spots on the upper surface of the cephalothorax at the junction of the head and thorax. There is also a characteristic pattern on the under surface of the cephalothorax, consisting of a paler central line with a pair of lighter spots on either side (sometimes more than one pair). T. abchasica is variable in size; one female had a carapace of about 3.5 mm (0.14 in) long and an abdomen of about the same length. The male is somewhat smaller, particularly the abdomen. The longest leg is the fourth, around 13–14 mm (0.5–0.6 in) long in total. The legs have yellow femora with four dark gray-green half rings, yellow patellae, darkened distally (away from the body); yellow tibiae with three half rings coloured as the femora; and brown metatarsi, also with three similar half rings.

Males appear to live only a year, maturing in August and September and dying in the winter; females hibernate.

== Taxonomy ==
Tegenaria abchasica was first described in 1941 by D.E. Charitonov. Initially only the male was known; the female was first described in 2008.

== Distribution and habitat ==
Tegenaria abchasica is known from Krasnodar Krai in Russia and neighbouring Abkhazia in Georgia. First found in caves in Abkhazia, in Russia it was found in more open habitats (yew-boxwood woodland).
