= Tegenaria taurica =

Scientific classification
- Kingdom: Animalia
- Phylum: Arthropoda
- Subphylum: Chelicerata
- Class: Arachnida
- Order: Araneae
- Infraorder: Araneomorphae
- Family: Agelenidae
- Genus: Tegenaria
- Species: T. taurica

Binomial name
- Tegenaria taurica Charitonov, 1947

Species of spider

Tegenaria taurica is a spider species found in Ukraine and Georgia.
