= Tegenaria croatica =

Scientific classification
- Kingdom: Animalia
- Phylum: Arthropoda
- Subphylum: Chelicerata
- Class: Arachnida
- Order: Araneae
- Infraorder: Araneomorphae
- Family: Agelenidae
- Genus: Tegenaria
- Species: T. croatica

Binomial name
- Tegenaria croatica Bolzern, Durckhardt & Hänggi, 2013

Species of spider

Tegenaria croatica is a funnel-web spider found in Croatia.
