= Tegenaria longimana =

Scientific classification
- Kingdom: Animalia
- Phylum: Arthropoda
- Subphylum: Chelicerata
- Class: Arachnida
- Order: Araneae
- Infraorder: Araneomorphae
- Family: Agelenidae
- Genus: Tegenaria
- Species: T. longimana

Binomial name
- Tegenaria longimana Simon, 1898

Species of spider

Tegenaria longimana is a spider species found in Turkey, Georgia and Russia.
