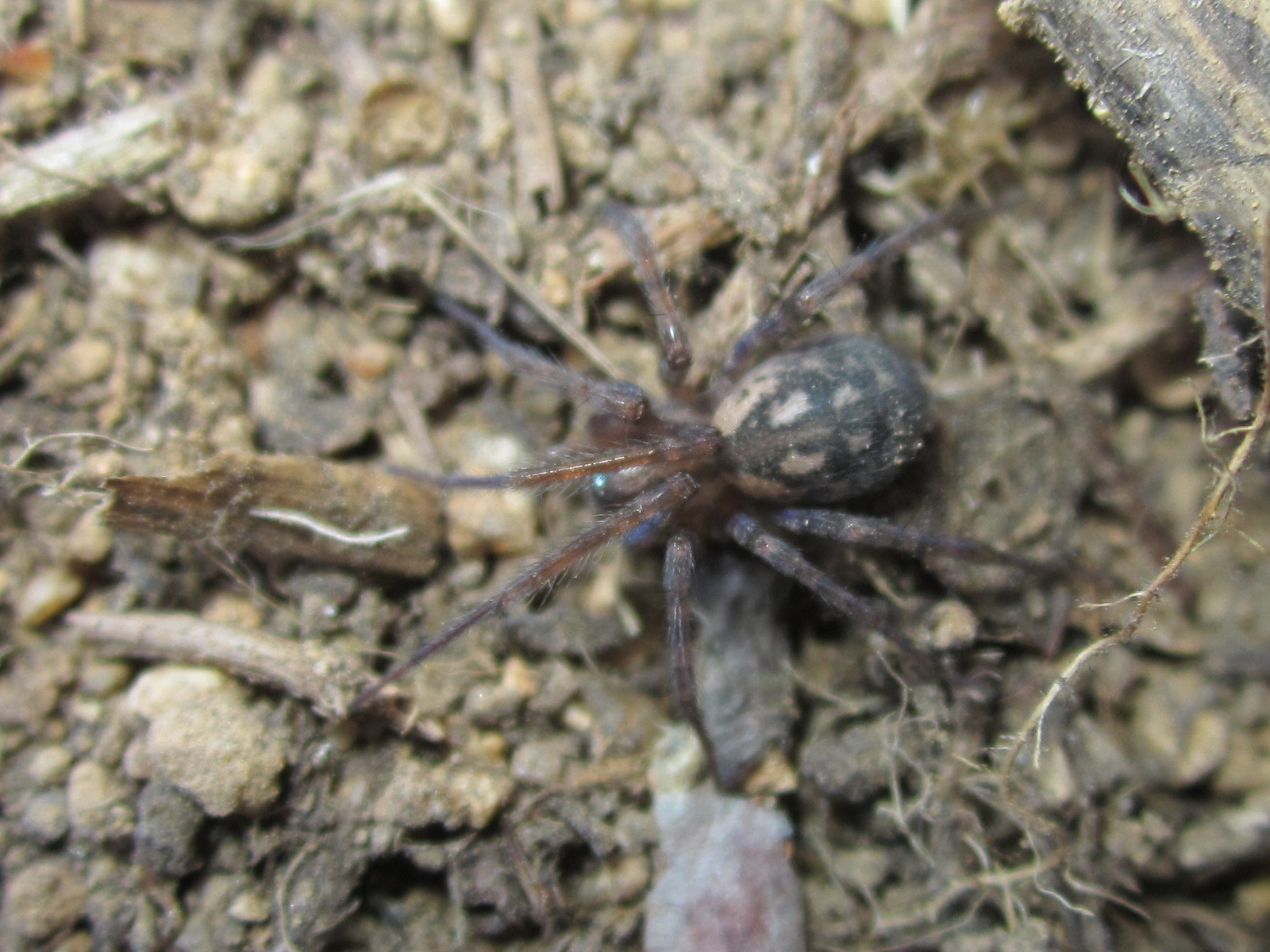
- from Chile
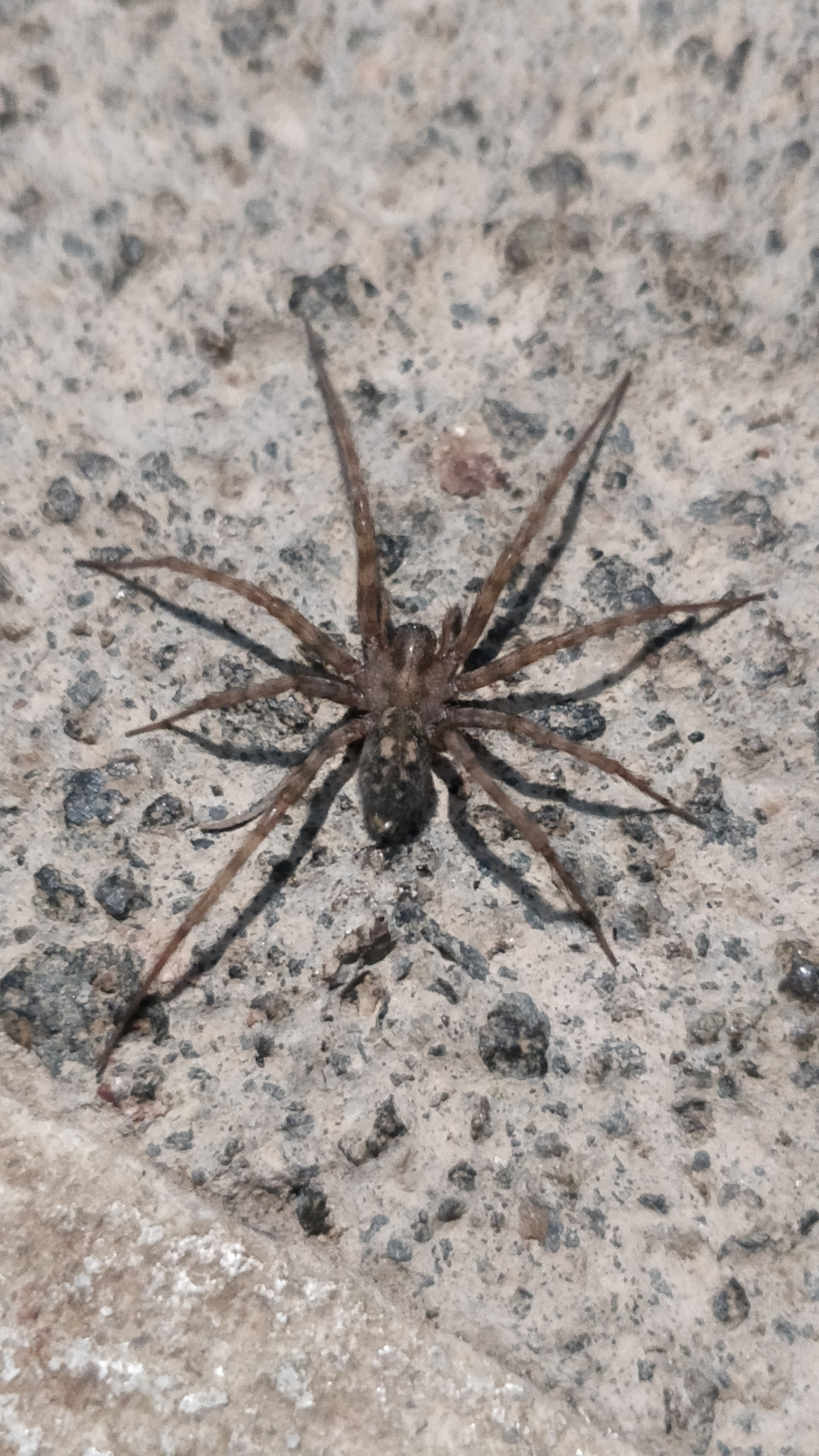
- from Spain

Conservation status
- Least Concern (IUCN 3.1)

Scientific classification
- Kingdom: Animalia
- Phylum: Arthropoda
- Subphylum: Chelicerata
- Class: Arachnida
- Order: Araneae
- Infraorder: Araneomorphae
- Family: Agelenidae
- Genus: Tegenaria
- Species: T. pagana

Binomial name
- Tegenaria pagana C. L. Koch, 1840

Synonyms
- Tegenaria longipalpis Lucas, 1846; Tegenaria subtilis Simon, 1870; Tegenaria testacea Simon, 1870; Tegenaria proxima O. Pickard-Cambridge, 1873; Tegenaria urbana Simon, 1875; Tegenaria variata Thorell, 1875; Tegenaria bidentata Keyserling, 1878; Tegenaria obscura Banks, 1898; Tegenaria pagana cavernicola Simon, 1907; Tegenaria antrias Crosby, 1926; Tegenaria simplex Bryant, 1936; Tegenaria castro Chamberlin & Ivie, 1942; Philoicides pallidus Mello-Leitão, 1944; Tegenaria cerrutii Roewer, 1960; Tegenaria marinae Brignoli, 1971; Tegenaria baronii Brignoli, 1977

= Tegenaria pagana =

House funnel-web spider

Species of funnel-web spider

Tegenaria pagana is a species of funnel-web spider in the family Agelenidae. It is known as the house funnel-web spider and has a cosmopolitan distribution, being native to Europe and North Africa to Central Asia and introduced to numerous countries worldwide including the United States, Mexico, Brazil, Chile, Saint Helena, and South Africa.

== Etymology ==
The specific name "pagana" is derived from Latin, meaning "of the countryside" or "rustic".

== Taxonomy ==
The species was first described by Carl Ludwig Koch in 1840 from specimens collected in Greece.

Tegenaria pagana has an extensive synonymy, with numerous species later determined to be the same taxon. A major taxonomic revision by Bolzern, Burckhardt & Hänggi (2013) synonymized many previously recognized species and subspecies with T. pagana, including T. cerrutii, T. marinae, T. baronii, and the subspecies T. pagana urbana.

== Distribution ==
Tegenaria pagana has a wide natural distribution across the Palearctic, extending from Europe through North Africa to Central Asia. The species has been widely introduced to other regions through human activities and is now established on multiple continents. In North America, it is found in the United States and Mexico, while in South America it occurs in Brazil and Chile.

In South Africa, where it is introduced, the species is currently known only from the Western Cape province, having been recorded from Cape Town, Oudtshoorn, Worcester, and the Kirstenbosch National Botanical Garden.

== Habitat ==
Tegenaria pagana is a synanthropic species, commonly associated with human habitations and urban environments. The spiders typically construct their webs in and around houses, often building between rubble around buildings in built-up areas.

== Description ==
The original description by Koch noted that females are larger than males, with females measuring 4.0–4.5 mm in body length and males 3.5–3.75 mm.

Female T. pagana have a pale yellowish cephalothorax with a reddish head region marked by two longitudinal stripes and a marginal stripe that are brown in coloration. The opisthosoma is yellowish-white with rows of spots and transverse rows of smaller dash-like markings on the sides that appear black. The spinnerets are long, with a black ring on the penultimate segment.

Males are similar in general appearance to females but have proportionally longer legs.

The species can be distinguished from the closely related Tegenaria domestica by several morphological features, particularly the structure of the spinnerets. In T. pagana, the spinnerets are nearly twice as long as those of T. domestica, being entirely white with a black ring at the end of the second segment of the upper two spinnerets. The terminal segment of the spinnerets is noticeably shorter than in T. domestica and somewhat concealed.

== Conservation status ==
In South Africa, where the species is introduced, Tegenaria pagana is classified as Least Concern due to its wide global distribution, despite its limited local range in the country. The species is protected within the Kirstenbosch National Botanical Garden.
