= Euhadenoecus =

Scientific classification
- Domain: Eukaryota
- Kingdom: Animalia
- Phylum: Arthropoda
- Class: Insecta
- Order: Orthoptera
- Suborder: Ensifera
- Family: Rhaphidophoridae
- Tribe: Hadenoecini
- Genus: Euhadenoecus; Hubbell, 1978

Genus of cricket-like animals

Euhadenoecus is a genus of camel crickets in the family Rhaphidophoridae. There are at least four described species in Euhadenoecus.

== Species ==
- Euhadenoecus adelphus Hubbell & Norton, 1978 (adelphos camel cricket)
- Euhadenoecus fragilis Hubbell & Norton, 1978 (tawneys cave cricket)
- Euhadenoecus insolitus Hubbell & Norton, 1978 (McCluney cave cricket)
- Euhadenoecus puteanus (Scudder, 1877) (puteanus camel cricket)
