= Tegenaria pontica =

Scientific classification
- Kingdom: Animalia
- Phylum: Arthropoda
- Subphylum: Chelicerata
- Class: Arachnida
- Order: Araneae
- Infraorder: Araneomorphae
- Family: Agelenidae
- Genus: Tegenaria
- Species: T. pontica

Binomial name
- Tegenaria pontica Charitonov, 1947

Species of spider

Tegenaria pontica is a spider species found in Georgia.
