= Tegenaria annulata =

Scientific classification
- Kingdom: Animalia
- Phylum: Arthropoda
- Subphylum: Chelicerata
- Class: Arachnida
- Order: Araneae
- Infraorder: Araneomorphae
- Family: Agelenidae
- Genus: Tegenaria
- Species: T. annulata

Binomial name
- Tegenaria annulata Kulczynski, 1913

Species of spider

Tegenaria annulata is a species of funnel-web spiders found in Bosnia-Herzegovina, Croatia, and Montenegro.
