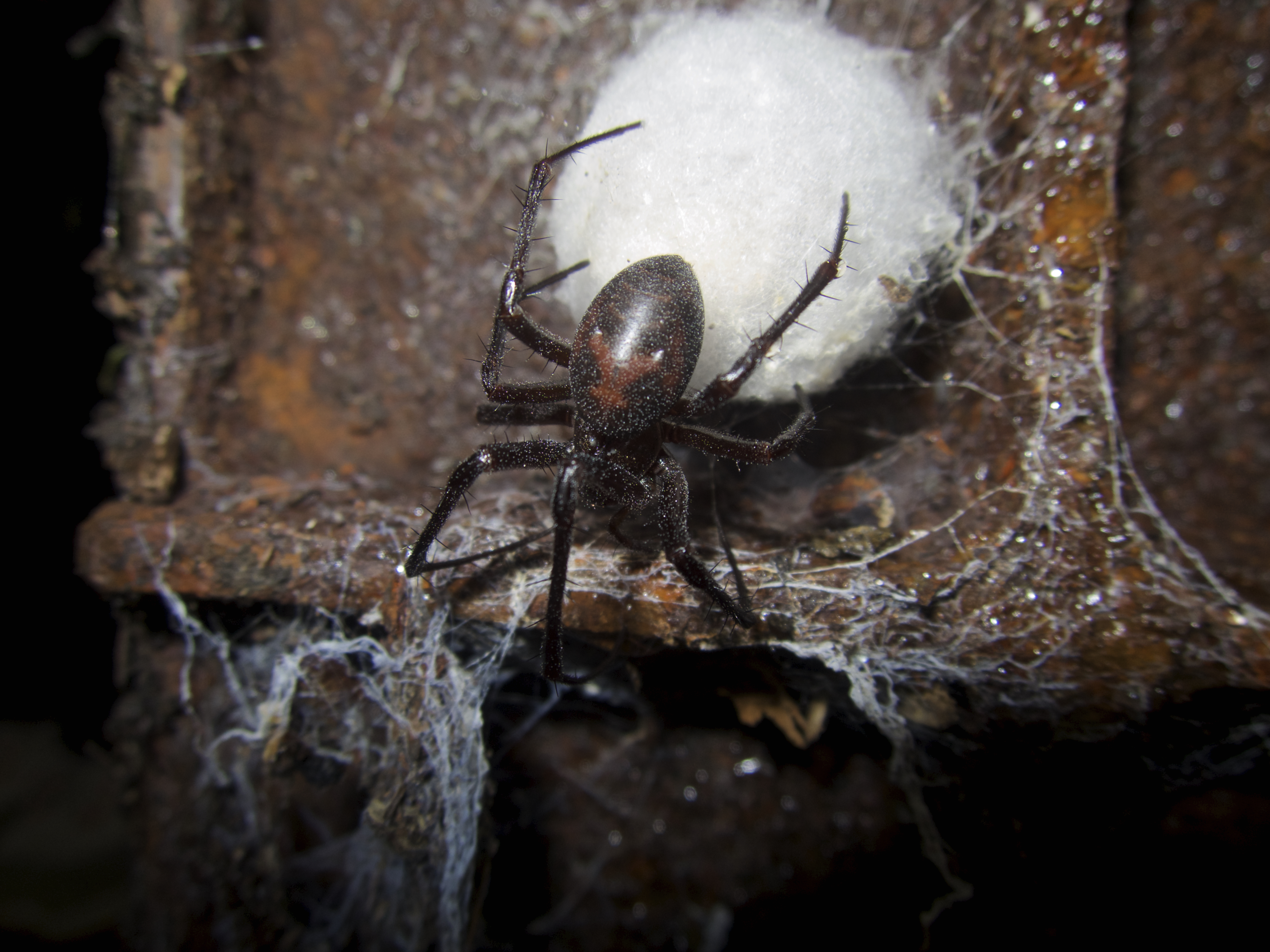
- Female Meta bourneti on its egg sac

Scientific classification
- Kingdom: Animalia
- Phylum: Arthropoda
- Subphylum: Chelicerata
- Class: Arachnida
- Order: Araneae
- Infraorder: Araneomorphae
- Family: Tetragnathidae
- Genus: Meta
- Species: M. bourneti

Binomial name
- Meta bourneti Simon, 1922

Synonyms
- Meta milleri Kratochvíl, 1942

= Meta bourneti =

Species of spider

Meta bourneti is an orb weaving cave spider closely related to Meta menardi.

== Morphology ==
Big sized spider (body length male: 10–13 mm; female: 13–16 mm), very similar in the external morphology to the congeneric Meta menardi. The prosoma is red-brown, with darker margin. Legs are red-brown. The opisthosoma is yellowish, laterally often completely black.

== Ecology ==
Usually found in caves, in the twilight-zone. The species show a preference for cave walls and roofs, where it spin its orb-web. M. bourneti is able to consume a wide variety of prey items, including dipterans, moths, centipedes, woodlouse, and other cave-dwelling spiders.

== Phenology ==
Female and juveniles are observed all year round. Males are rare, and usually found from August to December.

The eggsac (cocoon) is white, drop-shaped, and very similar to that of M. menardi (see). It is usually laid in the proximity of the cave entrance between October and November. The spiderlings hatch from the cocoon between January and February.

== Distribution ==
It is found from Europe to Georgia and North Africa.
