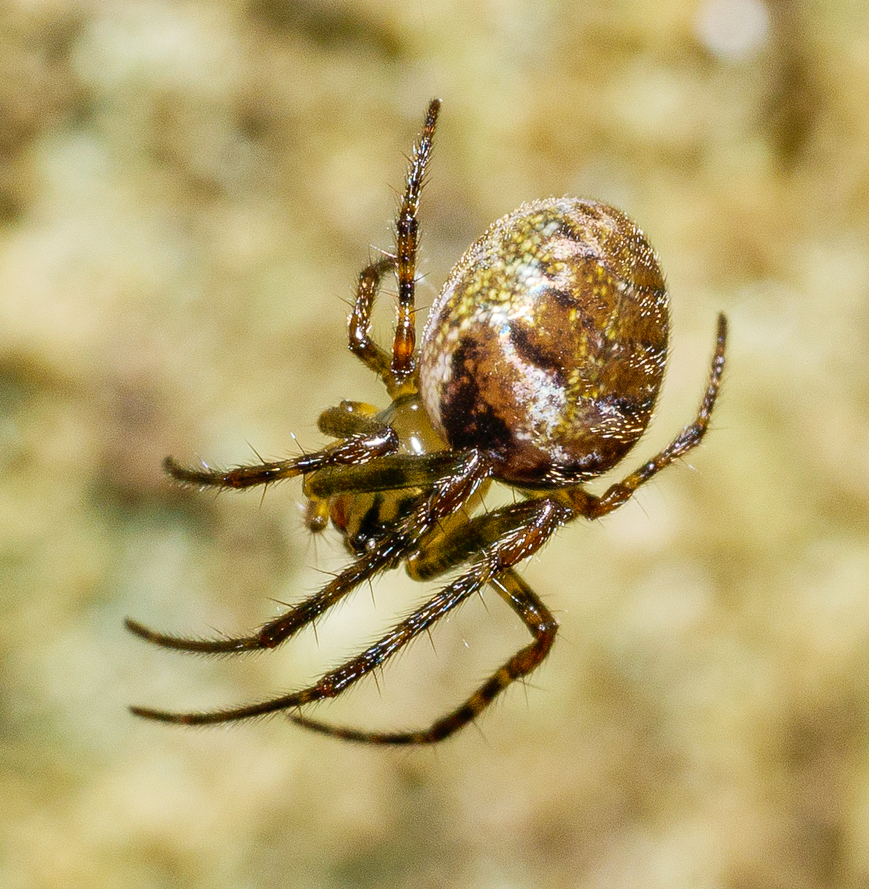

Conservation status
- Not Threatened (NZ TCS)

Scientific classification
- Domain: Eukaryota
- Kingdom: Animalia
- Phylum: Arthropoda
- Subphylum: Chelicerata
- Class: Arachnida
- Order: Araneae
- Infraorder: Araneomorphae
- Family: Tetragnathidae
- Genus: Taraire
- Species: T. rufolineata

Binomial name
- Taraire rufolineata (Urquhart, 1889)

Synonyms
- Linyphia rufo-lineata; Landana lautiuscula; Meta rufolineata

= Taraire rufolineata =

Species of Arachnida

Taraire rufolineata is a species of Tetragnathidae spider that is endemic to New Zealand.

== Taxonomy ==
This species was described as Linyphia rufo-lineata in 1889 by Arthur Urquhart from male and female specimens collected from the summit of Te Aroha. It was most recently revised in 2020, in which it was transferred to the Taraire genus. The syntype is stored in Canterbury Museum.

== Description ==
The female is recorded at 6.6mm in length whereas the male is 8.2mm.

== Distribution ==
This species is known from scattered localities in New Zealand.

== Conservation status ==
Under the New Zealand Threat Classification System, this species is listed as "Not Threatened".
