= Taraire oculta =

Conservation status
- Not Threatened (NZ TCS)

Scientific classification
- Domain: Eukaryota
- Kingdom: Animalia
- Phylum: Arthropoda
- Subphylum: Chelicerata
- Class: Arachnida
- Order: Araneae
- Infraorder: Araneomorphae
- Family: Tetragnathidae
- Genus: Taraire
- Species: T. oculta

Binomial name
- Taraire oculta Álvarez-Padilla, Kallal & Hormiga, 2020

Species of Arachnida

Taraire oculta is a species of Tetragnathidae spider that is endemic to New Zealand.

== Taxonomy ==
This species was described in 2020 by Fernando Álvarez-Padilla, Robert Kallal and Gustavo Hormiga. The holotype is stored in Te Papa Museum.

== Description ==
The female is recorded at 7.6mm in length whereas the male is 5.7mm.

== Distribution ==
This species is only known from the South Island of New Zealand.

== Conservation status ==
Under the New Zealand Threat Classification System, this species is listed as "Not Threatened".
