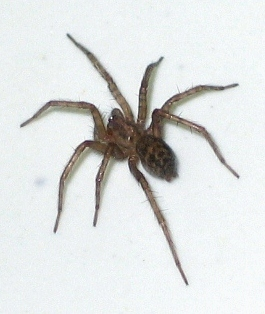
- A female Tegenaria domestica
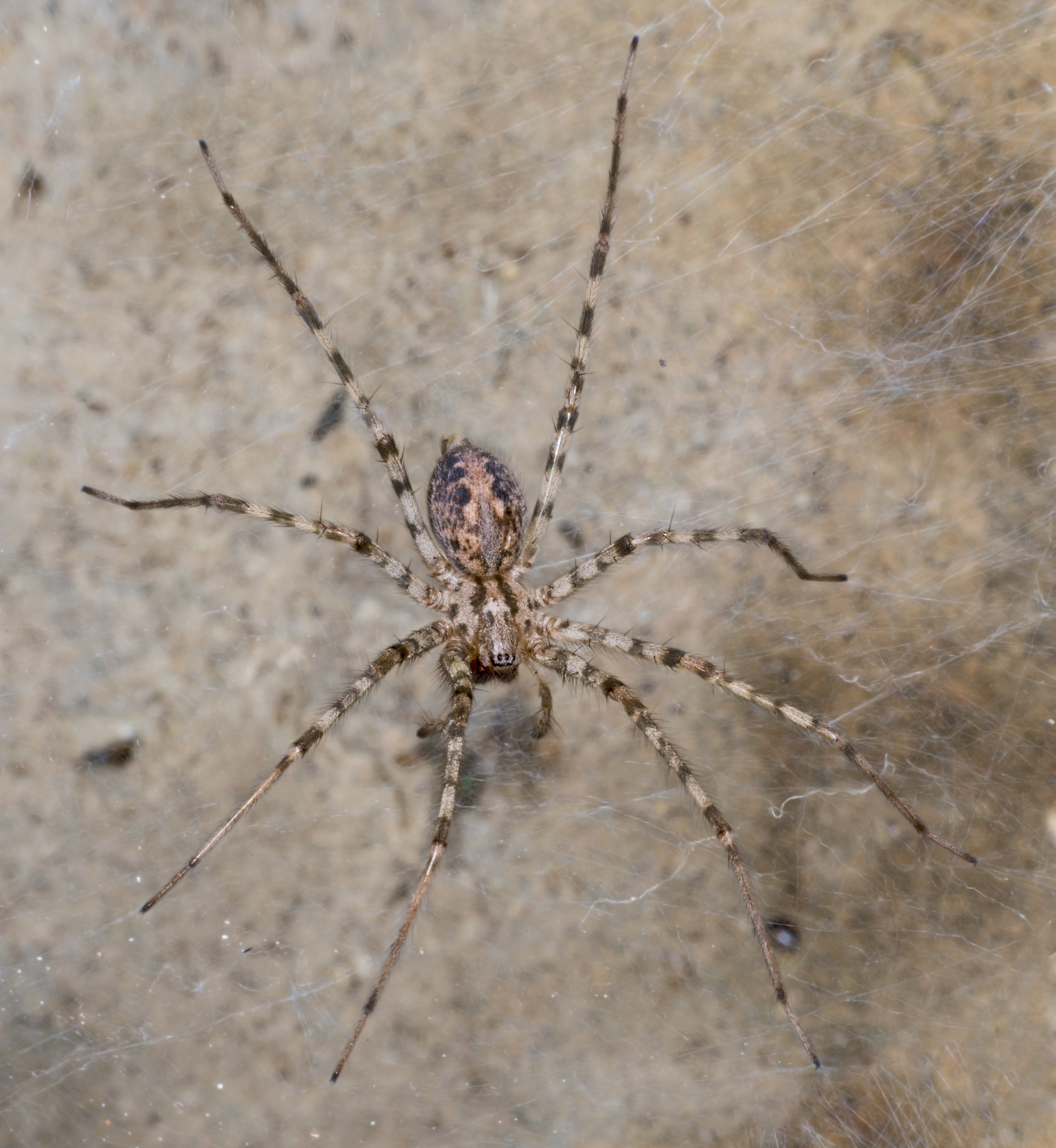
- T. parietina

Scientific classification
- Kingdom: Animalia
- Phylum: Arthropoda
- Subphylum: Chelicerata
- Class: Arachnida
- Order: Araneae
- Infraorder: Araneomorphae
- Family: Agelenidae
- Genus: Tegenaria; Latreille, 1804

Type species
- T. domestica (Clerck, 1757)

Species
- 139, see text

Synonyms
- Aranea Linnaeus, 1758 (Suppressed); Trichopus Templeton, 1834; Philoica Koch, 1837; Drassina Grube, 1862; Mevianops Mello-Leitão, 1941; Philoicides Mello-Leitão, 1944; Iamatega Kishida, 1955; Sabitega Kishida, 1955

= Tegenaria =

Tegenaria Temporal range: Palaeogene–present

Genus of spiders

Tegenaria is a genus of fast-running funnel weavers that occupies much of the Northern Hemisphere except for Japan and Indonesia. It was first described by Pierre André Latreille in 1804, though many of its species have been moved elsewhere. The majority of these were moved to Eratigena, including the giant house spider (Eratigena atrica) and the hobo spider (Eratigena agrestis).

== Life style ==
They construct a typical non-sticky funnel web with flat open sheet like area, usually in dark corners, commonly in outbuildings.

Mating takes place during the summer months.

== Identification ==
Tegenaria can be difficult to identify because they resemble wolf spiders and other funnel-web spiders in their area, unless found in an area where they do not occur naturally. They live on sheet webs, usually stretching across the corner between two walls. They have eight eyes in two straight or almost straight rows. Size varies from one species to another, but the body length of adults can range from 10 millimetres (0.39 in) to 20 millimetres (0.79 in), not including the legs. The cardinal spider is the largest funnel weaver, with females that can grow up to 18 millimetres (0.71 in) long.

With access to a microscope, Tegenaria can be distinguished from other members of Agelenidae (particularly Eratigena) by its 3 to 7 large teeth present in its cheliceral retromargin (Eratigena has 6 or more teeth, and distal teeth smaller than proximal teeth). Additionally, Tegenaria epigyna will be broader than long, whereas Eratigena epigyna will be as long as — or longer than — they are wide.

== Species ==
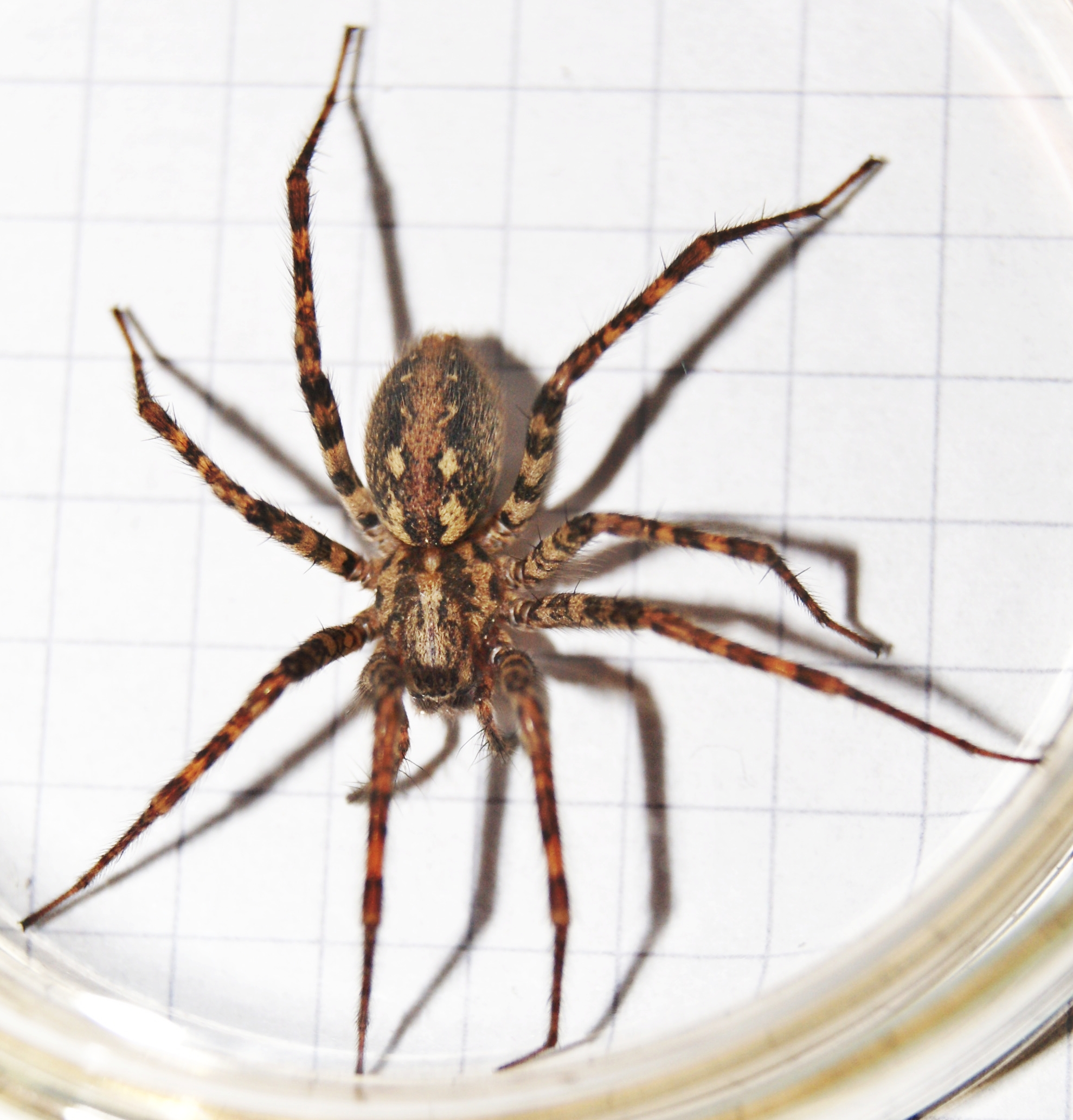
T. ferruginea

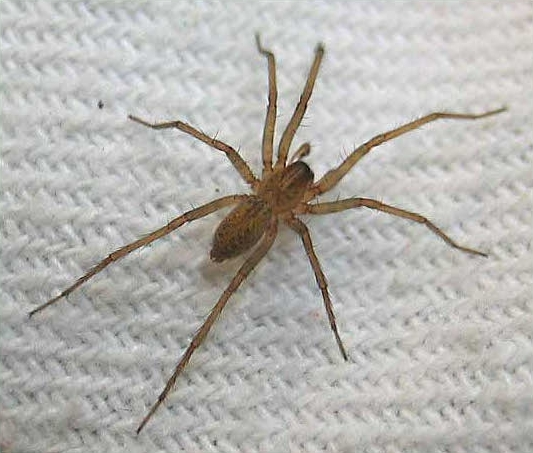
T. silvestris

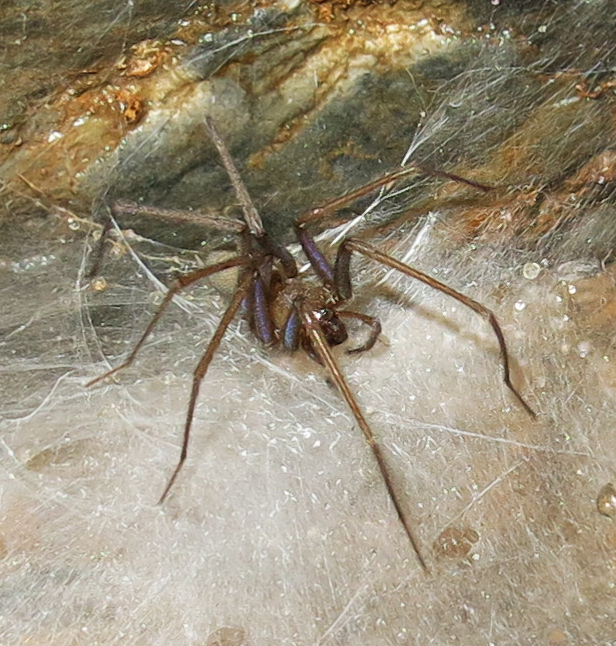
T. zamanii

As of October 2026, this genus includes 139 species:

- T. abchasica Charitonov, 1941 – Caucasus (Russia, Georgia)
- T. achaea Brignoli, 1977 – Greece, Turkey
- T. adomestica Guseinov, Marusik & Koponen, 2005 – Azerbaijan
- T. agnolettii Brignoli, 1978 – Turkey
- T. alamto Zamani, Marusik & Malek-Hosseini, 2018 – Iran
- T. amirani Seropian, Bulbulashvili & Makharadze, 2025 – Georgia
- T. angustipalpis Levy, 1996 – Greece, Israel
- T. anhela Brignoli, 1972 – Turkey
- T. annae Bolzern, Burckhardt & Hänggi, 2013 – Greece
- T. annulata Kulczyński, 1913 – Croatia, Bosnia and Herzegovina, Montenegro
- T. argaeica Nosek, 1905 – Bulgaria, Turkey
- T. ariadnae Brignoli, 1984 – Greece (Crete)
- T. armigera Simon, 1873 – France (Corsica), Italy (Sardinia)
- T. arsacia Zamani & Marusik, 2019 – Iran
- T. averni Brignoli, 1978 – Turkey
- T. azilaneensis Lecigne, 2025 – Morocco
- T. ballarini Zamani, Kaya & Marusik, 2024 – Turkey
- T. bayeri Kratochvíl, 1934 – Bosnia and Herzegovina, Montenegro
- T. bayrami Kaya, Kunt, Marusik & Uğurtaş, 2010 – Turkey
- T. beyazcika Zamani, Kaya & Marusik, 2024 – Turkey
- T. boitanii Brignoli, 1978 – Turkey
- T. bosnica Kratochvíl & Miller, 1940 – Croatia, Bosnia and Herzegovina, Montenegro, Albania, North Macedonia
- T. bozhkovi (Deltshev, 2008) – Bulgaria, Greece
- T. brinikhi Ponomarev, Mikhailov & Shmatko, 2024 – Russia (Caucasus)
- T. campestris (C. L. Koch, 1834) – France, Azerbaijan, Algeria
- T. capolongoi Brignoli, 1977 – Italy
- T. carensis Barrientos, 1981 – Spain
- T. chebana Thorell, 1897 – Myanmar
- T. chiricahuae Roth, 1968 – United States
- T. chumachenkoi Kovblyuk & Ponomarev, 2008 – Russia (Europe, Caucasus), Georgia, Azerbaijan, Turkey
- T. circeoensis Bolzern, Burckhardt & Hänggi, 2013 – Italy
- T. comnena Brignoli, 1978 – Turkey
- T. comstocki Gajbe, 2004 – India
- T. concolor Simon, 1873 – Syria
- T. cottarellii Brignoli, 1978 – Turkey
- T. croatica Bolzern, Burckhardt & Hänggi, 2013 – Croatia
- T. dagestana Ponomarev, Mikhailov & Shmatko, 2024 – Russia (Caucasus)
- T. daiamsanesis Kim, 1998 – Korea
- T. dalmatica Kulczyński, 1906 – Mediterranean, Ukraine
- T. daylamanica Zamani & Marusik, 2019 – Iran
- T. decolorata Kratochvíl & Miller, 1940 – Croatia
- T. dentifera Kulczyński, 1908 – Cyprus
- T. domestica (Clerck, 1757) – Europe, North Africa, Turkey, Caucasus, Middle East, Russia (Europe to Far East), Kazakhstan, Central Asia, India, Mongolia, China, Korea, Japan. Introduced to Australia, New Zealand, the Americas, South Africa, St. Helena, Réunion (type species)
- T. egrisiana Zamani, Kaya & Marusik, 2024 – Georgia
- T. eleonorae Brignoli, 1974 – Italy
- T. elysii Brignoli, 1978 – Turkey
- T. epacris Levy, 1996 – Israel
- T. eros Zamani & Marusik, 2019 – Iran
- T. euxinica Dimitrov, 2022 – Bulgaria, Turkey
- T. faniapollinis Brignoli, 1978 – Italy (Sicily), North Macedonia, Bulgaria, Greece, Turkey
- T. femoralis Simon, 1873 – France, Italy
- T. ferruginea (Panzer, 1804) – Europe. Introduced to Azores, Venezuela
- T. forestieroi Brignoli, 1978 – Turkey
- T. frumkini Aharon & Gavish-Regev, 2023 – Israel
- T. gainesteros Aharon & Gavish-Regev, 2023 – Israel
- T. gordani Komnenov, 2020 – Montenegro
- T. guseinovi Zamani & Marusik, 2019 – Iran
- T. halidi Guseinov, Marusik & Koponen, 2005 – Azerbaijan, Iran
- T. hamid Brignoli, 1978 – Turkey
- T. hasperi Chyzer, 1897 – France, Turkey, Russia (Europe, Caucasus), Georgia. Introduced to Britain
- T. hauseri Brignoli, 1979 – Greece
- T. hemanginiae Reddy & Patel, 1992 – India
- T. henroti Dresco, 1956 – Italy (Sardinia)
- T. hoeferi Zamani, Kaya & Marusik, 2024 – Armenia
- T. ismaillensis Guseinov, Marusik & Koponen, 2005 – Azerbaijan
- T. karaman Brignoli, 1978 – Turkey
- T. komarovi Ponomarev, 2022 – Caucasus (Russia, Georgia)
- T. lapicidinarum Spassky, 1934 – Ukraine, Russia (Europe, Urals)
- T. latens Ponomarev, 2022 – Russia (Caucasus)
- T. lehtineni (Guseinov, Marusik & Koponen, 2005) – Azerbaijan
- T. lenkoranica (Guseinov, Marusik & Koponen, 2005) – Azerbaijan, Iran
- T. lepida Ponomarev, 2022 – Russia (Caucasus)
- T. levantina Barrientos, 1981 – Spain
- T. longimana Simon, 1898 – Turkey, Caucasus (Russia, Georgia)
- T. lunakensis Tikader, 1964 – Nepal
- T. lyncea Brignoli, 1978 – Turkey, Caucasus (Russia, Georgia, Azerbaijan)
- T. maelfaiti Bosmans, 2011 – Greece
- T. mamikonian Brignoli, 1978 – Turkey
- T. maroccana Denis, 1956 – Morocco
- T. maronita Simon, 1873 – Turkey, Syria, Lebanon, Israel
- T. mediterranea Levy, 1996 – Israel
- T. melbae Brignoli, 1972 – Turkey
- T. mercanturensis Bolzern & Hervé, 2010 – France
- T. michae Brignoli, 1978 – Lebanon
- T. mirifica Thaler, 1987 – Switzerland, Austria, Italy
- T. montana Deltshev, 1993 – Bulgaria
- T. montiszasensis Bolzern, Burckhardt & Hänggi, 2013 – Greece
- T. naasane Aharon & Gavish-Regev, 2023 – Israel
- T. nakhchivanica (Guseinov, Marusik & Koponen, 2005) – Azerbaijan
- T. occulta Ponomarev, 2022 – Russia (Caucasus)
- T. oribata Simon, 1916 – France (Pyrenees)
- T. ornit Aharon & Gavish-Regev, 2023 – Israel
- T. osetica Ponomarev, 2022 – Russia (Caucasus)
- T. pagana C. L. Koch, 1840 – Europe and North Africa, Central Asia. Introduced to United States, Mexico, Brazil, Chile, St. Helena, South Africa
- T. pallens Zamani & Marusik, 2023 – Iran
- T. parietina (Fourcroy, 1785) – Europe, North Africa, Israel, Central Asia. Introduced to Jamaica, Paraguay, South Africa, Sri Lanka, Azores
- T. parmenidis Brignoli, 1971 – Italy
- T. parvula Thorell, 1875 – Italy, Slovenia, Romania
- T. pasquinii Brignoli, 1978 – Turkey
- T. percuriosa Brignoli, 1972 – Turkey
- T. pieperi Brignoli, 1979 – Greece (Crete)
- T. pindosiensis Bolzern, Burckhardt & Hänggi, 2013 – Greece
- T. podoprygorai (Kovblyuk, 2006) – Ukraine
- T. pontica Charitonov, 1947 – Russia (Caucasus), Georgia?
- T. prisnyi Ponomarev, 2021 – Russia (Caucasus)
- T. pseudolyncea (Guseinov, Marusik & Koponen, 2005) – Turkey, Georgia, Azerbaijan
- T. racovitzai Simon, 1907 – Spain, France
- T. rahnamayi Zamani & Marusik, 2019 – Iran
- T. ramblae Barrientos, 1978 – Portugal, Spain
- T. regispyrrhi Brignoli, 1976 – North Macedonia, Bulgaria, Greece
- T. rhodiensis Caporiacco, 1948 – Greece (Rhodes), Turkey
- T. rilaensis Deltshev, 1993 – North Macedonia, Bulgaria
- T. sbordonii Brignoli, 1971 – Italy
- T. schmalfussi Brignoli, 1976 – Greece (Crete)
- T. schoenhoferi Bolzern, Burckhardt & Hänggi, 2013 – Greece
- T. scopifera Barrientos, Ribera & Pons, 2002 – Spain (Balearic Is.)
- T. shillongensis Barman, 1979 – India
- T. shirin Zamani & Marusik, 2019 – Iran
- T. silvestris L. Koch, 1872 – Europe
- T. sorani Zamani & Marusik, 2024 – Iraq
- T. talyshica Guseinov, Marusik & Koponen, 2005 – Azerbaijan
- T. taurica Charitonov, 1947 – Ukraine, Georgia?
- T. tekke Brignoli, 1978 – Turkey
- T. terskovi Ponomarev, 2023 – Russia (Caucasus)
- T. tetrica Ponomarev, Mikhailov & Shmatko, 2024 – Russia (Caucasus)
- T. tridentina L. Koch, 1872 – Europe
- T. trogalil Aharon & Gavish-Regev, 2023 – Israel
- T. tsekhok Ponomarev, Mikhailov & Shmatko, 2024 – Russia (Caucasus)
- T. tyrrhenica Dalmas, 1922 – Italy
- T. utrish Ponomarev, Mikhailov & Shmatko, 2024 – Russia (Caucasus)
- T. vallei Brignoli, 1972 – Libya
- T. vanensis Danişman & Karanfil, 2015 – Turkey
- T. vankeerorum Bolzern, Burckhardt & Hänggi, 2013 – Greece (Rhodes), Turkey
- T. vignai Brignoli, 1978 – Turkey
- T. wittmeri Brignoli, 1978 – Bhutan
- T. yaaranford Aharon & Gavish-Regev, 2023 – Israel
- T. yotami Aharon & Gavish-Regev, 2023 – Israel
- T. zagatalensis Guseinov, Marusik & Koponen, 2005 – Azerbaijan
- T. zamanii Marusik & Omelko, 2014 – Iran
