= Tegenaria comstocki =

Scientific classification
- Kingdom: Animalia
- Phylum: Arthropoda
- Subphylum: Chelicerata
- Class: Arachnida
- Order: Araneae
- Infraorder: Araneomorphae
- Family: Agelenidae
- Genus: Tegenaria
- Species: T. comstocki

Binomial name
- Tegenaria comstocki Pawan Gajbe, 2004

Species of spider

Tegenaria comstocki is a species of funnel weaver in the family Agelenidae. It is first published in " (2004). Spiders of Jabalpur, Madhya Pradesh (Arachnida: Araneae). Rec. zool. Surv. India, Occas. Pap. "
