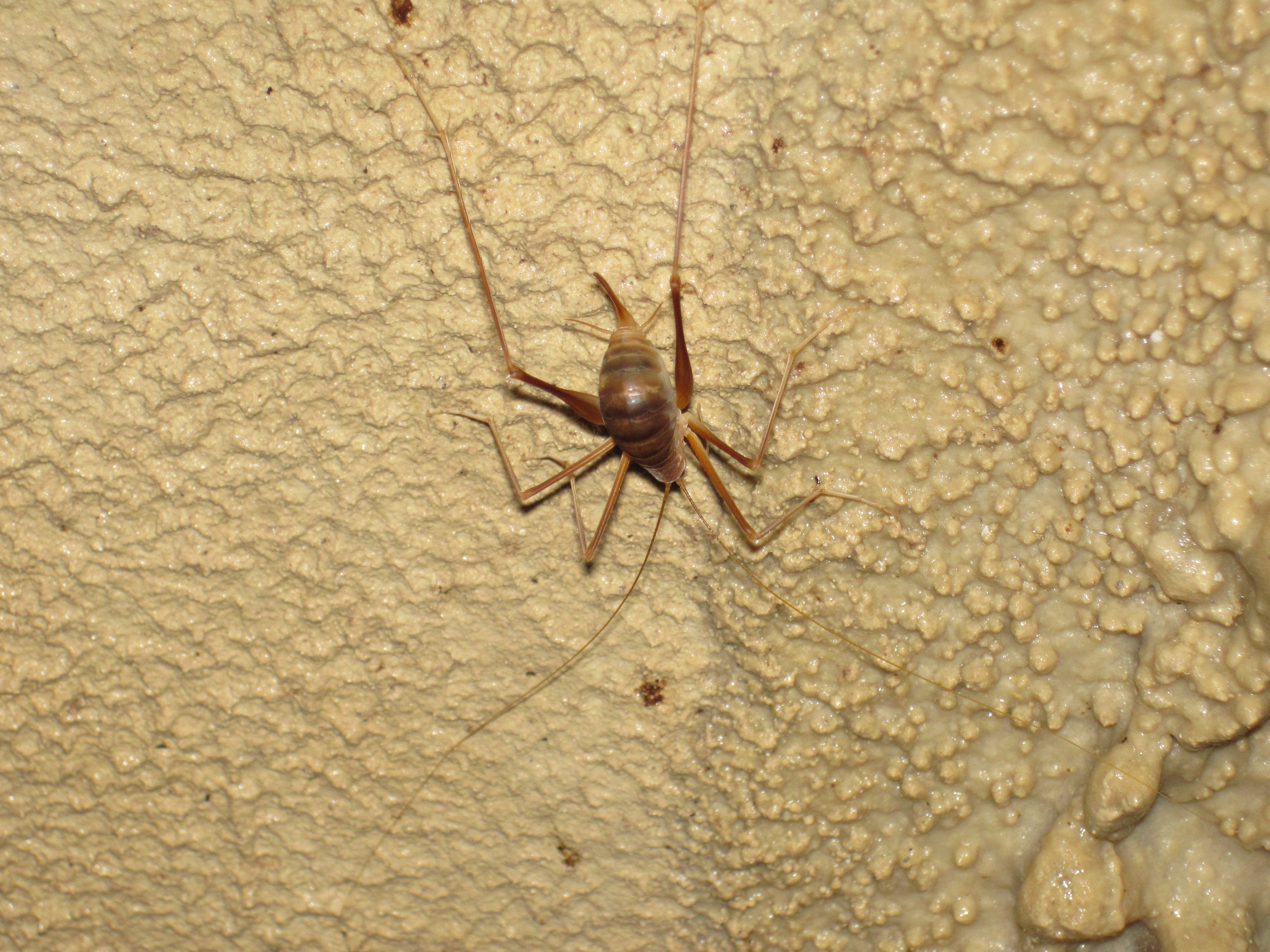
- Hadenoecus subterraneus, Mammoth Cave National Park

Scientific classification
- Domain: Eukaryota
- Kingdom: Animalia
- Phylum: Arthropoda
- Class: Insecta
- Order: Orthoptera
- Suborder: Ensifera
- Family: Rhaphidophoridae
- Subfamily: Ceuthophilinae
- Tribe: Hadenoecini
- Genus: Hadenoecus; Scudder, 1863

= Hadenoecus =

Genus of cricket-like animals

Hadenoecus is a genus of common cave cricket of the southeastern United States and typical of the tribe Hadenoecini.

An interesting characteristic of these crickets is their long antennae and powerful rear legs which allow for quick movement in the dark cave system. When threatened, H. subterraneus will jump and turn up to 180 degrees before landing again and jumping in another direction. This is suspected to be an adaptation to escape predators.

Much research has been conducted on the ecosystems of which the cave cricket is a part. The Mammoth Cave system in central Kentucky is populated by the species Hadenoecus subterraneus.

== Species ==
These five species belong to the genus Hadenoecus:

- Hadenoecus barri Hubbell & Norton, 1978^{i c g b} (Barr's cave cricket)
- Hadenoecus cumberlandicus Hubbell & Norton, 1978^{i c g b} (Cumberland cave cricket)
- Hadenoecus jonesi Hubbell & Norton, 1978^{i c g b} (limrock blowing cave cricket)
- Hadenoecus opilionides Hubbell & Norton, 1978^{i c g b} (Tennessee cave cricket)
- Hadenoecus subterraneus (Scudder, 1861)^{i c g b} (common cave cricket)

Data sources: i = ITIS, c = Catalogue of Life, g = GBIF, b = Bugguide.net
