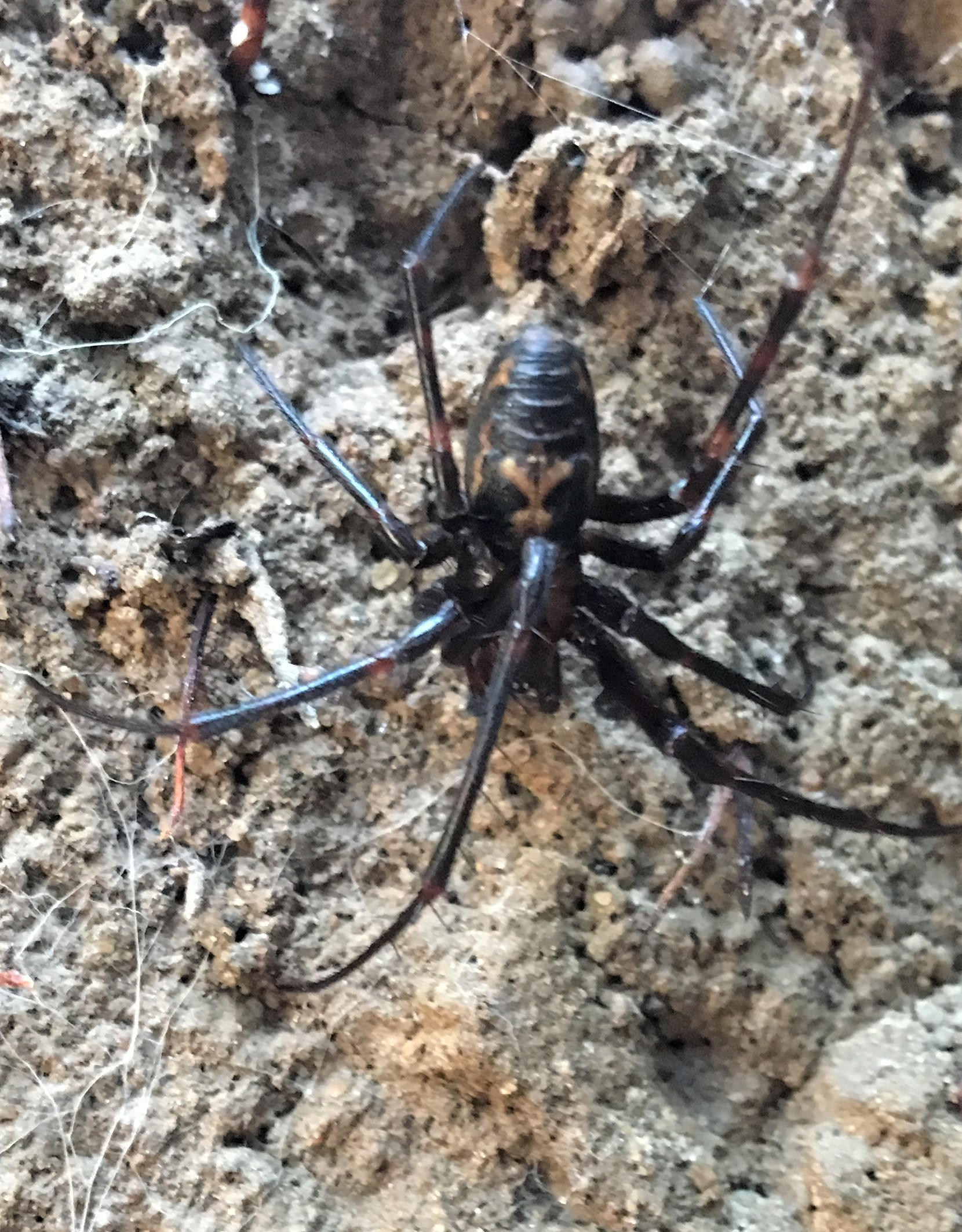
- Dolloff cave spider found in Empire Cave in Santa Cruz, California

Conservation status
- Vulnerable (IUCN 2.3)

- Vulnerable (NatureServe)

Scientific classification
- Kingdom: Animalia
- Phylum: Arthropoda
- Subphylum: Chelicerata
- Class: Arachnida
- Order: Araneae
- Infraorder: Araneomorphae
- Family: Tetragnathidae
- Genus: Meta
- Species: M. dolloff

Binomial name
- Meta dolloff Levi & Levi, 1980
- Meta dolloff natural range, estimated with the iNaturalist GeoModel

= Dolloff cave spider =

Species of spider

The Dolloff cave spider (Meta dolloff) is a spider native to California, among the rarest spiders of North America.

This species was listed as vulnerable in 1996 on the IUCN Red List of Threatened Animals.

== Habitat ==
The Dolloff cave spider has been found in caves in the Empire Cave System near University of California, Santa Cruz, and in the Gray Whale Ranch State Park.

Since the discovery of Meta dolloff in the Empire and Dolloff Caves, Santa Cruz, California, M. dolloff have been found to regularly exist and reproduce outside of caves in other subterranean habitats such as railroad tunnels and human-dug soil pits at UC Santa Cruz. The Dolloff cave spider builds its webs near niches and depressions in cave walls, feeding primarily on moths and harvestmen.
