= Tegenaria percuriosa =

Scientific classification
- Kingdom: Animalia
- Phylum: Arthropoda
- Subphylum: Chelicerata
- Class: Arachnida
- Order: Araneae
- Infraorder: Araneomorphae
- Family: Agelenidae
- Genus: Tegenaria
- Species: T. percuriosa

Binomial name
- Tegenaria percuriosa Brignoli, 1972

Species of spider

Tegenaria percuriosa is a funnel-web spider found in Turkey.
