= Tegenaria mirifica =

Scientific classification
- Kingdom: Animalia
- Phylum: Arthropoda
- Subphylum: Chelicerata
- Class: Arachnida
- Order: Araneae
- Infraorder: Araneomorphae
- Family: Agelenidae
- Genus: Tegenaria
- Species: T. mirifica

Binomial name
- Tegenaria mirifica Thaler, 1987

Species of spider

Tegenaria mirifica is a funnel-web spider species found in Switzerland, Austria and Italy.
