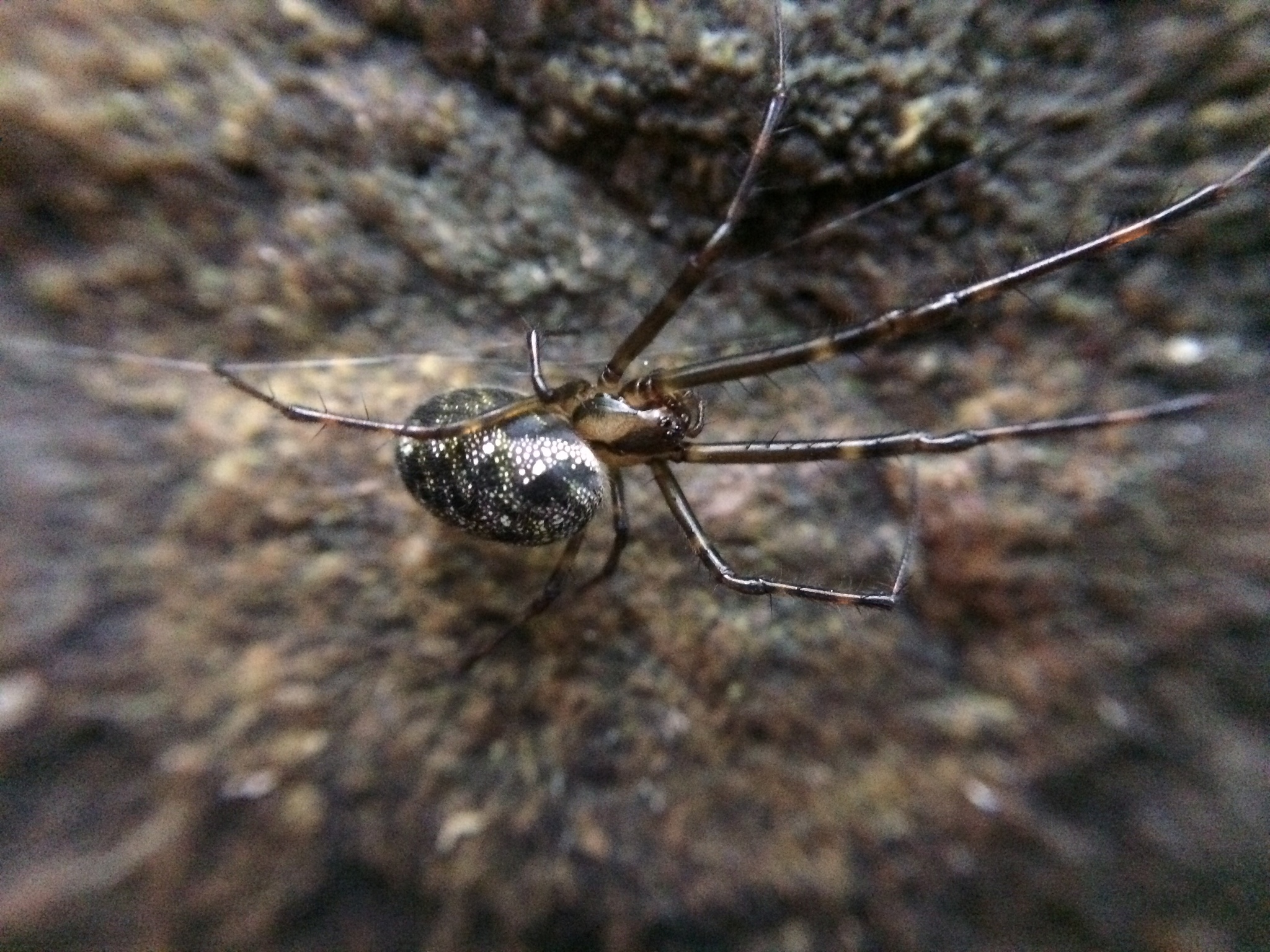

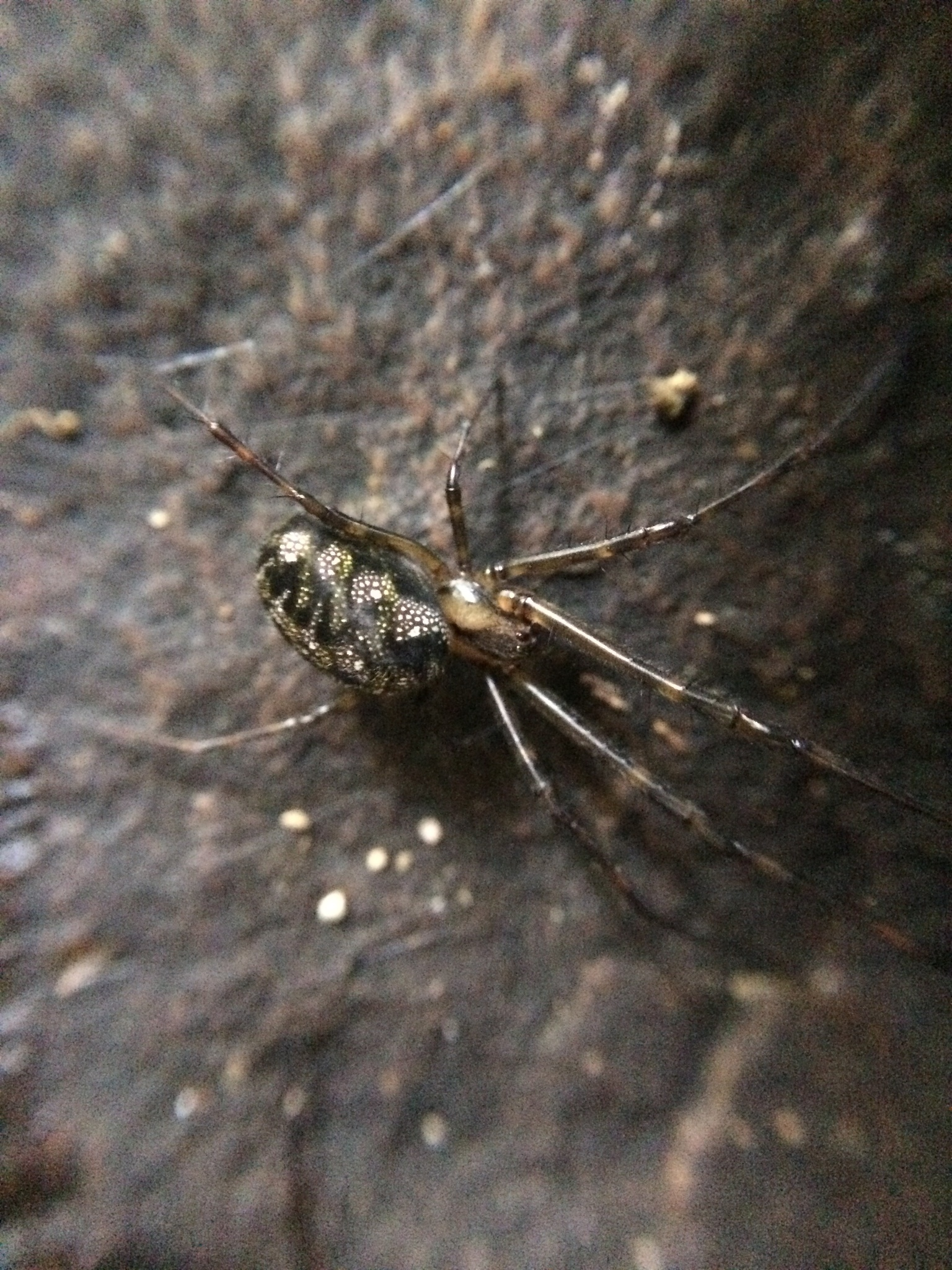

Scientific classification
- Kingdom: Animalia
- Phylum: Arthropoda
- Subphylum: Chelicerata
- Class: Arachnida
- Order: Araneae
- Infraorder: Araneomorphae
- Family: Tetragnathidae
- Genus: Meta
- Species: M. meruensis

Binomial name
- Meta meruensis Tullgren, 1910

Synonyms
- Meta pumila Thorell, 1877; Argyroepeira pumila Thorell, 1890; Mesida pumila Chrysanthus, 1975

= Meta meruensis =

Meruensis Orb-Web Spider

Species of spider

Meta meruensis is a species of spider in the family Tetragnathidae. It is commonly known as the meruensis orb-web spider.

== Distribution ==
Meta meruensis is found in Tanzania and South Africa. In South Africa, the species is recorded from three provinces: KwaZulu-Natal, Limpopo, and Mpumalanga.

== Habitat and ecology ==
The species has been collected from low vegetation near water in Forest and Savanna biomes at altitudes ranging from 687 to 2,785 m.

== Conservation ==
Meta meruensis is listed as Least Concern by the South African National Biodiversity Institute due to its wide geographical range. The species is protected in Blouberg Nature Reserve, Lekgalameetse Nature Reserve, and Lhuvhondo Nature Reserve.

== Taxonomy ==
The species was originally described by Albert Tullgren in 1910 from Tanzania. According to Marusik and Larsen in 2018, the species is misplaced in Meta and based on the shape of the epigyne, it may belong to Leucauge. However, it differs from Leucauge in several aspects, including the absence of the double fringe of trichobothria on leg IV.

It is known only from females.
