= Tegenaria bosnica =

Scientific classification
- Kingdom: Animalia
- Phylum: Arthropoda
- Subphylum: Chelicerata
- Class: Arachnida
- Order: Araneae
- Infraorder: Araneomorphae
- Family: Agelenidae
- Genus: Tegenaria
- Species: T. bosnica

Binomial name
- Tegenaria bosnica Kratochvil & Miller, 1940

Species of spider

Tegenaria bosnica is a species of funnel-web spiders found in Bosnia-Herzegovina, Croatia, Montenegro and Serbia.
