= Tegenaria regispyrrhi =

Scientific classification
- Kingdom: Animalia
- Phylum: Arthropoda
- Subphylum: Chelicerata
- Class: Arachnida
- Order: Araneae
- Infraorder: Araneomorphae
- Family: Agelenidae
- Genus: Tegenaria
- Species: T. regispyrrhi

Binomial name
- Tegenaria regispyrrhi Brignoli, 1976

Species of spider

Tegenaria regispyrrhi is a species of funnel-web spider in the family Agelenidae. It is native to the Balkans: North Macedonia, Bulgaria, and Greece.

The body length is 5.5 mm (0.22 in) for males and 4.8 mm (0.19 in) for females.
