= Tegenaria rhodiensis =

Scientific classification
- Kingdom: Animalia
- Phylum: Arthropoda
- Subphylum: Chelicerata
- Class: Arachnida
- Order: Araneae
- Infraorder: Araneomorphae
- Family: Agelenidae
- Genus: Tegenaria
- Species: T. rhodiensis

Binomial name
- Tegenaria rhodiensis Caporiacco, 1948

Synonyms
- Cicurina rhodiensis Roewer, 1955

Species of spider

Tegenaria rhodiensis is a species of spider in the family Agelenidae native to Rhodes and Turkey.
