= Tegenaria shillongensis =

Scientific classification
- Domain: Eukaryota
- Kingdom: Animalia
- Phylum: Arthropoda
- Subphylum: Chelicerata
- Class: Arachnida
- Order: Araneae
- Infraorder: Araneomorphae
- Family: Agelenidae
- Genus: Tegenaria
- Species: T. shillongensis

Binomial name
- Tegenaria shillongensis Barman, 1979

Species of spider

Tegenaria shillongensis is a species of funnel-web spiders belonging to the genus Tegenaria. It was first found in the Khasi and Jaintia hills in the Indian state of Meghalaya. It is endemic to India.
