= Tegenaria montana =

Scientific classification
- Kingdom: Animalia
- Phylum: Arthropoda
- Subphylum: Chelicerata
- Class: Arachnida
- Order: Araneae
- Infraorder: Araneomorphae
- Family: Agelenidae
- Genus: Tegenaria
- Species: T. montana

Binomial name
- Tegenaria montana Deltshev, 1993

Species of spider

Tegenaria montana is a funnel-web spider found in Bulgaria.
