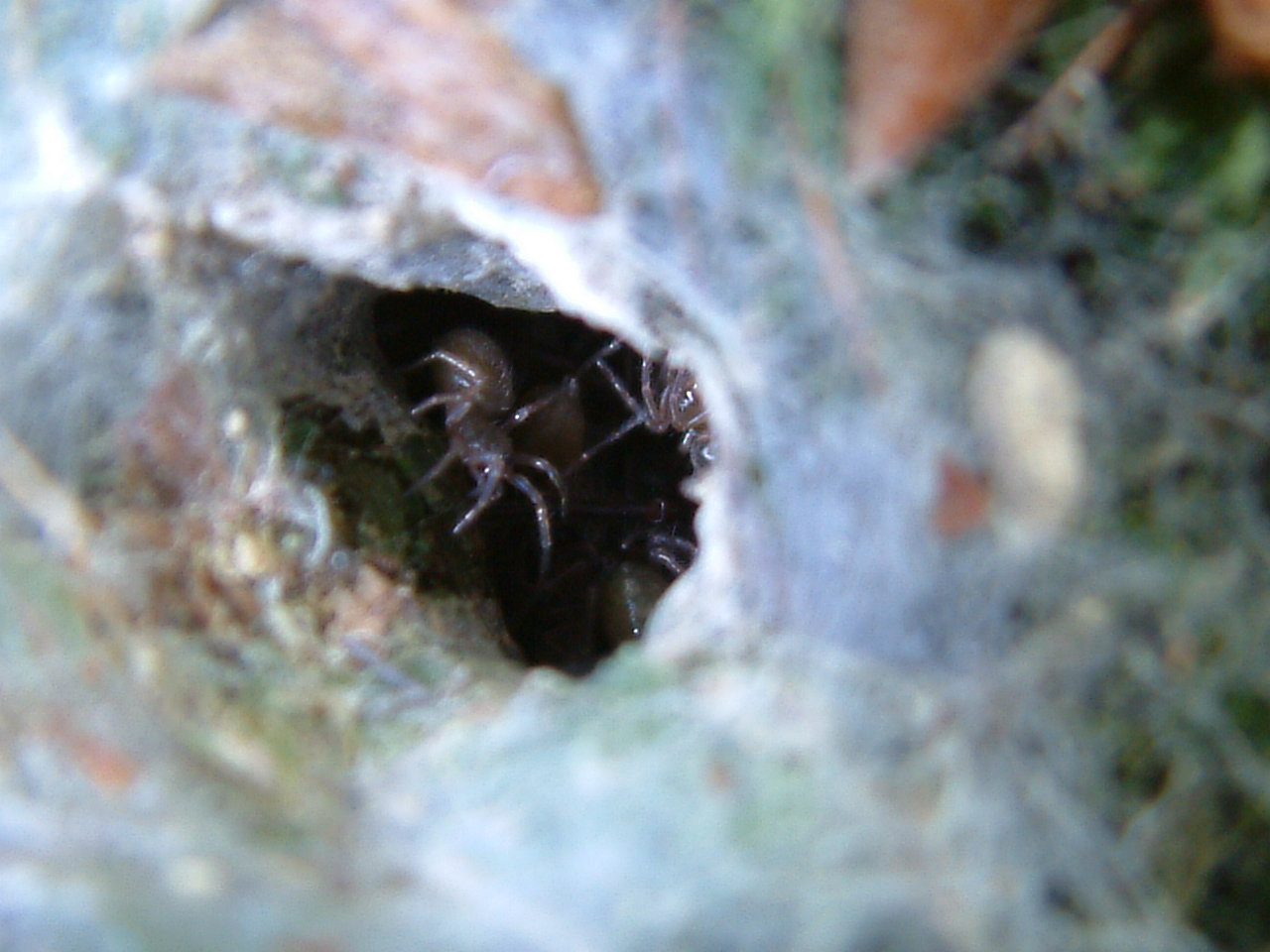
- Tegenaria silvestris spiders inside their web.

Scientific classification
- Domain: Eukaryota
- Kingdom: Animalia
- Phylum: Arthropoda
- Subphylum: Chelicerata
- Class: Arachnida
- Order: Araneae
- Infraorder: Araneomorphae
- Family: Agelenidae
- Genus: Tegenaria
- Species: T. silvestris

Binomial name
- Tegenaria silvestris L. Koch, 1872
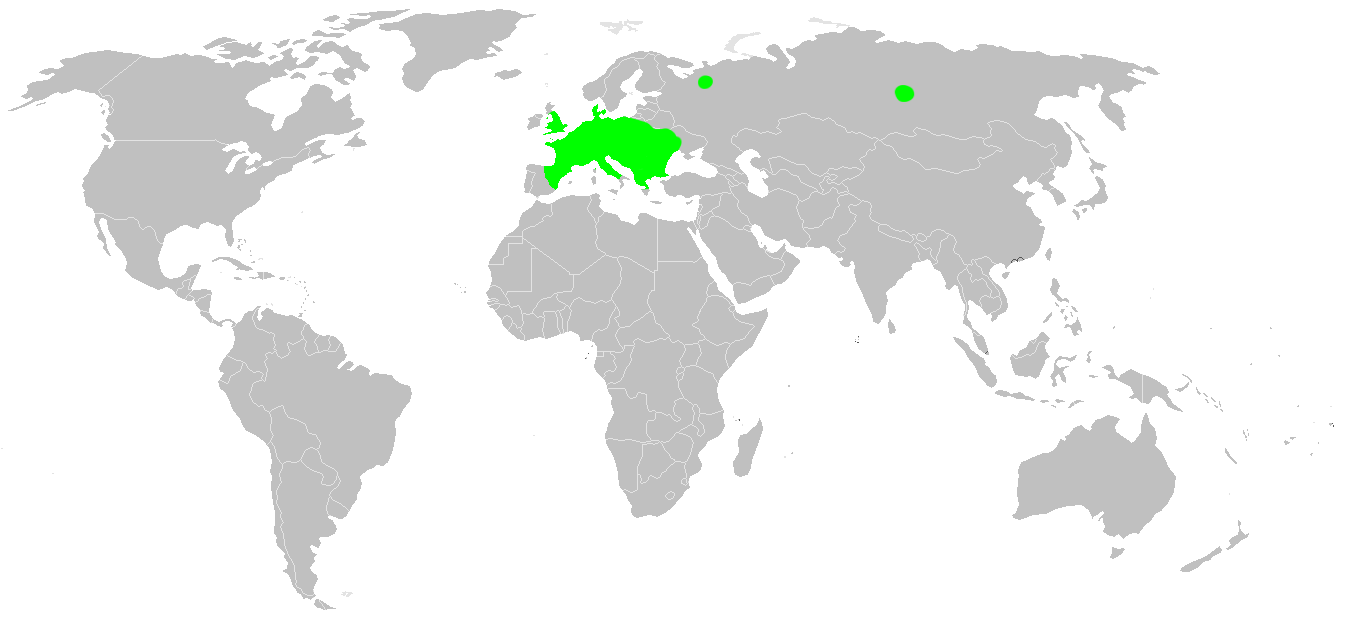

= Tegenaria silvestris =

Species of spider

The rare spider species Tegenaria silvestris is mostly found in caves, or on dumps; sometimes it occurs on forest edges, or in dry forests. It constructs its web under tree trunks and dead wood, and in tree caves.

It was transferred to the genus Malthonica in 2005, but back to Tegenaria in 2013.
