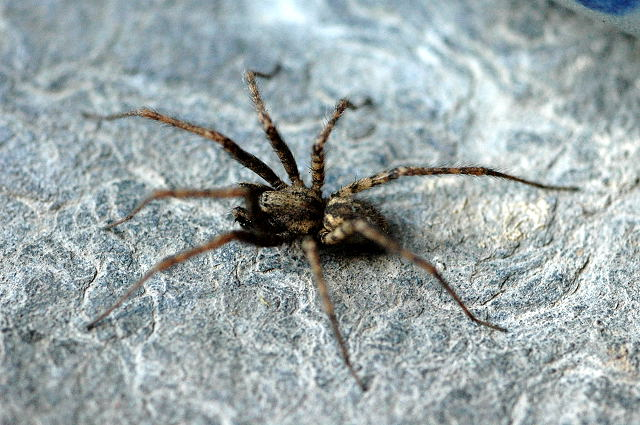

Scientific classification
- Kingdom: Animalia
- Phylum: Arthropoda
- Subphylum: Chelicerata
- Class: Arachnida
- Order: Araneae
- Infraorder: Araneomorphae
- Family: Agelenidae
- Genus: Tegenaria
- Species: T. ferruginea

Binomial name
- Tegenaria ferruginea (Panzer, 1804)
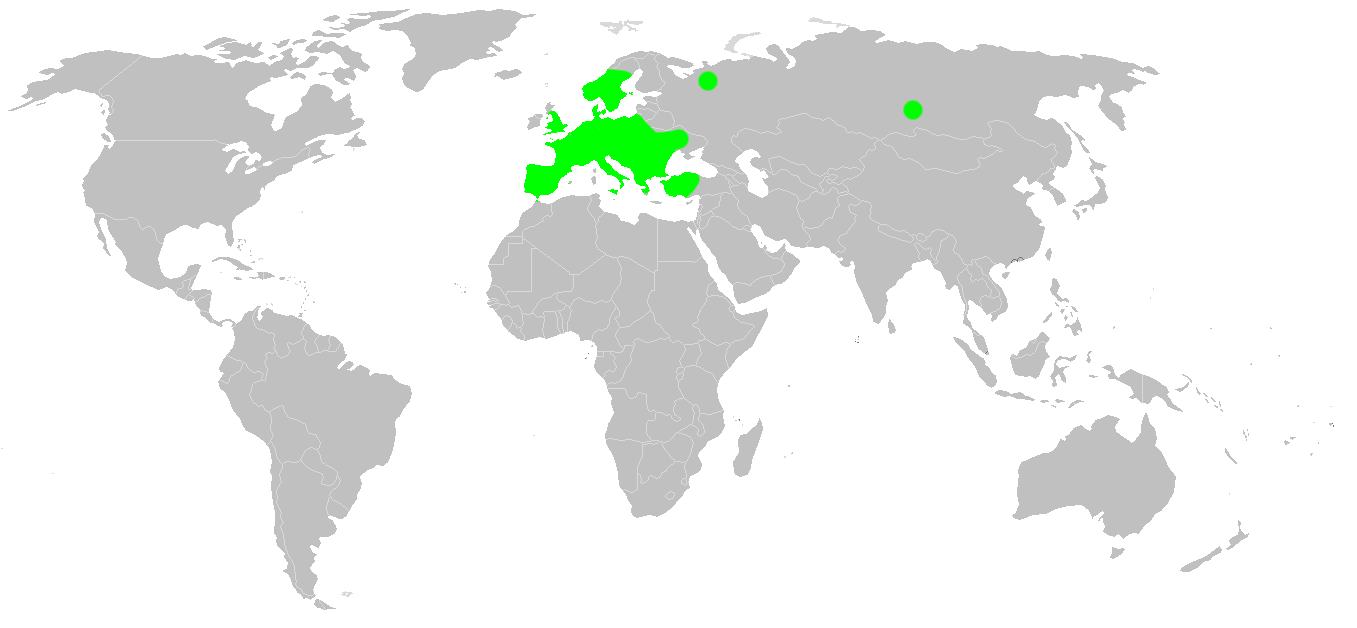

Synonyms
- Araneus domesticus Aranea ferruginea Aranea subpilosa Aranea stabularia Tegenaria domestica Tegenaria stabularia Tegenaria petrensis Philoeca domestica Tegenaria guyoni

= Tegenaria ferruginea =

Species of spider

Tegenaria ferruginea or charcoal spider is a European reddish, rather common spider with rusty markings on its back. The body looks rather similar to T. parietina, however the legs are much shorter and the funnel web built lacks backdoor exit. It was transferred to Malthonica in 2005, but back to Tegenaria in 2013.

Females grow up to 14 mm, males up to 11 mm. The spider lives mostly near the ground, in forests and in buildings. Adults appear from May to October.

== Name ==
The species names ferruginea is derived from Latin ferrugo "rust".

== Distribution ==
This spider occurs in Europe, and on the Azores. It is recorded in the 2011 checklist of Danish spider species.
