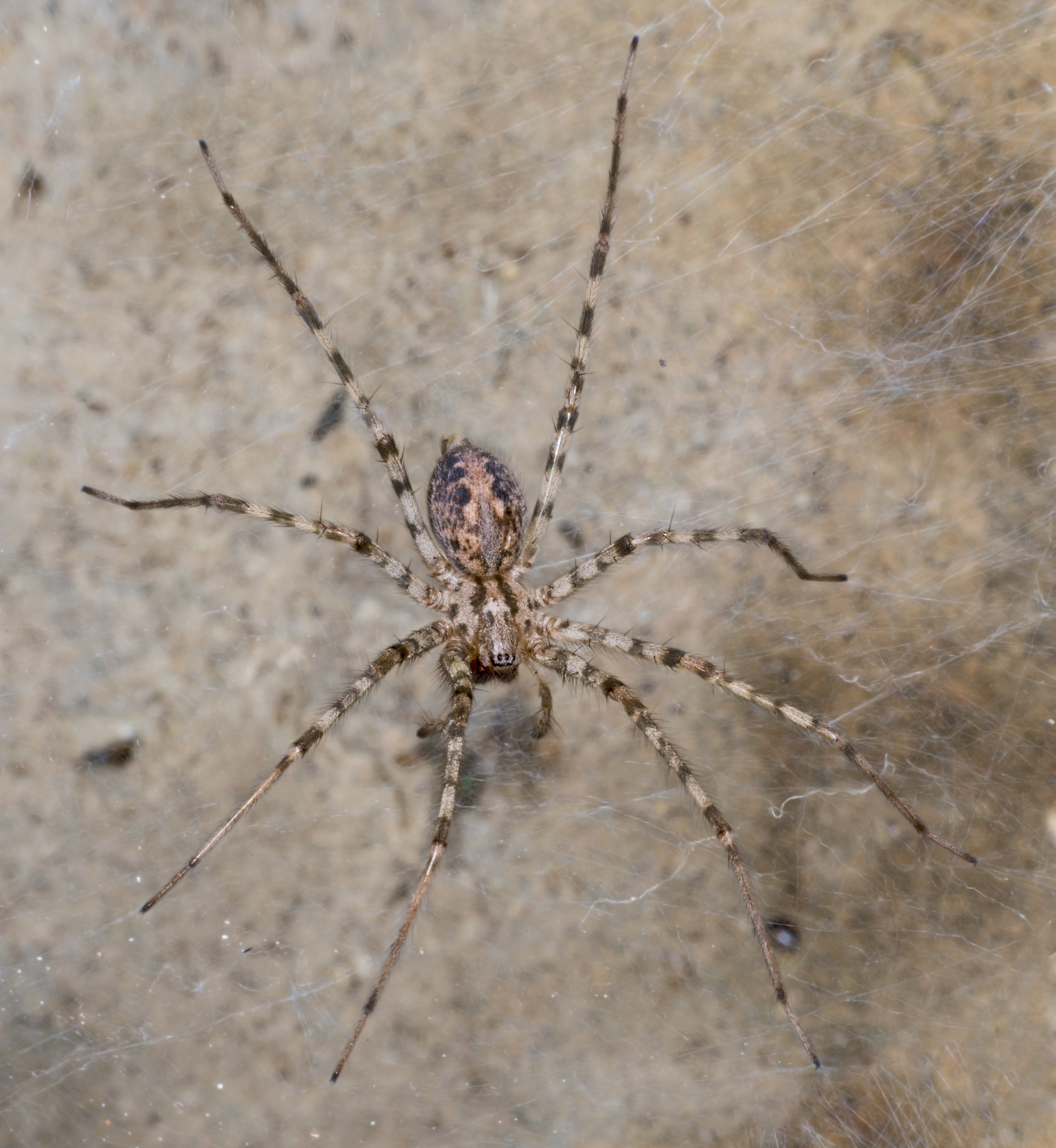

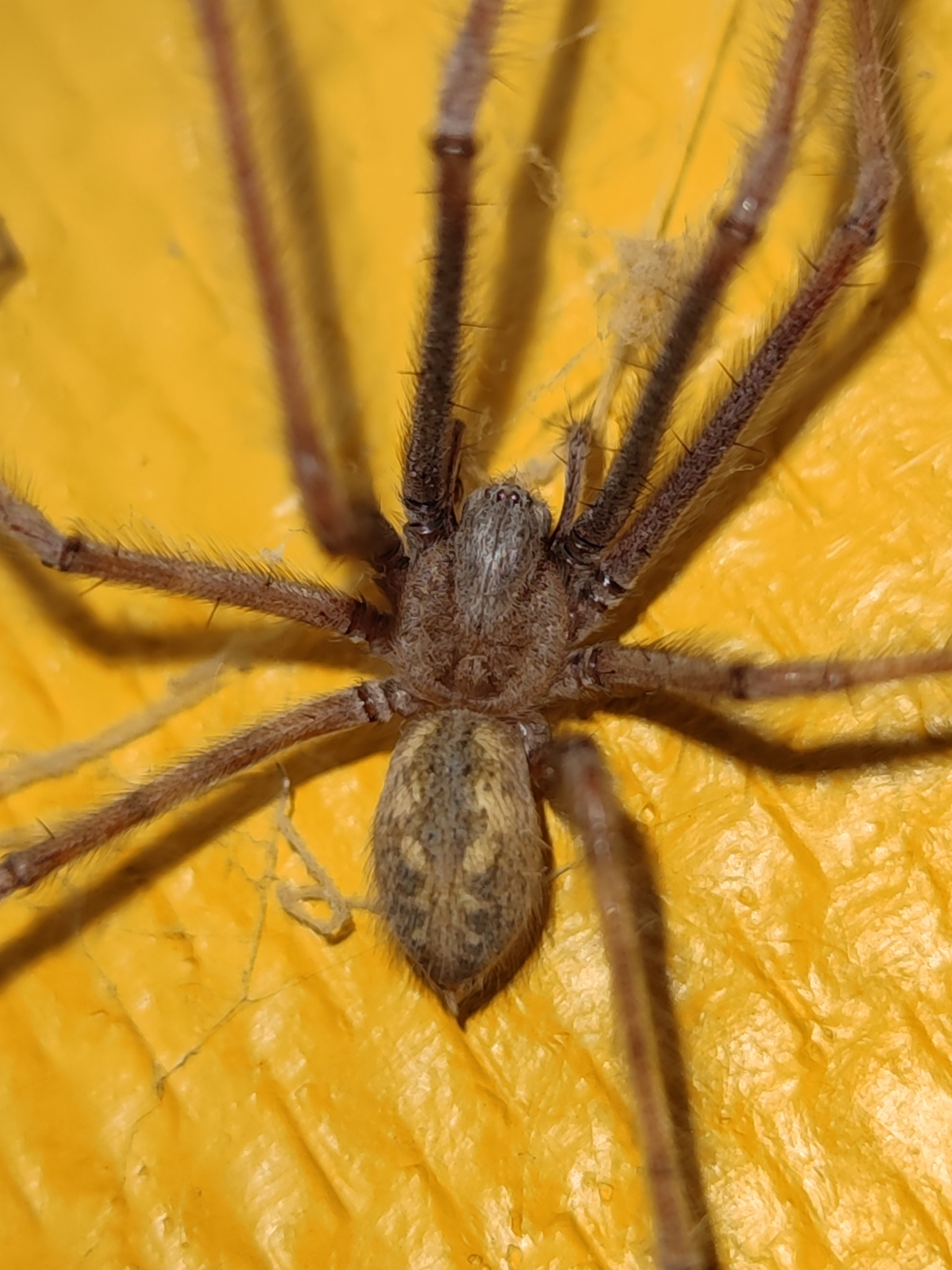

Scientific classification
- Kingdom: Animalia
- Phylum: Arthropoda
- Subphylum: Chelicerata
- Class: Arachnida
- Order: Araneae
- Infraorder: Araneomorphae
- Family: Agelenidae
- Genus: Tegenaria
- Species: T. parietina

Binomial name
- Tegenaria parietina (Fourcroy, 1785)

Synonyms
- Aranea parietina Fourcroy, 1785; Aranea phalangiodes Fourcroy, 1785; Tegenaria murina Walckenaer, 1805; Tegenaria saxatilis C. L. Koch, 1834; Tegenaria guyonii Guérin, 1837; Tegenaria intricata C. L. Koch, 1840; Tegenaria taprobanica Strand, 1907

= Tegenaria parietina =

Species of spider

Tegenaria parietina is a species of spider native to Europe. Its modern day distribution includes area from Northern Africa to Central Asia and Sri Lanka, and from the West Indies to Uruguay and Argentina, where it may have been introduced. In the UK - where it is the largest native species of spider - it is sometimes known as the cardinal spider, because of the legend that Cardinal Wolsey was terrified by this species at Hampton Court, or, conversely, because he regarded them as lucky and forbade anyone to harm them. In 2013, Tegenaria taprobanica was included in this species.

== Appearance ==
Females have a body length up to 20 mm, males up to 17 mm, with leg spans that can be up to three times larger. They are reddish brown, but young spiders may be much paler up to the last moult. Up close, they are easily differentiated from T. domestica by the lengths of their legs: the front pair is almost as long as species in the genus Eratigena, while the hind pair is unshortened and similar to T. domestica. They also have more abundant hair on their tibias.

Females can live for up to eight years, while males die shortly after mating. These spiders live mostly in buildings or walls. They look rather similar to T. ferruginea.

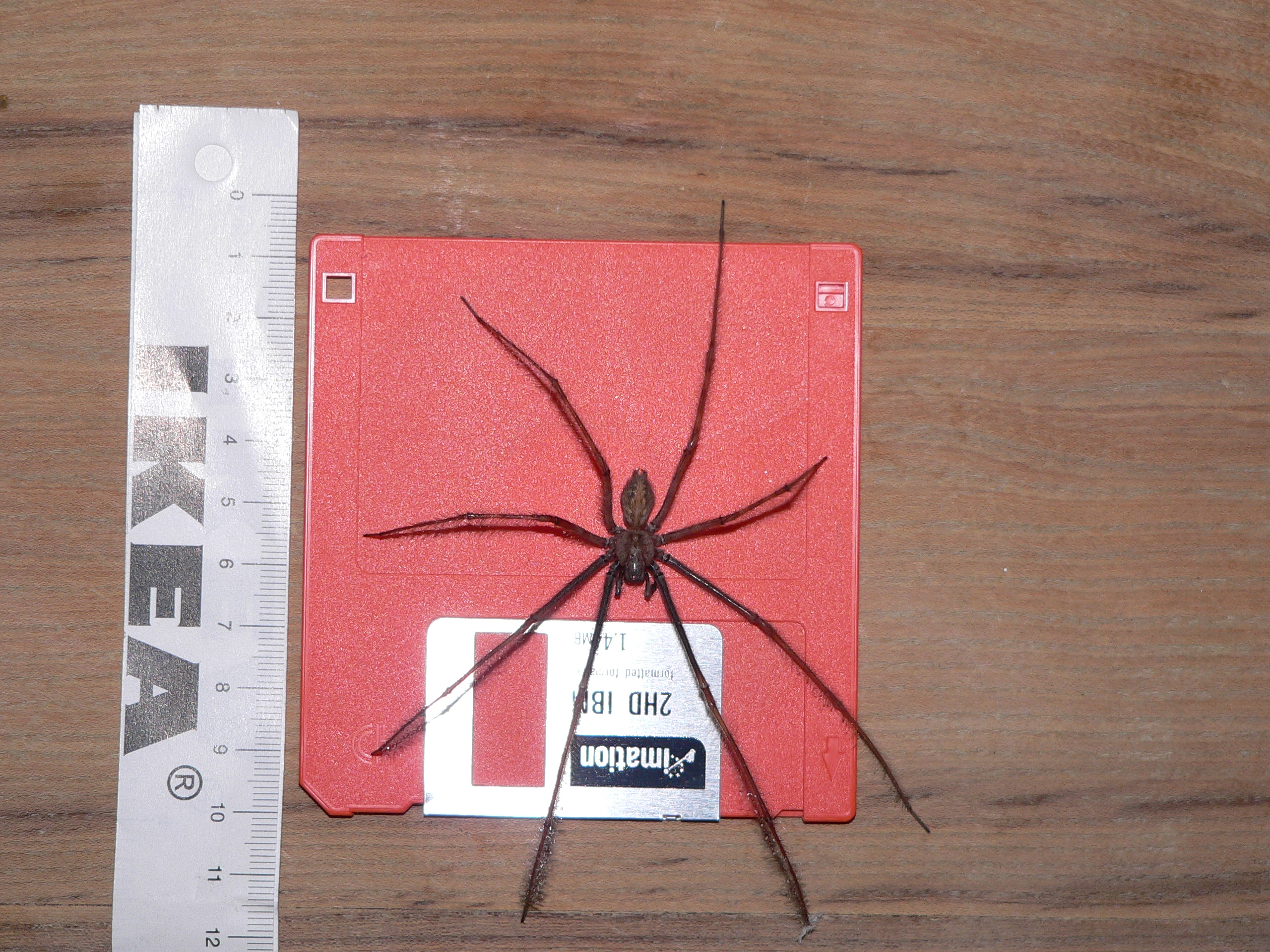
Tegenaria parietina with a 3.5 inch diskette in the background.

== Taxonomy ==
The species was first described by Antoine François de Fourcroy in 1785, as Aranea parietina. He called it "the brown domestic spider" that lived in the corners of rooms. It was given its current generic placement by Eugène Simon in 1875. It has been misidentified by several authors as Tegenaria domestica.

Tegenaria taprobanica was included in T. parietina by Bolzern et al. (2013), who considered that the very short original description of T. taprobanica would fit a very large specimen of T. parietina. The inclusion is recognized by the World Spider Catalog. Earlier sources treat T. taprobanica as a separate species.
