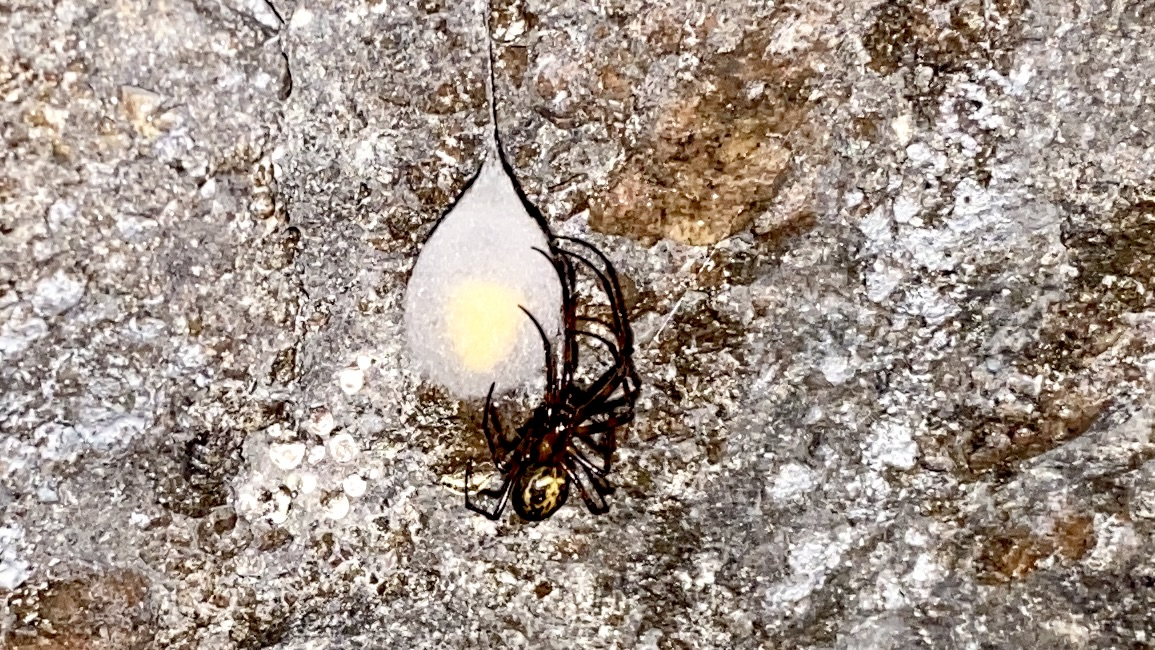
- In Nova Scotia, Canada

Scientific classification
- Domain: Eukaryota
- Kingdom: Animalia
- Phylum: Arthropoda
- Subphylum: Chelicerata
- Class: Arachnida
- Order: Araneae
- Infraorder: Araneomorphae
- Family: Tetragnathidae
- Genus: Meta
- Species: M. ovalis

Binomial name
- Meta ovalis (Gertsch, 1933)

= Meta ovalis =

Species of spider

Meta ovalis, otherwise known as the cave orbweaver, is a species of long-jawed orb weaver in the spider family Tetragnathidae. It is found in the United States and Canada.
