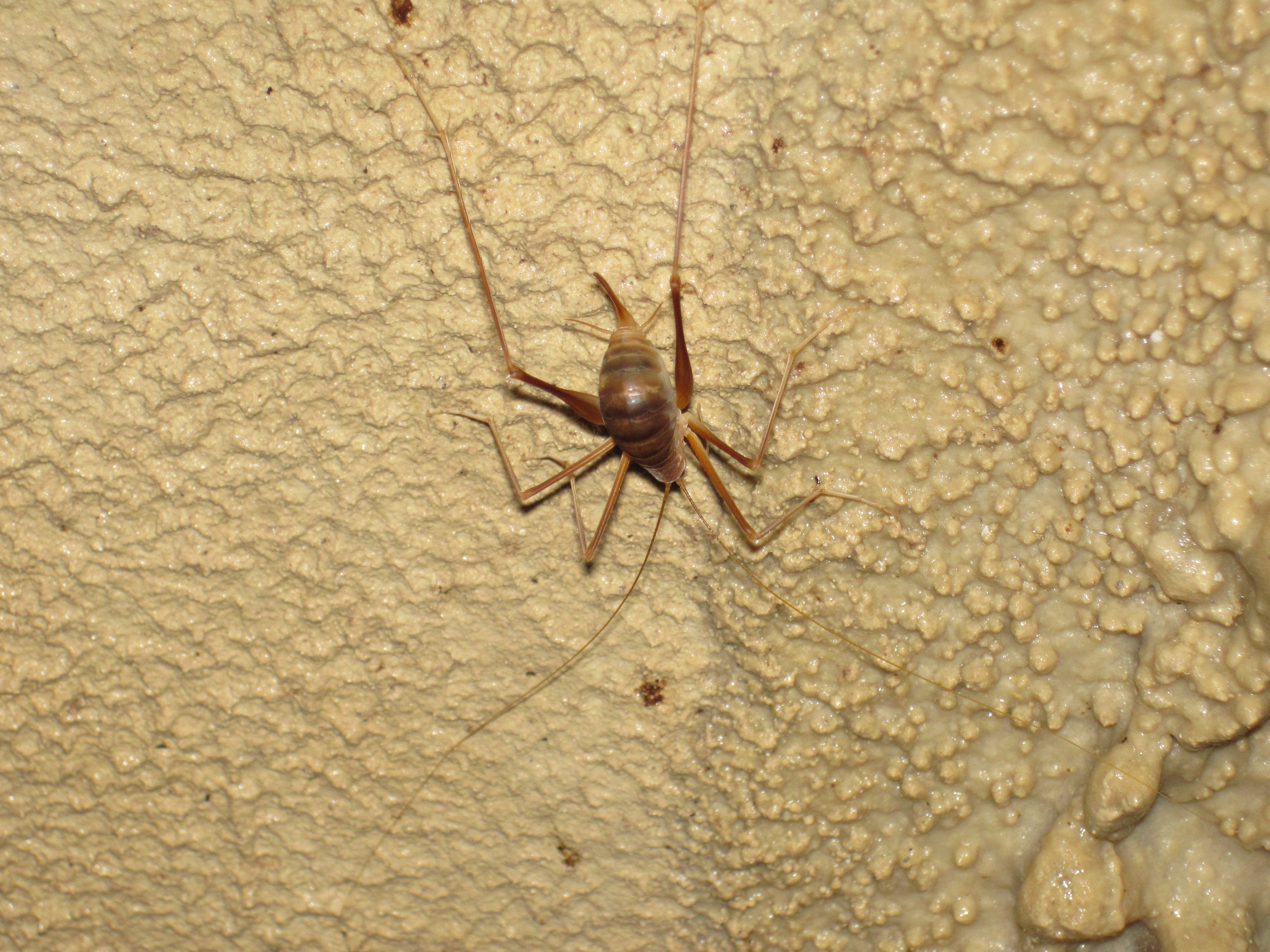
- Hadenoecus subterraneus, Mammoth Cave National Park

Scientific classification
- Domain: Eukaryota
- Kingdom: Animalia
- Phylum: Arthropoda
- Class: Insecta
- Order: Orthoptera
- Suborder: Ensifera
- Family: Rhaphidophoridae
- Genus: Hadenoecus
- Species: H. subterraneus

Binomial name
- Hadenoecus subterraneus (Scudder, 1861)

= Hadenoecus subterraneus =

Species of cricket-like animal

Hadenoecus subterraneus, the common cave cricket, or Mammoth Cave cricket is a species of camel cricket in the family Rhaphidophoridae. It is found in North America.

== Description ==
These insects use their antennae to feel around them, helping them navigate. They are troglophilic; while they prefer cavernous environments, they can also survive on the surface.

== Feeding ==
Cave crickets like H. subterraneus will eat whatever they can get because of the scarcity of food in cave environments. Like other cave crickets, they are often found roosting in the entrances of caves in the southeastern United States. They leave behind nutrients that many communities of cave organisms are dependent on in the form of guano, eggs, and carcasses.
