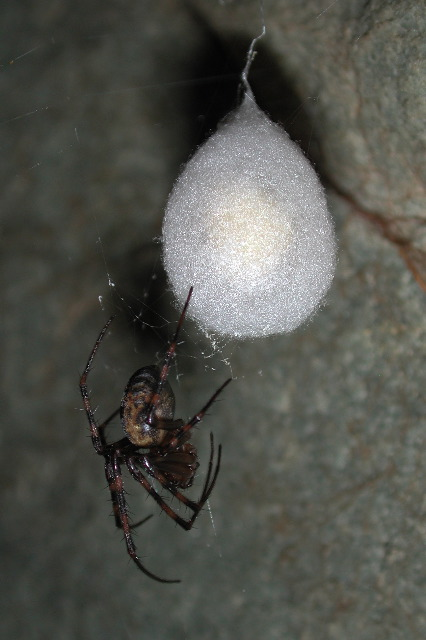
- Meta sp. with eggsac

Scientific classification
- Kingdom: Animalia
- Phylum: Arthropoda
- Subphylum: Chelicerata
- Class: Arachnida
- Order: Araneae
- Infraorder: Araneomorphae
- Family: Tetragnathidae
- Genus: Meta; C. L. Koch, 1835

Type species
- M. menardi (Latreille, 1804)

Species
- 33, see text

Synonyms
- Auchicybaeus Gertsch, 1933

= Meta (spider) =

Meta Temporal range: Palaeogene– Present

Genus of spiders

Meta is a genus of long-jawed orb-weavers that was first described by Ludwig Carl Christian Koch in 1835. They are often associated with caves, caverns, and recesses, earning some of them the name "cave orbweavers"

== Distribution ==
Spiders in this genus are found worldwide.

== Description ==
Meta species have a carapace slightly longer than wide with eyes in two rows, evenly spaced. The abdomen is long and oval, decorated with spots and silver coloration.

== Life style ==
The inclination of Meta webs varies from vertical to horizontal, most often at a sharp angle to the vertical. The hub is open with widely spaced viscid spirals. Most species spin their webs in shadowy, dark and damp places such as caves and shaded ravines. They are more common at higher altitudes.

== Species ==
As of October 2025, this genus includes 33 species:

- Meta abdomenalis Patel & Reddy, 1993 – India
- Meta birmanica Thorell, 1898 – Myanmar
- Meta bourneti Simon, 1922 – Europe, Georgia, North Africa
- Meta bowo Wang, Irfan, Chen & Zhang, 2022 – China
- Meta cona Wang, Irfan, Chen & Zhang, 2022 – China
- Meta dolloff Levi, 1980 – United States
- Meta gyirong Wang, Irfan, Chen & Zhang, 2022 – China
- Meta hamata Wang, Zhou, Irfan, Yang & Peng, 2020 – China
- Meta hongyuan Wang, Irfan, Chen & Zhang, 2022 – China
- Meta japonica Tanikawa, 1993 – Japan
- Meta longlingensis Wang, Zhou, Irfan, Yang & Peng, 2020 – China
- Meta manchurica Marusik & Koponen, 1992 – Russia (Far East), Korea
- Meta menardi (Latreille, 1804) – Europe, Turkey, Iran (type species)
- Meta meruensis Tullgren, 1910 – Tanzania, South Africa
- Meta mixta O. Pickard-Cambridge, 1885 – Pakistan
- Meta monogrammata Butler, 1876 – Australia (Queensland)
- Meta montana Hogg, 1919 – Indonesia (Sumatra)
- Meta nebulosa Schenkel, 1936 – China
- Meta nigridorsalis Tanikawa, 1994 – China, Japan
- Meta obscura Kulczyński, 1899 – Madeira
- Meta ovalis (Gertsch, 1933) – Canada, United States
- Meta qianshanensis C. D. Zhu & S. F. Zh, 1983 – China
- Meta serrana Franganillo, 1930 – Cuba
- Meta shenae Zhu, Song & Zhang, 2003 – China
- Meta simlaensis Tikader, 1982 – India
- Meta stridulans Wunderlich, 1987 – Madeira
- Meta tangi Wang, Zhou, Irfan, Yang & Peng, 2020 – China
- Meta tibet Wang, Irfan, Chen & Zhang, 2022 – China
- Meta turbatrix Keyserling, 1887 – Australia (New South Wales)
- Meta wanglang Wang, Irfan, Chen & Zhang, 2022 – China
- Meta weining Wang, Irfan, Chen & Zhang, 2022 – China
- Meta yani Wang, Zhou, Irfan, Yang & Peng, 2020 – China
- Meta yinae Wang, Zhou, Irfan, Yang & Peng, 2020 – China

=== Synonyms ===
Synonyms include:

- Meta americana Marusik & Koponen, 1992 = Meta ovalis (Gertsch, 1933)
- Meta milleri Kratochvíl, 1942 = Meta bourneti Simon, 1922

=== Dubious names ===
Nomina dubia (dubious names) include:

- Meta nigra Franganillo, 1920
