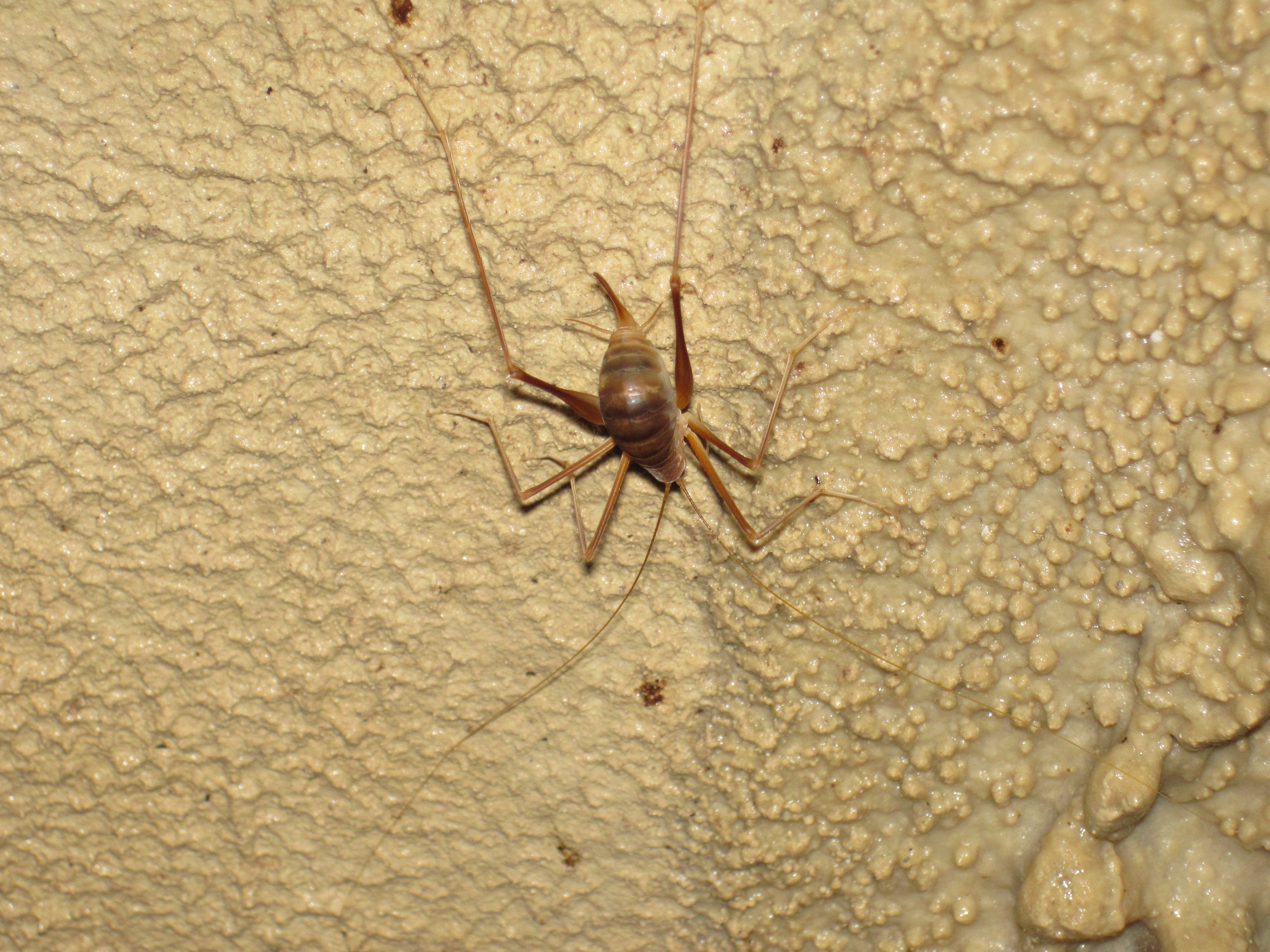
- Hadenoecus subterraneus

Scientific classification
- Domain: Eukaryota
- Kingdom: Animalia
- Phylum: Arthropoda
- Class: Insecta
- Order: Orthoptera
- Suborder: Ensifera
- Family: Rhaphidophoridae
- Subfamily: Ceuthophilinae
- Tribe: Hadenoecini; Ander, 1939

= Hadenoecini =

Tribe of cricket-like animals

Hadenoecini is a tribe of cave crickets in the family Rhaphidophoridae. There are two genera and nine described species. It is sometimes considered a synonym of the subfamily Dolichopodainae.

They are pale and spider-like, occurring in forests and caves in the eastern United States. They are sometimes referred to as white cave-crickets.

== Genera ==
Two genera are included in the tribe Hadenoecini.

- Euhadenoecus Hubbell, 1978
- Hadenoecus Scudder, 1863
