= Devernodes =

Scientific classification
- Kingdom: Animalia
- Phylum: Arthropoda
- Class: Insecta
- Order: Coleoptera
- Suborder: Polyphaga
- Infraorder: Cucujiformia
- Family: Curculionidae
- Subfamily: Molytinae
- Genus: Devernodes; Grebennikov, 2018

Type species
- Devernodes chthonia Grebennikov, 2018

Genus of beetles

Devernodes is a genus of flightless weevils belonging to the family Curculionidae, subfamily Molytinae and tribe Lymantini. First described in 2018 by Vasily Vikotorivich Grebennikov, it comprises weevil species found in leaf-litter habitats in China, Malaysia and Vietnam. Initially, the genus was believed to belong to the Asian Stromboscerini tribe of the Dryophthorinae subfamily. Later Devernodes was placed in the Lymantini tribe due to its unique head constriction separating the eye-bearing rostrum from its head capsule and complete female hemisternites. These features, particularly the former, are unknown in Stromboscerini but are diagnostic features of the Lymantini tribe found in the Americas. It was later confirmed in 2022 through a DNA and morphological analysis that Devernodes belongs to the Lymantini tribe. As such, the Devernodes represent the first record of Lymantini weevils found outside the Americas.

== Discovery ==
Devernodes was first discovered in 2009 during fieldwork on the forested slopes of Mount Emei Shan in Sichuan, China. Additional species were also discovered in Vietnam and Malaysia.

== Taxonomy ==
Devernodes is a genus of weevils - arthropods in the insect family Curculionidae, subfamily Molytinae, and tribe Lymantini. This genus was established in 2018 by Dr. Vasily V. Grebennikov following the discovery of five new species from Southeast Asia: Devernodes alkippe, Devernodes asteria, Devernodes chthonia (the type species), Devernodes drimo and Devernodes methone . The genus Devernodes is notable because it represents the first known occurrence of Lymantini weevils outside the Americas, expanding the known geographic range of the tribe beyond its previously recognised limits.

== Phylogeny ==
The Lymantini tribe initially included several genera found primarily in the Americas. The results of a phylogenetic analysis in 2022 confirmed that Devernodes are more closely related to the American Lymantini subtribe Lymantina than to any Asian weevil tribe, particularly the Stromboscerini tribe, to which the first specimens were initially assigned to prior to their identification as a separate genus.

The presence of Devernodes in Southeast Asia, despite all other Lymantina being American, suggests what scientists call amphi-Pacific disjunct distribution. This term describes closely related organisms that exist on opposite sides of the Pacific Ocean despite the vast geographical distance between them. This puzzle was resolved through a biogeographic hypothesis: The ancestors of Devernodes likely dispersed overland across Arctic land bridges (which are now submerged) during warmer periods of the Cenozoic Era (66 million years ago until today), specifically during the Eocene. Thus Lymantini populations were established in Asia before climatic cooling divided the continents and fragmented the populations. One of which eventually evolved into the current genus Devernodes.

== Species ==
The genus Devernodes comprises five species:

- Devernodes alkipipe Grebennikov, 2018 (first recorded on Mount Emei in Sichuan, China)
- Devernodes asteria Grebennikov, 2018 (first recorded in the Tam Dao Mountains of northern Vietnam)
- Devernodes chthonia Grebennikov, 2018 (first recorded in the Tam Dao Mountains of northern Vietnam)
- Devernodes drimo Grebennikov, 2018 (first recorded in Pasoh Forest Reserve in Malaysia)
- Devernodes methone Grebennikov, 2018 (first recorded at Tanah Rata, Malaysia)
