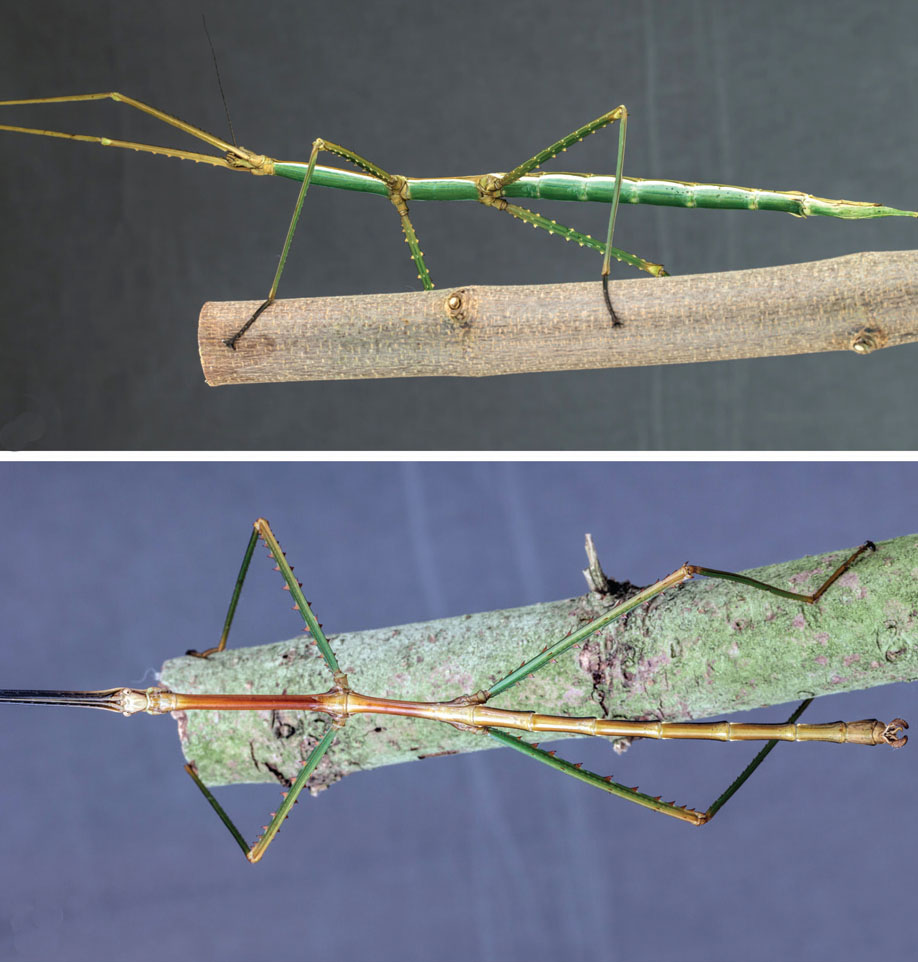
- Phryganistria bachmaensis

Scientific classification
- Domain: Eukaryota
- Kingdom: Animalia
- Phylum: Arthropoda
- Class: Insecta
- Order: Phasmatodea
- Family: Phasmatidae
- Tribe: Pharnaciini
- Genus: Phryganistria; Stål, 1875

Type species
- Bacteria sarmentosa Westwood, 1848

= Phryganistria =

Genus of stick insects

Phryganistria is a genus of stick insects belonging to the subfamily Clitumninae, native to Mainland Southeast Asia, including Yunnan China, central Vietnam and Bangladesh. The species in this genus have been subject to revision, with several being reassigned to the related Neophryganistria.

As with other genera in the tribe Pharnaciini, Phryganistria stick insects are notable for their range in size from "fairly large to very large", and amongst the world's longest stick insects (which also makes it the longest known insects).

== Species ==
The genus includes the following:

1. Phryganistria bachmaensis (Ta & Hoang, 2004) - Vietnam
2. Phryganistria laikuenae Ho, 2023 - Yunnan
3. Phryganistria virgea (Westwood, 1848) - type species (as Bacteria sarmentosa Westwood, 1848) - Bangladesh

=== Reassigned species ===
The following species, previously placed here, are now in genus Neophryganistria:

- Phryganistria fruhstorferi Brunner von Wattenwyl, 1907
- P. grandis Rehn, 1906
- P. guanxiensis Chen & He, 2008
- P. heusii Hennemann & Conle, 1997
- P. longzhouensis Chen & He, 2008
- P. tamdaoensis J. Bresseel & J Constant, 2014

=== Phryganistria "chinensis" ===
Claimed to be the world's longest stick insect, the informally named Phryganistria "chinensis", discovered in 2014 near Liuzhou in Guangxi, China, apparently remains an undescribed species after more than 10 years. A wild collected female kept at the Insect Museum of West China was the record holder at 624 millimetres (24.6 in) in total length (including extended legs), but it was surpassed by one of its captive bred young that reached 640 millimetres (25 in).

== See also ==
- List of largest insects
