= Gigantettix =

Scientific classification
- Domain: Eukaryota
- Kingdom: Animalia
- Phylum: Arthropoda
- Class: Insecta
- Order: Orthoptera
- Suborder: Ensifera
- Family: Rhaphidophoridae
- Tribe: Diestramimini
- Genus: Gigantettix; Gorochov, 1998

Genus of cricket-like animals

Gigantettix is a genus of camel crickets in the subfamily Aemodogryllinae and tribe Diestramimini. The type species, from Vietnam, was originally assigned to the genus Diestramima (D. gigantea Gorochov); subsequently, other species have been found in the Indo-China region.

== Species ==
The Orthoptera Species File lists:

- Gigantettix gigantea (Gorochov, 1992) – type species
- Gigantettix laosensis Gorochov & Storozhenko, 2015
- Gigantettix longipes (Rehn, 1906)
- Gigantettix maximus Gorochov, 1998
- Gigantettix minusculus Gorochov, 1998
- Gigantettix sapaensis Gorochov, 2002
