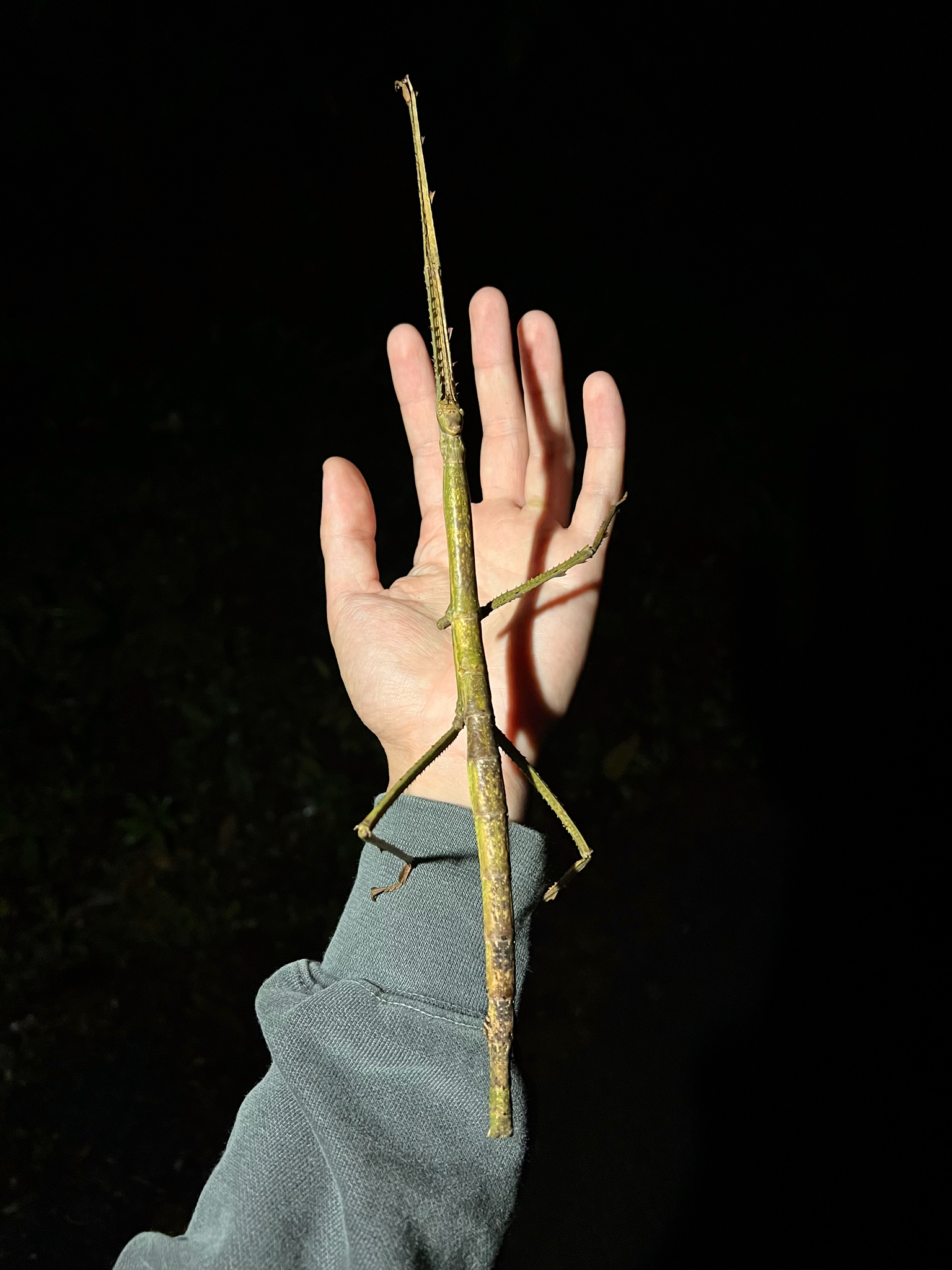

Scientific classification
- Kingdom: Animalia
- Phylum: Arthropoda
- Clade: Pancrustacea
- Class: Insecta
- Order: Phasmatodea
- Family: Phasmatidae
- Subfamily: Clitumninae
- Tribe: Pharnaciini
- Genus: Tirachoidea
- Species: T. biceps

Binomial name
- Tirachoidea biceps (Redtenbacher, 1908)

Synonyms
- Pharnacia chiniensis (Seow-Choen, 1998)

= Tirachoidea biceps =

Species of stick insect

Tirachoidea biceps is a species of stick insect in the order Phasmatodea. It is endemic to Java, Peninsular Malaysia, and Sumatra. Females of this species average 195 mm (7.7 in) and are apterous. Although males are fully winged, their flight capability is poor. Tirachoidea biceps was previously classified in the genus Pharnacia but is distinguishable by two bumps on their hind head.
