= Tamdaotettix =

Scientific classification
- Domain: Eukaryota
- Kingdom: Animalia
- Phylum: Arthropoda
- Class: Insecta
- Order: Orthoptera
- Suborder: Ensifera
- Family: Rhaphidophoridae
- Tribe: Diestramimini
- Genus: Tamdaotettix; Gorochov, 1998

Genus of cricket-like animals

External image
- Image at iNaturalist

Tamdaotettix is a genus of cave or camel crickets in the subfamily Aemodogryllinae and tribe Diestramimini. Originating in Asia, species have been found in the Indo-China region.

The first species to be found, Tamdaotettix vinhphuensis, was placed in the similar genus Atachycines by A.V. Gorochov, based on specimens found in Tam Dao National Park in the Vinh Phu Province of Vietnam.

== Species ==
The Orthoptera Species File lists:

subgenus Laotettix Gorochov & Storozhenko, 2015

1. Tamdaotettix curvatus Gorochov & Storozhenko, 2015
2. Tamdaotettix gracilus (Zhu, Wu & Shi, 2018)
3. Tamdaotettix inflatus Gorochov & Storozhenko, 2015
4. Tamdaotettix minutus Gorochov & Storozhenko, 2015
5. Tamdaotettix sympatricus Gorochov & Storozhenko, 2015
6. Tamdaotettix tarasovi Gorochov & Storozhenko, 2015
7. Tamdaotettix truncatus Qin, Wang & Li, 2019

subgenus Tamdaotettix Gorochov, 1998

1. Tamdaotettix aculeatus Gorochov & Storozhenko, 2015
2. Tamdaotettix ailaoshanicus Gorochov & Storozhenko, 2019
3. Tamdaotettix dilutus Gorochov, 1998 - type species
4. Tamdaotettix flexus Gorochov & Storozhenko, 2015
5. Tamdaotettix laocai Gorochov & Storozhenko, 2015
6. Tamdaotettix longituberus Zhu, Bian & Shi, 2018
7. Tamdaotettix minipullus Gorochov & Storozhenko, 2019
8. Tamdaotettix pullus Gorochov, 1998
9. Tamdaotettix semipullus Gorochov, 1998
10. Tamdaotettix tridenticulatus Qin, Liu & Li, 2016
11. Tamdaotettix vinhphuensis (Gorochov, 1992)

subgenus not determined

1. Tamdaotettix robustus Gorochov & Storozhenko, 2015
