= Paradiestrammena =

Scientific classification
- Domain: Eukaryota
- Kingdom: Animalia
- Phylum: Arthropoda
- Class: Insecta
- Order: Orthoptera
- Suborder: Ensifera
- Family: Rhaphidophoridae
- Tribe: Aemodogryllini
- Genus: Paradiestrammena; Chopard, 1916

Genus of cricket-like animals

Paradiestrammena is a genus of cave or camel crickets in the subfamily Aemodogryllinae and tribe Aemodogryllini. Originating in Asia, species have been found in Borneo, the Indo-China region and Japan.

== Species ==
The Orthoptera Species File lists:

- Paradiestrammena autumnalis (Gorochov, 1994)
- Paradiestrammena contumi Gorochov, 2002
- Paradiestrammena enata Gorochov, 2002
- Paradiestrammena gravelyi (Chopard, 1916) - type species (as Diestrammena gravelyi Chopard) - from the Lengong Caves, Perak, Malaysia.
- Paradiestrammena maculata (Chopard, 1916)
- Paradiestrammena mistshenkoi (Gorochov, 1998)
- Paradiestrammena sarawakana (Chopard, 1940)
- Paradiestrammena storozhenkoi (Gorochov, 1998)
- Paradiestrammena tarbinskyi Gorochov, 1998
- Paradiestrammena trigona Zhu, Lu & Shi, 2020
- Paradiestrammena vernalis Gorochov, 1998
- Paradiestrammena vitalisi Chopard, 1919
- Paradiestrammena xima Zhu, Lu & Shi, 2020
