= Neoserica tamdaoensis =

Scientific classification
- Kingdom: Animalia
- Phylum: Arthropoda
- Class: Insecta
- Order: Coleoptera
- Suborder: Polyphaga
- Infraorder: Scarabaeiformia
- Family: Scarabaeidae
- Genus: Neoserica
- Species: N. tamdaoensis

Binomial name
- Neoserica tamdaoensis Ahrens, 2003

Species of beetle

Neoserica tamdaoensis is a species of beetle of the family Scarabaeidae. It is found in Vietnam.

== Description ==
Adults reach a length of about 7.1–9 mm. They have a black, short-oval body. Part of the upper surface has a greenish shimmer. They are mostly dull with dense light hairs, interspersed with dense, long, strong, dark hairs. The underside is densely haired.

== Etymology ==
The species is named after the type locality, Tam Dao.
