= Microtachycines =

Scientific classification
- Domain: Eukaryota
- Kingdom: Animalia
- Phylum: Arthropoda
- Class: Insecta
- Order: Orthoptera
- Suborder: Ensifera
- Family: Rhaphidophoridae
- Tribe: Aemodogryllini
- Genus: Microtachycines; Gorochov, 1992

Genus of cricket-like animals

Microtachycines is a genus of cave or camel crickets in the subfamily Aemodogryllinae and tribe Aemodogryllini. The type species name M. tamdaonensis is based on specimens found in Tam Dao National Park in Vietnam.

== Species ==
The Orthoptera Species File lists:

- Microtachycines elongatus Qin, Liu & Li, 2017
- Microtachycines fallax Qin, Liu & Li, 2017
- Microtachycines tamdaonensis Gorochov, 1992 - type species, locality Tam Đảo, Vietnam
