= Diestrammena griffinii =

Scientific classification
- Kingdom: Animalia
- Phylum: Arthropoda
- Class: Insecta
- Order: Orthoptera
- Suborder: Ensifera
- Family: Rhaphidophoridae
- Genus: Diestrammena
- Subgenus: Diestrammena
- Species: D. griffinii

Binomial name
- Diestrammena griffinii Chopard, 1916

Species of cricket-like animal

Diestrammena griffinii is a species of camel crickets in the tribe Aemodogryllini and subgenus Diestrammena. It has been recorded from Vietnam: the type locality was near Tuyen Quan, NW of Hanoi.
