= Tirachoidea cantori =

Scientific classification
- Kingdom: Animalia
- Phylum: Arthropoda
- Class: Insecta
- Order: Phasmatodea
- Family: Phasmatidae
- Subfamily: Clitumninae
- Tribe: Pharnaciini
- Genus: Tirachoidea
- Species: T. cantori

Binomial name
- Tirachoidea cantori (Westwood, 1859)

Species of stick insect

Tirachoidea cantori or Cantor's stick insect is a species of stick insect in the order Phasmatodea. It is commonly found in Peninsular Malaysia, Myanmar, Sumatra, and Thailand. Females of this species can reach over 200 mm. Males are winged.
