= Eutachycines =

Scientific classification
- Domain: Eukaryota
- Kingdom: Animalia
- Phylum: Arthropoda
- Class: Insecta
- Order: Orthoptera
- Suborder: Ensifera
- Family: Rhaphidophoridae
- Tribe: Aemodogryllini
- Genus: Eutachycines; Storozhenko, 1990

Synonyms
- Tachycinoides Gorochov, 1994

Genus of cricket-like animals

Eutachycines is a genus of cave or camel crickets in the subfamily Aemodogryllinae and tribe Aemodogryllini. Originating in Asia, species have been found in Sri Lanka, southern China, Indo-China and west Malesia.

== Species ==
The Orthoptera Species File lists:

- Eutachycines annandalei Kirby, 1908
- Eutachycines beybienkoi Gorochov, 1998
- Eutachycines brevifrons Chopard, 1916
- Eutachycines caecus Chopard, 1924
- Eutachycines cassani Chopard, 1954
- Eutachycines ceylonica Chopard, 1916
- Eutachycines feai (Chopard, 1916) - type species (as Diestrammena feai Chopard)
- Eutachycines gialaiensis Gorochov, 1994
- Eutachycines hainani Gorochov, 2010
- Eutachycines kongtumensis Gorochov, 1990
- Eutachycines nigricauda Chopard, 1919
- Eutachycines paulus Gorochov, 1992
- Eutachycines vandermeermohri Willemse, 1936
