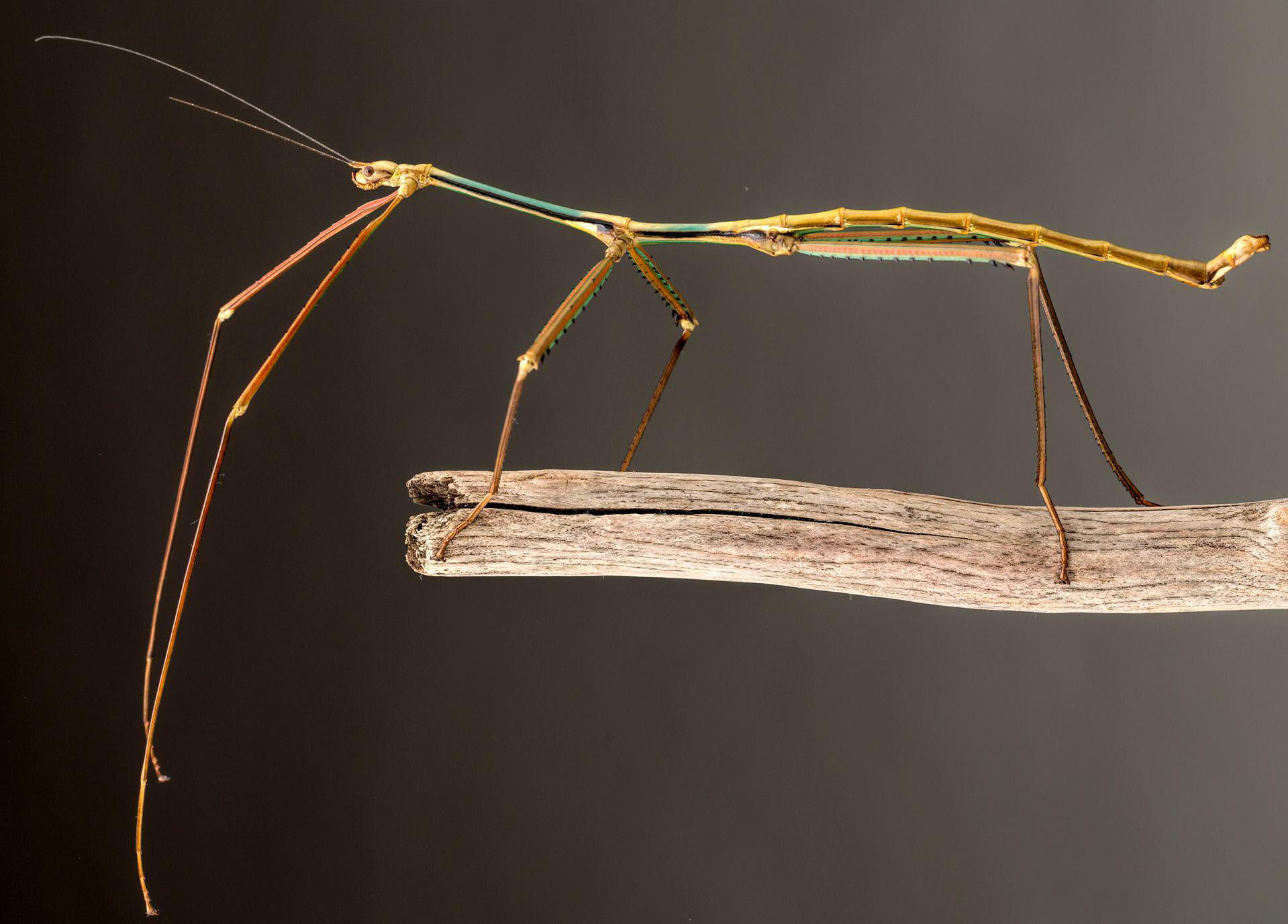
- Male Neophryganistria tamdaoensis

Scientific classification
- Kingdom: Animalia
- Phylum: Arthropoda
- Clade: Pancrustacea
- Class: Insecta
- Order: Phasmatodea
- Family: Phasmatidae
- Subfamily: Clitumninae
- Tribe: Pharnaciini
- Genus: Neophryganistria
- Species: N. tamdaoensis

Binomial name
- Neophryganistria tamdaoensis (Bresseel and Constant), 2014

Synonyms
- Phryganistria tamdaoensis Bresseel and Constant, 2014

= Neophryganistria tamdaoensis =

Species of stick insect

Neophryganistria tamdaoensis, originally described as Phryganistria tamdaoensis, is a species of stick insect belonging to the family of giant stick insects. It was described in 2014 based on specimens from the Tam Đảo National Park in Vietnam, hence, the specific name tamdaoensis. It was described by Joachim Bresseel and Jérôme Constant, biologists of the Royal Belgian Institute of Natural Sciences (RBINS). In the same paper they also reported the discovery of another new subspecies, Neophryganistria heusii yentuensis, which – measuring 32 cm long – is the second biggest insect known to date. In contrast, P. tamdaoensis, measuring only 23 cm long, is one of the smallest species under giant sticks.

In 2015, the International Institute for Species Exploration names it as one of the "Top 10 New Species" for new species discovered in 2014. They were included in the list because of their body shape and colour, making them "masters of camouflage".

== Discovery ==
The first specimens were collected in August 2010 by J. Constant and P. Limbourg, both of the Royal Belgian Institute of Natural Sciences, from Tam Đảo National Park in northwestern Vietnam. Since then more specimens were collected every year from different localities, including the Da Krong Nature Reserve and Tay Yen Tu Nature Reserve. However, they are so far only seen within central and north Vietnam. It was described as new species of stick insect in 2014 in the journal European Journal of Taxonomy.

== Description ==
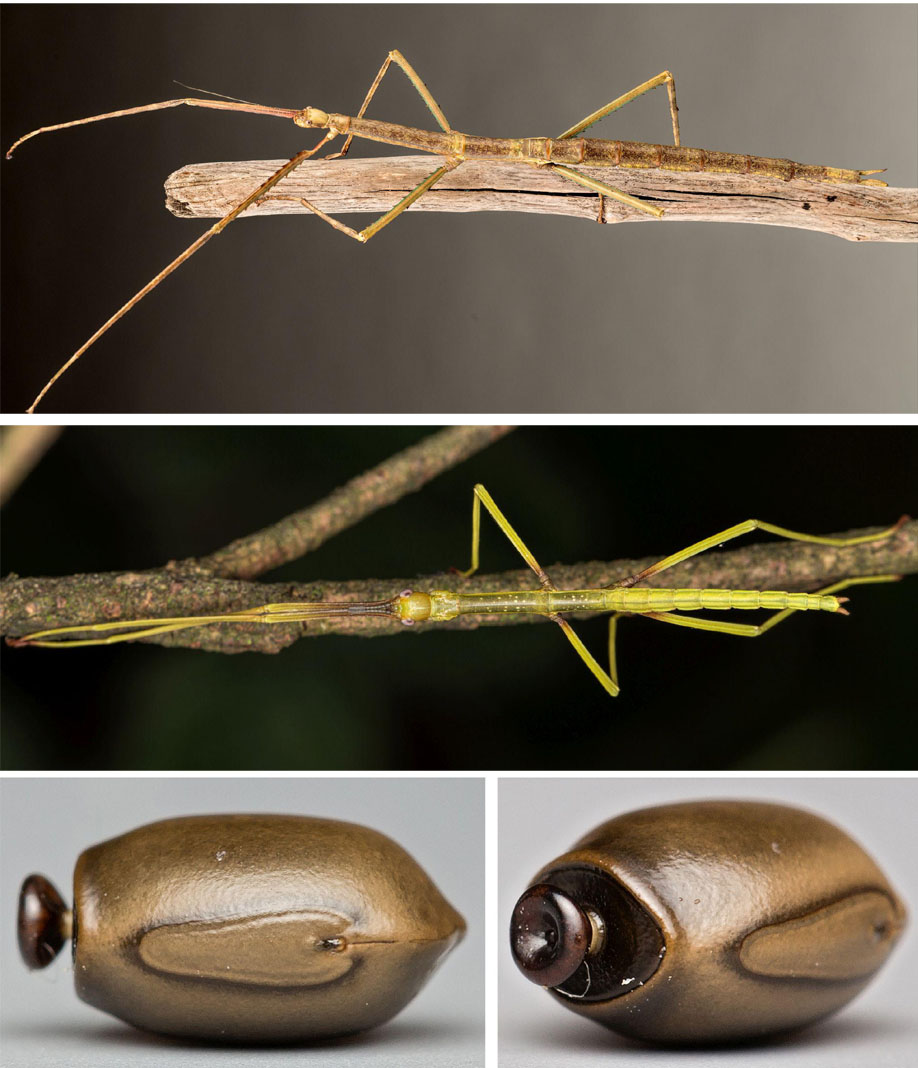
Adult female (top), nymph (centre), and eggs (bottom).

Neophryganistria tamdaoensis can be identified from species of Phryganistria from the presence of cerci (the last paired appendages in the abdomen), which are comparatively flattened. These structures are particularly enlarged and elongated in females, which are not so in other species. The body measures 23 cm long (54 cm if its appendages are stretched out), and 9.3 cm broad at its widest region. The subapical spine on the outer ventral carinae of meso- and meta-femora in male is less conspicuous than in other species. The body surface is smooth and shiny. Another diagnostic feature in males is unique colour pattern. The head, anterior and posterior regions are golden-brown. Unlike other species, the colour is a glossy bluish-green on the neck mid-body (mesonotum) and yellow-brown on anterior legs (which are typically black in other species). The margin of the mesonotum is lined in black. The femora is carinae blue, while the spines black. Tibiae and tarsomeres are pinkish-brown. Females are light brown to dull green. The neck region is light bluish-green. The eggs are golden-brown, and shaped like an oval bullet with a terminal button (operculum and capitalum). The egg is 5.2 mm long, 2.7 mm wide, and 3.7 mm high. The newly hatched nymphs are green in colour, and measure 20–25 mm long. The mid-body region is darker with spots of white marks.
