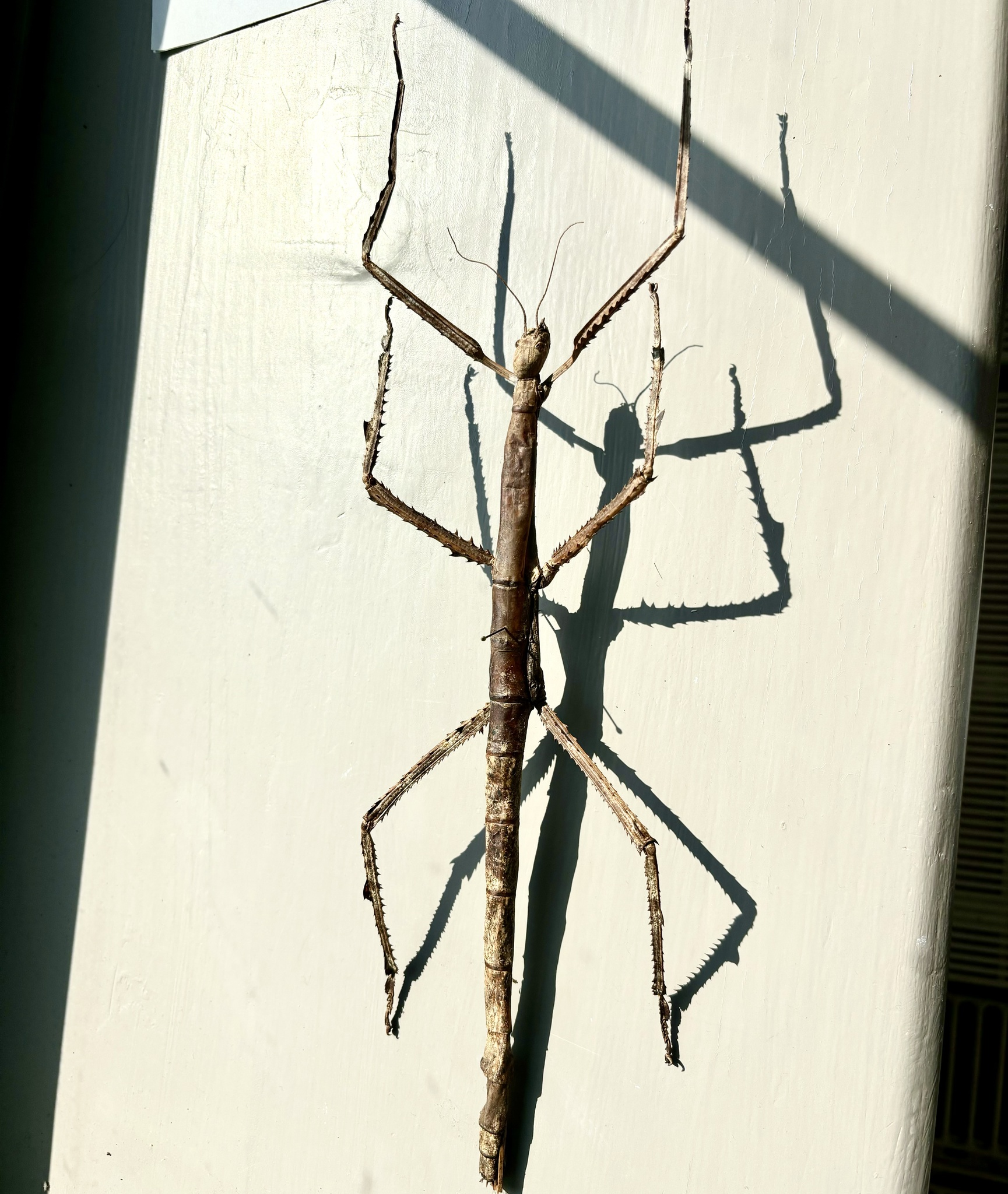

Scientific classification
- Kingdom: Animalia
- Phylum: Arthropoda
- Clade: Pancrustacea
- Class: Insecta
- Order: Phasmatodea
- Family: Phasmatidae
- Subfamily: Clitumninae
- Tribe: Pharnaciini
- Genus: Tirachoidea
- Species: T. westwoodii

Binomial name
- Tirachoidea westwoodii (Wood-Mason, 1875)

Synonyms
- Pharnacia westwoodi (Wood-Mason, 1875); Phibalosoma westwoodii Wood-Mason, 1875

= Tirachoidea westwoodii =

Species of stick insect

Tirachoidea westwoodii is a species of stick insect in the order Phasmatodea. It is found in India, Myanmar, Thailand and Vietnam. The eggs of the stick insect are spheric, ca. 5 mm in length and have a three-lobed micropylar plate. The chorion of the eggs are hard to cut and consist of the three layers mineralized with calcium carbonate and calcium oxalate.
