= Adiestramima =

Scientific classification
- Domain: Eukaryota
- Kingdom: Animalia
- Phylum: Arthropoda
- Class: Insecta
- Order: Orthoptera
- Suborder: Ensifera
- Family: Rhaphidophoridae
- Tribe: Diestramimini
- Genus: Adiestramima; Gorochov, 1998

Genus of cricket-like animals

Adiestramima is a genus of cave or camel crickets in the subfamily Aemodogryllinae and tribe Diestramimini. Originating in Asia, species have been found in the Indo-China region, mostly Vietnam.

== Species ==
The Orthoptera Species File lists:

subgenus Adiestramima Gorochov, 1998

- Adiestramima bicolor (Gorochov, 2002
- Adiestramima citrea (Gorochov, 1992
- Adiestramima multa (Gorochov, 1994) - type species (as Diestramima multa Gorochov)
- Adiestramima originalis Gorochov & Storozhenko, 2019
- Adiestramima proxima (Gorochov, 1994)

subgenus Hamatotettix Gorochov & Storozhenko, 2019

- Adiestramima adunca Gorochov & Storozhenko, 2015
- Adiestramima bella Gorochov & Storozhenko, 2015
- Adiestramima elongata Gorochov & Storozhenko, 2015

subgenus Ulterotettix Gorochov & Storozhenko, 2019

- Adiestramima modesta (Gorochov, 1992)
- Adiestramima perfecta Gorochov, 2002
