= Fansipaniana fansipana =

Scientific classification
- Kingdom: Animalia
- Phylum: Arthropoda
- Class: Insecta
- Order: Lepidoptera
- Family: Tortricidae
- Genus: Fansipaniana
- Species: F. fansipana

Binomial name
- Fansipaniana fansipana Razowski, 2009

Species of moths

Fansipaniana fansipana is a species of moths belonging to the tribe Olethreutini of the family Tortricidae. Both species recorded from National parks of Vietnam, in this case, the Fansipan mountain area.

== Description ==
The wingspan of F. fansipana is about 14 mm for males and 19 mm for females. The ground colour of the forewings of the males is greyish cream densely dotted with rust, but paler near the tornus. In females, the ground colour is suffused rust except for the postmedian area, where it forms a cream coloured rounded blotch followed by blackish suffusion marked with minute refractive dots arranged in two rows. The hindwings are grey in both sexes, but darker in females.
