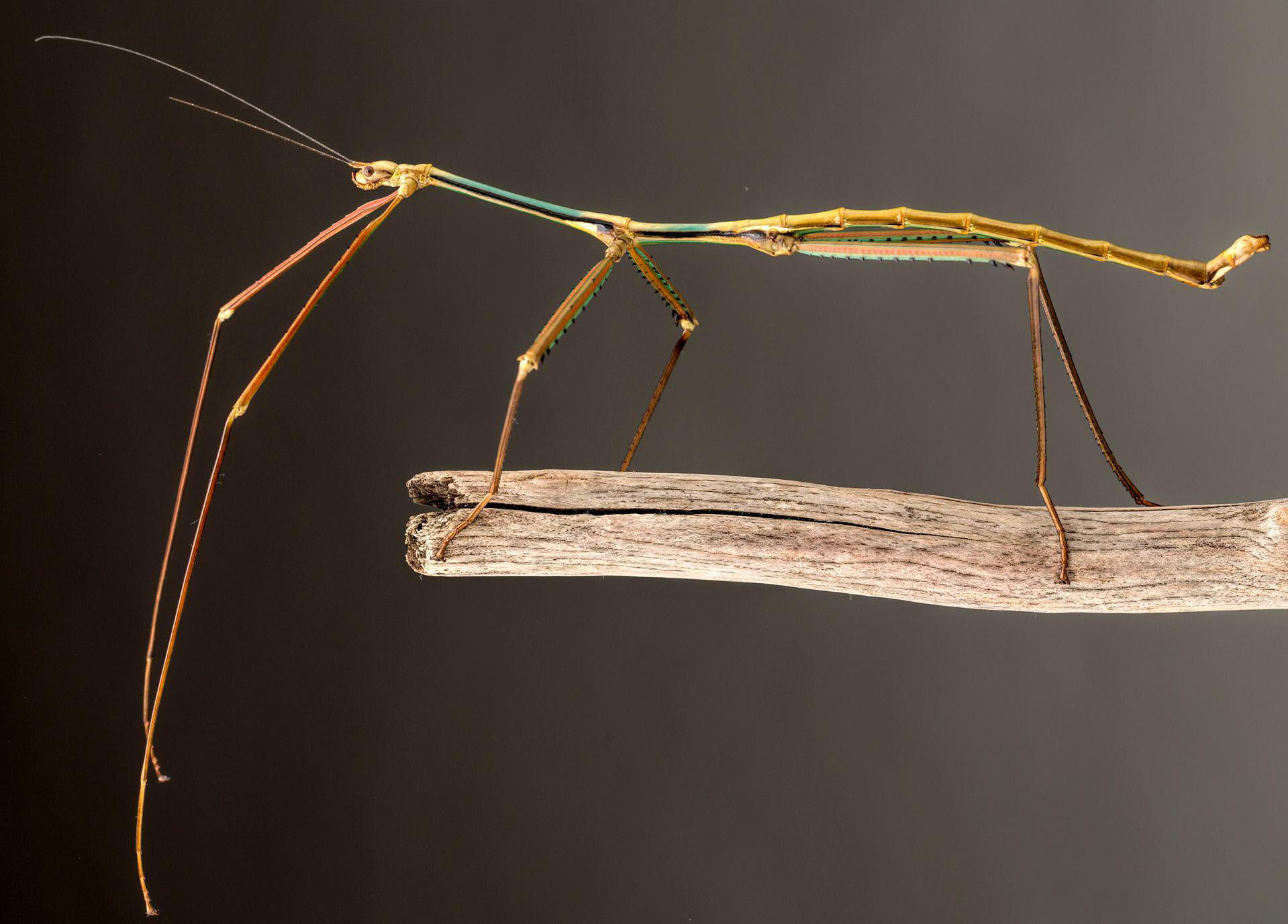
- Neophryganistria tamdaoensis male

Scientific classification
- Kingdom: Animalia
- Phylum: Arthropoda
- Class: Insecta
- Order: Phasmatodea
- Family: Phasmatidae
- Subfamily: Clitumninae
- Tribe: Pharnaciini
- Genus: Neophryganistria; Ho, 2023

= Neophryganistria =

Genus of stick insects

Neophryganistria is a genus of Asian stick insects in the tribe Pharnaciini, erected by Wai Chun George Ho in 2023. Species, several of which were previously placed in the related genus Phryganistria, have been recorded from central to southern China and Indochina.

== Description ==
As with other genera in the tribe Pharnaciini, Neophryganistria stick insects are notable for their great length. The second-longest recorded insect in the world may be Neophryganistria heusii yentuensis, with a total length of up to 520 millimetres (20 in) and a body length up to 320 millimetres (13 in). Another, Neophryganistria tamdaoensis was selected in 2015 by the International Institute for Species Exploration as one of the "Top 10 New Species" for new species discovered in 2014.

== Species ==
The Phasmida Species File includes:

1. Neophryganistria fruhstorferi (Brunner von Wattenwyl, 1907)
2. Neophryganistria grandis (Rehn, 1906)
3. Neophryganistria guangdongensis Ho, 2023 - type species
4. Neophryganistria guangxiensis (Chen & He, 2008)
5. Neophryganistria heusii (Hennemann & Conle, 1997) - 3 subspecies:
  1. N. heusii damingshanensis Ho, 2023
  2. N. heusii heusii Hennemann & Conle, 1997
  3. N. heusii yentuensis J. Bresseel & J Constant, 2014
6. Neophryganistria jinpingensis Ho, 2023
7. Neophryganistria longzhouensis (Chen & He, 2008)
8. Neophryganistria tamdaoensis (Bresseel & Constant, 2014)
9. Neophryganistria yunnanensis Ho, 2023
