= Megadiestramima =

Scientific classification
- Domain: Eukaryota
- Kingdom: Animalia
- Phylum: Arthropoda
- Class: Insecta
- Order: Orthoptera
- Suborder: Ensifera
- Family: Rhaphidophoridae
- Tribe: Diestramimini
- Genus: Megadiestramima; Storozhenko & Gorochov, 1992

Genus of cricket-like animals

Megadiestramima is a genus of cave or camel crickets in the subfamily Aemodogryllinae and tribe Diestramimini. Originating in Asia, species have been found in the Indo-China region.

== Species ==
The Orthoptera Species File lists:

subgenus Leodiestramima Storozhenko, 2009

- Megadiestramima exculta Gorochov, 1998
- Megadiestramima lecta Gorochov, 1998

subgenus Megadiestramima Storozhenko & Gorochov, 1992

- Megadiestramima abramovi Gorochov & Storozhenko, 2019
- Megadiestramima bilobata Gorochov & Storozhenko, 2019
- Megadiestramima borealis Gorochov & Storozhenko, 2019
- Megadiestramima centralis Gorochov & Storozhenko, 2019
- Megadiestramima darevskyi Gorochov, 1998
- Megadiestramima extensa Gorochov, 1998
- Megadiestramima intermedia Storozhenko & Gorochov, 1992 – type species
- Megadiestramima vera Gorochov, 2002

subgenus Neodiestramima Gorochov & Storozhenko, 2019

- Megadiestramima brevispina Gorochov & Storozhenko, 2019
- Megadiestramima orlovi Gorochov, 1994
