= Tachycines bifurcatus =

Scientific classification
- Domain: Eukaryota
- Kingdom: Animalia
- Phylum: Arthropoda
- Class: Insecta
- Order: Orthoptera
- Suborder: Ensifera
- Family: Rhaphidophoridae
- Genus: Tachycines
- Subgenus: Gymnaeta
- Species: T. bifurcatus

Binomial name
- Tachycines bifurcatus (Gorochov, 2010)

Synonyms
- Diestrammena bifurcata

Species of cricket-like animal

Tachycines (Gymnaeta) bifurcatus is a species of camel cricket in the Aemodogryllinae subfamily. This species was first described in 2010 by Gorochov, under its synonym Diestrammena bifurcata.
