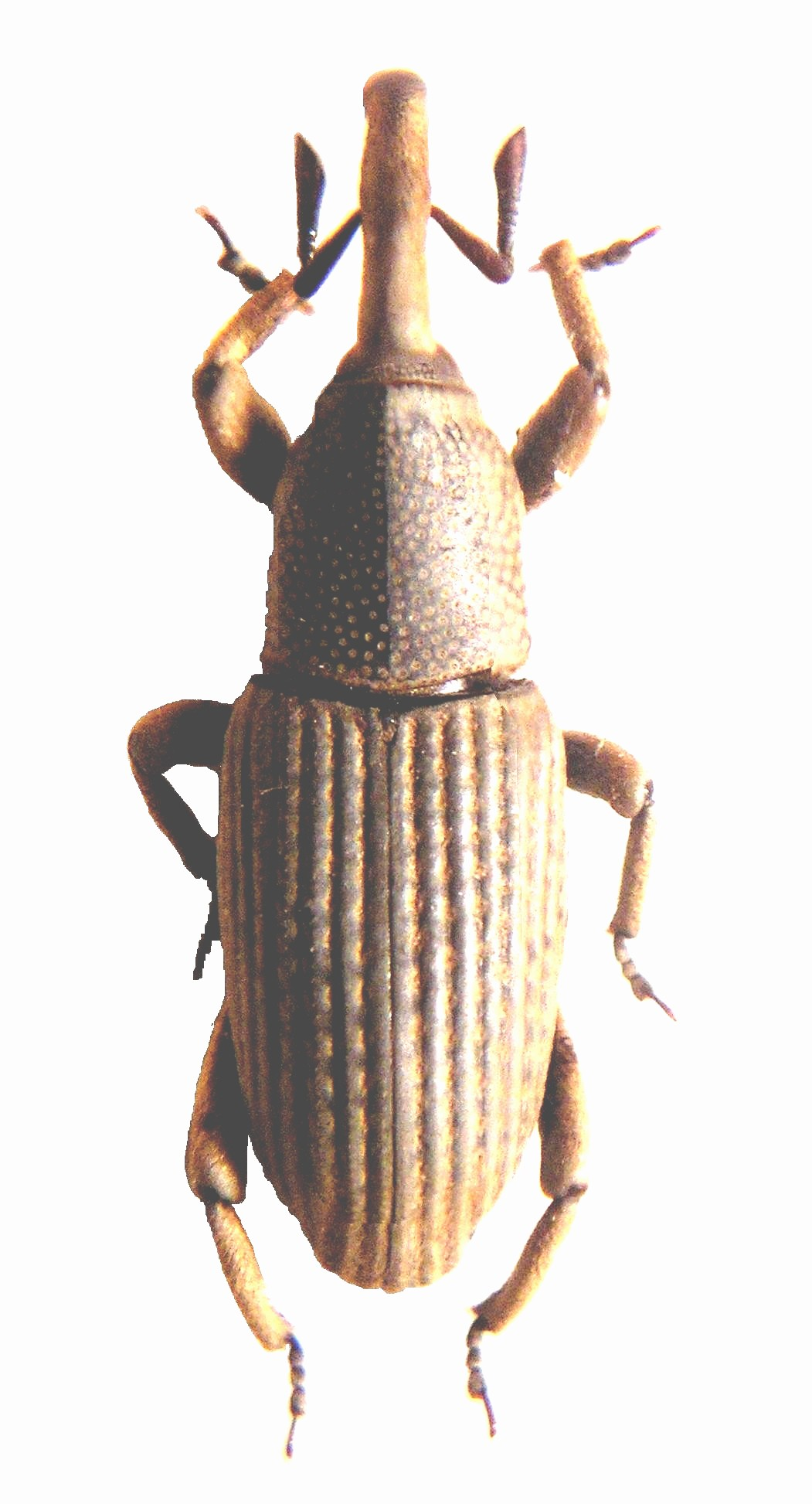
- Stromboscerus ?schuppeli

Scientific classification
- Kingdom: Animalia
- Phylum: Arthropoda
- Clade: Pancrustacea
- Class: Insecta
- Order: Coleoptera
- Suborder: Polyphaga
- Infraorder: Cucujiformia
- Family: Curculionidae
- Tribe: Stromboscerini
- Genus: Stromboscerus; Schönherr, 1838

= Stromboscerus =

Genus of beetles

Stromboscerus is a genus of the weevil subfamily Dryophthorinae. Two species of this genus are distributed in Madagascar.
