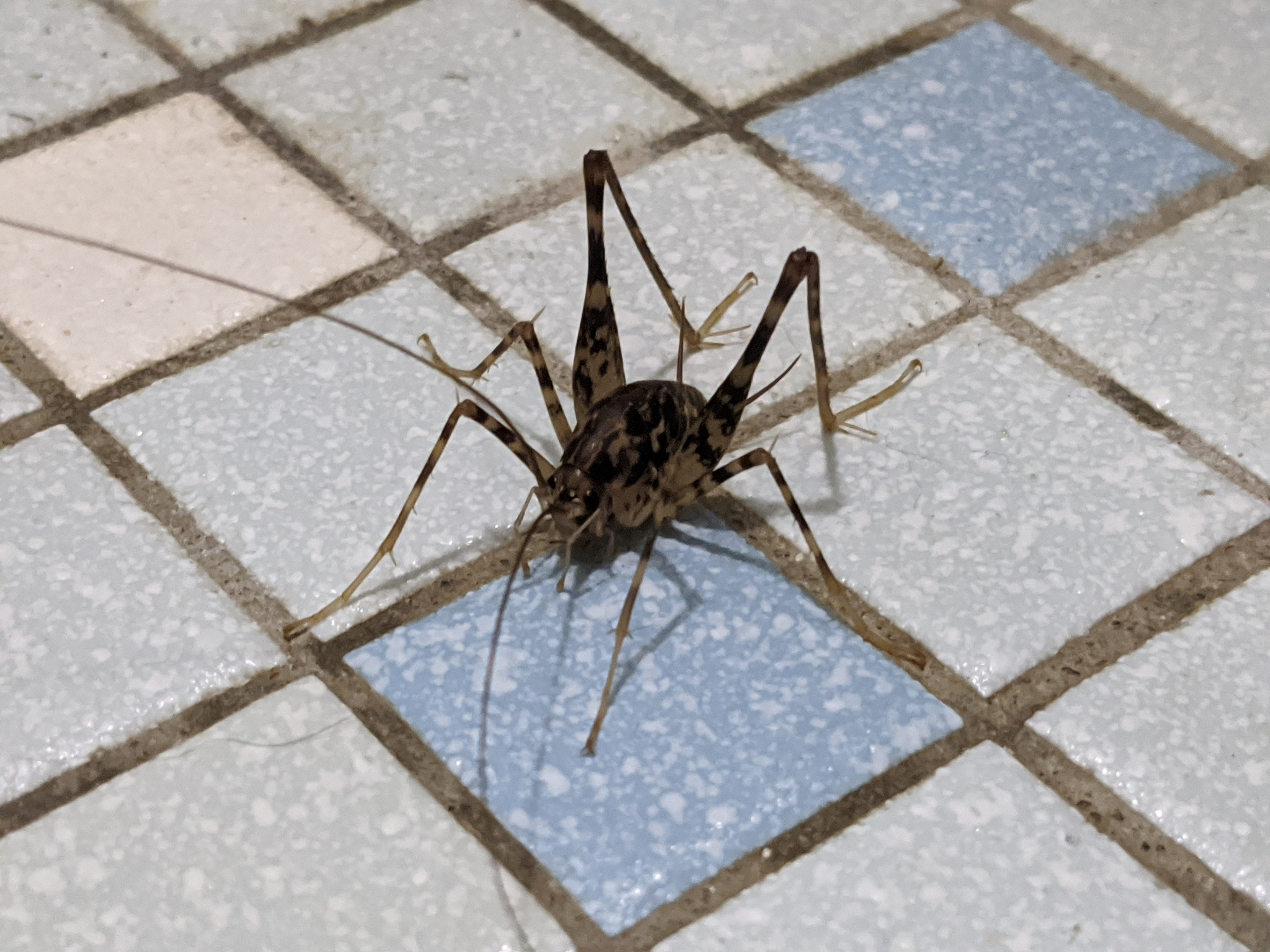

Scientific classification
- Kingdom: Animalia
- Phylum: Arthropoda
- Clade: Pancrustacea
- Class: Insecta
- Order: Orthoptera
- Suborder: Ensifera
- Family: Rhaphidophoridae
- Genus: Diestrammena
- Species: D. japanica

Binomial name
- Diestrammena japanica Blatchley, 1920

Synonyms
- Diestrammena naganoensis Mori, 1987; Diestrammena marmorata (Haan, 1843); Locusta (Rhaphidophorus) marmorata Haan, 1843 – name preoccupied; Diestrammena japonica Blatchley, 1920

= Diestrammena japanica =

Species of cricket native to Japan

The Japanese camel cricket, Diestrammena japanica, is a species of camel cricket native to Japan. Outside of its native range, specifically in the eastern United States, it is recognized as an invasive species.
