= Fansipaniana =

Scientific classification
- Kingdom: Animalia
- Phylum: Arthropoda
- Class: Insecta
- Order: Lepidoptera
- Family: Tortricidae
- Subfamily: Olethreutinae
- Tribe: Olethreutini
- Genus: Fansipaniana; Razowski, 2009

Type species
- Fansipaniana fansipana

Genus of moths

Fansipaniana is a genus of moths belonging to the tribe Olethreutini of the family Tortricidae. It contains two species recorded from National parks of Vietnam.

== Species ==
1. Fansipaniana fansipana Razowski, 2009
2. Fansipaniana tamdaoensis Heppner & Bae, 2016 (Tam Đảo National Park)

== Etymology ==
The name of both the genus and species refers to type locality.

== See also ==
- List of Tortricidae genera
