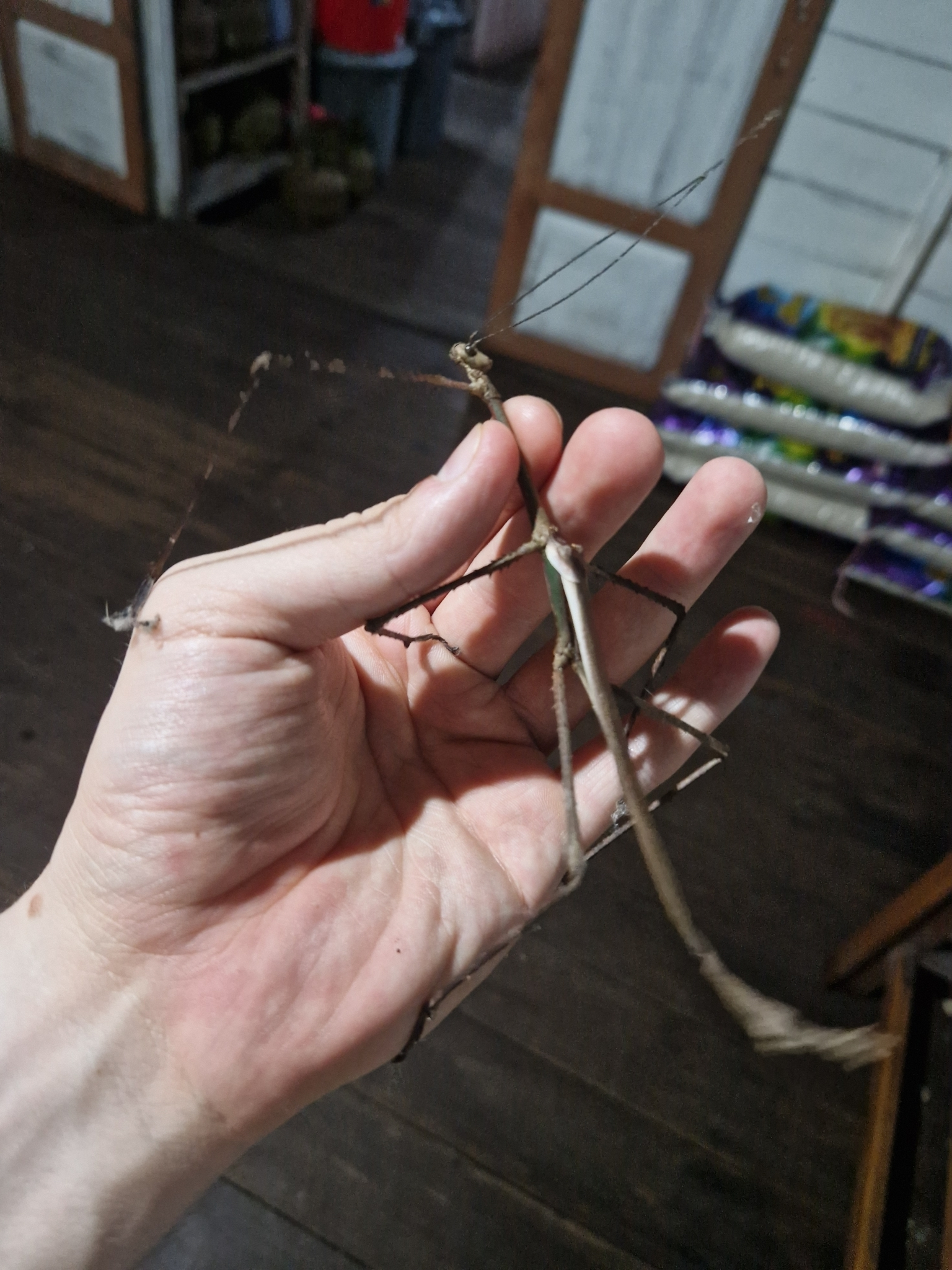
- Tirachoidea herberti

Scientific classification
- Kingdom: Animalia
- Phylum: Arthropoda
- Clade: Pancrustacea
- Class: Insecta
- Order: Phasmatodea
- Infraorder: Anareolatae
- Family: Phasmatidae
- Subfamily: Clitumninae
- Tribe: Pharnaciini
- Genus: Tirachoidea; Brunner von Wattenwyl, 1893

= Tirachoidea =

Genus of stick insects

Tirachoidea is an Asian genus of stick insects in the family Phasmatidae and tribe Pharnaciini. Species have a known distribution from India, Indochina and West Malesia.

== Species ==
Tirachoidea includes the following species:

1. Tirachoidea biceps (Redtenbacher, 1908)
2. Tirachoidea cantori (Westwood, 1859)
  type species (as Phibalosoma cantori Westwood)
3. Tirachoidea chiniensis (Seow-Choen, 1998)
4. Tirachoidea herberti Hennemann & Conle, 2008
5. Tirachoidea inversa (Brunner von Wattenwyl, 1907)
6. Tirachoidea jianfenglingensis (Bi, 1994)
7. Tirachoidea siamensis Hennemann & Conle, 2008
8. Tirachoidea westwoodii (Wood-Mason, 1875)
