= Baculonistria =

Scientific classification
- Domain: Eukaryota
- Kingdom: Animalia
- Phylum: Arthropoda
- Class: Insecta
- Order: Phasmatodea
- Family: Phasmatidae
- Tribe: Pharnaciini
- Genus: Baculonistria; Hennemann & Conle, 2008

Genus of insects

Baculonistria is a genus of stick insects belonging to the family Phasmatidae, with records from China.

== Species ==
Baculonistria includes the following species:

1. Baculonistria alba (Chen & He, 1990) - type species
2. Baculonistria chinensis (Brunner von Wattenwyl, 1907)
3. Baculonistria magna (Brunner von Wattenwyl, 1907)
