= Pavieasia =

Scientific classification
- Kingdom: Plantae
- Clade: Tracheophytes
- Clade: Angiosperms
- Clade: Eudicots
- Clade: Rosids
- Order: Sapindales
- Family: Sapindaceae
- Subfamily: Sapindoideae
- Genus: Pavieasia; Pierre, 1895

Genus of trees

Pavieasia is a small genus of tree species in the family Sapindaceae. Records are mostly from southern China and Vietnam.

== Species ==
Plants of the World Online lists:

1. Pavieasia anamensis - type species
2. Pavieasia kwangsiensis
