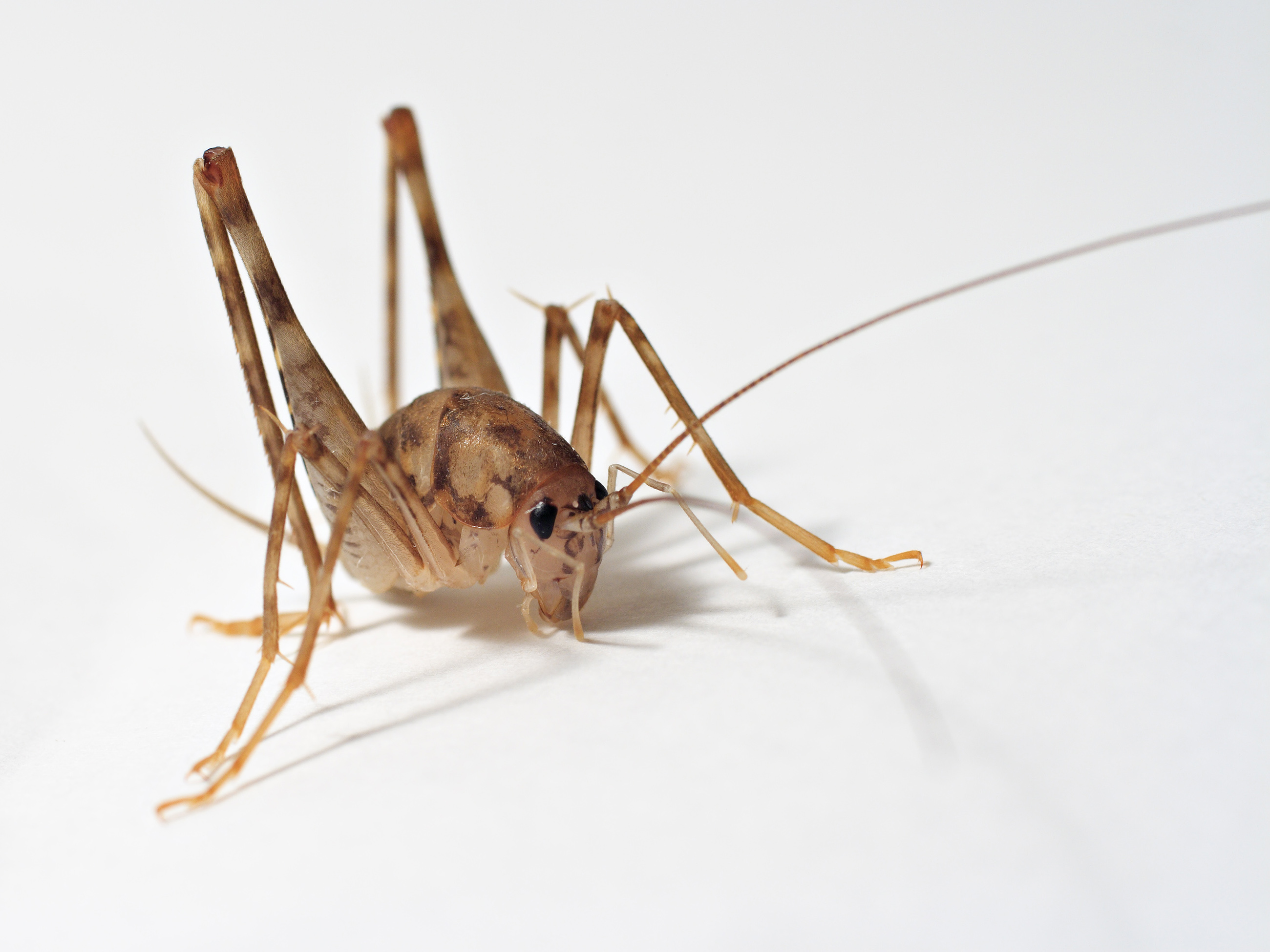
- T. asynamorus

Scientific classification
- Kingdom: Animalia
- Phylum: Arthropoda
- Clade: Pancrustacea
- Class: Insecta
- Order: Orthoptera
- Suborder: Ensifera
- Family: Rhaphidophoridae
- Tribe: Aemodogryllini
- Genus: Tachycines; Adelung, 1902

= Tachycines =

Genus of cricket-like animals

Tachycines is a genus of camel crickets in the subfamily Aemodogryllinae and tribe Aemodogryllini. Some authorities had placed the type species, T. asynamorus, in the genus Diestrammena, but recent papers returned this to the subgenus Tachycines (Tachycines), with a substantial number of new species recently described.

Species have a discontinuous distribution in Europe and eastern Asia (China, Korea, Japan), with species in subgenus Gymnaeta also found Indo-China and the Philippines. European records appear to refer to Tachycines asynamorus: the cosmopolitan 'greenhouse camel cricket', which has also spread to the USA.

== Species ==
The Orthoptera Species File lists:
subgenus Gymnaeta Adelung, 1902

- Tachycines adelungi Chopard, 1921
- Tachycines altimontanus (Gorochov, 2010)
- Tachycines ater Li, Feng & Luo, 2021
- Tachycines belousovi (Gorochov, 2010)
- Tachycines beresowskii (Adelung, 1902)
- Tachycines bifolius Zhu, Chen & Shi, 2020
- Tachycines bifurcatus (Gorochov, 2010)
- Tachycines borutzkyi (Gorochov, 1994)
- Tachycines brevicaudus Karny, 1934
- Tachycines bruneri Karny, 1934
- Tachycines caudatus (Gorochov, Rampini & Di Russo, 2006)
- Tachycines cavernus (Jaio, Niu, Liu, Lei & Bi, 2008)
- Tachycines chenhui (Rampini & Di Russo, 2008)
- Tachycines coomani Chopard, 1929
- Tachycines cuenoti Chopard, 1929
- Tachycines dentatus Li, Feng & Luo, 2021
- Tachycines dianxicus Qin, Liu & Li, 2019
- Tachycines dispar Qin, Liu & Li, 2019
- Tachycines fallax (Zhang & Liu, 2009)
- Tachycines femoratus (Zhang & Liu, 2009)
- Tachycines ferecaecus (Gorochov, Rampini & Di Russo, 2006)
- Tachycines gansu (Gorochov, 2010)
- Tachycines gonggashanicus (Zhang & Liu, 2009)
- Tachycines kabaki (Gorochov, 2010)
- Tachycines lalinus Feng, Huang & Luo, 2019
- Tachycines latellai (Rampini & Di Russo, 2008)
- Tachycines latiliconcavus Zhu, Chen & Shi, 2020
- Tachycines latus (Zhang & Liu, 2009)
- Tachycines liboensis Zhu, Chen & Shi, 2020
- Tachycines lii Qin, Liu & Li, 2019
- Tachycines longicaudus Karny, 1934
- Tachycines longilaminus (Zhang & Liu, 2009)
- Tachycines lushuicus Qin, Liu & Li, 2019
- Tachycines maoershanensis Qin, Liu & Li, 2019
- Tachycines nocturnus (Gorochov, 1992)
- Tachycines nulliscleritus Zhu, Chen & Shi, 2020
- Tachycines omninocaecus (Gorochov, Rampini & Di Russo, 2006)
- Tachycines pallidus Qin, Liu & Li, 2019
- Tachycines papilious Zhu & Shi, 2021
- Tachycines paradoxus Zhu, Chen & Shi, 2020
- Tachycines parvus Qin, Liu & Li, 2019
- Tachycines pentagona Li, Feng & Luo, 2021
- Tachycines plumiopedella Li, Feng & Luo, 2021
- Tachycines proximus (Gorochov, Rampini & Di Russo, 2006)
- Tachycines quadratus Zhu & Shi, 2021
- Tachycines racovitzai Chopard, 1916
- Tachycines roundatus (Zhang & Liu, 2009)
- Tachycines semicrenatus (Gorochov, Rampini & Di Russo, 2006)
- Tachycines shiziensis Zhu & Shi, 2021
- Tachycines shuangcha Feng, Huang & Luo, 2020
- Tachycines sichuanus (Gorochov, 2010)
- Tachycines solida (Gorochov, Rampini & Di Russo, 2006)
- Tachycines sonlaensis (Gorochov, 1990)
- Tachycines sparsispinus Zhu & Shi, 2021
- Tachycines taenus Zhu, Chen & Shi, 2020
- Tachycines tongrenus Feng, Huang & Luo, 2020
- Tachycines tonkinensis Chopard, 1929
- Tachycines trapezialis Zhou & Yang, 2020
- Tachycines tuberus Zhu, Chen & Shi, 2020
- Tachycines umbellus Zhu, Chen & Shi, 2020
- Tachycines verus Qin, Liu & Li, 2019
- Tachycines vicinus Qin, Liu & Li, 2019
- Tachycines wuyishanicus (Zhang & Liu, 2009)
- Tachycines yueyangensis Qin, Liu & Li, 2019
- Tachycines zaoshu Feng, Huang & Luo, 2020
- Tachycines zorzini (Rampini & Di Russo, 2008)

subgenus Tachycines Adelung, 1902

- Tachycines asynamorus Adelung, 1902 – type species
- Tachycines baiyunjianensis Qin, Wang, Liu & Li, 2018
- Tachycines bilobatus Qin, Wang, Liu & Li, 2018
- Tachycines borealis (Cui & Liu, 2013)
- Tachycines chinensis Storozhenko, 1990
- Tachycines coreanus Yamasaki, 1969
- Tachycines danpingensis Zhou, Ou, Shi, Long, Zhang & Zheng, 2021
- Tachycines denticulatus (Gorochov, 2010)
- Tachycines huaxi Huang & Luo, 2019
- Tachycines incisus Qin, Wang, Liu & Li, 2018
- Tachycines maximus Qin, Wang, Liu & Li, 2018
- Tachycines meditationis Würmli, 1973
- Tachycines multispinosus Qin, Wang, Liu & Li, 2018
- Tachycines rammei Karny, 1926
- Tachycines sichuanensis Qin, Wang, Liu & Li, 2018
- Tachycines svenhedini Karny, 1934
- Tachycines transversus Qin, Wang, Liu & Li, 2018
- Tachycines trilobatus Qin, Wang, Liu & Li, 2018
- Tachycines validus Chopard, 1921
- Tachycines xiai Qin, Wang, Liu & Li, 2018
- Tachycines yanlingensis Qin, Wang, Liu & Li, 2018

subgenus not determined

- Tachycines karnyi Qin, Wang, Liu & Li, 2018
