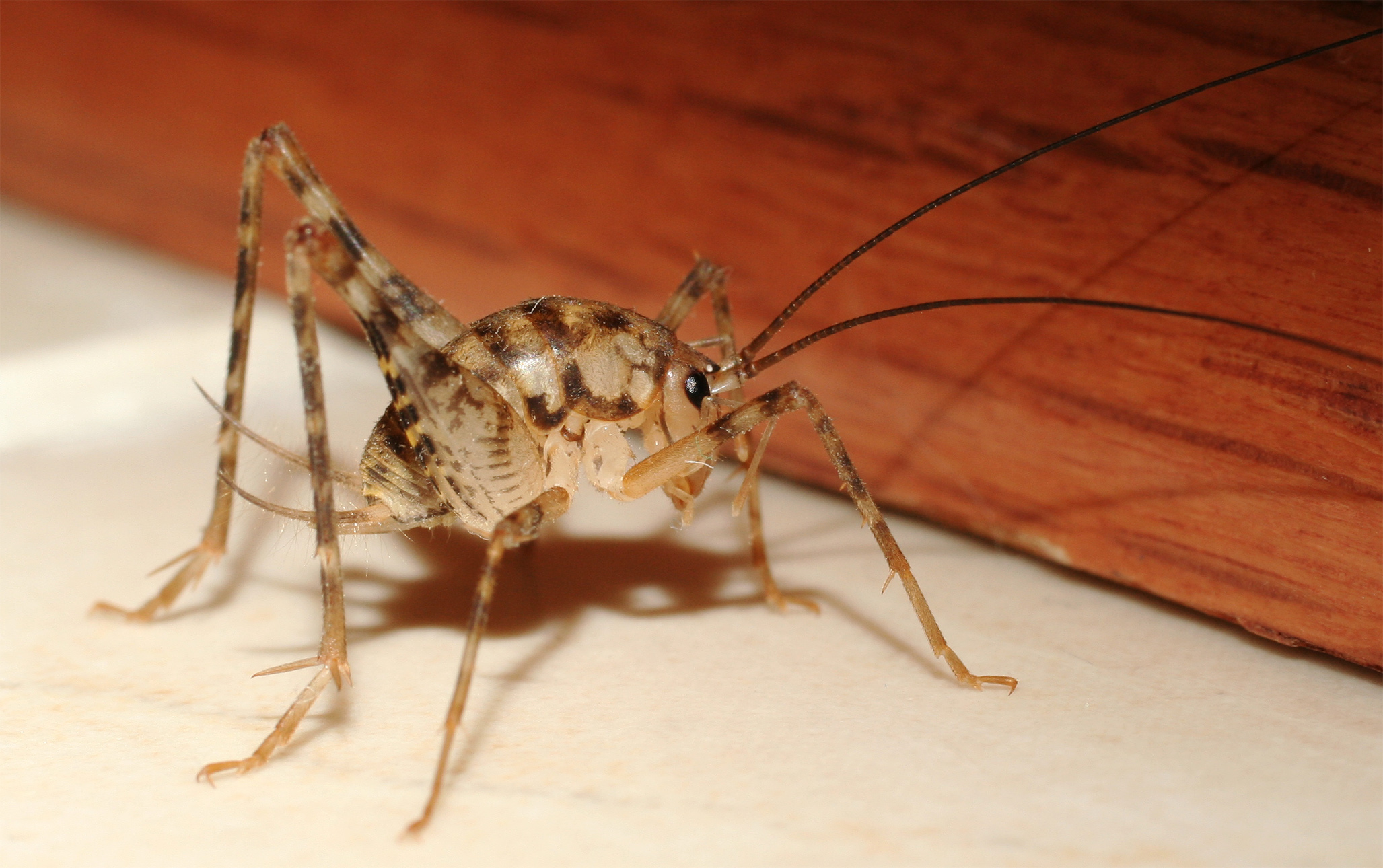
- Atachycines apicalis

Scientific classification
- Kingdom: Animalia
- Phylum: Arthropoda
- Clade: Pancrustacea
- Class: Insecta
- Order: Orthoptera
- Suborder: Ensifera
- Family: Rhaphidophoridae
- Subfamily: Aemodogryllinae
- Genus: Atachycines; Furukawa, 1933

= Atachycines =

Genus of cricket-like animals

Atachycines is a genus of cave or camel crickets in the subfamily Aemodogryllinae; the genus has not been assigned to any tribe. Originating in Asia, species have been recorded from Borneo, the Indochina region and Japan.

== Species ==
The Orthoptera Species File lists:

- Atachycines apicalis Brunner von Wattenwyl, 1888 – type species (as Diestrammena horazumi Furukawa = A. apicalis subsp. apicalis)
- Atachycines minuta Chopard, 1916
- Atachycines mjobergi Chopard, 1937
