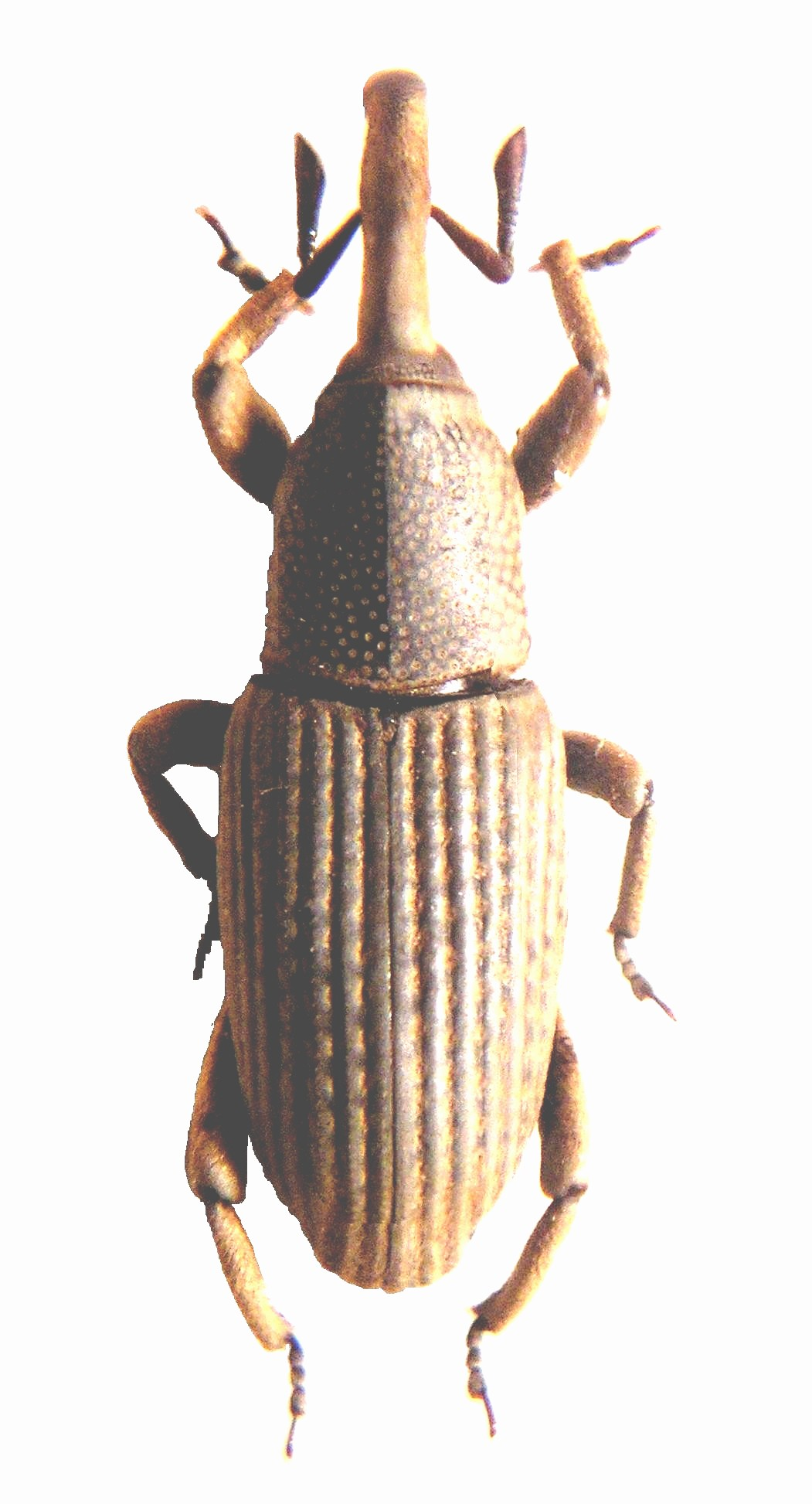
- Stromboscerus sp

Scientific classification
- Domain: Eukaryota
- Kingdom: Animalia
- Phylum: Arthropoda
- Class: Insecta
- Order: Coleoptera
- Suborder: Polyphaga
- Infraorder: Cucujiformia
- Family: Curculionidae
- Subfamily: Dryophthorinae
- Tribe: Stromboscerini

Genera
- Allaeotes Pascoe 1885; Besuchetiella Osella 1974; Dexipeus Pascoe 1885; Dryophthoroides Roelofs 1879; Nephius Pascoe 1885; Orthosinus Motschulsky 1863; Parasynnommatus Voss 1956; Stromboscerus Schönherr 1838; Synommatoides Morimoto 1978; Synommatus Wollaston 1873; Tasactes Faust 1894; Tetrasynommatus Morimoto 1985

= Stromboscerini =

Tribe of beetles

The insect tribe Stromboscerini is part of the weevil family Curculionidae, subfamily Dryophthorinae. It is a small and little-known weevil group. Alonso-Zarazaga & Lyal (1999) treated it as a subfamily (Stromboscerinae Lacordaire, 1866).

All weevils of this tribe have the antennal club with an asymmetrical apex. The winged species of the tribe have the eyes contiguous beneath the head, which makes them "Cyclops"-like. This characteristic is seen in some other Dryophthorinae. All other weevils with contiguous eyes have them connected at the upper part of the head, as in Zygops (Conoderinae) or some Rhamphini (Curculioninae).
