= Pavieasia anamensis =

Scientific classification
- Kingdom: Plantae
- Clade: Tracheophytes
- Clade: Angiosperms
- Clade: Eudicots
- Clade: Rosids
- Order: Sapindales
- Family: Sapindaceae
- Subfamily: Sapindoideae
- Genus: Pavieasia
- Species: P. anamensis

Binomial name
- Pavieasia anamensis Pierre, 1894

Synonyms
- Guioa krempfii Gagnep.; Pavieasia yunnanensis H.S.Lo, Sapindus anamensis Pierre ex Lecomte Sapindus anamensis Pierre

Species of tree

Pavieasia anamensis is an Asian tree species in the family Sapindaceae. It is found in Vietnam where it may be called trường nhãn; no subspecies are listed in the Catalogue of Life.
