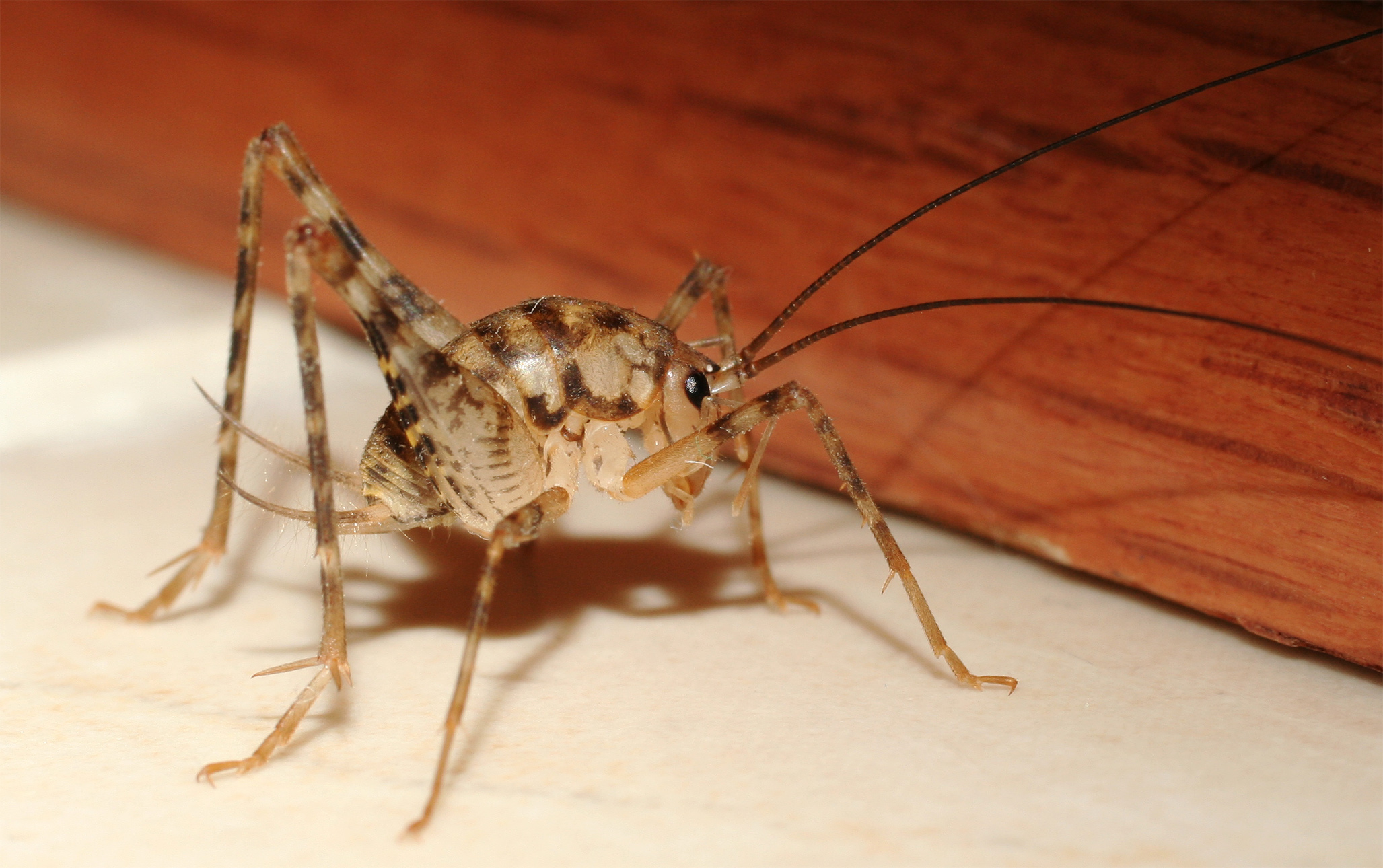
- Atachycines apicalis

Scientific classification
- Domain: Eukaryota
- Kingdom: Animalia
- Phylum: Arthropoda
- Class: Insecta
- Order: Orthoptera
- Suborder: Ensifera
- Family: Rhaphidophoridae
- Subfamily: Aemodogryllinae; Jacobson, 1905

= Aemodogryllinae =

Subfamily of cricket-like animals

The Orthopteran subfamily Aemodogryllinae contains about sixteen genera of camel crickets. It was named after Aemodogryllus Adelung, 1902 - which is now considered a subgenus of Diestrammena.

Species can be found in Europe and Asia (Korea, Indo-China, Russia, China), although the greenhouse camel cricket is cosmopolitan and could be described as an invasive species.

== Tribes and Genera ==
The Orthoptera Species File includes two tribes and lists:

=== Aemodogryllini ===
Auth. Jacobson, 1905 - Europe, Asia (Korea, Indochina, Russia, China)

1. Diestrammena Brunner von Wattenwyl, 1888
2. Eutachycines Storozhenko, 1990
3. Gymnaetoides Qin, Liu & Li, 2017
4. Homotachycines Zhu & Shi, 2022
5. Megatachycines Zhu, Shi & Zhou, 2022
6. Microtachycines Gorochov, 1992
7. Paradiestrammena Chopard, 1919
8. Paratachycines Storozhenko, 1990
9. Pseudotachycines Qin, Liu & Li, 2017
10. Tachycines Adelung, 1902

=== Diestramimini ===
Auth. Gorochov, 1998 - India, southern China, Indo-China

1. Adiestramima Gorochov, 1998
2. Arboramima Zong, Qin & He, 2021
3. Diestramima Storozhenko, 1990
4. Gigantettix Gorochov, 1998
5. Megadiestramima Storozhenko & Gorochov, 1992
6. Mimadiestra Storozhenko & Dawwrueng, 2014
7. Tamdaotettix Gorochov, 1998

=== incertae sedis ===
1. Atachycines Furukawa, 1933 - Borneo, Indo-China, Japan
2. Neotachycines Sugimoto & Ichikawa, 2003 - Japan
