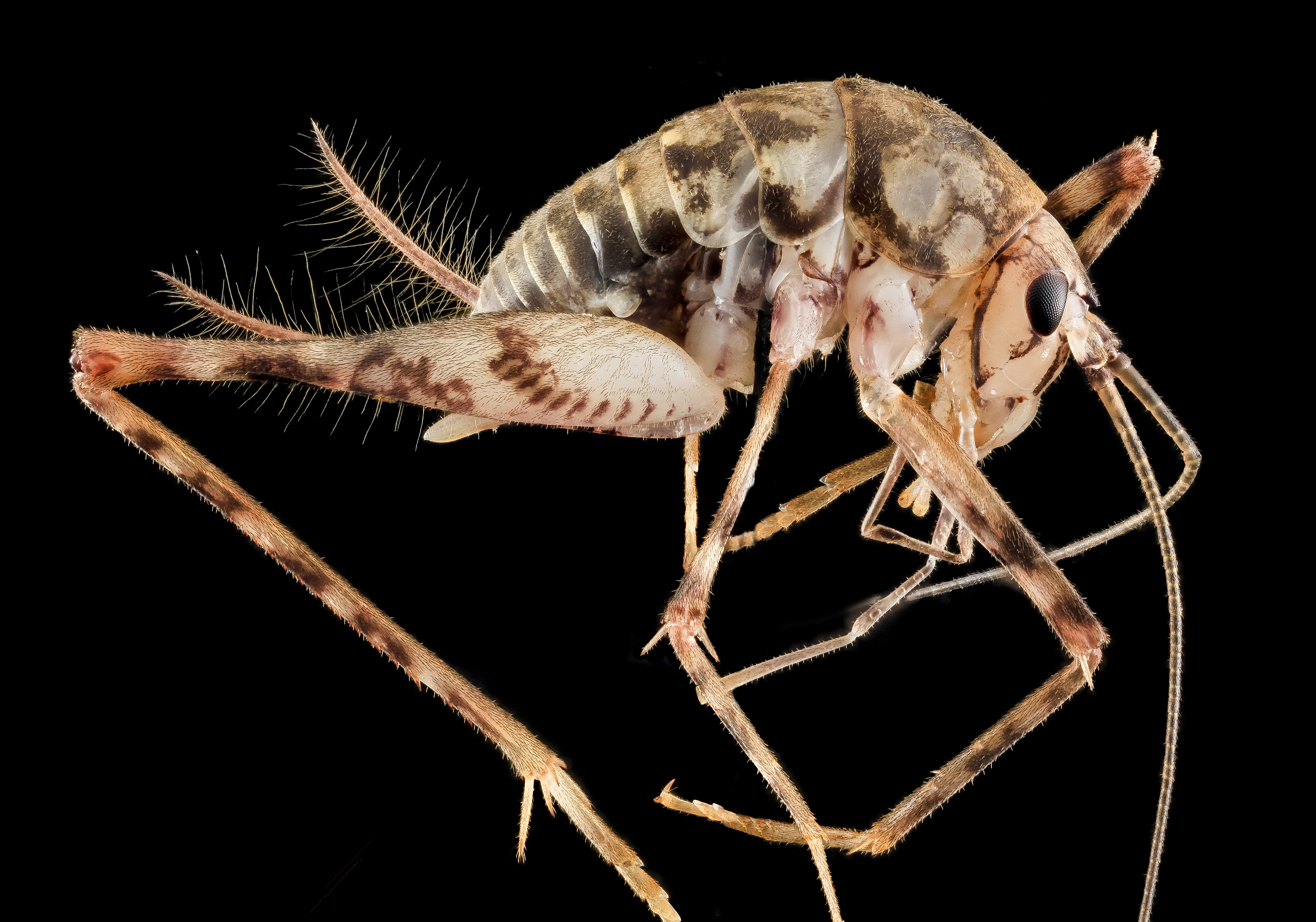
- Immature specimen

Scientific classification
- Kingdom: Animalia
- Phylum: Arthropoda
- Clade: Pancrustacea
- Class: Insecta
- Order: Orthoptera
- Suborder: Ensifera
- Family: Rhaphidophoridae
- Genus: Tachycines
- Subgenus: Tachycines
- Species: T. asynamorus

Binomial name
- Tachycines asynamorus Adelung, 1902

Synonyms
- Diestrammena asynamora (Adelung, 1902); Tachycines hoffmanni Karny, 1934; Tachycines minor Chopard, 1963

= Tachycines asynamorus =

Species of cricket-like animal

Tachycines asynamorus is a cave cricket and the type species of the genus Tachycines (Rhaphidophoridae). In English-speaking countries it is known as the greenhouse camel cricket or greenhouse stone cricket for its propensity for living in greenhouses. It was first described in 1902 by Russian entomologist Nikolai Adelung on the basis of specimens caught in the palm houses of St. Petersburg. Some authorities have placed this species in the genus Diestrammena, but it has now restored to its basonym.

The warmth-loving, tropical species was introduced worldwide by humans and today often occurs synanthropically in the vicinity of humans, especially in greenhouses. The animals are crepuscular and nocturnal. They feed carnivorously on various small insects as well as on plant material such as fruits, seeds, seedlings or young leaves and flowers.

== Description ==
Tachycines asynamorus is a medium-sized, apterous camel cricket. Its body length ranges from 11.3–14.6 mm (0.4–0.6 in). It has very long antennae, palps, and cerci. The female has a long, gently upcurved ovipositor, 10.7–12 mm (0.4–0.5 in) in length.

Their coloration is gray to yellow-brown or even reddish-brown ground color, with the abdomen being patterned with dark brown spots and stripes. The pronotum has a dark brown edge, the legs are dark and lightly ringed, this pattern is particularly visible on the hind legs. The antennae, palps, legs and cerci are conspicuously long. At 70 to 80 millimeters long, the antennae are about four times the length of the body, the cerci reach about 10 millimeters in both males and females and are flexible, hairy all around, and evenly tapered to the tip. The palps of the lower jaw are up to 15 millimeters long. Greenhouse camel crickets have no auditory openings and no simple eyes (ocelli), but their simple eyes are fully developed. It is thought that their long legs are an adaptation to their nocturnal lifestyle and are used as additional tactile organs. The cerci are also used for touching, but the males cannot grasp with them and therefore do not use them for mating. The tarsi on the fore and middle legs are only slightly shorter than the femora. There are two long, movable spines on the tip of the thighs of the middle pair of legs, and another outwardly directed spine on the front legs. The hind legs have long, double spines on the rounded shinbones.

== Similar species ==
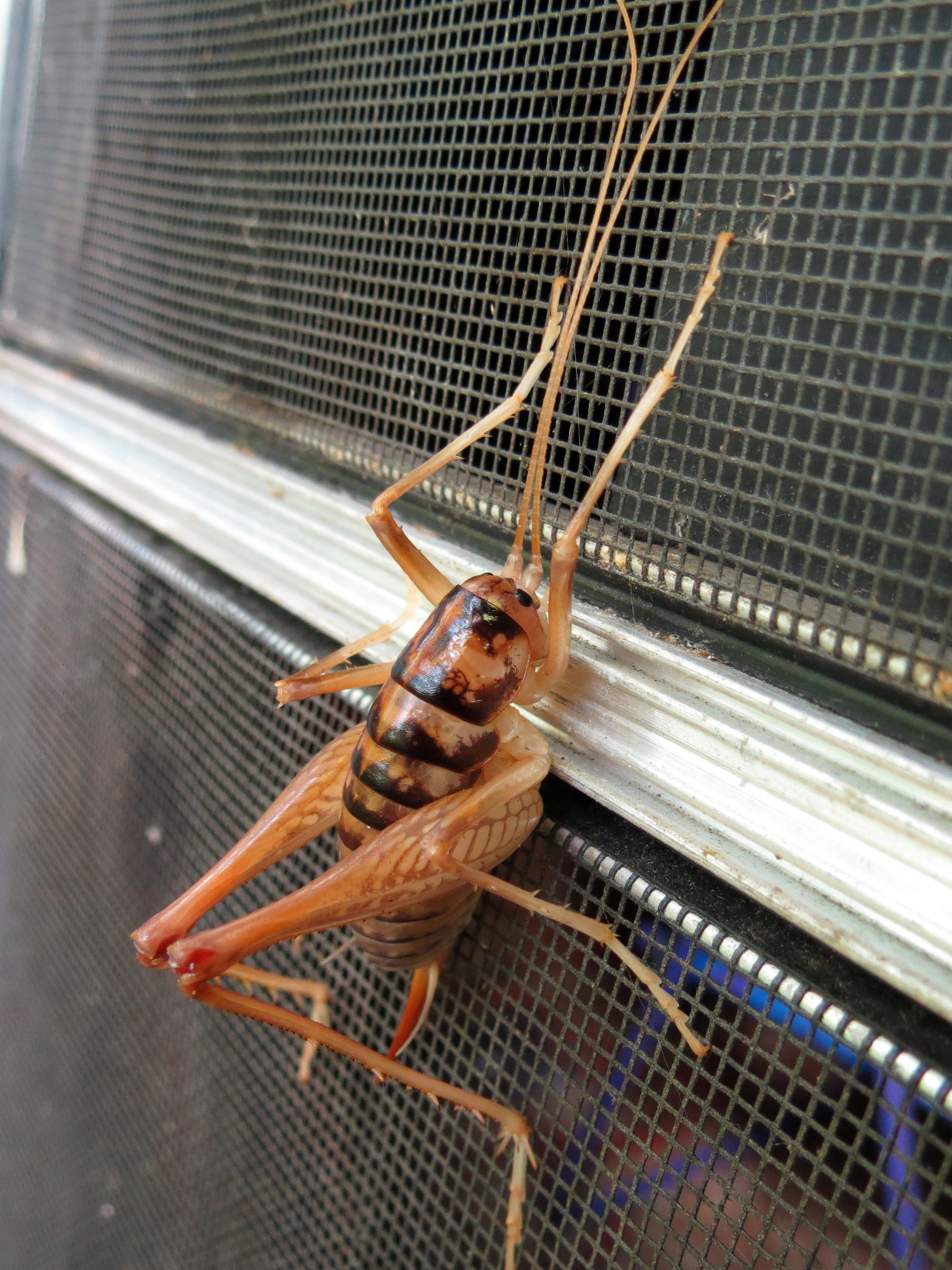
Female of T. asynamorus

The species can be confused with Kollar's cave cricket (Troglophilus cavicola), which occurs from south-eastern Switzerland via Italy (south to Lake Como) and southern Austria to Greece. The greenhouse camel cricket differs from Kollar's by its spination on the front and middle legs as well as by the evenly tapering ovipositor tube of the females directly after the thickened base. The ovipositor tube of Kollar's cave cricket is shorter and broader, especially the first third is clearly widened.

== Occurrence ==
It is native to Asia, including Korea, but has long been found especially in heated European greenhouses. It prefers moist and warm habitats that offer sufficient hiding places. It has been introduced worldwide by humans. In Europe, the species has only been found synanthropically in the vicinity of humans since the end of the 19th century. It has been recorded in the greenhouses of almost all botanical gardens in Europe as well as in zoos and nurseries, but is no longer as common as in botanical gardens due to targeted control, especially in the latter. The animals can also be found in warm cellars. In temperate latitudes, the species is only found outdoors during very hot summers. Due to its synanthropic lifestyle, the species occurs in a continuous succession of generations throughout the year.

People in the United States were asked to survey their homes for presence or absence of camel crickets such as those of this genus and return photographs and/or specimens to North Carolina State University for further research. Researchers including Rob Dunn have found that introduced greenhouse camel crickets were reported much more commonly than the native North American camel crickets of the genus Ceuthophilus.

== Ecology ==
The crickets are active at dusk and at night, avoid light and hide between boards and other objects, such as flower pots, during the day. They feed carnivorously on various small insects, such as aphids and dead insects, as well as on plant material such as fruit, seeds, seedlings or young leaves and flowers. They therefore cause damage in greenhouses, especially when they occur en masse. With their well-developed jumping muscles, greenhouse insects can jump up to 1.5 meters and 0.5 meters high. Even when males fight with each other, the jumping muscles are used to fend off rivals, which is particularly common when there are large populations in hiding places.

Originating in the caves of eastern Asia, it is omnivorous, sometimes carnivorous, or a scavenger of dead insects and other organic material.

=== Pairing ===
As with all members of the cave cricket family, these animals are unable to produce any vocalizations. During courtship, males use noiseless swinging movements to attract females. When mating, the male positions himself under the female from the front, allowing her to climb over him. The male possesses glands on his back, which the female licks. The spermatophore is then attached to the end of the female's abdomen, and the two animals are connected solely by this. After mating, the male dismounts from the female, who remains seated and begins to consume the spermatophore. The spermatophore has a well-developed spermatophylaxis, which is the furthest protrusion and is consumed first over the next one to two hours. Meanwhile, the ampulla containing the spermatozoa is safely discharged into the sexual opening and is only consumed thereafter.

=== Development ===
The females lay their eggs individually, mainly in the soil of flower pots, drilling their ovipositor vertically into the soil to a depth of 7 to 12 millimeters. One to 90 eggs are laid each night, up to 900 in total. These are two millimetres long and one millimetre wide. After laying, the pierced hole is closed again with the ovipositor. The larvae hatch after three to four months, but as the development of the animals is not synchronized, all stages of development can be observed at the same time. The larvae take around seven months to develop into the imago. During this time, around 10 molts take place. To do this, the larvae attach themselves to the hind legs in order to shed the larval skin. This is eaten after the moult, which lasts 15 to 20 minutes. After a further one to five hours, the new chitinous skin of the animals is hardened and colored.

== Conservation status ==
Due to its synanthropic lifestyle and common occurrence, the species is not considered endangered and is therefore not included in the Red Lists of endangered species in Europe.

== Synonyms ==
The following two synonyms are currently recognized;

- Tachycines meditationis (Würmli, 1973);
- Tachycines minor (Chopard, 1963).

== See also ==
- Pictures of Greenhouse Camel Crickets at bugguide.net
- Diestrammena asynamora at Orthoptera.ch
