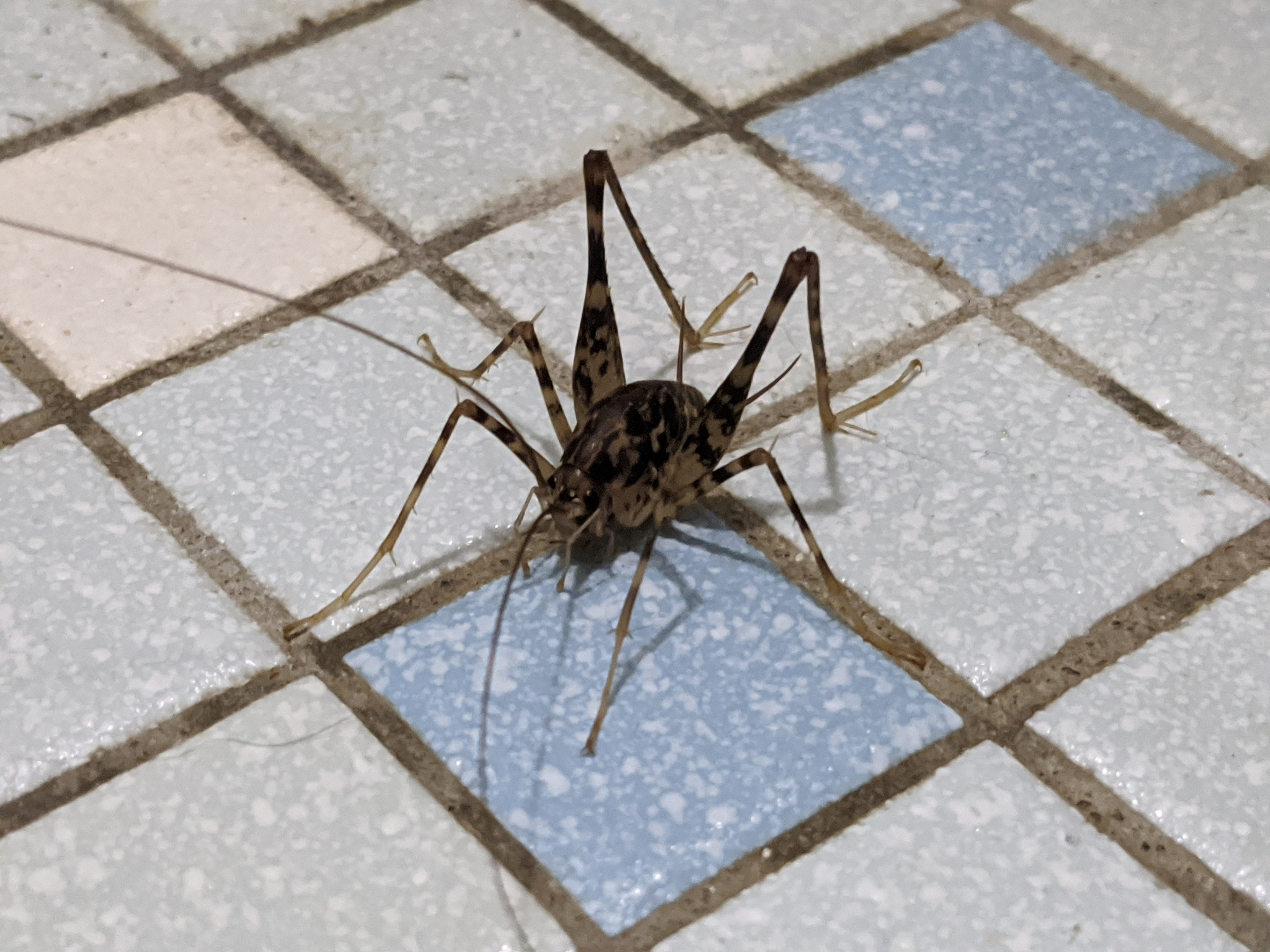
- Diestrammena japanica

Scientific classification
- Domain: Eukaryota
- Kingdom: Animalia
- Phylum: Arthropoda
- Class: Insecta
- Order: Orthoptera
- Suborder: Ensifera
- Family: Rhaphidophoridae
- Subfamily: Aemodogryllinae
- Tribe: Aemodogryllini
- Genus: Diestrammena; Brunner von Wattenwyl, 1888

Species
- See text

= Diestrammena =

Genus of insects

Diestrammena is a 'camel' or 'cave-cricket' genus in the family Rhaphidophoridae. Species in the genus are native to Asia, including Japan.

Note: this genus should not be confused with the similarly-named Diestramima which also belongs to the subfamily Aemodogryllinae.

== Species ==
The Orthoptera Species File includes two subgenera and lists:
subgenus Aemodogryllus Adelung, 1902 - Japan

- Diestrammena brunneri Adelung, 1902
- Diestrammena davidi Sugimoto & Ichikawa, 2003
- Diestrammena elegantissima Griffini, 1912
- Diestrammena goliath Bey-Bienko, 1929
- Diestrammena hisanorum Sugimoto & Ichikawa, 2003
- Diestrammena itodo Sugimoto & Ichikawa, 2003
- Diestrammena nicolai Gorochov, 2002
- Diestrammena robusta Ander, 1932
- Diestrammena taniusagi Sugimoto & Ichikawa, 2003
- Diestrammena taramensis Sugimoto & Ichikawa, 2003
- Diestrammena tsushimensis Storozhenko, 1990
- Diestrammena yakumontana Sugimoto & Ichikawa, 2003

subgenus Diestrammena Brunner von Wattenwyl, 1888 - China, Japan, Indo-China and Sulawesi

- Diestrammena annandalel Griffini, 1915
- Diestrammena gigas Sugimoto & Ichikawa, 2003
- Diestrammena griffinii Chopard, 1916
- Diestrammena heinrichi Ramme, 1943
- Diestrammena indica Chopard, 1921
- Diestrammena inexpectata Sugimoto & Ichikawa, 2003
- Diestrammena ingens Karny, 1915
- Diestrammena iriomotensis Gorochov, 2002
- Diestrammena japanica Blatchley, 1920 - type species (as Locusta marmorata Haan)
- Diestrammena kurilensis Storozhenko, 1990
- Diestrammena palliceps Walker, 1869
- Diestrammena unicolor Brunner von Wattenwyl, 1888

Now placed in Tachycines or superseded

- Diestrammena asynamora Adelung, 1902
- Diestrammena bifurcata Gorochov, 2010
- Diestrammena caudata Gorochov, Rampini & di Russo, 2006
- Diestrammena crenata di Russo & Rampini, 2005
- Diestrammena ferecaeca Gorochov, Rampini & di Russo, 2006
- Diestrammena improvisa Gorochov, 2010
- Diestrammena kabaki Gorochov, 2010
- Diestrammena omninocaeca Gorochov, Rampini & di Russo, 2006
- Diestrammena ovalilobata Gorochov, 2010
- Diestrammena semicrenata Gorochov, Rampini & di Russo, 2006
- Diestrammena solida Gorochov, Rampini & di Russo, 2006
- Diestrammena tonkinensis Chopard, 1929
