= Diestramima =

Scientific classification
- Domain: Eukaryota
- Kingdom: Animalia
- Phylum: Arthropoda
- Class: Insecta
- Order: Orthoptera
- Suborder: Ensifera
- Family: Rhaphidophoridae
- Tribe: Diestramimini
- Genus: Diestramima; Storozhenko, 1990

Genus of cricket-like animals

Diestramima is a genus of camel crickets in the subfamily Aemodogryllinae and tribe Diestramimini. Species can be found in: India, southern China and Indo-China.

Note: this genus should not be confused with the similarly-named Diestrammena which belongs to the tribe Aemodogryllini.

== Species ==
The Orthoptera Species File lists:

- Diestramima acutiapicis Zhu & Shi, 2018
- Diestramima austrosinensis Gorochov, 1998
- Diestramima beybienkoi Qin, Wang, Liu & Li, 2016
- Diestramima bina Zhu & Shi, 2018
- Diestramima bispinosa Gorochov & Storozhenko, 2015
- Diestramima brevis Qin, Wang, Liu & Li, 2016
- Diestramima champasak Gorochov & Storozhenko, 2015
- Diestramima conica Qin, Wang, Liu & Li, 2016
- Diestramima cryptopygia (Chopard, 1918)
- Diestramima curvicaudata Qin, Wang, Liu & Li, 2016
- Diestramima cycla Zhu & Shi, 2018
- Diestramima distincta Gorochov, 2010
- Diestramima emeiensis Qin, Wang, Liu & Li, 2016
- Diestramima eurya Zhu & Shi, 2018
- Diestramima excavata Qin, Wang, Liu & Li, 2016
- Diestramima guangxiensis Qin, Wang, Liu & Li, 2016
- Diestramima hainanensis Gorochov & Storozhenko, 2015
- Diestramima hamata Gorochov & Storozhenko, 2015
- Diestramima himalayana (Griffini, 1914)
- Diestramima intermedia Liu & Zhang, 2001
- Diestramima major Gorochov, 1998
- Diestramima minor Gorochov, 1998
- Diestramima palpata (Rehn, 1906) - type species
- Diestramima parabispinosa Qin, Wang, Liu & Li, 2016
- Diestramima propria Gorochov & Storozhenko, 2015
- Diestramima subrectis Qin, Wang, Liu & Li, 2016
- Diestramima subtilis Zhu & Shi, 2018
- Diestramima tibetensis Qin, Wang, Liu & Li, 2016
- Diestramima triangulata Qin, Wang, Liu & Li, 2016
- Diestramima truncata Zhu & Shi, 2018
- Diestramima tsongkhapa (Würmli, 1973)
- Diestramima vietnamensis Gorochov, 1998
- Diestramima yunnanensis Gorochov & Storozhenko, 2015
