= Tam Đảo National Park =

National Park in Vietnam

Tam Dao National Park
- IUCN category II (national park)
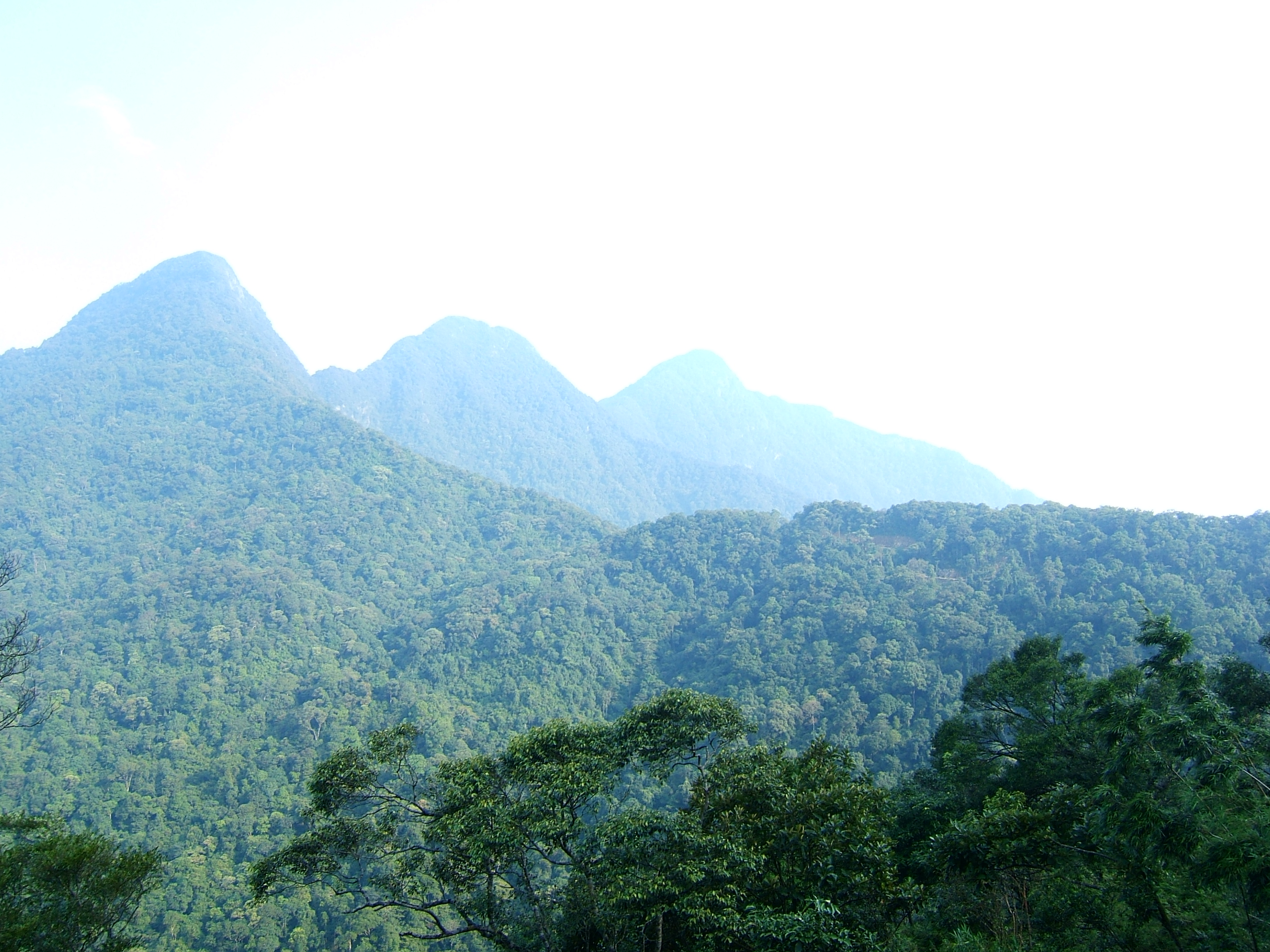

- Location within Vietnam
- Location: Northeast, Vietnam
- Nearest city: Hanoi
- Coordinates: 21°31′0″N 105°33′0″E
- Area: 368.83 km^{2} (142.41 sq mi)
- Established: 1996

Tam Dao National Park (Vietnamese: Vườn quốc gia Tam Đảo) is a protected area zone in northern Vietnam. It was established in 1996, succeeding from the Conservation Forest Tam Dao which was formed in 1977. The park is about 85 km northwest of Hanoi.

Its exact location is at 21°21’ to 21°42’ North latitude, 105°23’ to 105°44’ East longitude. It spans a large area along the Tam Đảo range and administratively belongs to 7 areas: Lập Thạch, Tam Dương, Bình Xuyên and Vĩnh Yên of Phú Thọ Province; Sơn Dương of Tuyên Quang Province; Đại Từ and Phổ Yên of Thái Nguyên Province.

== Natural condition ==
Tam Dao National Park is based in the Tam Đảo range, which is one of the terminal spurs of a larger mountainous area in the Northwest region of Vietnam. It runs 80 km from north west to south east, and has more than 20 peaks with altitudes of over 1000m. The highest summit is Tam Đảo North with an altitude of 1592 m. Three other peaks in the area include Thien Thi at 1375 m, Thach Ban at 1388 m and Phu Nghia at 1300 m. Sharp peaks with sloping sides and numerous, deep partitions are characteristic of the topology.

At an elevation of 930 metres, Tam Đảo town was established by French colonists in 1907 as a tranquil hill resort in northern Vietnam. Several villas designed for the French still remain. It is now an enclave administratively belonging to Vinh Yen city.

The boundary of the national park is located at an altitude of 100 m around the Tam Đảo range. There is a larger buffer zone (which has area of approximately 535 km^{2}) which surrounds the national park which has an altitude below 100 m. Seventy per cent of the area of the park is covered by natural and artificial forest. The natural forest is about 220 km^{2} and the human altered forest is about 30 km^{2}.

Due to the tall mountainous range that splits the area into two parts, the national park's climatic condition is divided into two areas with different rainfalls. This difference and some other factors such as the effect of human activity divide the park into some smaller climatic zones which increase the bio-diversity in the park.

== Flora ==
According to research, Tam Dao park has eight kinds of forest types distributed in different topographic and climatic areas :

- The tropical moist evergreen forest covers most of Tam Đảo Range below the altitude of 800 m. Some rare and precious species include Hopea chinensis (synonym Shorea chinensis), Michelia, Cinnamomum sp. and Pavieasia anamensis.
- The subtropical moist evergreen low mountain forest covers the areas over 800 m and includes the species of the families: Lauraceae, Fagaceae, Theaceae, Magnoliaceae, and Hamamelidaceae. In places with altitudes of over 1000 m there are some species of conifer such as Dacrycarpus imbricatus, Fokienia hodginsii, Podocarpus neriifolius, and Nageia fleuryi. Below the canopy there are species of the families Rubiaceae (coffee family), Myrsinaceae or Euphorbiaceae.
- The high mountain short forest is a dwarf variety of two aforementioned forest types including species of these families: Ericaceae, Lauraceae, Fagaceae, Illiciaceae, and Aceraceae.
- The bamboo forest only covers 8.84 km^{2} and sparsely appears at altitudes of 500 m to 800 m.
- The restored forest was created after the establishment the national park. Before that, this area was exploited to harvest wood by forest management and was cultivated by farmers. Now this area has been replanted with species such as Symplocos, Litsea cubeba, and a species of Xylopia.
- The plantation forest was established in the French colonial period with Pinus massoniana (Horsetail Pine).
- The bush appears in some dry and sun exposed areas including Aporosa dioica, Bridelia tomentosa, species of Helicteres, and Phyllanthus emblica.
- The grassland appears in areas of exploited forest, and includes Saccharum spontaneum, Thysanolaena maxima, Chromolaena odorata (over 2 m) Imperata cylindrica, Paspalum scrobiculatum, and Setaria viridis (under 2 m) .

Out of over 2000 plant species, 904 species are considered useful to humans. They have been classified into eight groups:

Group	Use	Number of species	Scale(%)
I	Wood	379	41.92
II	Fruit	25	2.76
III	Fibre	20	2.21
IV	Medicine	311	34.40
V	Essential oil	32	3.54
VI	Vegetable	30	3.32
VII	Aesthetic purpose	102	11.28
VIII	Starch	5	0.55

There are 42 species endemic to Tam Dao National Park and also 64 other species considered rare including Dendrobium daoensis, Camellia polyodonta var. longicaudata, Camellia petelotii, Asarum petelotii, Mosla tamdaoensis, and Paris delavayi.

== Fauna ==
The national park has diverse animal species, with estimates of vertebrates listed below:

Class	Number of orders	Number of families	Number of genera	Number of species
Mammal	8	25	48	64
Bird	16	50	140	239
Reptile	3	14	46	75
Amphibian	3	7	11	28

Eleven of these species are endemic to Tam Dao National Park including the snake species Amphiesma angeli and Boiga multitempolaris, three amphibians including Paramesotriton deloustali; five bird species, four reptiles and one species of amphibian are endemic to Vietnam. Guide books report that some of this bio-diversity can be seen in the restaurants which have been known to serve endangered species.

Among the many species of insects; at least 22 species are endemic to northern Vietnam, with the Orthopteran genera Tamdaora and Tamdaotettix and various species named after the Park, including: the planthopper Maculergithus tamdao, the grasshopper Caryanda tamdaoensis, the cricket Metriogryllacris tamdao and the moth Fansipaniana tamdaoensis.

== Tourism ==
There are two sites for tourists in the park. The first is Tam Đảo town which was established in 1907. Tam Đảo is nestled in a valley covering only 3 km^{2}. There now remain a stone church, some villas and palaces built by French colonists. It has Thac Bac (The Silver Fall), Rung Rinh peak and Tam Đảo 2, a remnant of another resort built many years ago.

The second tourist location is Tay Thien site. It includes Tay Thien Quoc Mau Temple (literally The "Temple of West Heaven National Mother") and many pagodas. Along with Thien Vien Truc Lam (literally: "Dhyana Palace in Bamboo Forest") in Da Lat and Yen Tu, Thien Vien Truc Lam Tay Thien is a center of Vietnamese Buddhism. Asiatic black bears (moon bears) rescued from the bile-harvesting industry may be observed in the park after being rehabilitated and released into forest habitats by the Vietnam Bear Rescue Centre.

== Climate ==
Climate data for Tam Đảo, elevation 897 m (2,943 ft)
Month	Jan	Feb	Mar	Apr	May	Jun	Jul	Aug	Sep	Oct	Nov	Dec	Year
Record high °C (°F)	26.2 (79.2)	29.0 (84.2)	30.7 (87.3)	32.1 (89.8)	33.4 (92.1)	33.0 (91.4)	31.8 (89.2)	32.4 (90.3)	30.8 (87.4)	29.0 (84.2)	27.3 (81.1)	24.7 (76.5)	33.4 (92.1)
Mean daily maximum °C (°F)	13.8 (56.8)	15.0 (59.0)	17.9 (64.2)	21.8 (71.2)	25.0 (77.0)	26.3 (79.3)	26.2 (79.2)	25.8 (78.4)	24.8 (76.6)	22.5 (72.5)	19.3 (66.7)	16.0 (60.8)	21.2 (70.2)
Daily mean °C (°F)	11.2 (52.2)	12.5 (54.5)	15.4 (59.7)	19.0 (66.2)	21.7 (71.1)	23.1 (73.6)	23.2 (73.8)	22.8 (73.0)	21.7 (71.1)	19.2 (66.6)	16.0 (60.8)	12.7 (54.9)	18.2 (64.8)
Mean daily minimum °C (°F)	9.5 (49.1)	10.7 (51.3)	13.6 (56.5)	17.0 (62.6)	19.6 (67.3)	21.1 (70.0)	21.2 (70.2)	20.9 (69.6)	19.8 (67.6)	17.3 (63.1)	14.1 (57.4)	10.7 (51.3)	16.3 (61.3)
Record low °C (°F)	0.4 (32.7)	0.0 (32.0)	0.5 (32.9)	7.0 (44.6)	9.5 (49.1)	14.3 (57.7)	16.2 (61.2)	17.3 (63.1)	10.6 (51.1)	9.1 (48.4)	4.5 (40.1)	1.1 (34.0)	0.0 (32.0)
Average precipitation mm (inches)	36.4 (1.43)	47.0 (1.85)	82.2 (3.24)	139.3 (5.48)	235.6 (9.28)	354.3 (13.95)	439.6 (17.31)	452.5 (17.81)	325.5 (12.81)	198.0 (7.80)	85.2 (3.35)	35.3 (1.39)	2,430.9 (95.70)
Average rainy days	17.0	18.6	21.3	19.5	17.6	18.2	20.4	20.3	16.1	13.1	10.4	11.0	203.7
Average relative humidity (%)	89.0	91.4	91.3	91.0	88.1	87.8	88.6	88.8	85.8	83.3	81.3	83.0	87.4
Mean monthly sunshine hours	61.8	44.7	58.6	81.5	133.0	122.0	138.5	126.4	136.8	129.7	115.4	107.1	1,253.7
Source: Vietnam Institute for Building Science and Technology
