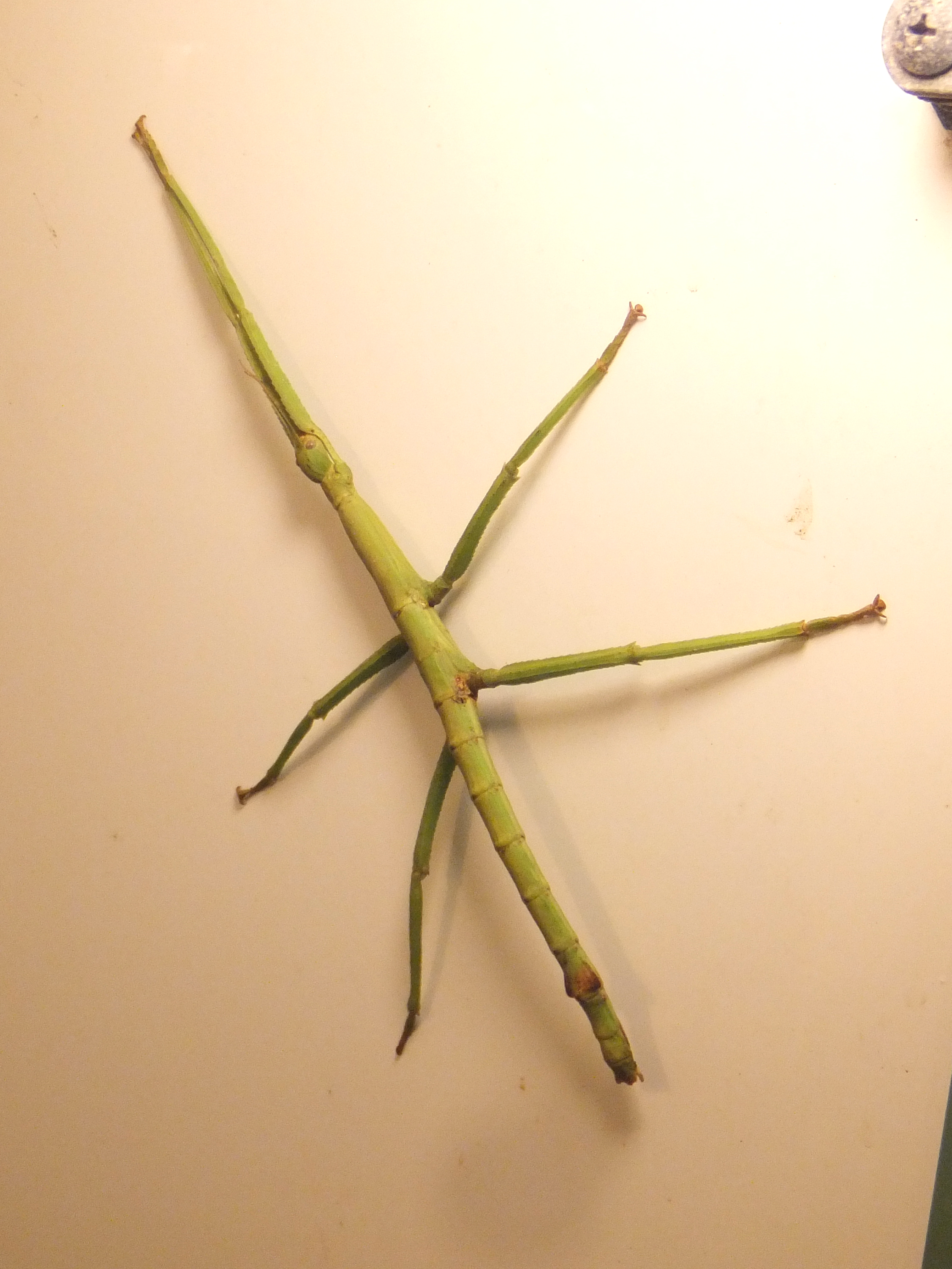
- Pharnacia ponderosa

Scientific classification
- Kingdom: Animalia
- Phylum: Arthropoda
- Class: Insecta
- Order: Phasmatodea
- Family: Phasmatidae
- Subfamily: Clitumninae
- Tribe: Pharnaciini; Günther, 1953

Synonyms
- Pharnachinii Bradley & Galil, 1977

= Pharnaciini =

Tribe of stick insects

Pharnaciini is a tribe of Asian stick insects, erected by Klaus Günther in 1953. Genera include some of the world's longest insect species.

== Genera ==
The Phasmida Species File includes:

1. Baculonistria Hennemann & Conle, 2008
2. Neophryganistria Ho, 2023
3. Pharnacia Stål, 1877
4. Phobaeticus Brunner von Wattenwyl, 1907
5. Phryganistria Stål, 1875
6. Tirachoidea Brunner von Wattenwyl, 1893
