= Alma (mountain) =

Mountain in New Zealand

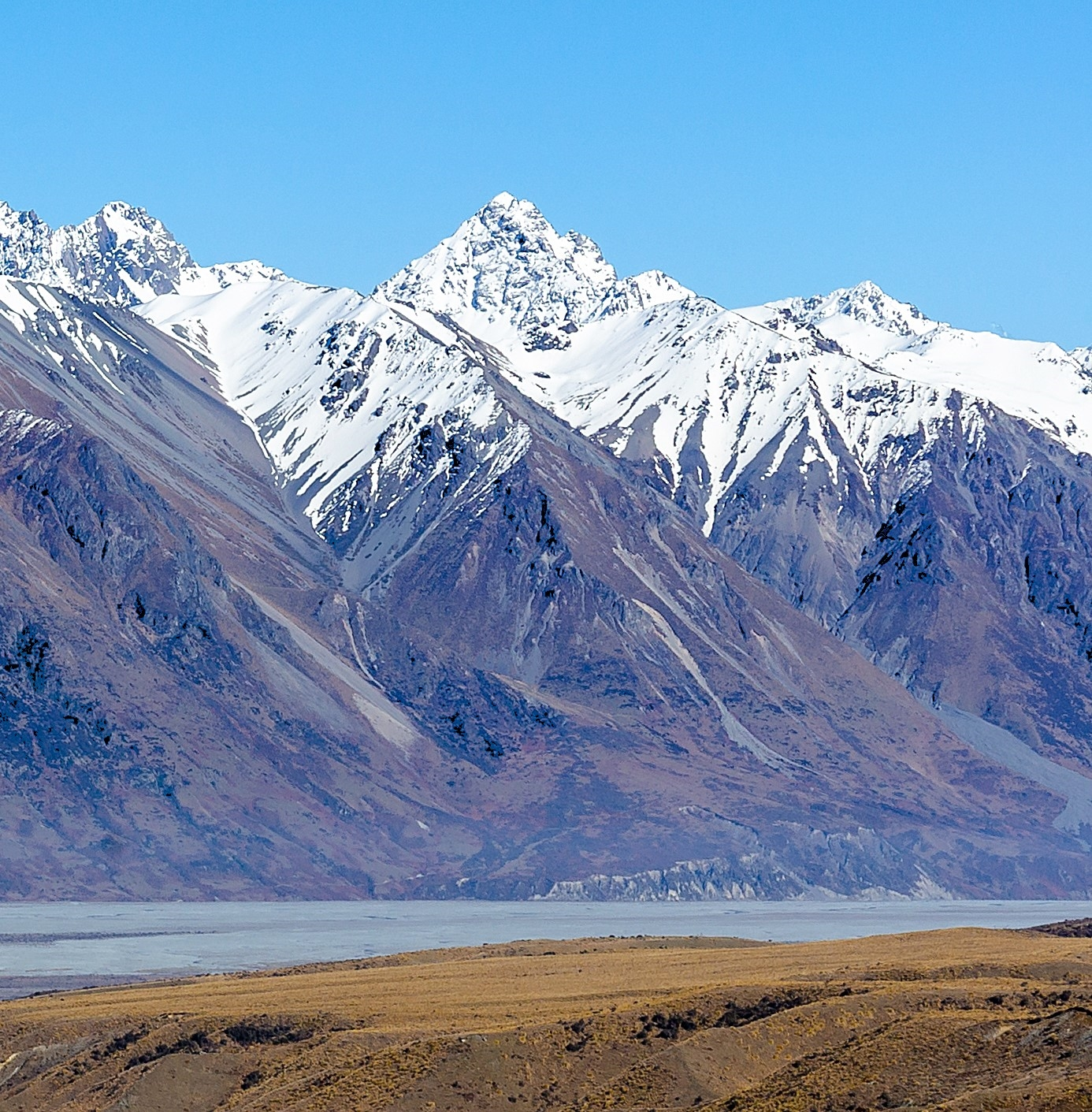
- East aspect

Highest point
- Elevation: 2,510 m (8,235 ft)
- Prominence: 371 m (1,217 ft)
- Isolation: 1.59 km (0.99 mi)
- Listing: Highest mountains of New Zealand
- Coordinates: 43°33′18″S 170°43′38″E

Geography
- Location within New Zealand
- Interactive map of Alma
- Location: South Island
- Country: New Zealand
- Region: Canterbury
- Protected area: Te Kahui Kaupeka Conservation Park
- Parent range: Southern Alps; Two Thumb Range
- Topo map(s): NZMS260 I36; Topo50 BX17

Climbing
- First ascent: 1923
- Easiest route: Northeast Ridge (Alma Spur)

Alma is a 2,510-metre-elevation (8,235-foot) mountain in the Canterbury Region of New Zealand.

== Description ==
Alma is the fourth-highest peak of the Two Thumb Range which is a subrange of the Southern Alps. It is situated 170 kilometres (106 mi) west of the city of Christchurch and is set within Te Kahui Kaupeka Conservation Park in the Canterbury Region of South Island. Most precipitation runoff from the mountain drains east to the Rangitata River via Alma Stream, except the southwest slope which drains into Trojan Stream → North East Gorge Stream → Macaulay River → Godley River → Lake Tekapo. Topographic relief is significant as the summit rises over 1,100 metres (3,609 feet) above Alma Stream in three kilometres. The first ascent of the summit was made in December 1923 by Harold (Ned) Porter, Hugh Chambers, and Clive Barker. The nearest higher peak is Achilles Peak, 1.6 km south, and separated by Alma Col. The peak, stream and col are probably named to commemorate the Alma River in Crimea where French, British, and Ottoman armies defeated the Russians on 20 September 1854 during the Battle of the Alma.

== Climate ==
Based on the Köppen climate classification, Alma is located in a marine west coast (Cfb) climate zone. Prevailing westerly winds blow moist air from the Tasman Sea onto the mountains, where the air is forced upward by the mountains (orographic lift), causing moisture to drop in the form of rain or snow. The months of December through February offer the most favourable weather for viewing or climbing this peak.

== Gallery ==
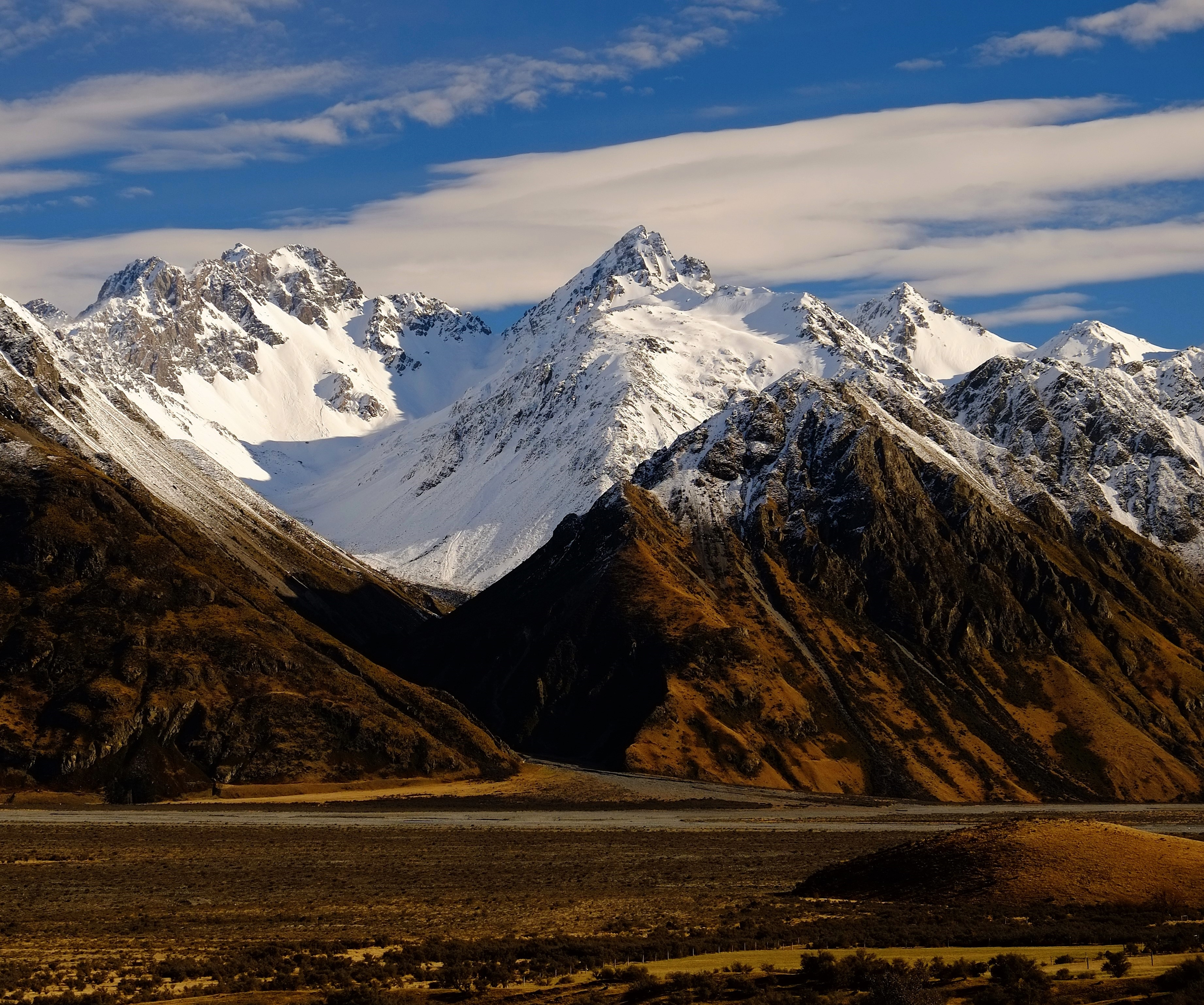
East aspect centred

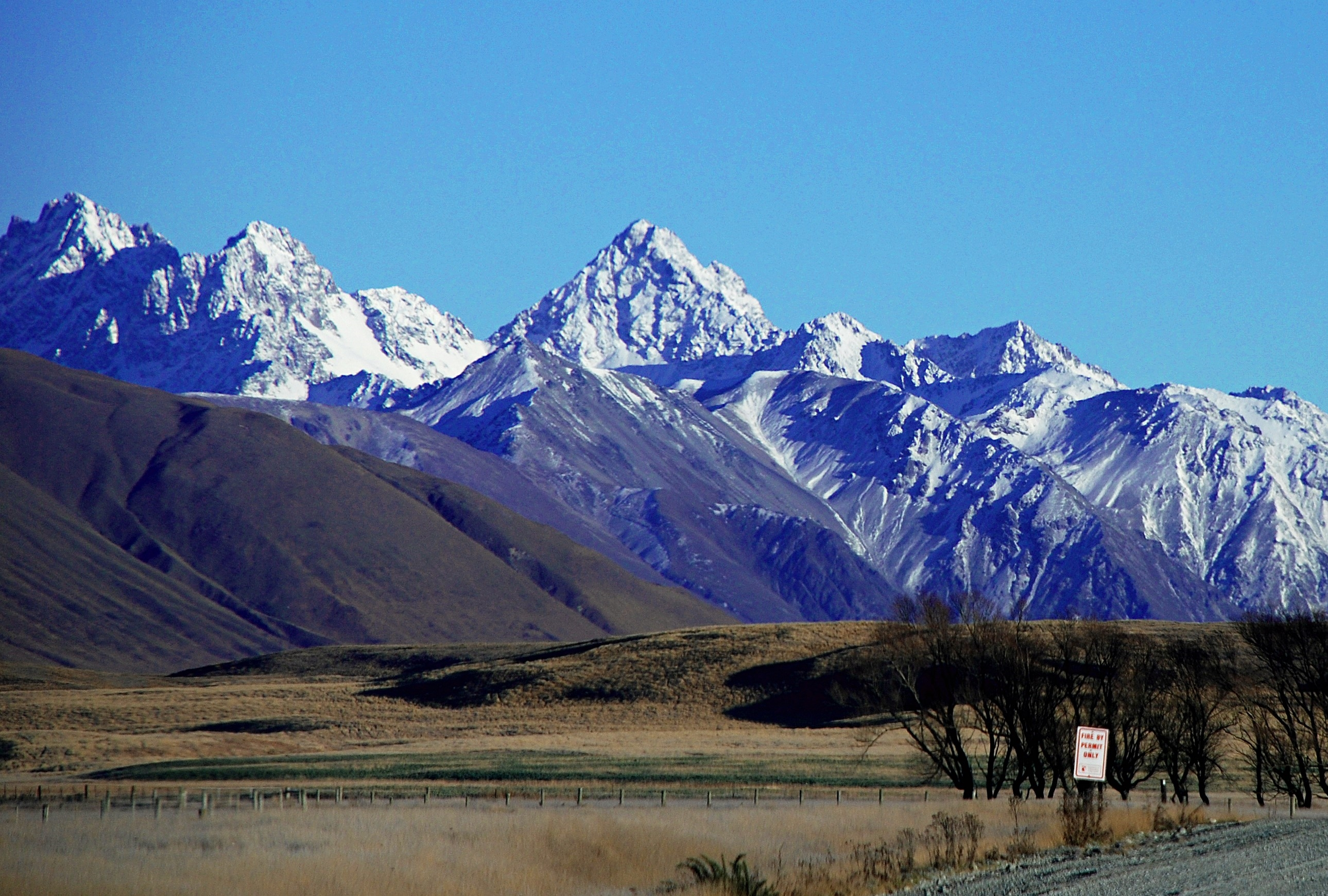
Alma centred, Achilles to left

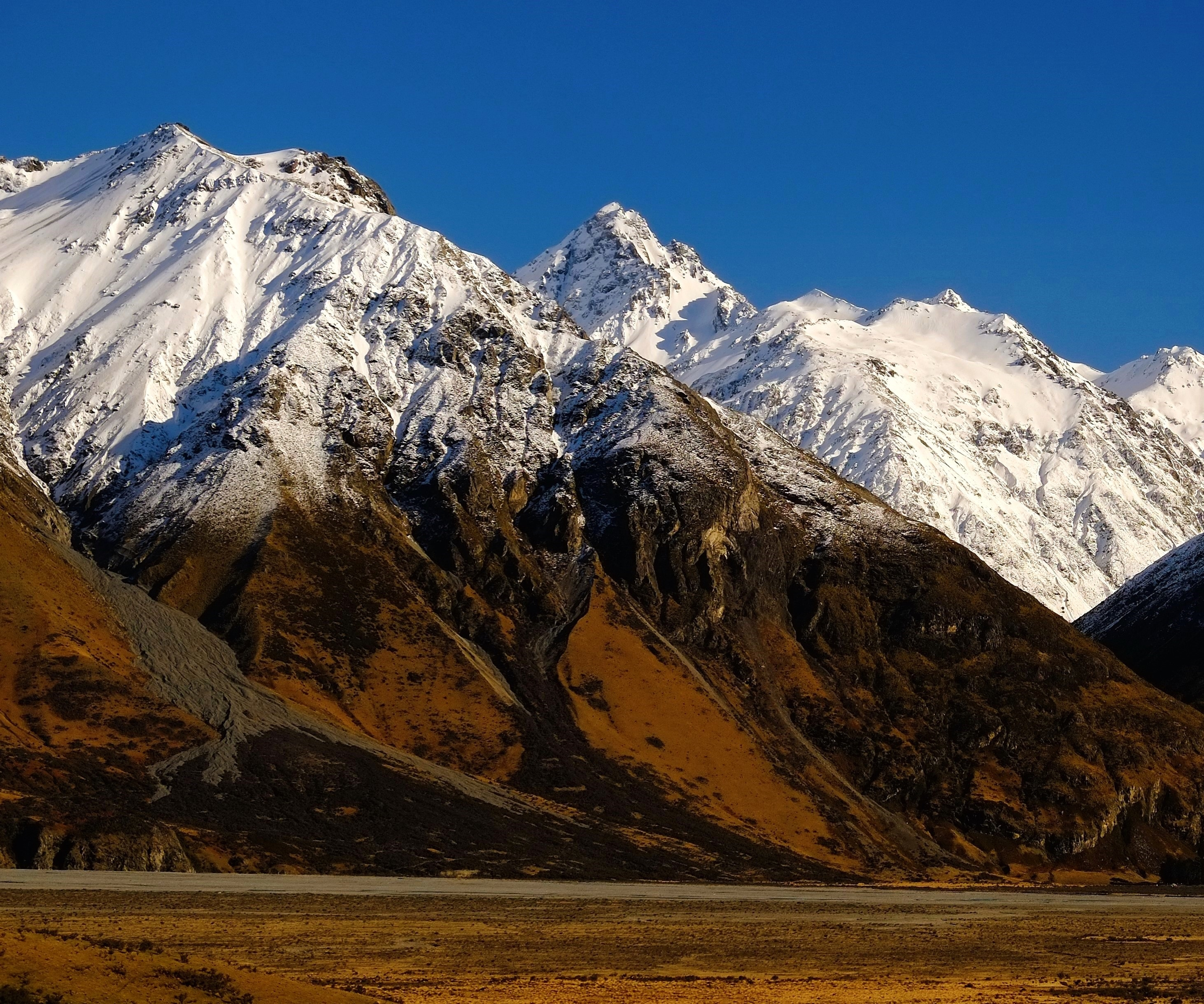
Alma centred in back

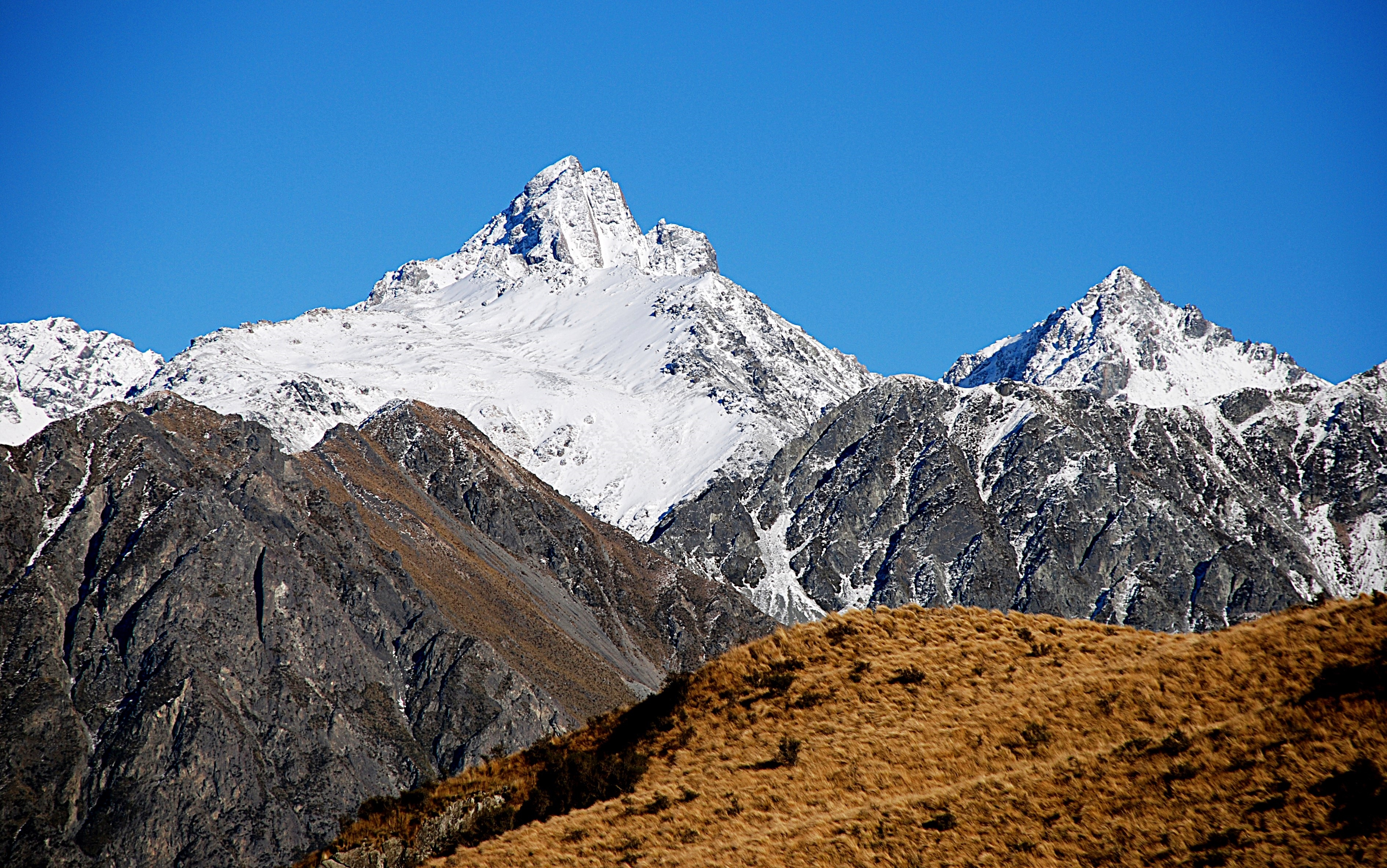
Alma left of centre

== See also ==
- List of mountains of New Zealand by height
- Torlesse Composite Terrane
