= The Thumbs (New Zealand) =

Mountain in New Zealand

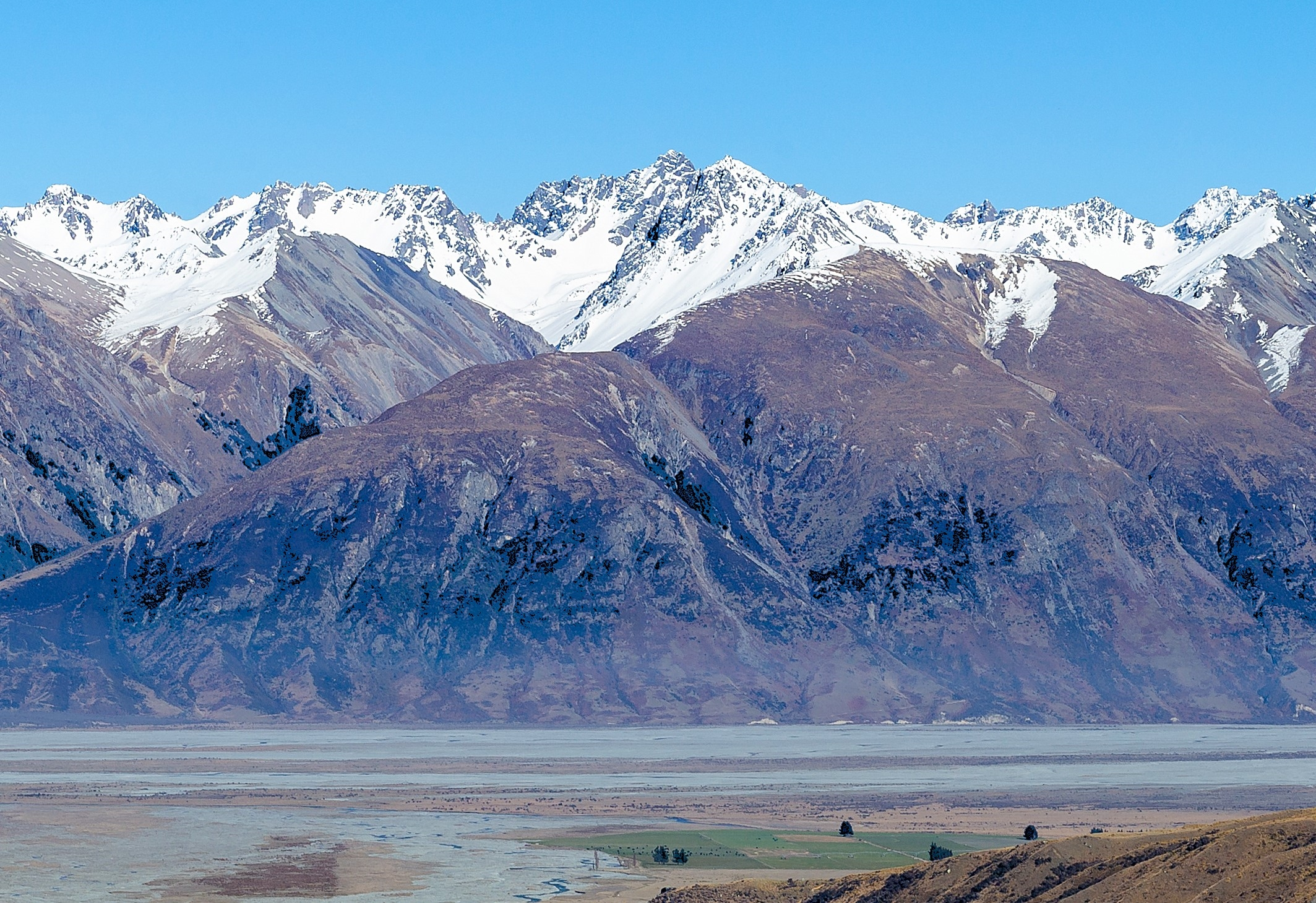
- East aspect, centered at top

Highest point
- Elevation: 2,546 m (8,353 ft)
- Prominence: 726 m (2,382 ft)
- Isolation: 14.18 km (8.81 mi)
- Listing: Highest mountains of New Zealand
- Coordinates: 43°35′35″S 170°43′37″E

Geography
- Location within New Zealand
- Interactive map of The Thumbs
- Location: South Island
- Country: New Zealand
- Region: Canterbury
- Protected area: Te Kahui Kaupeka Conservation Park
- Parent range: Southern Alps; Two Thumb Range
- Topo map(s): NZMS260 I36; Topo50 BX17

Climbing
- First ascent: 1922
- Easiest route: South Ridge or North Face

The Thumbs is a 2,546-metre-elevation (8,353-foot) mountain in the Canterbury Region of New Zealand.

== Description ==
The Thumbs is the second-highest peak of the Two Thumb Range which is a subrange of the Southern Alps. It is situated 170 kilometres (106 mi) west of the city of Christchurch and is set within Te Kahui Kaupeka Conservation Park in the Canterbury Region of South Island. The mountain is a double summit, with the south peak being higher. The first ascent of the true summit was made in February 1922 by Harold (Ned) Porter, Hugh Chambers, and Clive Barker. The Lower Thumb did not see a first ascent until 15 years later when a party of Canterbury mountaineers climbed both of the Thumbs. The nearest higher peak is Mount Sibbald, 14 km to the west-northwest. Precipitation runoff from the mountain's north and east slopes drains east to the Rangitata River via Black Birch Creek, whereas the west slope drains into Two Thumb Stream → North East Gorge Stream → Macaulay River → Godley River → Lake Tekapo. Topographic relief is significant as the summit rises 1,440 metres (4,724 feet) above North East Gorge Stream in three kilometres.

== Climate ==
Based on the Köppen climate classification, The Thumbs is located in a marine west coast (Cfb) climate zone. Prevailing westerly winds blow moist air from the Tasman Sea onto the mountains, where the air is forced upward by the mountains (orographic lift), causing moisture to drop in the form of rain or snow. The months of December through February offer the most favourable weather for viewing or climbing this peak.

== See also ==
- List of mountains of New Zealand by height
- Torlesse Composite Terrane

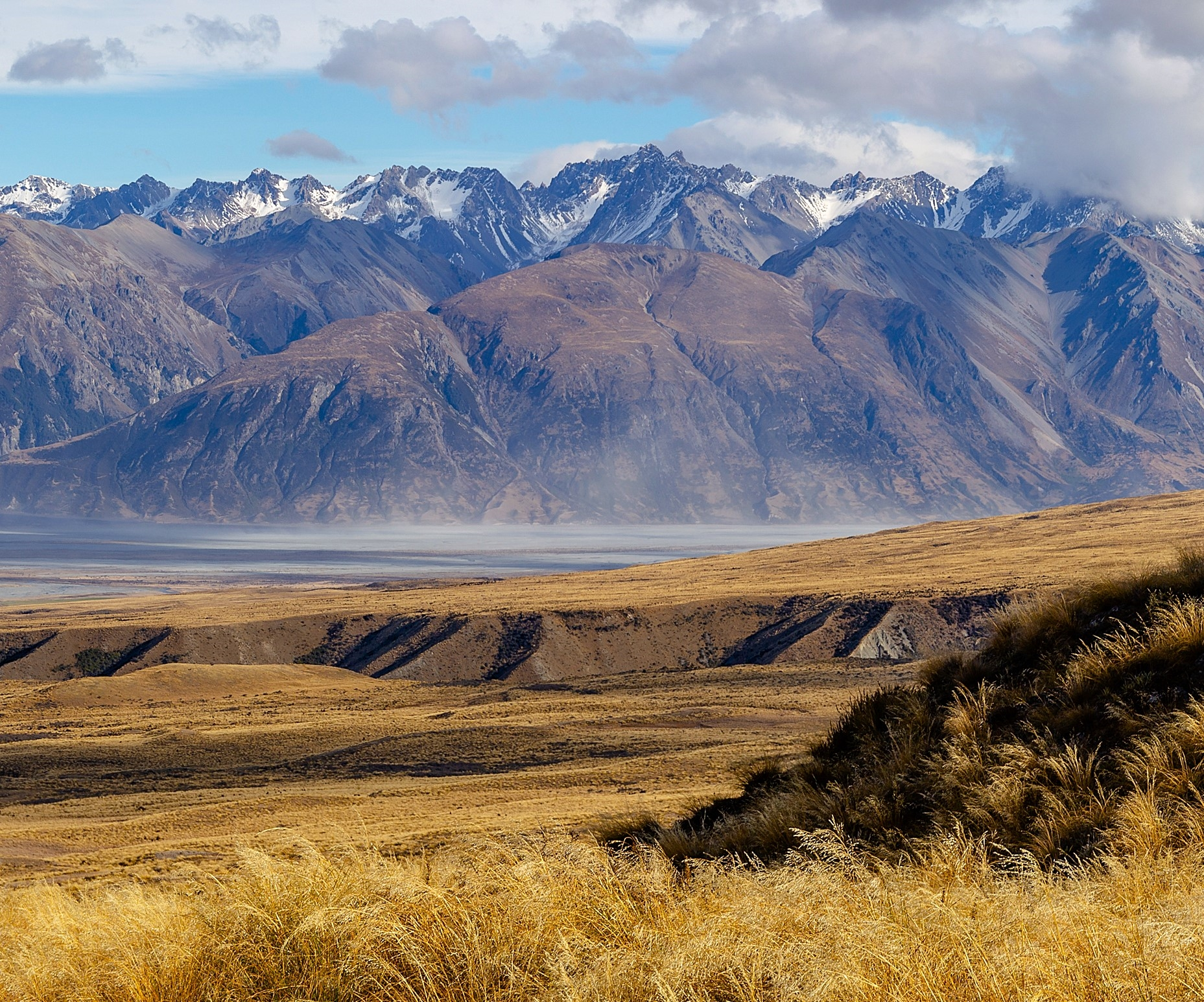
The Thumbs centered on skyline
