= Achilles Peak =

Mountain in New Zealand

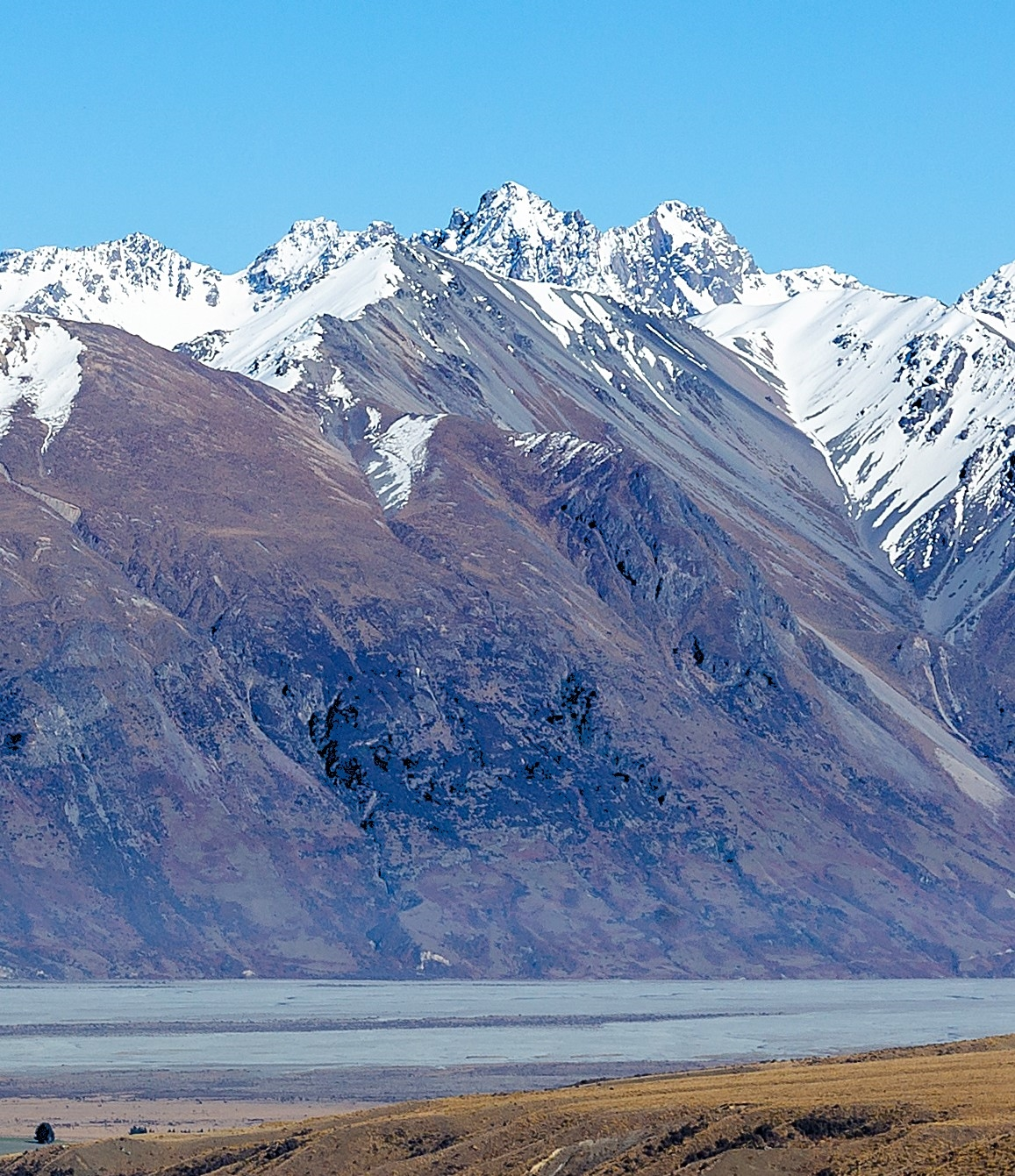
- East aspect, centered at top

Highest point
- Elevation: 2,540 m (8,333 ft)
- Prominence: 240 m (787 ft)
- Isolation: 2.7 km (1.7 mi)
- Coordinates: 43°34′08″S 170°43′27″E

Naming
- Etymology: HMNZS Achilles

Geography
- Location within New Zealand
- Interactive map of Achilles Peak
- Location: South Island
- Country: New Zealand
- Region: Canterbury
- Protected area: Te Kahui Kaupeka Conservation Park
- Parent range: Southern Alps; Two Thumb Range
- Topo map(s): NZMS260 I36; Topo50 BX17

Climbing
- First ascent: 1941
- Easiest route: West slope

Achilles Peak is a 2,540-metre-elevation (8,333-foot) mountain in the Canterbury Region of New Zealand.

== Description ==
Achilles Peak is the third-highest peak in the Two Thumb Range which is a subrange of the Southern Alps. It is situated 170 kilometres (106 mi) west of the city of Christchurch and is set within Te Kahui Kaupeka Conservation Park in the Canterbury Region of South Island. The peak has a subsummit to the northeast designated Low Peak (2,450 m) on topographic maps. The nearest higher peak is The Thumbs, 2.7 km to the south. Precipitation runoff from the mountain's east slope drains to the Rangitata River, whereas the west slope drains into Trojan Stream → North East Gorge Stream → Macaulay River → Godley River → Lake Tekapo. Topographic relief is significant as the summit rises 1,340 metres (4,396 feet) above North East Gorge Stream in three kilometres. The first ascent of the summit was made in December 1941 by Bob Clark-Hall, J.L. (Pat) Clark-Hall, and Tom Beckett.

== Etymology ==
The name commemorates New Zealand's involvement in the Battle of the River Plate, specifically HMNZS Achilles, a light cruiser that served in the Royal New Zealand Navy during the Second World War. In turn, the ship's namesake was Achilles, the mythological hero of the Trojan War who was known as being the greatest of all the Greek warriors. This mountain's toponym has been officially approved by the New Zealand Geographic Board.

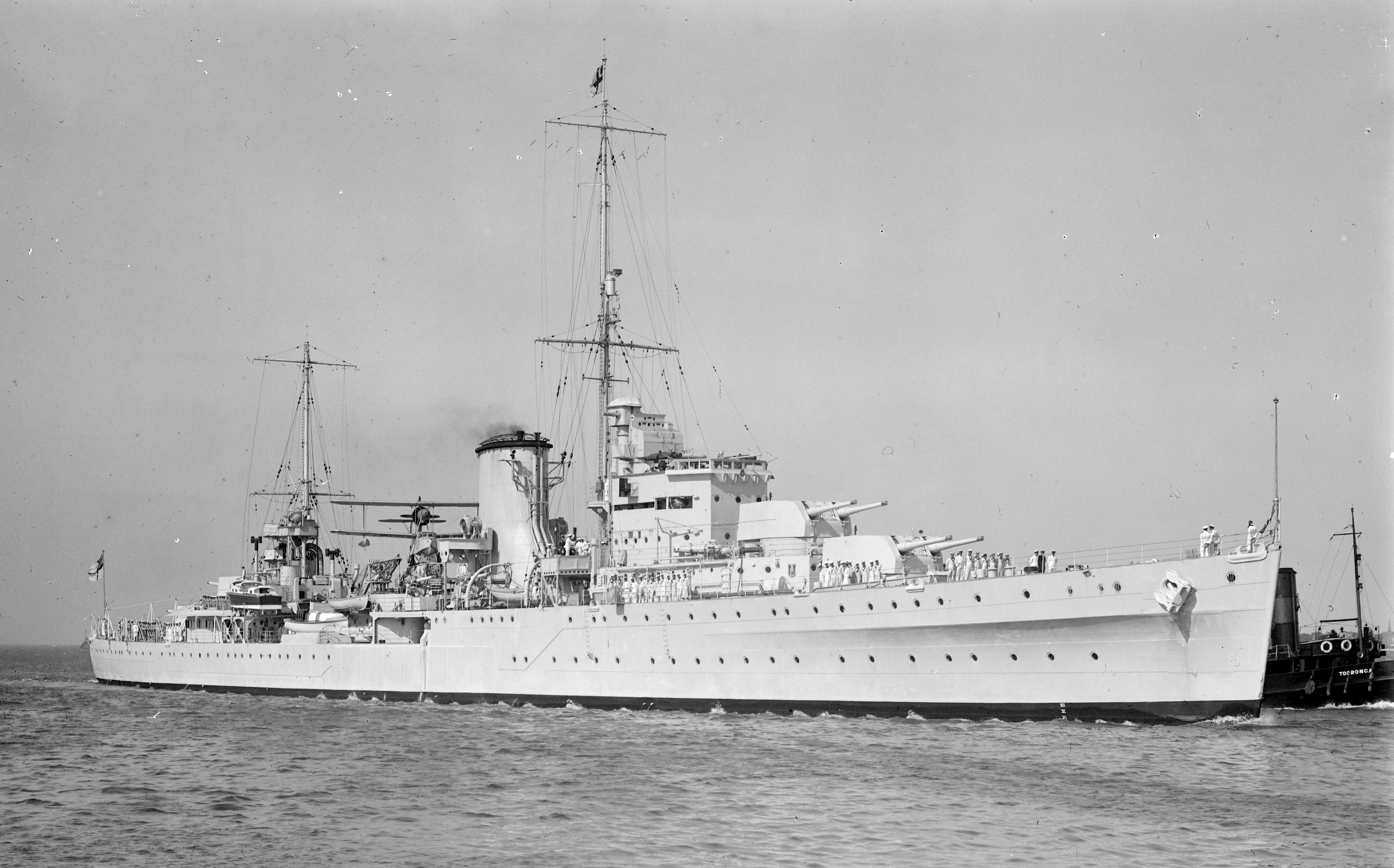
HMNZS Achilles

== Climate ==
Based on the Köppen climate classification, Achilles is located in a marine west coast (Cfb) climate zone. Prevailing westerly winds blow moist air from the Tasman Sea onto the mountains, where the air is forced upward by the mountains (orographic lift), causing moisture to drop in the form of rain or snow. The months of December through February offer the most favourable weather for viewing or climbing this peak.

== See also ==
- List of mountains of New Zealand by height
- Torlesse Composite Terrane
