= Coal River (Canterbury) =

River in Canterbury, New Zealand

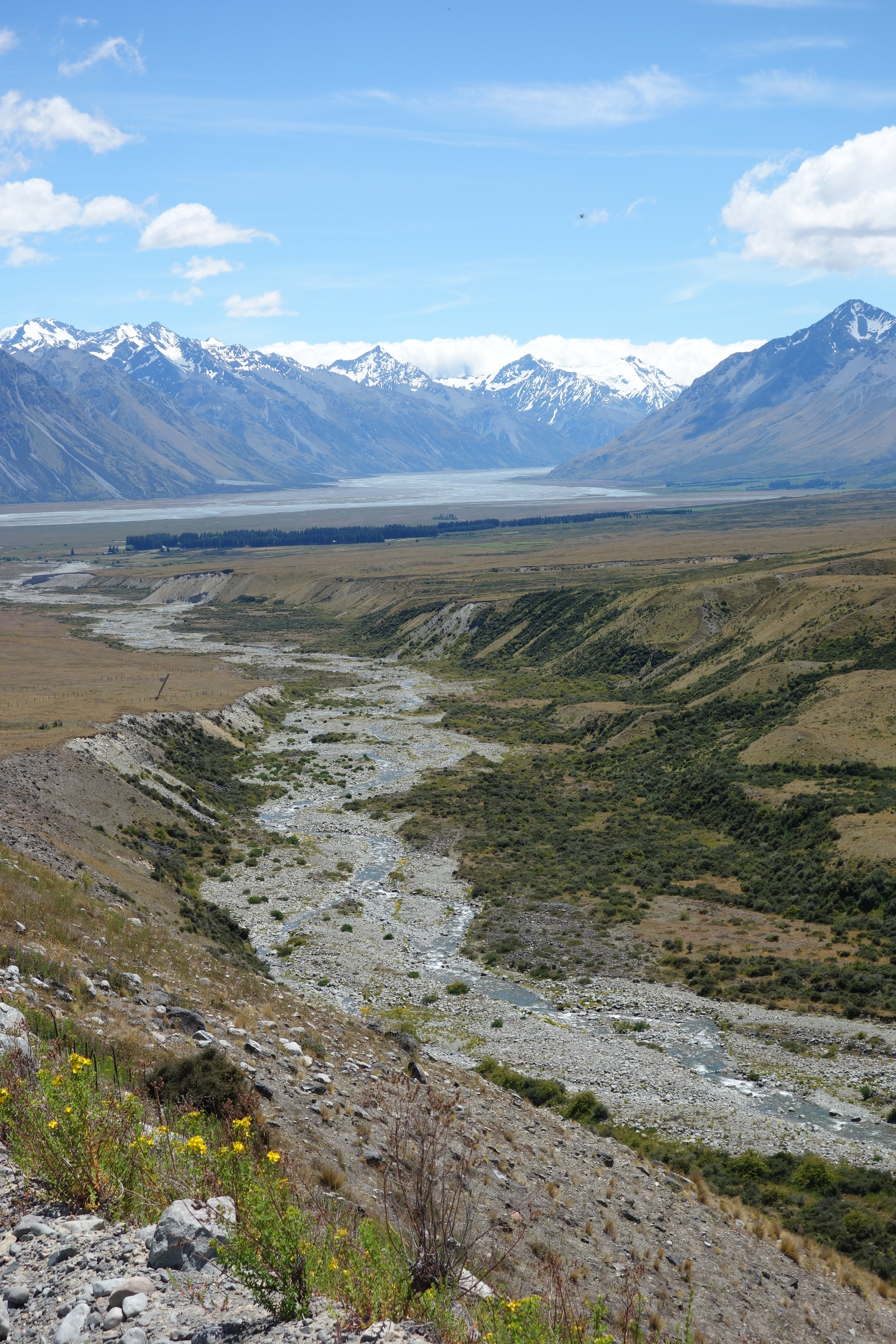
- The Coal River flowing down towards Lake Tekapo with the Godley River in the background

Location
- Country: New Zealand
- Region: Canterbury
- District: Mackenzie District

Physical characteristics
- Source
  - location: Two Thumb Range
- Mouth
  - location: Lake Tekapo
  - coordinates: 43.785°S 170.556°E
  - elevation: 710m

Basin features
- Tributaries
  - right: Camp Stream

Coal River is a river in Mackenzie District, Canterbury, New Zealand. The river flows westward from the Two Thumb Range into the northern end of Lake Tekapo.

== See also ==
- List of rivers of New Zealand
