= Mount Sibbald =

Mountain in New Zealand

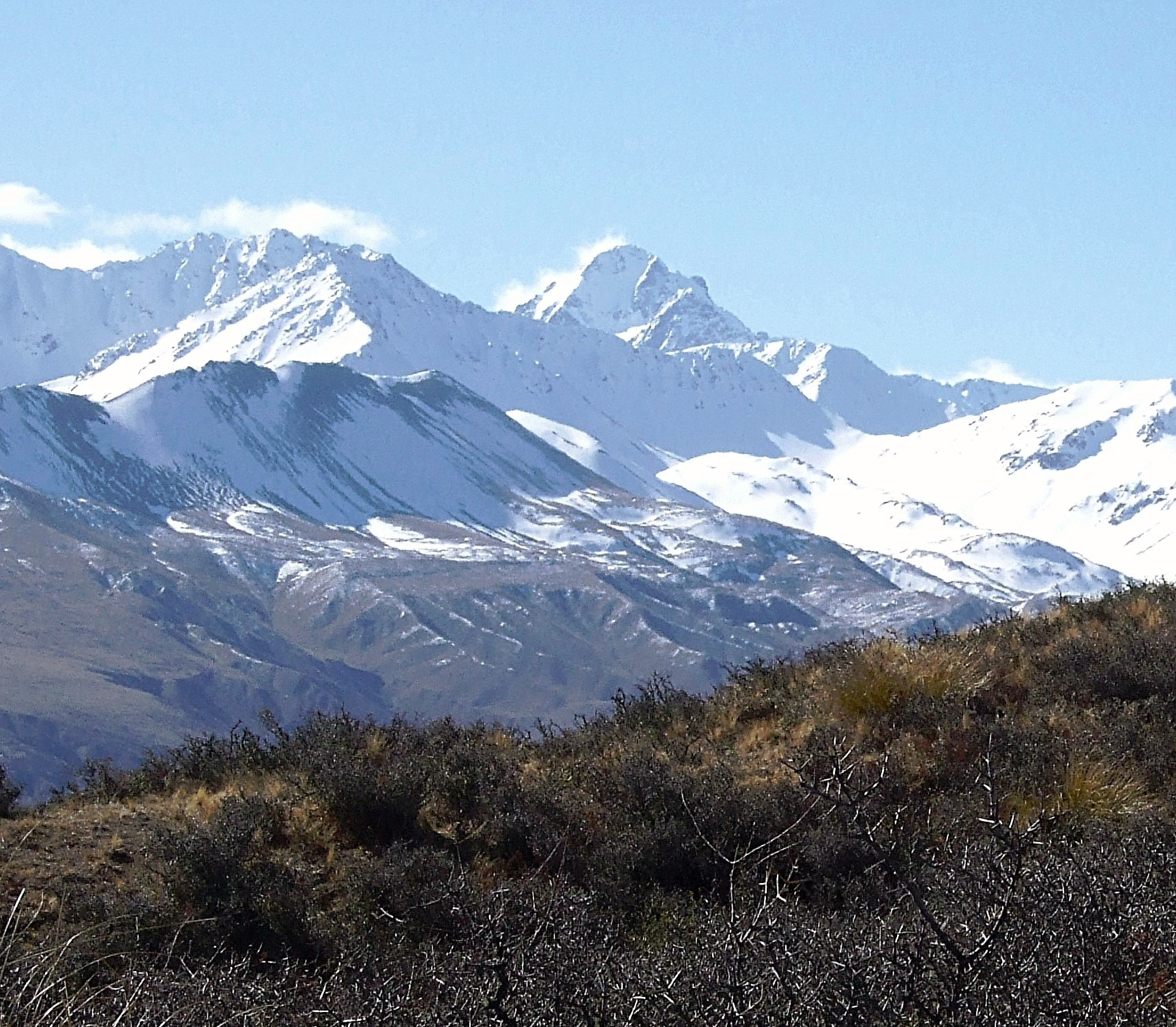
- South aspect, centred at top

Highest point
- Elevation: 2,811 m (9,222 ft)
- Prominence: 717 m (2,352 ft)
- Isolation: 9.91 km (6.16 mi)
- Listing: New Zealand #18
- Coordinates: 43°33′07″S 170°33′17″E

Naming
- Etymology: William Sibbald

Geography
- Location within New Zealand
- Interactive map of Mount Sibbald
- Location: South Island
- Country: New Zealand
- Region: Canterbury
- Protected area: Te Kahui Kaupeka Conservation Park
- Parent range: Southern Alps; Sibbald Range
- Topo map(s): NZMS260 I36; Topo50 BX17

Climbing
- First ascent: 1917

Mount Sibbald is a 2,811-metre-elevation (9,222-foot) mountain in Canterbury, New Zealand.

== Description ==
Mount Sibbald is the highest point of the Sibbald Range which is a small subrange of the Southern Alps. It is located 193 kilometres (120 mi) west of the city of Christchurch in the Canterbury Region of the South Island. Precipitation runoff from the mountain drains west into the Godley River and east to the Macaulay River. Topographic relief is significant as the summit rises 1,700 metres (5,577 feet) above the Macaulay Valley in three kilometres, and 1,900 metres (6,234 feet) above the Godley Valley in four kilometres. The nearest higher neighbour is Mount D'Archiac, nine kilometres to the north. The mountain's toponym honours Sea Captain William Sibbald, the first runholder at nearby Lilybank Station in 1868. The first ascent of the summit was made in 1917 by Edgar Williams and William Kennedy.

== Climbing ==
Climbing routes and the first ascents:

- Via Lucifer Flat – Edgar Williams, William Kennedy – (1917)
- Unnamed – Neville Johnson, H.J. Newberry, Ian Powell – (1934)
- South East Ridge – G.D.T. Hall, A.H. Hines, L. Whitworth – (1936)
- South West Ridge (descent) – Duncan Hall, Albert Hines, L. Whitworth – (1936)
- North Ridge – J. Howie, R. Wills – (1948)
- North West Ridge – Eric Duggan, Dan Donaldson, Don French, Peter Lawenson – (2015)
- Bohemoth's Corridor – Tom Torok, Keeley Rhynd – (2018)

== Climate ==
Based on the Köppen climate classification, Mount Sibbald is located in a marine west coast (Cfb) climate zone, with a tundra climate at the summit. Prevailing westerly winds blow moist air from the Tasman Sea onto the mountains, where the air is forced upward by the mountains (orographic lift), causing moisture to drop in the form of rain or snow. This climate supports small unnamed glaciers on this mountain's slopes. The months of December through February offer the most favourable weather for viewing or climbing this peak.

== See also ==
- List of mountains of New Zealand by height

== Gallery ==
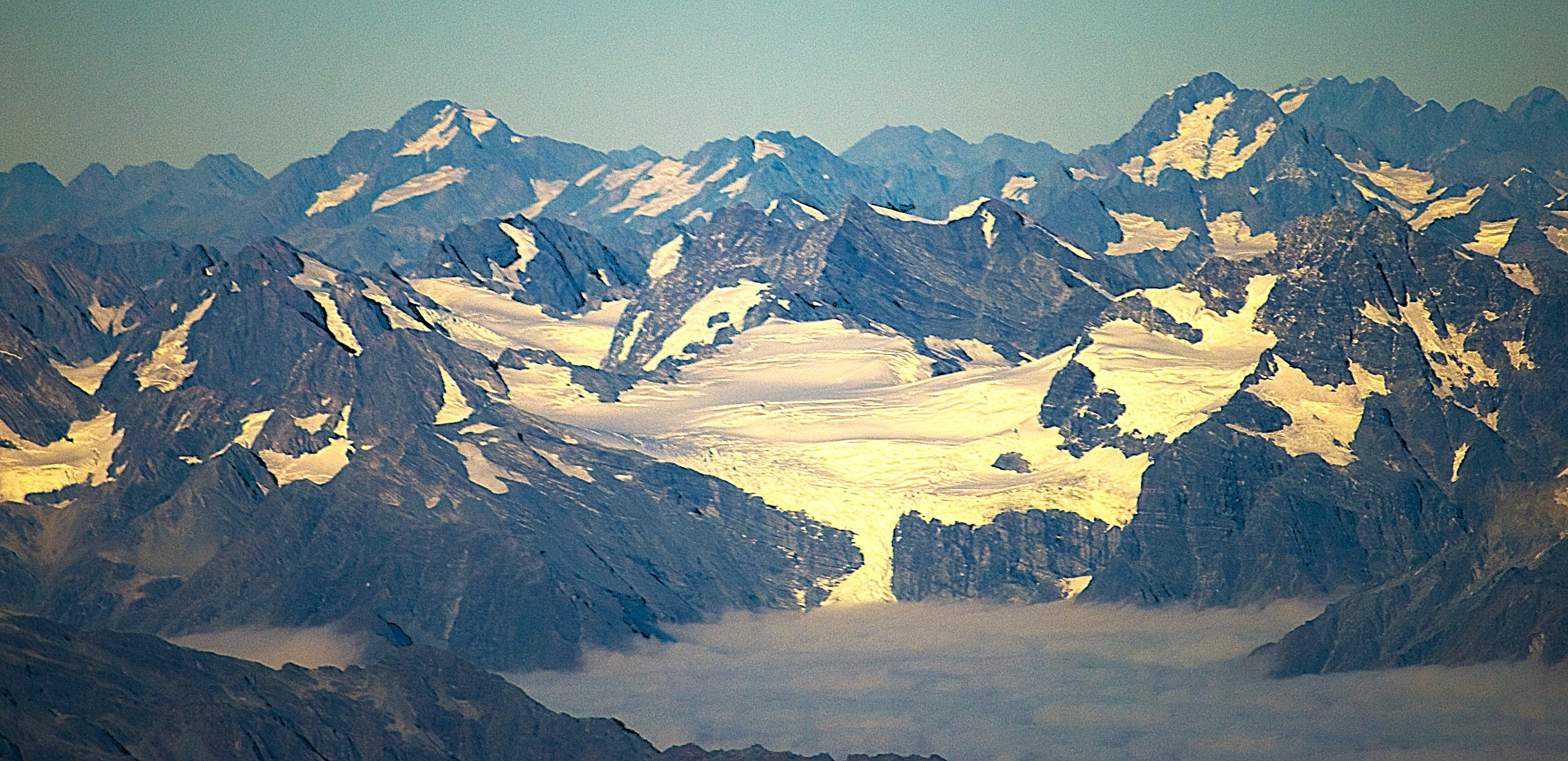
Mount Sibbald (left skyline) and Mount D'Archiac (right skyline). Aerial view from northeast.
