= Mount Achilles =

Mount Achilles may refer to:

- Mount Achilles (Tasmania), Australia
- Mount Achilles (Palmer Archipelago), Antarctica
- Mount Achilles in the Admiralty Mountains, Antarctica
- Mount Achilles in the Otago Region, New Zealand
- Achilles Peak, in the Canterbury Region, New Zealand
