= Roundhill Ski Area =

Ski field in the South Island of New Zealand

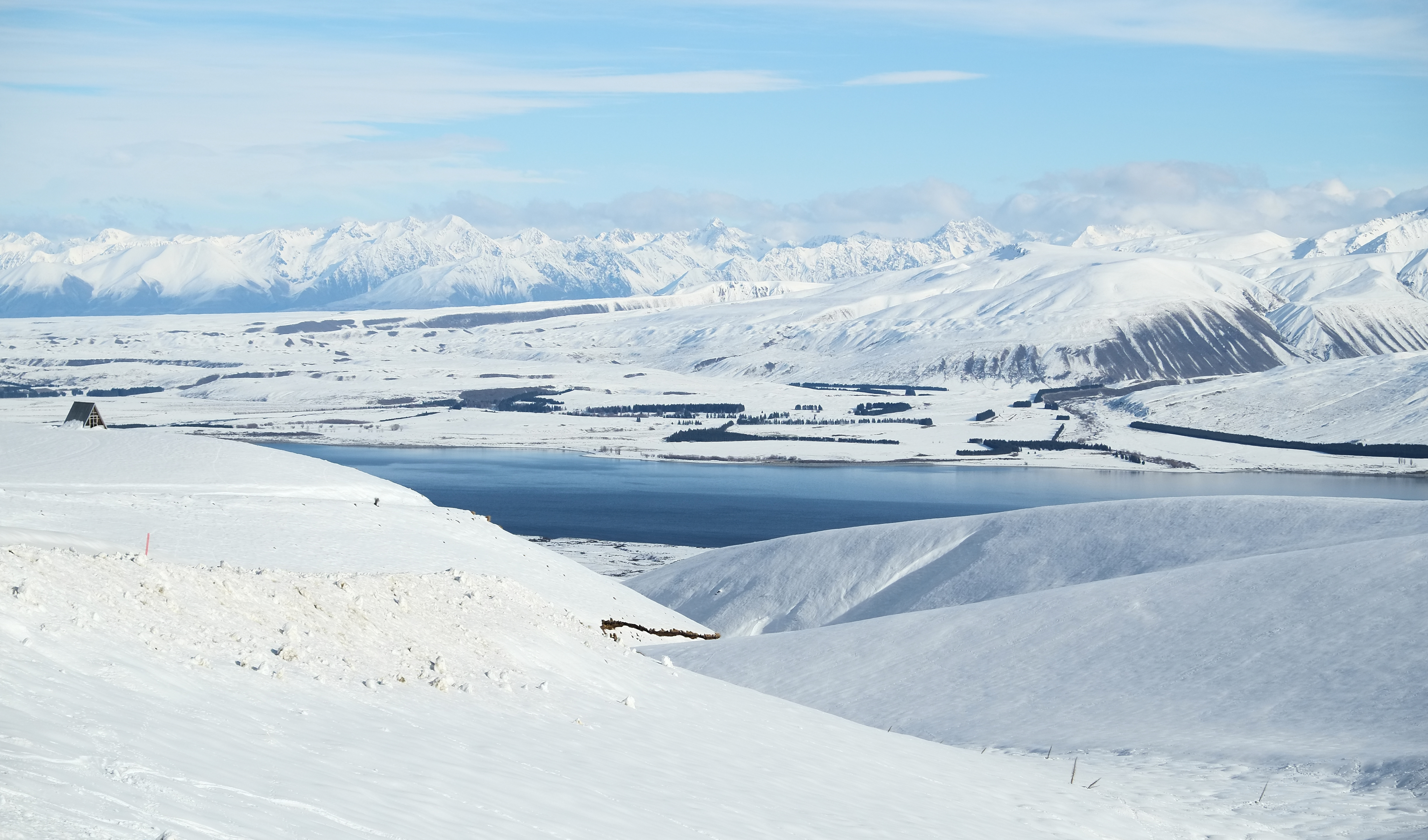
- View from ski area's car park
- Location: Lake Tekapo
- Nearest city: Timaru
- Coordinates: 43.825679°S 170.655784°E
- Vertical: 783 m (2,569 ft)
- Top elevation: 2,133 m (6,998 ft)
- Base elevation: 1,350 m (4,430 ft)
- Skiable area: 550 ha (1,400 acres)
- Trails: 14
- Lift system: 2 T-bars, 1 rope tow, 1 platter lift, 2 beginners rope tows
- Terrain parks: 1
- Snowmaking: Yes
- Night skiing: No
- Website: https://www.roundhill.co.nz/
- Location of Roundhill Ski Area showing nearby peaks in the Two Thumb Range

Roundhill Ski Area is a family owned and run ski area in Canterbury, New Zealand, in the Two Thumb Range near the town of Lake Tekapo, 1.5 hours from Timaru and 4 hours from both Christchurch and Queenstown.

The main runs are accessed by a 1.2 kilometres (0.75 miles) long T-bar (T1) and a shorter T-bar (T2). The ski area caters primarily to beginner and intermediate skiers with extensive use of two snow grooming machines. The base area is at an elevation of 1,350 metres (4,430 feet), with the T-bars reaching 1,620 metres (5,310 feet). The "Heritage Express" rope tow was added in 2010. This is a steep 1.5 km (0.93 mi) long rope tow rising 630 metres (2,070 feet) to the Richmond Ridge at 2,133 metres (6,998 feet), to give the field 783 metres (2,569 feet) of vertical drop overall; the largest in New Zealand. This opened up a large ungroomed advanced area for skilled skiers and boarders. The Heritage Express was when installed in 2010, claimed to be the longest rope tow in the world at 1,473 m (4,833 ft). In 2019 it had 6 lifts and was described as having excellent beginner and intermediate terrain with a relatively sunny and warm aspect.

== History ==
The access road and ski area was first developed in the early 1960's with The Tekapo Ski Club being founded on 25 May 1961. A commercial ski field lease occurred in 1973, with it being known as the Tekapo Ski Field before closing in 1990. The present ski field reopened in 2001. It was operated in 2019 by Tekapo Ski Field Ltd as a concession in part of Te Kahui Conservation Park. The core lease area is 860 ha (2,100 acres) and there is also a back country ski area lease of 1,520 ha (3,800 acres) without avalanche control. The ski field visitor numbers more than doubled between 2001 and 2018 with its activity contributing to the local economy.

== Round Hill ==
The ski area is on the southeastern slopes of Round Hill which has a height of 1,588 m (5,210 ft) and the south western slopes of the Richmond and Two Thumb ranges which rise to a height of 2,133 m (6,998 ft) near the ski field. The higher area is mainly scree above 1,600 m (5,200 ft). The slopes of Round Hill drain into the Coal River. In the ski run area they are covered in snow tussock Chionochloa macra and some Chionochloa rigida which is mowed on some of the ski runs to minimise the winter snow cover needed for skiing. Chionochloa macra dominates between 1,600 and 1,300 m (5,200 and 4,300 ft) descending lower on the colder south facing slopes while Chionochloa rigida dominates between 1,300 and 1,000 m (4,300 and 3,300 ft) and tends to be found higher on warmer sunny slopes. The gentle slopes used for the main ski field are related to underlying extensively oxidised greywacke while the lower western slopes of Round Hill have isolated outcrops of intensely clay altered and variably hematite stained greywacke. The East Forest Creek Fault runs along the course of the Coal River immediately to the north west of Round Hill.

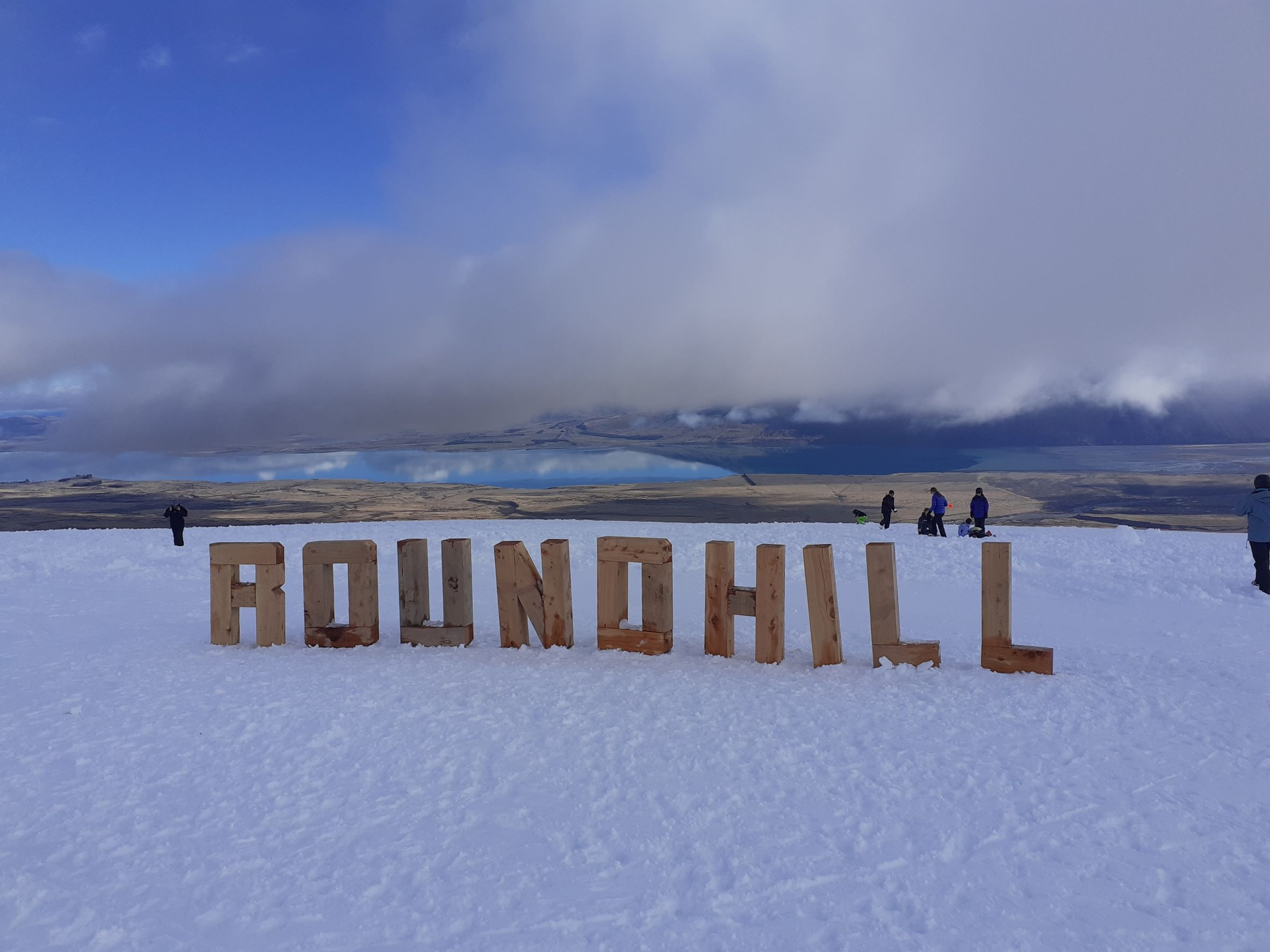
Roundhill Ski Field (July 2021)

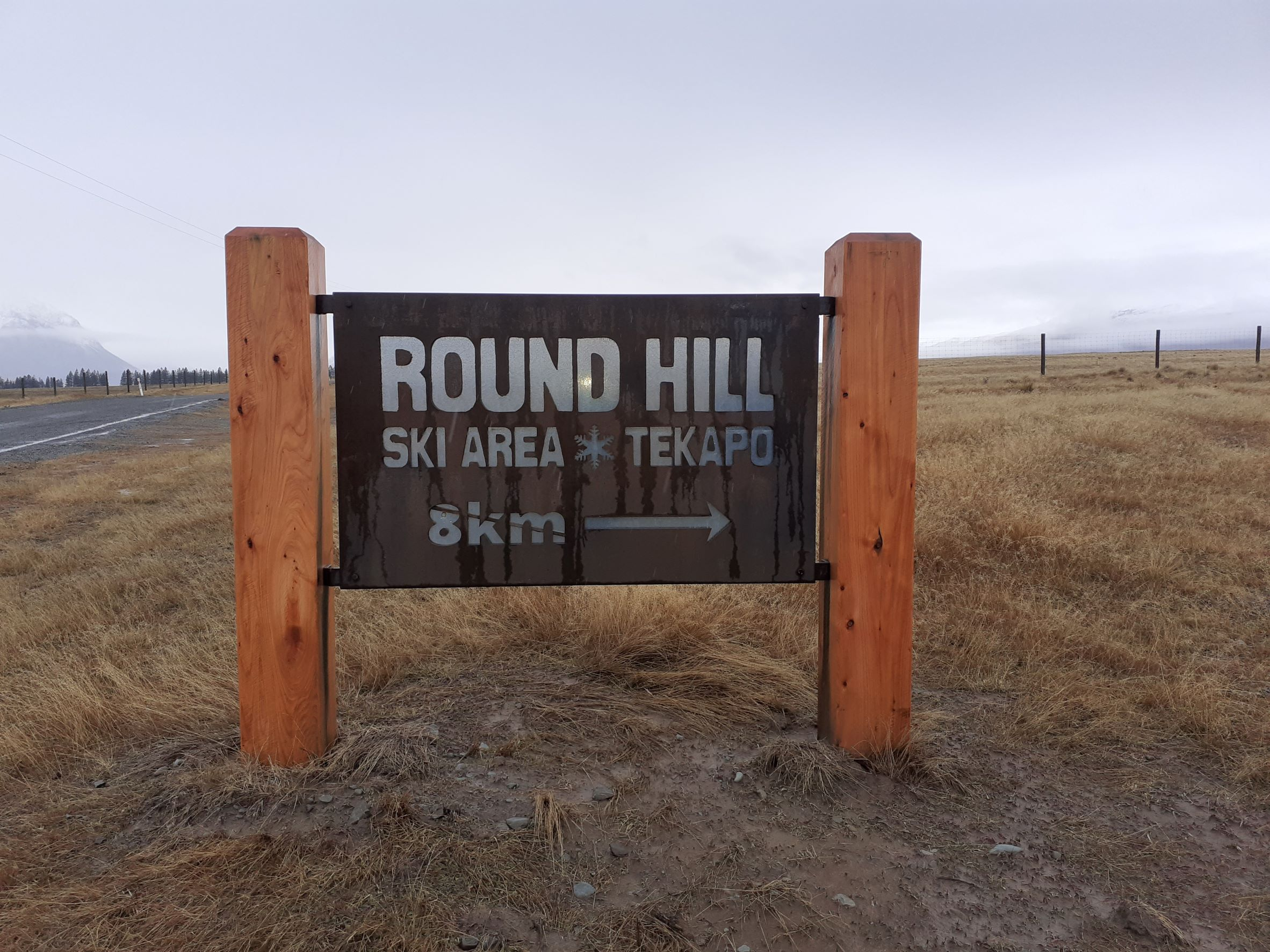
Roundhill Ski Field (July 2021)

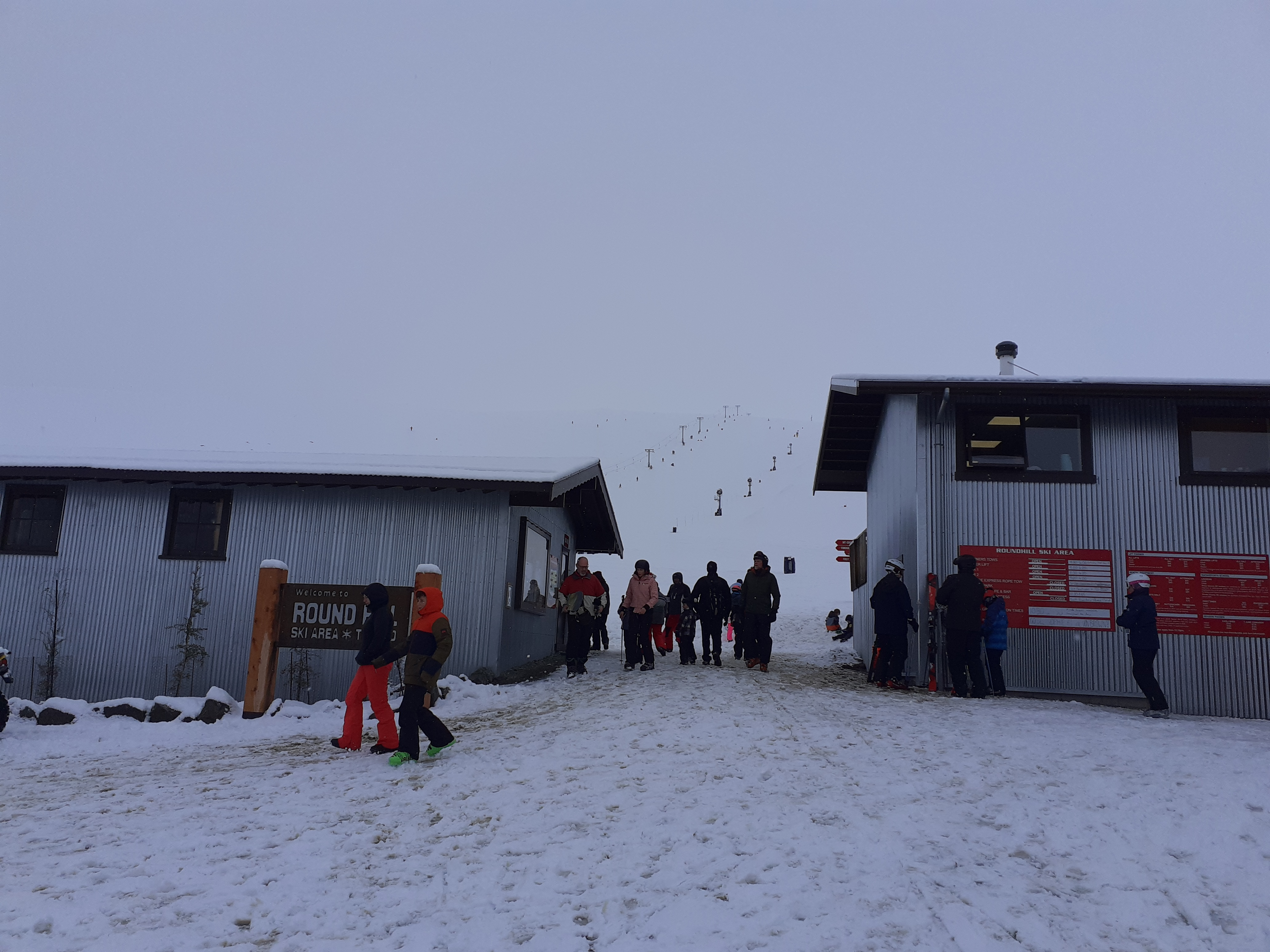
Roundhill Ski Field base buildings (July 2021)
