= Two Thumb Range =

Mountain range in New Zealand

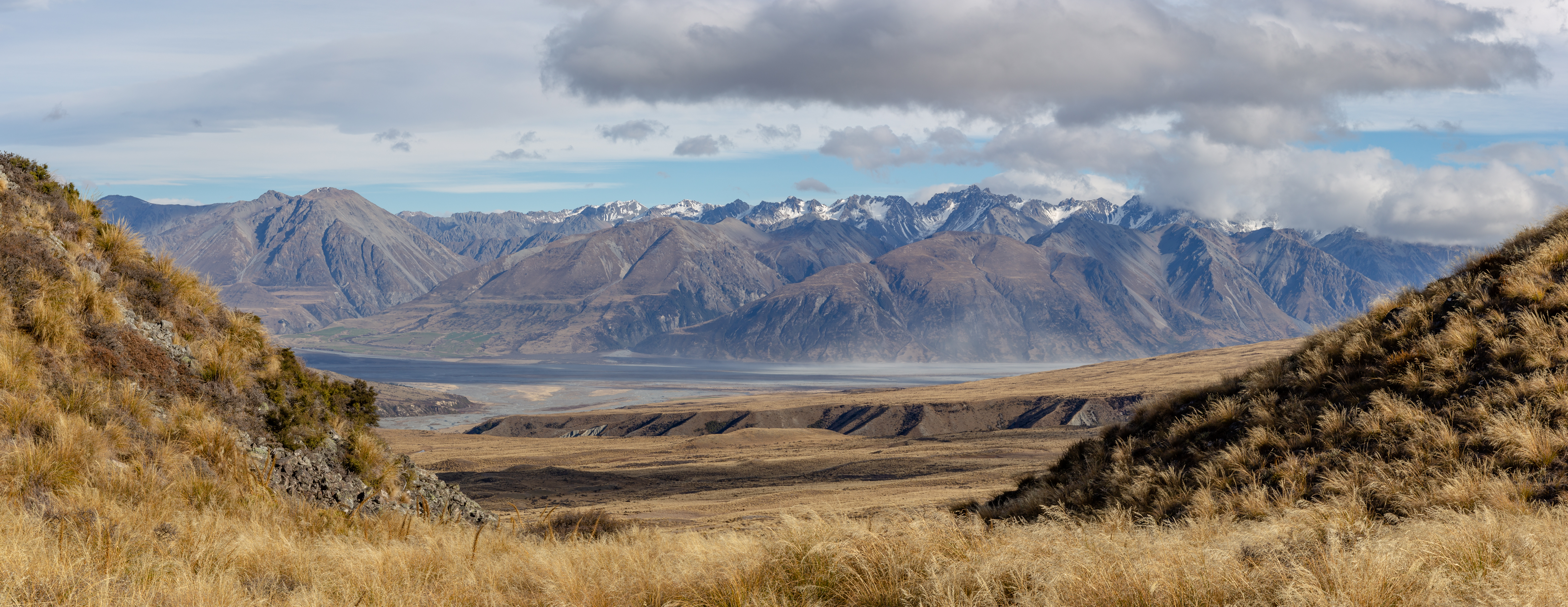
- The Two Thumb Range

Highest point
- Peak: Mount D'Archiac, 43°27′54″S 170°34′55″E
- Elevation: 2,875 m (9,432 ft)
- Coordinates: 43°27′32″S 170°36′07″E

Naming
- Defining authority: New Zealand Geographic Board

Geography
- Country: New Zealand
- Region: Canterbury

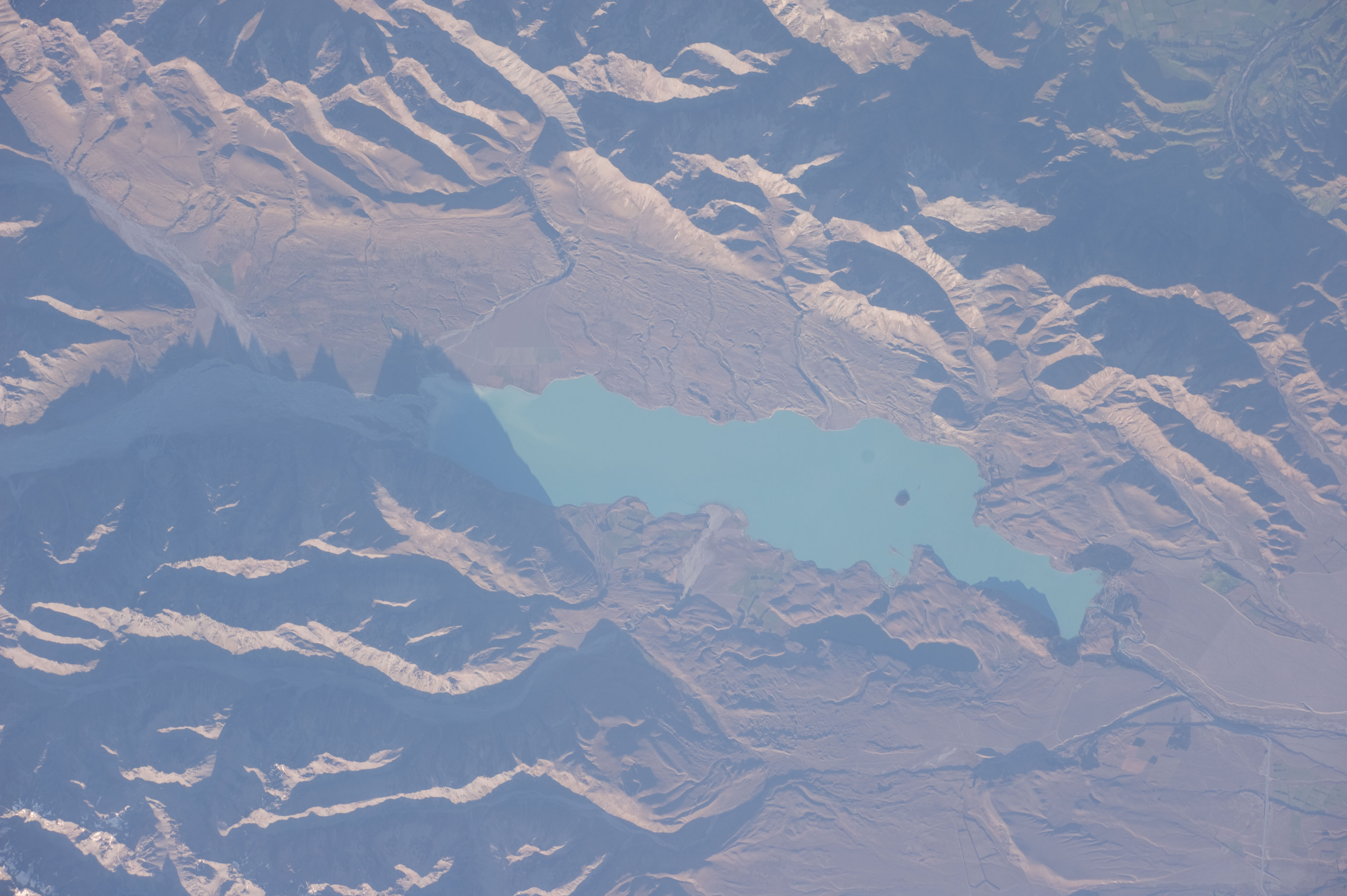
The Two Thumb Range is visible at the top (east) of this satellite view of Lake Tekapo, taken from the International Space Station.

The Two Thumb Range (sometimes called the Two Thumbs Range) is a range of mountains in the Canterbury Region of New Zealand's South Island. It is located to the east of Lake Tekapo and has several peaks which rise to around 2,500 metres (8,200 ft). The southern end of the range contains one of Canterbury's main skifields, Mount Dobson.

== Geography ==
An eastern spur of the Southern Alps, the Two Thumb Range runs in a predominantly north–south direction for approximately 45 kilometres (28 mi). It and the smaller, mostly parallel, Sibbald Range branch from the Southern Alps close to Mount D'Archaic, 40 kilometres (25 mi) northeast of Aoraki / Mount Cook. The two ranges are separated by the valley of the Macauley River and form a barrier between the valleys of the Godley River and Lake Tekapo to the west and the Rangitata River to the east. Much of the eastern side of Lake Tekapo is separated from the range by the lower Richmond Range branch. As for the Richmond Range branch of the range, several smaller ranges branch off towards the east including the Black Mountain Range from near Achilles Low Peak, and the Brabazon Range from Mount Caton. The Two Thumb Range's peaks diminish in size towards its southern end, which is immediately to the east of the town of Lake Tekapo, after which it splits into two less significant ranges, the Rollesby and Albury ranges. At the saddle between the Two Thumb Range and these ranges, State Highway 8 crosses Burkes Pass on its route between Lake Tekapo and Fairlie.

The South Opuha, Havelock, and Coal Rivers have their sources within the Two Thumb Range, as do numerous smaller watercourses, the most notable of which is Forest Creek, a tributary of the Rangitata River.

=== Peaks ===
Named Peaks in Two Thumb Range (from north to south):
Name	Height	Location
Mount D'Archiac	2,875 metres (9,432 ft)	43.465°S 170.582°E
Mount Coates	2,400 metres (7,900 ft)	43.475°S 170.589°E
Mount Earle	2,410 metres (7,910 ft)	43.483°S 170.602°E
East Sentinel	2,133 metres (6,998 ft)	43.491°S 170.629°E
Graf Spee	2,267 metres (7,438 ft)	43.542°S 170.673°E
Exeter	2,327 metres (7,635 ft)	43.554°S 170.700°E
Alma	2,510 metres (8,230 ft)	43.555°S 170.727°E
Achilles (Low Peak)	2,450 metres (8,040 ft)	43.56533°S 170.73026°E
Achilles Peak (High Peak)	2,540 metres (8,330 ft)	43.56903°S 170.72427°E
Mount Chevalier	2,404 metres (7,887 ft)	43.56908°S 170.65139°E
Myrmidon	2,474 metres (8,117 ft)	43.574°S 170.719°E
Priam	2,435 metres (7,989 ft)	43.579°S 170.718°E
Ajax Peak	2,319 metres (7,608 ft)	43.580°S 170.653°E
Tantalus	2,454 metres (8,051 ft)	43.583°S 170.712°E
The Thumbs	2,546 metres (8,353 ft)	43.593°S 170.727°E
Electra Peak	2,447 metres (8,028 ft)	43.594°S 170.716°E
Mount Ross	2,366 metres (7,762 ft)	43.596°S 170.649°E
Split Peaks	2,345 metres (7,694 ft)	43.605°S 170.737°E
Mount Caton	2,371 metres (7,779 ft)	43.613°S 170.741°E
Paris	2,175 metres (7,136 ft)	43.614°S 170.695°E
Mount Pattisson	2,313 metres (7,589 ft)	43.629°S 170.729°E
Captains Peak	2,371 metres (7,779 ft)	43.643°S 170.713°E
Mount Toby	2,222 metres (7,290 ft)	43.673°S 170.711°E
Beuzenberg Peak	2,070 metres (6,790 ft)	43.716°S 170.684°E
Mount Hope	2,086 metres (6,844 ft)	43.726°S 170.694°E
Braun-Elwert Peak	2,086 metres (6,844 ft)	43.730°S 170.692°E
Mount Gerald	1,551 metres (5,089 ft)	43.750°S 170.635°E
Neutral Hill	1,763 metres (5,784 ft)	43.767°S 170.773°E
Mount Musgrave	2,251 metres (7,385 ft)	43.802°S 170.719°E
Round Hill	1,588 metres (5,210 ft)	43.818°S 170.661°E
Mount Misery	2,305 metres (7,562 ft)	43.848°S 170.718°E
Sugar Loaf	2,305 metres (7,562 ft)	43.894°S 170.711°E
Mount Ardmore	1,989 metres (6,526 ft)	43.912°S 170.625°E
Dobson Peak	2,095 metres (6,873 ft)	43.936°S 170.670°E
Mount Maude	1,787 metres (5,863 ft)	43.981°S 170.632°E
Mount Edward	1,916 metres (6,286 ft)	44.008°S 170.598°E
Mount Burgess	1,430 metres (4,690 ft)	44.049°S 170.633°E

=== Names ===
The Thumbs twin peaks in the range have been described as "twin peaks like two giant thumbs … a famous mid-Canterbury landmark." The names of several of the range's peaks, including Achilles Peak, Exeter, and Graf Spee, commemorate New Zealand's involvement in the Battle of the River Plate. There may be potential confusion over the names as for example Achilles Peak is the official name, for the highest peak of Achilles, where Achilles is an unofficial name, located as the saddle between two peaks, that are called High and Low peaks. Further there is a Mount Achilles in Otago. Mount D'Archiac was named by Julius von Haast after the Adolphe d'Archiac.

=== Geology ===
Torlesse Composite Terrane rocks form the basement and range in age from the Jurassic near the Southern Alps to Permian in the east. Most of the Two Thumb Range consists of unfoliated metagreywackes, with areas of pumpellyite-actinolite.

There is current and Quaternary displacement east of the Alpine Fault that has been ongoing for less than 5 million years that has resulted in uplift of the Two Thumb Range. The northern range is uplifting as part of the Southern Alps while distinct faulting structures are known in the southern portion. To the east of the ranges are two series of north-striking Fox Peak faults and to the west the northeast-striking Forest Creek faults that parallel the Alpine Fault at about the Mount Musgrave level in the southern range. A fault is inferred to separate the Round Hill area from the rest of the ranges. It has been postulated that the southern Two Thumb Range has uplifted about 2 km (1.2 mi) in the last 1.5 to 2 million years.

== Recreation ==
Dobson Peak and its surrounding terrain are the home of the Mount Dobson skifield. The smaller Roundhill Ski Area is also located within the range.

New Zealand's major north-to-south walking track, Te Araroa Trail, crosses the Rangitata River before following the valley of a tributary, Bush Stream, into the Two Thumb Range. It crosses the range at Stag Saddle — the trail's highest point at 1,925 metres (6,316 ft) — immediately to the north of Mount Hope, before following the eastern shore of Lake Tekapo south.

== In popular culture ==
The Two Thumb Range was the setting for Desmond Bagley's 1975 novel, The Snow Tiger.
