= South Opuha River =

Coordinates: 43.995377°S 170.858135°E

Location
- Country: New Zealand

Physical characteristics
- Source
  - location: Two Thumb Range
- Mouth
  - location: Opuha Lake
- Length: 30 km (19 mi)

The South Opuha River is a river of the Canterbury region of New Zealand's South Island. It flows south down a valley between the Two Thumb Range and the Sherwood Range from its origins northwest of Mount Misery before turning southeast around the southern end of the Sherwood Range to reach the western shore of Opuha Lake, of which it is a major inflow.

== See also ==
- List of rivers of New Zealand
