= Mistake River =

Coordinates: 43°50′S 170°30′E

Location
- Country: New Zealand

Physical characteristics
- Source
  - location: Hall Range
- Mouth
  - location: Lake Tekapo
- Length: 23 km (14 mi)

The Mistake River is a river of the Canterbury region of New Zealand's South Island. It flows south from the Hall Range to the northwest of Lake Tekapo, turning east at the southern end of the range to flow into the western edge of the lake.

== See also ==
- List of rivers of New Zealand
