= Mount Dobson =

Ski field in the South Island of New Zealand

Dobson Peak
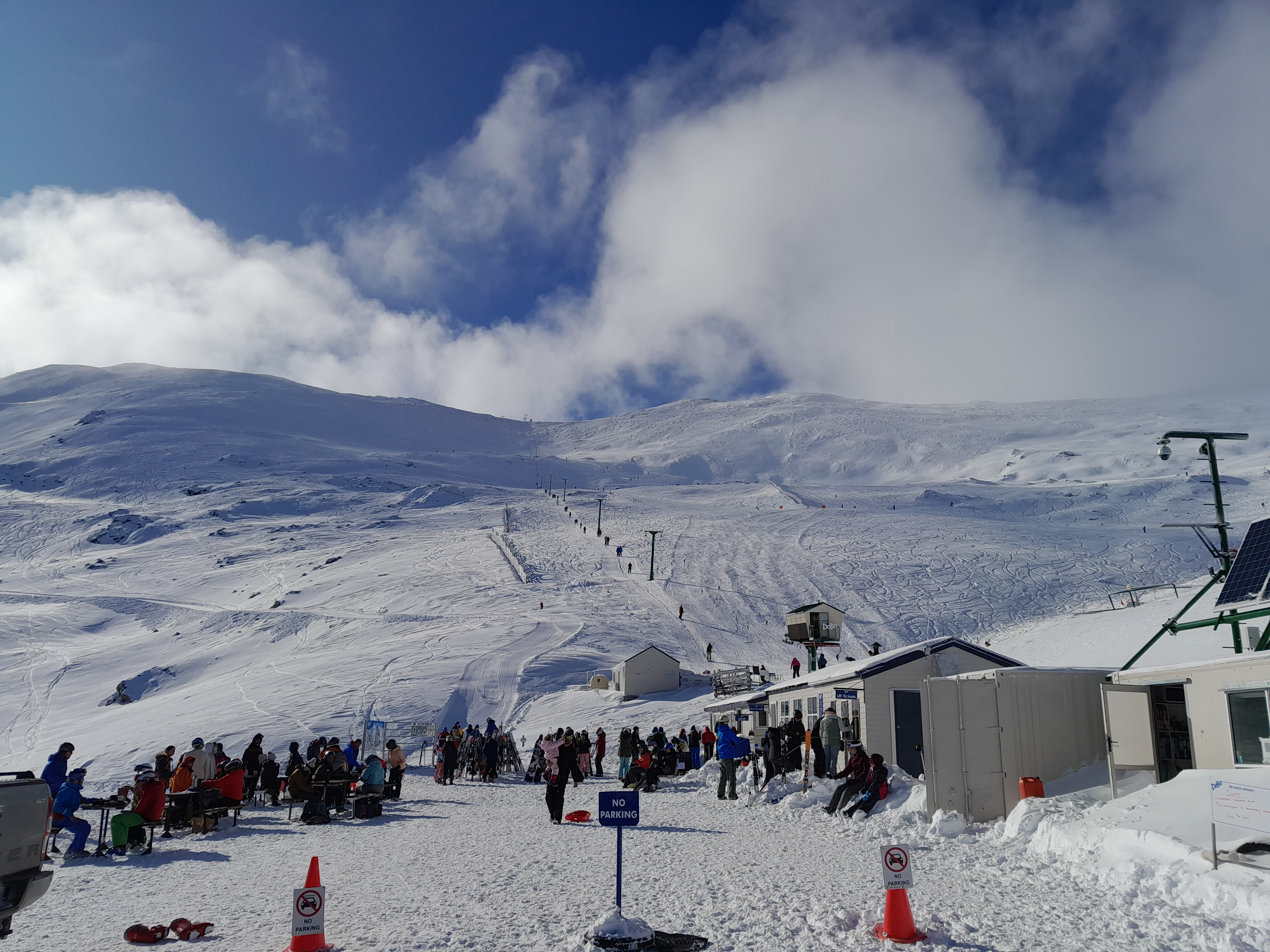
- Dobson Peak from base of Mt Dobson Ski Field

Highest point
- Elevation: 2,095 m (6,873 ft)
- Coordinates: 43°56′10″S 170°40′12″E

Naming
- Nickname(s): Mount Dobson, Mt Dobson
- Defining authority: New Zealand Geographic Board

Geography
- Location of Dobson Peak (red triangle) showing nearby peaks in the Two Thumb Range
- Country: New Zealand
- Region: South Canterbury
- Settlement: Fairlie
- Range coordinates: 43°27′32″S 170°36′07″E
- Parent range: Two Thumb Range

Climbing
- Access: State Highway 8

Mt Dobson Ski Field Area
- Interactive map of Mt Dobson Ski Field Area
- Nearest city: Christchurch
- Coordinates: 43°56′40″S 170°39′50″E
- Top elevation: 2,018 m (6,621 ft)
- Base elevation: 1,725 m (5,659 ft)
- Skiable area: 350 ha (860 acres)
- Trails: 14
- Lift system: 4 Lifts
- Snowmaking: Yes
- Night skiing: No
- Website: mtdobson.co.nz

Mount Dobson is the common name for Dobson Peak as a result of being used for the name of a ski area near Fairlie in South Canterbury, South Island of New Zealand. There is an official Mount Dobson being 702 m (2,303 ft) high at the northern end of the South Island in Marlborough District between Blenheim and Picton, and an unofficial Mount Dobson in the Southern Alps at 2,265 m (7,431 ft) only a short distance due west. Accordingly, confusion could arise.

== Dobson Peak ==
The peak after which the ski field is named, is officially called Dobson Peak, and rises to 2,095 metres (6,873 feet) just north of the ski field. It is to the southern end of the Two Thumb Range. The semi-schist of the Torlesse Composite Terrane is basement in the area, and to the peak's east are the lower traces of the Fox Peak faults which may have been last active just before European settlement. The higher reaches about the 2,000 m (6,600 ft) mark or outside the ski field are essentially a boulderfield.

== Recreation ==
=== Ski Resort ===
Mt Dobson ski area is located near Tekapo, in the southern Te Kahui Kaupeka Conservation Park, and features four lifts being a triple chair lift, a T-bar, a Platter lift and a beginner's ski tow, serving 14 trails over an area of 350 hectares (860 acres). The resort caters primarily to skiers of intermediate ability, with a 1:2:1 ratio of beginner/intermediate/advanced slopes.

The resort is situated in a 3 km (1.9 mi) wide treeless bowl, facing south west between Fairlie and Tekapo. Other features include a natural half pipe, and groomed main trails. There is no accommodation at the resort, and visitors are directed to nearby Fairlie.

==== History ====
Construction of the 15 km (9.3 mi) access road to the ski basin started in 1976 and the Mt Dobson Ski Area opened in 1979. It operated under a special licence from the New Zealand Department of Conservation until 1987 and then under concessions. The ski field was put up for sale on the 22nd of October 2014, but ownership continued with Mount Dobson Ski Area Ltd who had access to 1,050.5 ha (2,596 acres) via lease and recreation permits. A concession license reduced this to 350 ha (860 acres) in 2021.

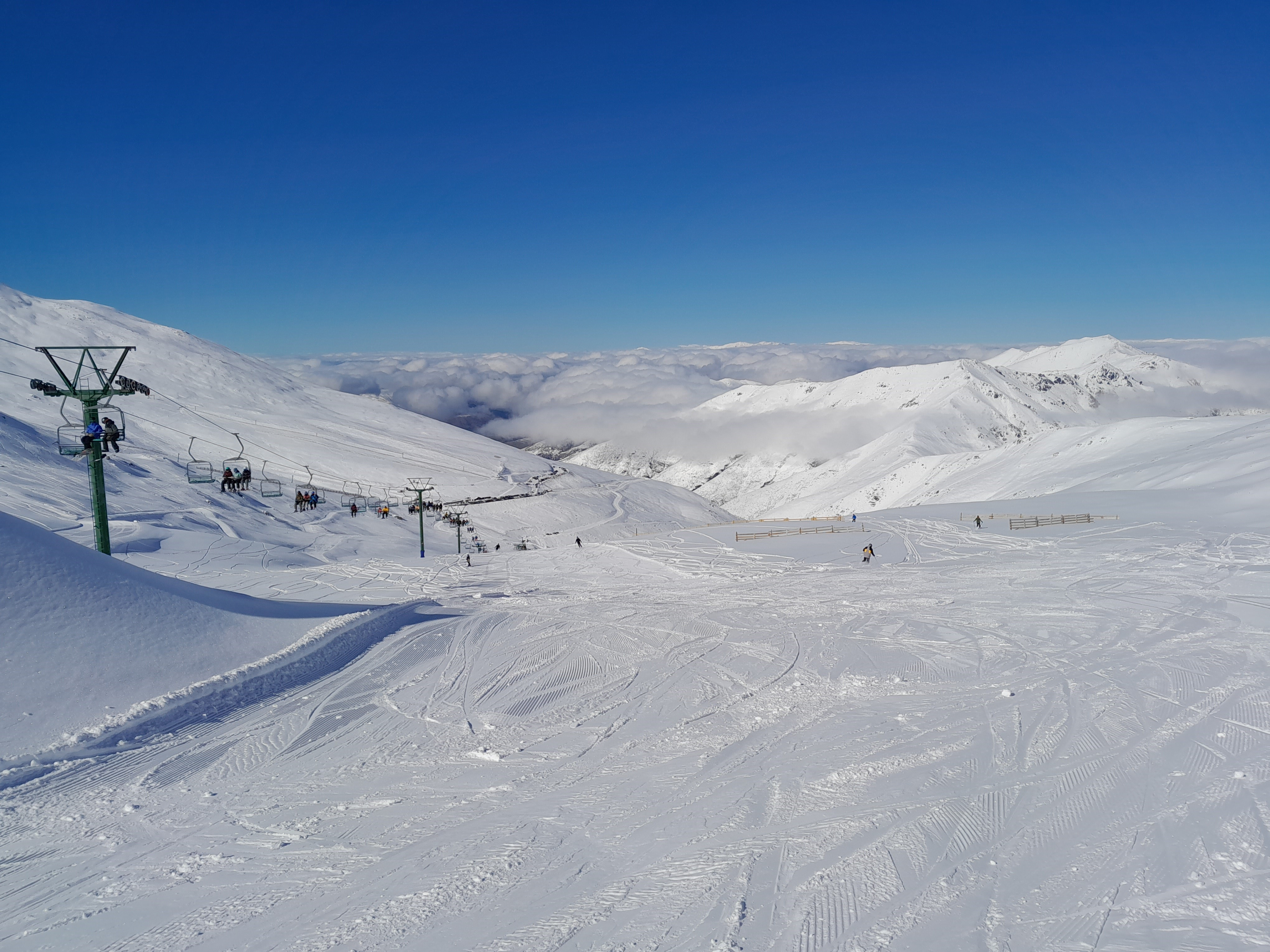
Dobson Peak, from the top of the chairlift (2023)

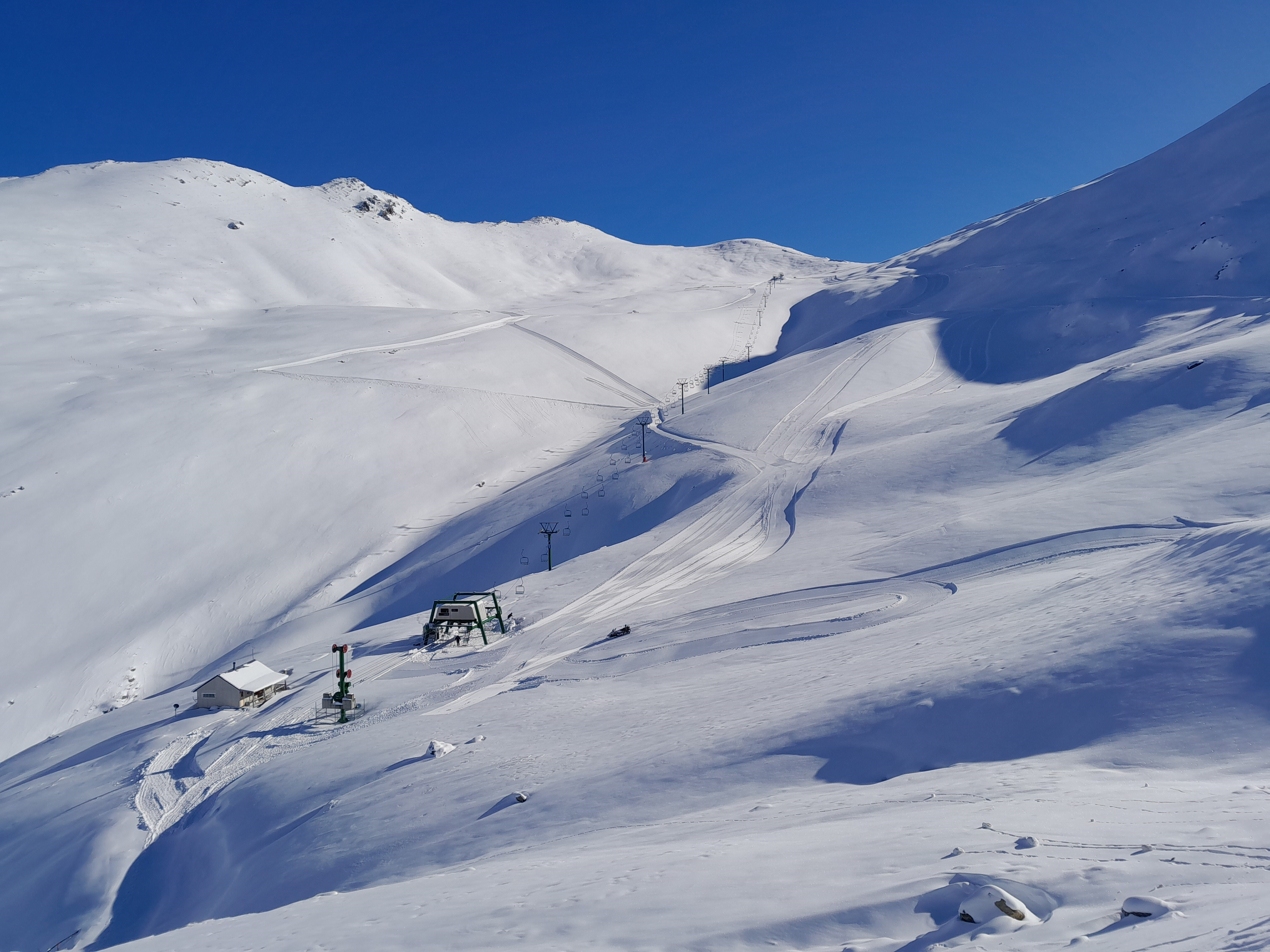
Mt Dobson skifield (2023)

=== Hunting ===
To the south of the ski field, and distinct from it, but accessed via its access road, is a 2,436 ha (6,020 acres) area of tussock, shrub and mountain totara forest at low elevations and snow tussock and alpine herb fields higher of the Te Kahui Kaupeka Conservation Park available for hunting. Red and fallow deer, chamois, tahr and wallabies may be hunted with a permit.

== Ecology ==
The mountain top boulderfield is virtually unvegetated except for occasional alpine cushions of speargrass species, being the native source of hebes such as Veronica pinguifolia, vegetable sheep, South Island edelweiss, and scree willowherb (Epilobium porphyrium, E. pycnostachum) amongst other alpine plants.

Tussock species, the mountain strap-leaved daisy, sedge and hebes are found on the higher ski runs.

Tall tussockland is largely confined to between 1,800 and 1,680 m (5,910 and 5,510 ft) on the western side of the peak but is more extensive on the north-east facing slopes between 1,600 and 1,480 m (5,250 and 4,860 ft).

Low alpine herbfields with a wide variety of native New Zealand species are found on the lower slopes where there is water seepage and adjacent to the draining streams.

Below the ski field there are areas of montane exotic grassland and native shrubland and woodland. This includes habitats occupied by the introduced mammals mentioned in the hunting section and other pests such as opossum and hares.

Kea were found until about 1990. It is likely that the insect and lizard communities are representative of those studies have found elsewhere in the Two Thumb Range.

Exotic weeds keep being introduced along the access road and such like thistle, gorse or lodgepole pine need to be managed by active eradication.
