= Te Kahui Kaupeka Conservation Park =

Protected area in New Zealand

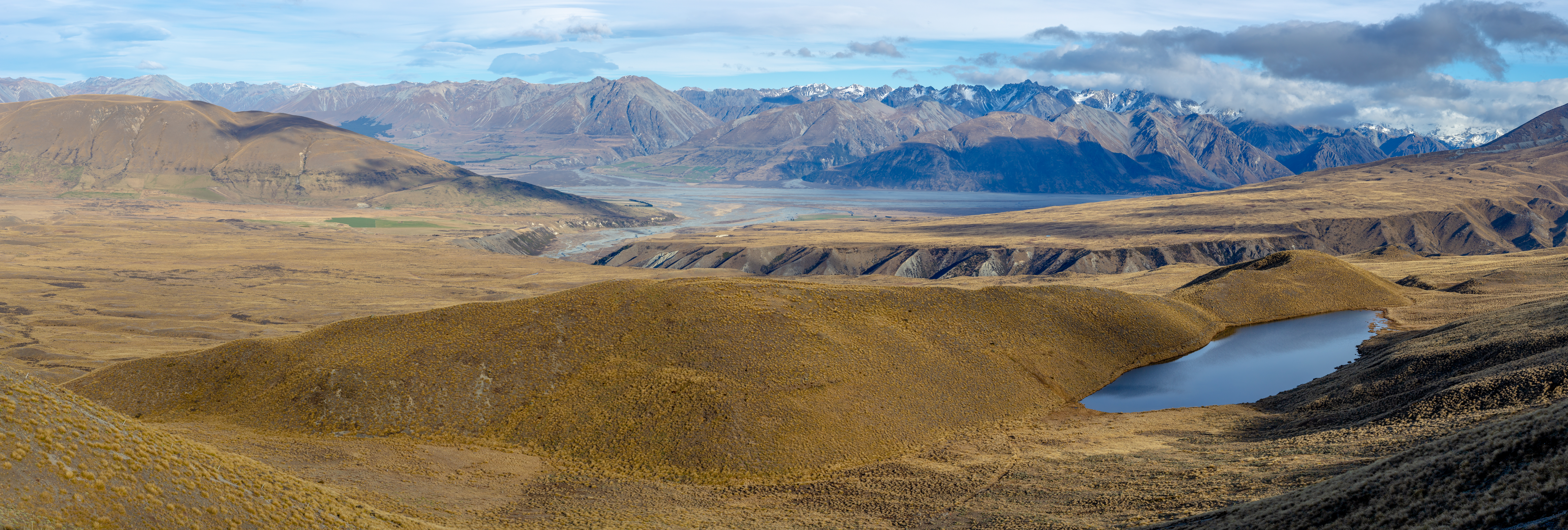
- Two Thumb Range

- Location within New Zealand
- Location: New Zealand
- Coordinates: 43.618432°S 170.895629°E
- Area: 94,033 hectares (232,360 acres)
- Established: 2008
- Governing body: Department of Conservation

Te Kahui Kaupeka Conservation Park is a protected area in the Timaru District and Canterbury Region of New Zealand's South Island.

The park is managed by the New Zealand Department of Conservation.

== Geography ==
The park covers 94,033 hectares (232,360 acres).

== History ==
The park was established in 2008.
