= Macaulay River =

River in New Zealand

Coordinates: 43°44′S 170°33′E

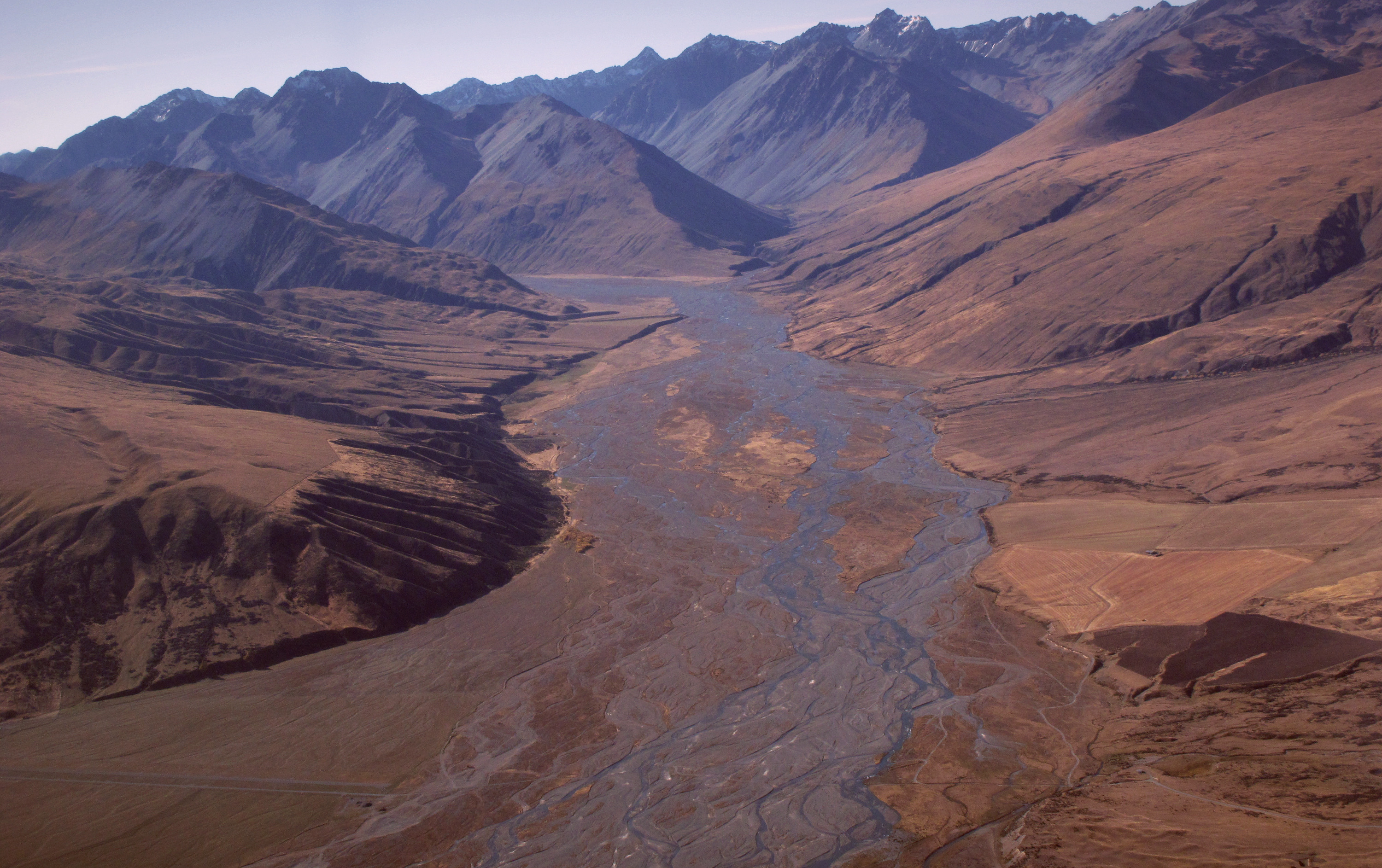
- Macaulay River flowing down towards the Godley River

Location
- Country: New Zealand

Physical characteristics
- Source
  - location: Two Thumb Range
- Mouth
  - location: Lake Tekapo
- Length: 38 km (24 mi)

The Macaulay River is a braided river of the Mackenzie Country of New Zealand's South Island. It flows south from the Two Thumb Range, part of the Southern Alps, its valley merging with that of the Godley River shortly before it enters the northern end of Lake Tekapo.

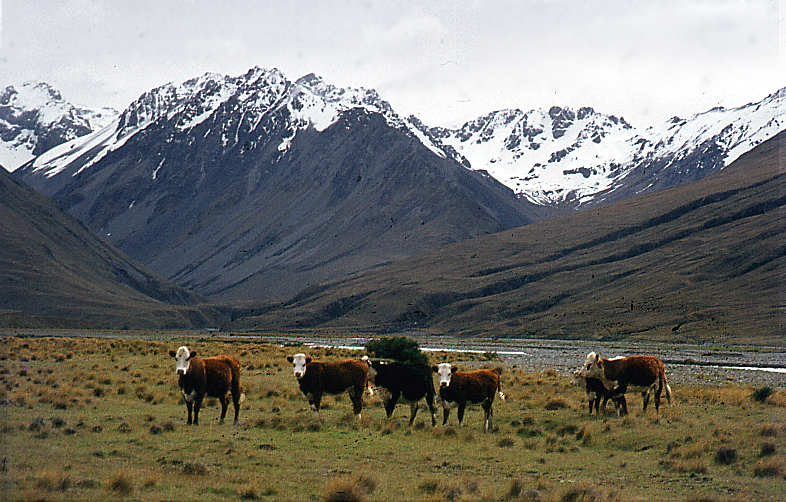
Hereford cattle grazing in the Macaulay River valley

The Macauley River is accessible to the public on foot, horse, mountain bike, and 4x4 vehicles. Macaulay Hut is located at the Northern end of the river and provides 14 bunks.

== See also ==
- List of rivers of New Zealand
