= Lake Tekapo =

Lake in the South Island of New Zealand

Coordinates: 43°53′S 170°31′E

- Takapō (Māori)
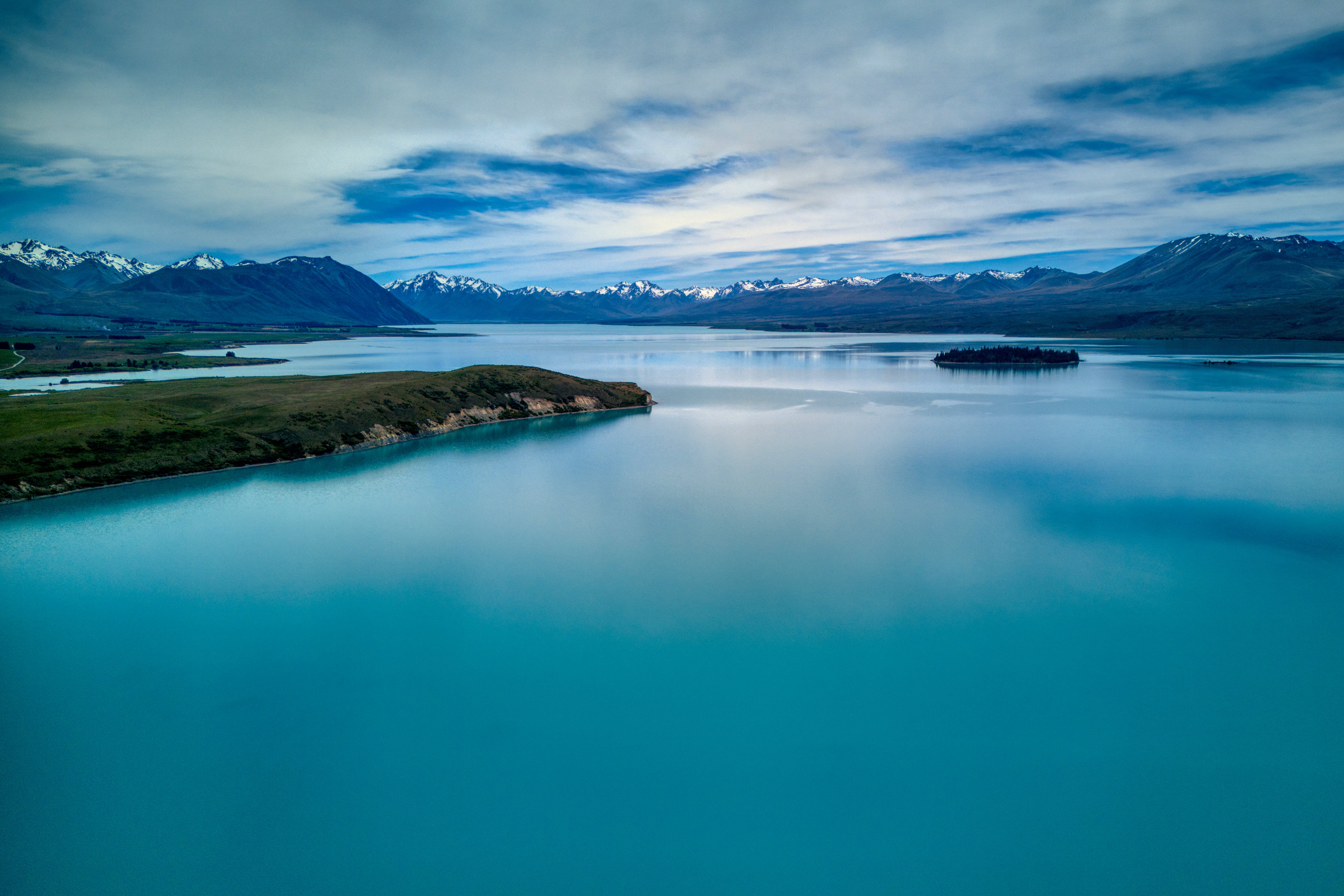

- Location within New Zealand
- Interactive map of Lake Tekapo
- Location: Mackenzie District, Canterbury region, South Island
- Primary inflows: Godley River (north), Macauley River (north), Mistake River (west), Cass River (west)
- Primary outflows: Tekapo River
- Catchment area: 1,463 km^{2} (565 sq mi)
- Max. length: 27 km (17 mi)
- Max. width: 6 km (3.7 mi) (max), 3.5 kilometres (2.2 mi) (mean)
- Surface area: 87 km^{2} (34 sq mi) (summer), 82 km^{2} (32 sq mi) (winter),
- Average depth: 69 m (226 ft)
- Max. depth: 120 m (390 ft)
- Water volume: 6 km^{3} (4.9×10^{6} acre⋅ft)
- Surface elevation: 710 m (2,330 ft)

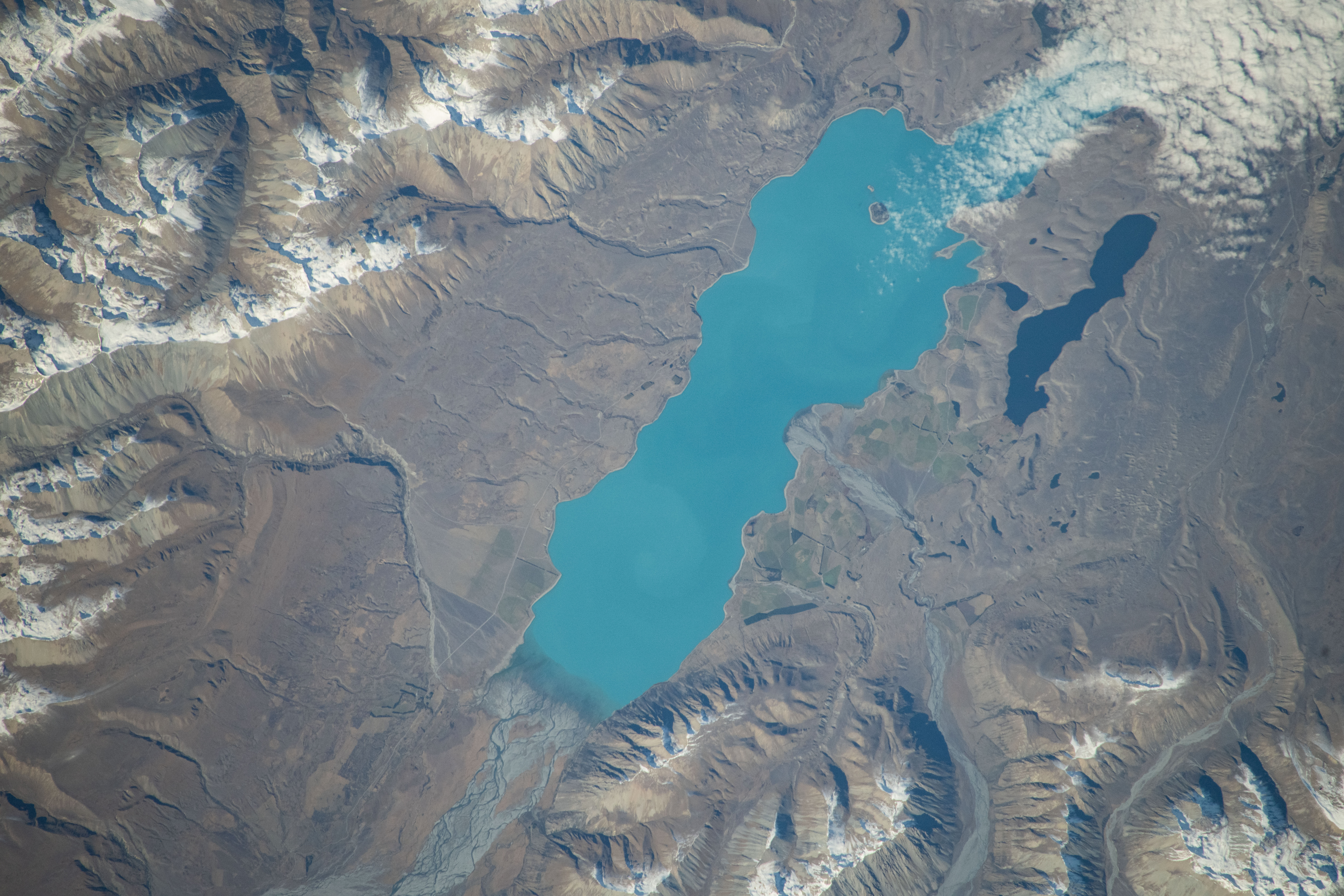
Lake Tekapo viewed from the International Space Station (5 May 2024)

Lake Tekapo (Māori: Takapō) is the second-largest of three roughly parallel lakes running north–south along the northern edge of the Mackenzie Basin in the South Island of New Zealand (the others are Lake Pukaki and Lake Ōhau). It covers an area of 83 km^{2} (32 sq mi) and is at an altitude of 710 m (2,330 ft) above sea level.

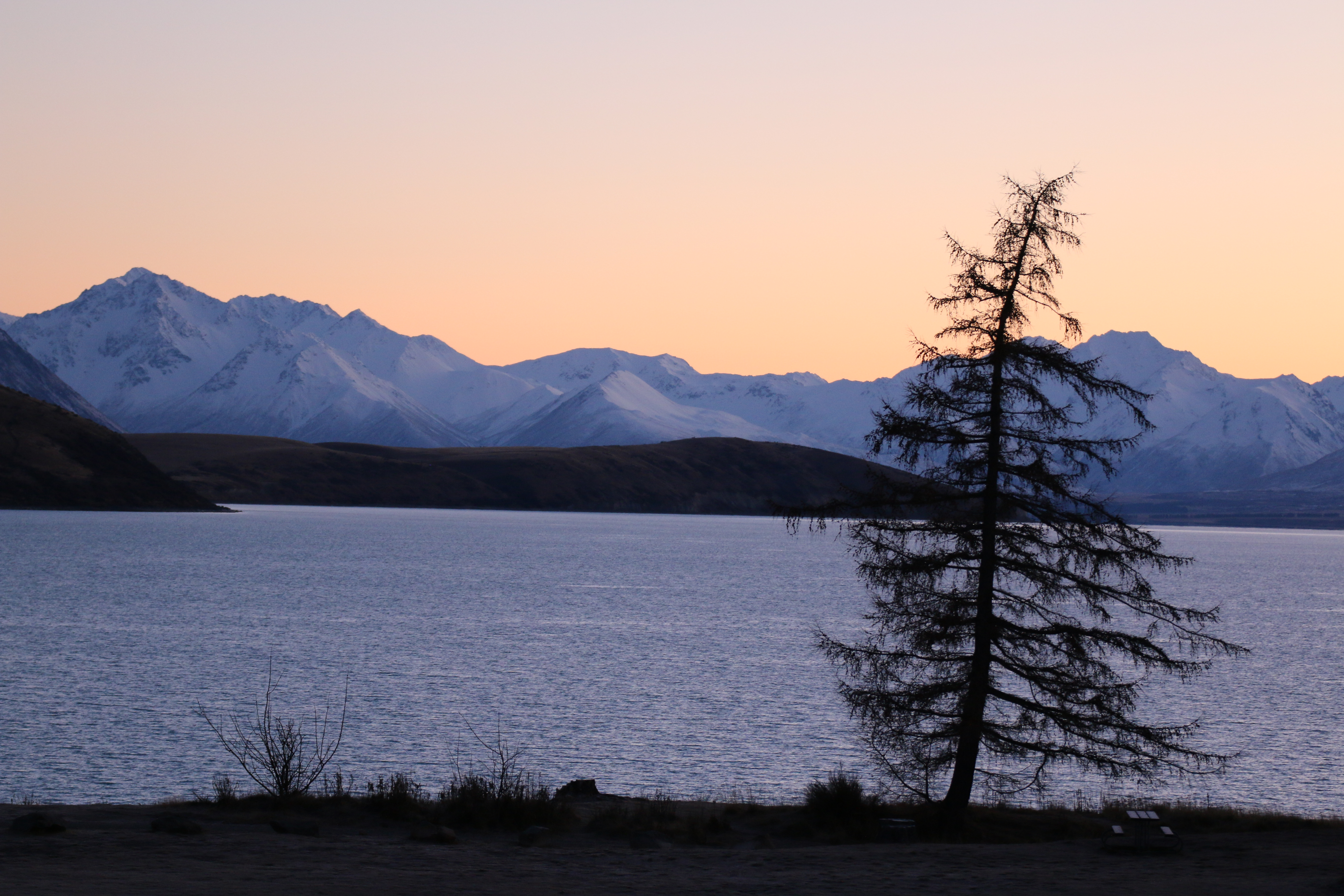
Lake Tekapo in the twilight

== In Māori culture ==
"Tekapo" is a misspelling of Takapō, the name of the lake in the Māori language. Takapō means "to leave in haste at night".

In 2021, the Mackenzie District Council announced that it will start using the dual names of Tekapo and Takapō when referring to Lake Tekapo.

According to Ngāi Tahu mythology, Lake Tekapo is one of the lakes dug by the Waitaha explorer Rākaihautū using his Polynesian digging stick, which was called Tūwhakaroria. After arriving in the Uruao waka at Nelson, Rākaihautū divided his people into two groups. Rākaihautū led his group down the middle of the island, digging the South Island freshwater lakes. His son, Rakihouia, led the other group down the east coast of the South Island.

=== Motuariki island ===
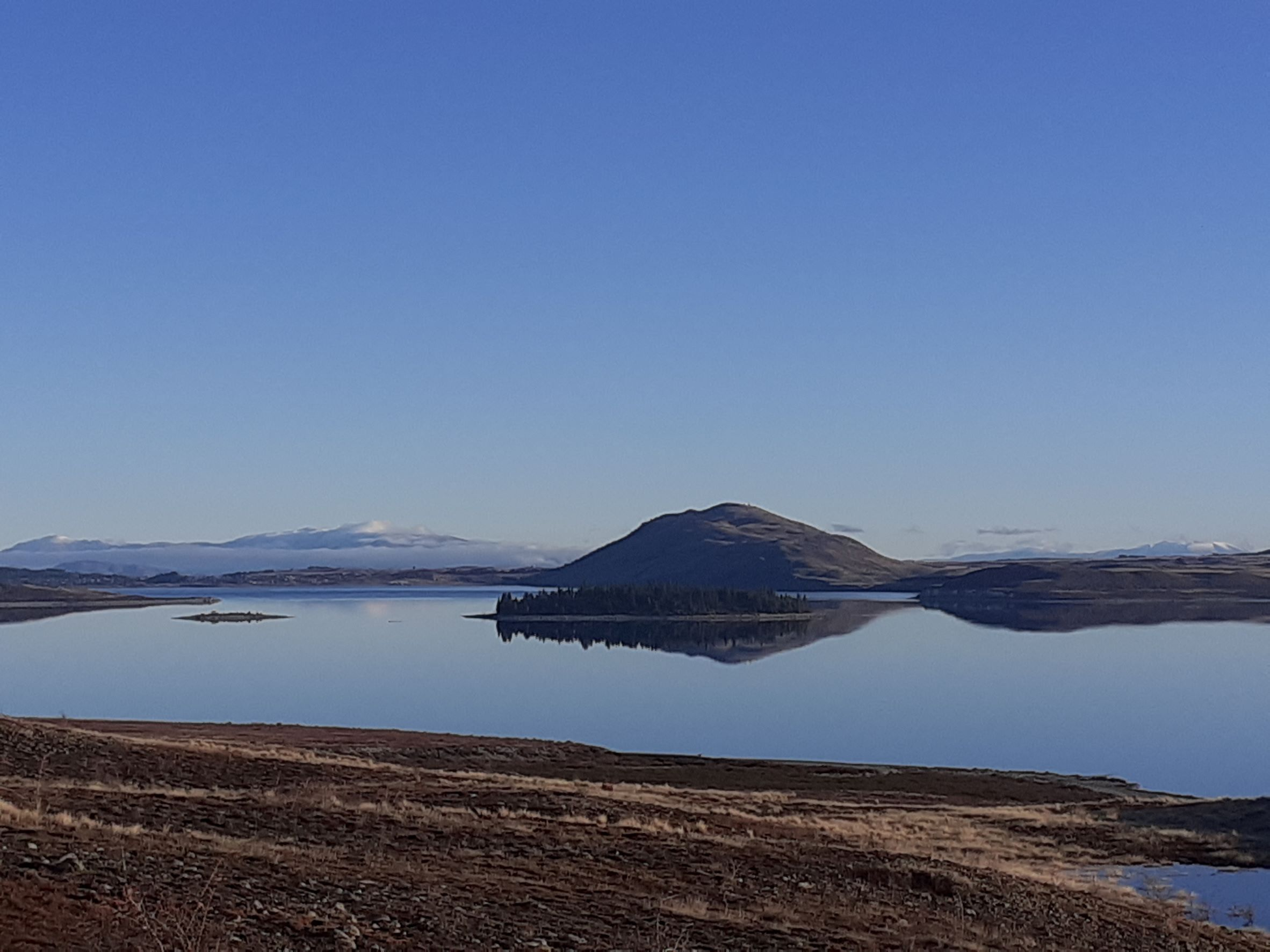
Motuariki island, Lake Tekapo

Motuariki is a small island in the middle of Lake Tekapo. The legends of Ngāi Tahu tell of Motuariki, who was an ancestor of the Āraiteuru waka that capsized near Shag Point on the Otago coastline. After the waka capsized, many of the passengers went ashore to explore the land. Legend states that they needed to be back at the waka before daylight. Many did not make it, including Motuariki, and he was instead transformed into the island of Motuariki.

== Geography ==
The lake covers an area of 83 km^{2} (32 sq mi) and is at an altitude of 710 m (2,330 ft) above sea level. It is fed at its northern end by both the braided Godley River and Macaulay River, which have their sources in the Southern Alps to the north. The meltwater from the Southern Alps is tinged with a light turquoise colour from the glacial silt. This gives Lake Tekapo its distinctive colour. To the east of Lake Tekapo lies the Two Thumb Range with Mount Toby (2,222 m); Braun Elwert Peak (2,086 m); Dobson Peak (2,095 m) and Mount Maude (1,797 m) amongst the mountains overlooking Lake Tekapo. On the western side of Lake Tekapo. Mount John (1,031 m) is closest to the town with Lake Alexandrina further north and Mistake Peak (1,931 m) sitting towards the head of the lake. Cowans Hill (783m) lies at the southern end of Lake Tekapo behind the township and next to the Tekapo River.

The average water temperature on the surface of the lake varies between a low of 5.8 to 5.9 °C in September and a high of 17 °C in January.

The lake is a popular tourist destination, and several resort hotels are located in the township of Lake Tekapo at the lake's southern end. The Lake Tekapo Regional Park, administered by Environment Canterbury, is located on the lake's southern shore. State Highway 8 runs past Lake Tekapo at its southern end.

On a clear day, the taller snow-capped peaks of Aoraki / Mount Cook National Park are visible from Lake Tekapo.

An astronomical observatory is located at Mount John, which is to the north of the town, and south of the small Lake Alexandrina.

=== Climate ===
Lake Tekapo is one of the sunniest places in New Zealand with annual sunshine hours averaging more than 2,400 each year.

Climate data for Lake Tekapo, elevation 762 m (2,500 ft), (1991–2020 normals, extremes 1925–present)
Month	Jan	Feb	Mar	Apr	May	Jun	Jul	Aug	Sep	Oct	Nov	Dec	Year
Record high °C (°F)	35.0 (95.0)	34.0 (93.2)	30.7 (87.3)	26.1 (79.0)	22.2 (72.0)	18.5 (65.3)	17.6 (63.7)	21.9 (71.4)	24.8 (76.6)	26.1 (79.0)	28.3 (82.9)	30.6 (87.1)	35.0 (95.0)
Mean maximum °C (°F)	30.4 (86.7)	29.2 (84.6)	26.4 (79.5)	22.2 (72.0)	17.8 (64.0)	14.9 (58.8)	12.8 (55.0)	15.2 (59.4)	19.8 (67.6)	22.4 (72.3)	25.5 (77.9)	27.3 (81.1)	31.2 (88.2)
Mean daily maximum °C (°F)	22.2 (72.0)	22.2 (72.0)	19.5 (67.1)	15.3 (59.5)	11.5 (52.7)	7.4 (45.3)	6.6 (43.9)	8.8 (47.8)	12.4 (54.3)	15.2 (59.4)	17.3 (63.1)	20.1 (68.2)	14.9 (58.8)
Daily mean °C (°F)	15.4 (59.7)	15.2 (59.4)	12.7 (54.9)	9.4 (48.9)	6.4 (43.5)	2.7 (36.9)	1.9 (35.4)	3.8 (38.8)	6.7 (44.1)	9.0 (48.2)	10.9 (51.6)	13.4 (56.1)	9.0 (48.2)
Mean daily minimum °C (°F)	8.5 (47.3)	8.2 (46.8)	6.0 (42.8)	3.5 (38.3)	1.4 (34.5)	−1.9 (28.6)	−2.8 (27.0)	−1.2 (29.8)	1.0 (33.8)	2.8 (37.0)	4.5 (40.1)	6.8 (44.2)	3.1 (37.6)
Mean minimum °C (°F)	1.0 (33.8)	2.1 (35.8)	−0.3 (31.5)	−2.4 (27.7)	−4.0 (24.8)	−7.8 (18.0)	−8.6 (16.5)	−7.4 (18.7)	−4.1 (24.6)	−4.0 (24.8)	−1.8 (28.8)	0.5 (32.9)	−10.5 (13.1)
Record low °C (°F)	−3.2 (26.2)	−2.2 (28.0)	−5.1 (22.8)	−6.5 (20.3)	−11.1 (12.0)	−15.6 (3.9)	−14.8 (5.4)	−13.8 (7.2)	−10.1 (13.8)	−8.3 (17.1)	−5.3 (22.5)	−7.0 (19.4)	−15.6 (3.9)
Average rainfall mm (inches)	38.1 (1.50)	42.2 (1.66)	29.2 (1.15)	51.0 (2.01)	71.6 (2.82)	52.1 (2.05)	50.3 (1.98)	38.2 (1.50)	33.8 (1.33)	44.9 (1.77)	42.3 (1.67)	41.1 (1.62)	534.8 (21.06)
Average rainy days (≥ 1.0 mm)	4.9	4.4	4.8	5.9	7.8	7.2	6.8	7.2	6.4	7.3	5.9	6.2	74.8
Average relative humidity (%)	58.6	67.2	72.5	71.4	77.2	81.7	78.5	76.6	65.6	64.1	60.2	61.1	69.6
Mean monthly sunshine hours	267.4	236.8	226.6	194.5	151.4	143.5	148.6	183.9	209.9	233.2	252.0	256.8	2,504.6
Source 1: NIWA Climate Data
Source 2: CliFlo

== Dark-Sky Reserve ==
Lake Tekapo and the surrounding district were designated in 2012 as the Aoraki Mackenzie International Dark Sky Reserve. The area of the reserve is 4,367 km^{2} (1,686 sq mi) and as of 2024, this makes it the largest dark-sky reserve in the southern hemisphere. The dark-sky reserve accreditation recognises that the night skies in the area of the reserve are almost completely free of light pollution and ideal for star-gazing. Lake Tekapo and its observatories are a popular destination among astronomers, astrophotographers and tourists interested in star-gazing.

== Lupins ==
Lake Tekapo is also known for its stunning seasonal display of Lupin that bloom along its shores from around Mid November until the end of December. Russell lupins were introduced in the Mackenzie Basin in the 1940s from sowings or lupins planted in garden which had seeds that spread widely. In 1949 Connie Scott, of Godley Peaks Station, scattered lupin seeds along the roadside after purchasing about £100 worth from the local stock and station agent. Although beautiful, they modify the ecosystems of braided rivers. There were fewer lupins around Lake Tekapo in December 2020, due to the water level in the lake being too high at a vital time in their growth cycle, causing them to fail to flower.

Drivers have been warned to take care during the lupin season, as many visitors to the area slow down or pull over to admire the lupins along State Highway 8, but this may be unsafe and create the potential for accidents.

== Hydroelectricity ==
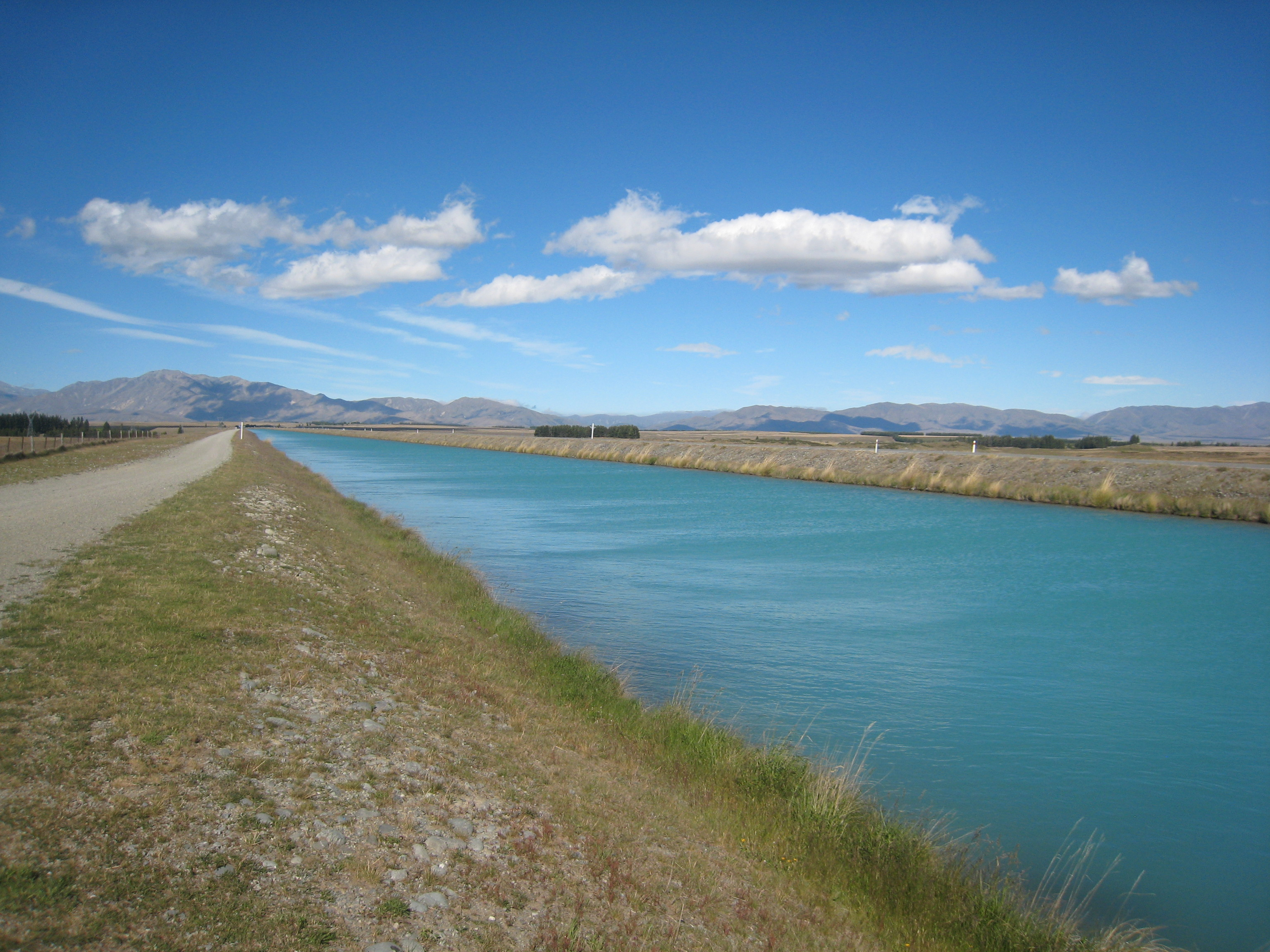
The Tekapo-Pukaki canal transports water between the Tekapo power stations

The lake's original outflow was at its southern end, into the Tekapo River. In 1938, construction commenced on a power station, originally due to be finished in 1943 but halted in 1942 by the Second World War. At the same time, control gates were constructed to regulate outflows to the Waitaki Dam downstream. Work restarted in 1944, and the power station, now known as Tekapo A, came online in 1951.

Water from the lake is diverted through a 1.4 km (4,600 ft) tunnel under the town to the power station, with the water originally being returned to the river. With development of the Upper Waitaki hydroelectric scheme in the 1970s, water is now fed into a 26 km (16 mi) canal which leads to Tekapo B Power Station on the shores of Lake Pukaki.

In 2008, Tekapo A and Tekapo B hydro stations were refurbished following the upgrade of Benmore and Waitaki.

On 1 June 2011, ownership of Tekapo A and B hydropower stations were transferred from Meridian Energy to Genesis Energy on instruction from the Government.

In February 2021, Genesis Energy finished an upgrade that strengthened the Tekapo A power station to withstand earthquakes. It involved five years of planning, two years of construction and cost $26.5 million. It was a challenging build to upgrade the infrastructure and tunnels which were built in the 1940s. The Tekapo A power station provides power to almost 100,000 homes.

== Skifield ==
On the north side of the lake, 24 km (15 mi) from the Tekapo township is the Roundhill Ski Area situated in the Two Thumb Range, which caters primarily to beginner and intermediate skiers. For advanced skiers, Roundhill Ski Area also has the world's longest and steepest rope tow which runs to the top of the Richmond Range at 2,133 m (6,998 ft) elevation.

== Buildings and other structures ==
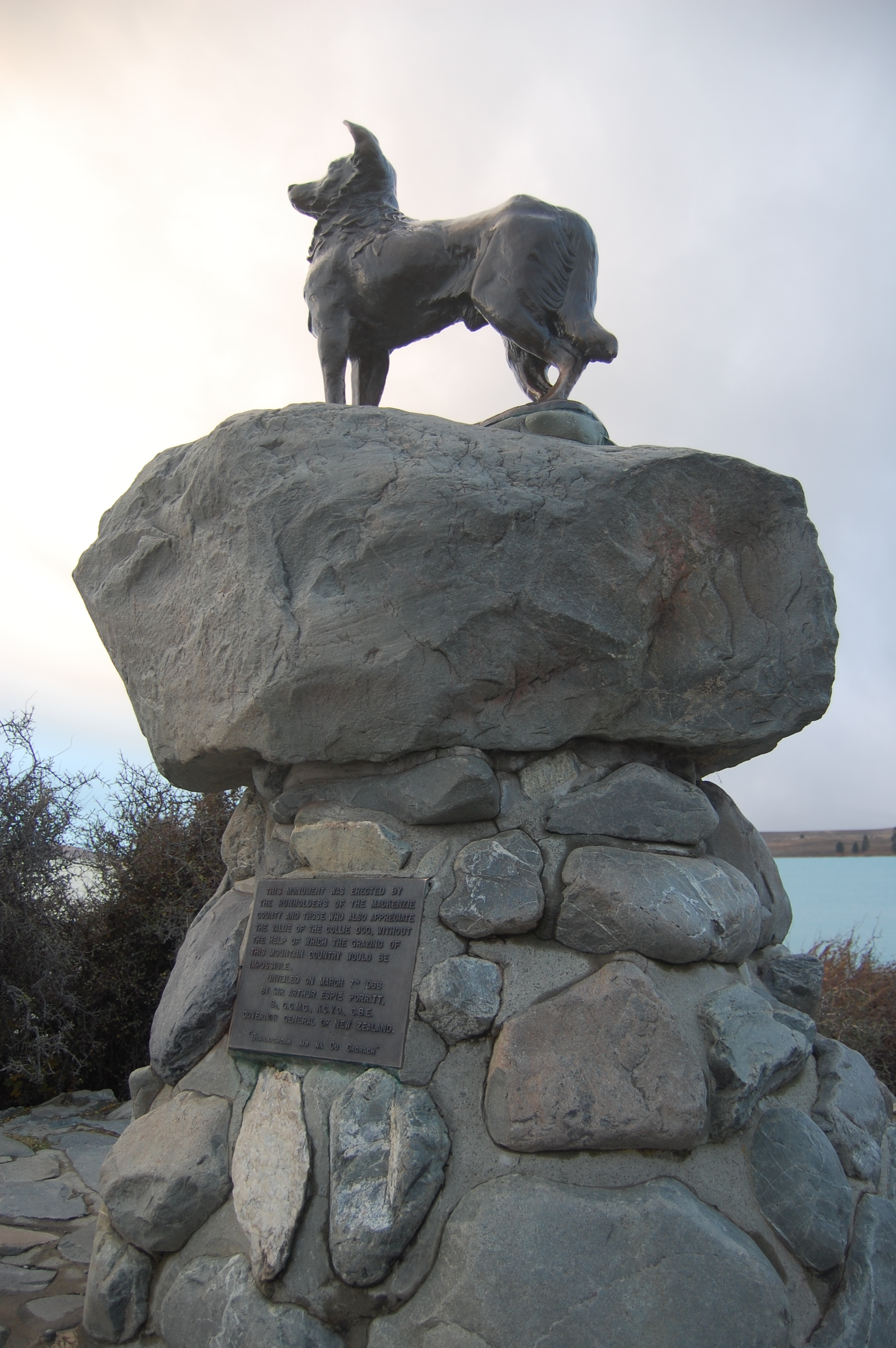
Dog statue with plaque

=== Church of the Good Shepherd ===
Situated on the shores of Lake Tekapo is the Church of the Good Shepherd, which, in 1935, was the first church built in the Mackenzie Basin. The church at Lake Tekapo was designed by Christchurch architect R.S.D. Harman, based on sketches by a local artist, Esther Hope. The church is one of the most photographed in New Zealand, and features an altar window that frames views of the lake and mountains.

=== Bronze sheepdog ===
Close to the Church of the Good Shepherd is a well-known bronze statue of a New Zealand Collie sheepdog. Mackenzie Country residents commissioned the statue in recognition of the indispensable role of the sheepdog in their livelihoods. The sculptor was Innes Elliott of Kaikōura, with a dog called Haig, belonging to a neighbour, being the model. Elliott reported the sculpting process took approximately fifteen months. Clay for the model came from the insulator works in Temuka, with a plaster cast of it made and sent to London in 1966, where the statue was cast.

== Fishing ==
Large brown trout and rainbow trout can be caught in Lake Tekapo. Trolling a lure from a boat is one option for fishing Lake Tekapo. Fishing from the shore is also possible. The best spots for fishing from the shore are to be found around the mouths of the many small streams that flow into the lake. These include the Cass River; Mistake River; Boundary Stream; Glenmore Station Tarn; Coal River and the Macauley River. In 2016 the Fish and Game Council released 45,000 baby salmon into Lake Tekapo to improve fishing stocks and a further 50,000 were released in 2020. The upper half of the Tekapo Canal will be closed to fishing over the winter of 2021 to conserve stocks while spawning. The Tekapo Canal is known for very large (trophy-size) rainbow trout.
