= Godley River =

River in New Zealand

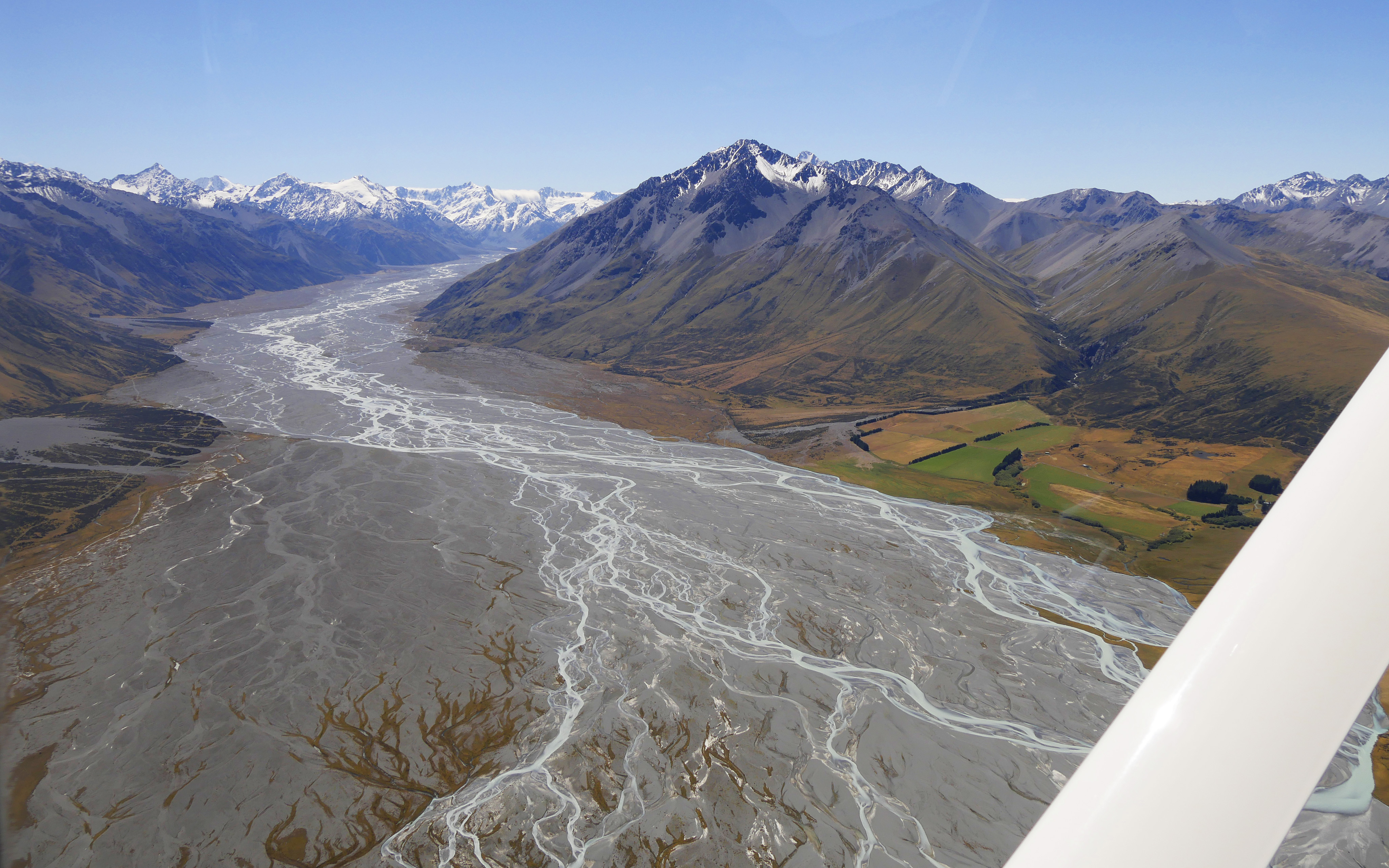
- Godley River upstream from Lilybank Station
- Route of the Godley River
- Mouth of the Godley River Godley River (South Island)

Location
- Country: New Zealand

Physical characteristics
- Source
  - location: Godley Glacier
  - coordinates: 43°28′24″S 170°30′31″E
- Mouth
  - location: Lake Tekapo
  - coordinates: 43°47′01″S 170°32′07″E
- Length: 30 km (19 mi)

Basin features
- Progression: Godley River → Lake Tekapo → Tekapo River → Lake Benmore → Lake Aviemore → Lake Waitaki → Waitaki River → Pacific Ocean
- Tributaries
  - left: FitzGerald Stream, Separation Stream, McKinnon Stream, Lucifer Stream, Godley River North Branch, Weka Stream, Station Stream, Macaulay River
  - right: Rutherford Stream, Rankin Stream, Manning Stream, Pollock Stream, Ribbonwood Creek, Pikes Peak Stream, Little Hoggett Stream

The Godley River is an alpine braided river flowing through Canterbury, in New Zealand's South Island.

The river's headwaters are in Aoraki / Mount Cook National Park at the Godley Glacier which flows from McClure Peak. The river flows south for 30 kilometres (19 mi) from the Southern Alps into the top end of the glacial Lake Tekapo, this forming part of the ultimate headwaters of the Waitaki hydroelectric scheme.
