= Mackenzie =

Mackenzie, Mckenzie, MacKenzie, or McKenzie may refer to:

== Arts and media ==
=== Characters ===
- Spuds MacKenzie, Budweiser mascot (fictional character)
- Mackenzie (Bluey), a fictional border collie character from the 2018 Australian animated television series Bluey

=== Music ===
- "Sgt. MacKenzie", a 2000 lament written by Joseph Kilna MacKenzie
- A 'Father McKenzie' features in the well-known Beatles' song "Eleanor Rigby"
- Jenson McKenzie, a German rock band

=== Other media ===
- Mackenzie (play)
- McKenzie & Co, a 1995 video game

== Natural geography ==
=== Bodies of water ===
- MacKenzie Bay, Antarctica
- Mackenzie Bay, Canada, Northwest Territories/Yukon, Canada
- Mackenzie Bay, Greenland
- Mackenzie River (disambiguation)
- McKenzie River (disambiguation)

=== Landforms ===
==== Canada ====
- Mackenzie dike swarm, in the western Canadian Shield
- Mackenzie hotspot, in northern Canada
- Mackenzie King Island, Queen Elizabeth Islands, Northwest Territories/Nunavut=
- Mackenzie Mountains, southeast Northwest Territories

==== Elsewhere ====
- Mackenzie Basin, a central South Island of New Zealand
- Mackenzie Island (Eilean Mhic Coinnich), Scotland
- Mackenzie Island (Western Australia), an island of Western Australia
- Mackenzie Peninsula, South Orkney Islands

== Organizations ==
=== Schools ===
- Mackenzie High School (disambiguation)
- McKenzie College (disambiguation)
- Universidade Presbiteriana Mackenzie, a private university in São Paulo, Brazil
- William Lyon Mackenzie Collegiate Institute, a public secondary school in Toronto, Ontario, Canada
- Bishop Mackenzie International School, a private international school in Lilongwe, Malawi

=== Sports organizations ===
- Associação Atlética Mackenzie College, a defunct Brazilian association football club
- Mackenzie Esporte Clube, a recreational, cultural and sports club from Belo Horizonte, Brazil

=== Other organizations ===
- Baker McKenzie, law firm based in the US

== People ==
- Mackenzie (given name), a given name (including a list of people with the name)
- Mackenzie (surname), a surname (including a list of people with the name)
- Clan Mackenzie, a Scottish clan
- Mack Hansen, Irish/Australian rugby player who plays international for Ireland and for Connacht at club level

== Populated places ==
=== Australia ===
- Mackenzie, Queensland, a suburb of Brisbane
- Mackenzie, Queensland (Central Highlands), a locality in the Central Highlands Region
- Lake McKenzie, a perched lake in Queensland

=== Canada ===
==== Alberta ====
- Mackenzie County, a specialized municipality in northwestern Alberta
- Mackenzie Highway, in Alberta
- McKenzie Lake, Calgary, a neighbourhood in Calgary, Alberta
- McKenzie Towne, Calgary, a neighbourhood in Calgary, Alberta

==== Elsewhere in Canada ====
- Mackenzie (federal electoral district), a former Canadian federal electoral district in Saskatchewan
- Mackenzie (provincial electoral district), a former constituency in British Columbia
- Mackenzie, British Columbia, near Williston Lake in east central British Columbia
- Mackenzie, Ontario, on Thunder Bay in west central Ontario
- District of Mackenzie, a former administrative district of Canada's Northwest Territories
- Powell River-Sunshine Coast, a Canadian provincial electoral district in British Columbia, called "Mackenzie" from 1924 to 1991

=== United States ===
- McKenzie, Alabama
- McKenzie, Maryland
- Mackenzie, Missouri, a suburb of St. Louis
- McKenzie, North Dakota, an unincorporated community in Burleigh County
- McKenzie, Tennessee
- McKenzie County, North Dakota
- Glacial Lake McKenzie, in North Dakota
- Point MacKenzie, Alaska, a census-designated place in Matanuska-Susitna Borough

=== Other countries ===
- Mackenzie District, a political district in South Island, New Zealand
- Mackenzie Library located on al-Rashid Street, Baghdad until its closure
- Mackenzie, Guyana, a township of Linden, Guyana

== Other uses ==
- USS MacKenzie, several ships
- McKenzie friend, a British legal term
- Mackenzie River husky, a dog bred for pulling freight in the Arctic
- Mackenzie Valley Pipeline Inquiry, an oil pipeline impact inquiry committee
