= Lake McGregor =

Lake in the South Island of New Zealand

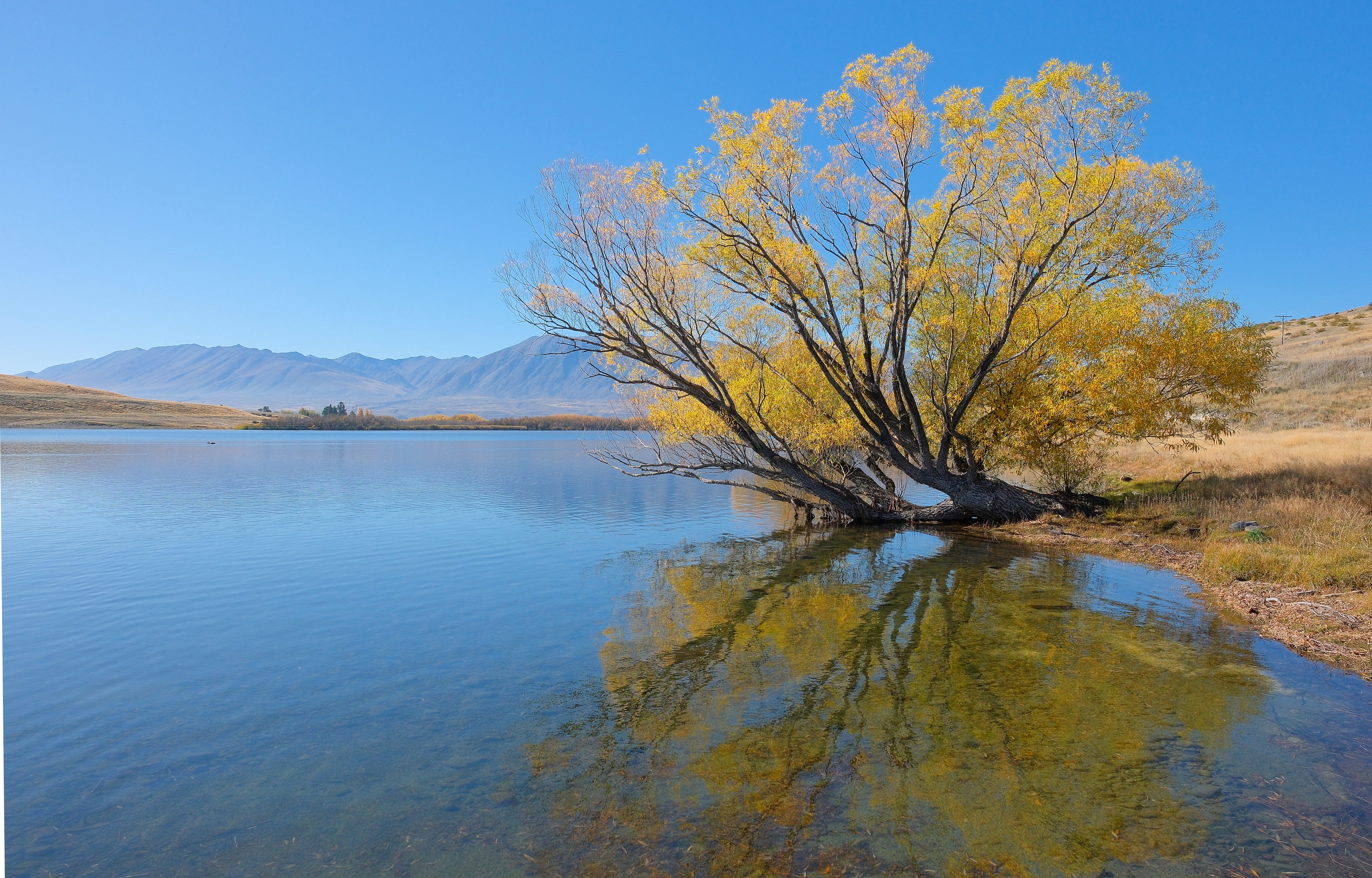
- Lake McGregor in autumn

- Location within New Zealand
- Location: Mackenzie District, Canterbury region, South Island
- Coordinates: 43°56′10″S 170°28′14″E
- Type: Mesotrophic
- Basin countries: New Zealand
- Max. length: 1.2 kilometres (0.75 mi)
- Max. width: 0.6 kilometres (0.37 mi)
- Surface area: 44.5 hectares (110 acres)
- Surface elevation: 711 m (2,333 ft)
- Islands: 1

Lake McGregor is a lake located in the Mackenzie Basin of New Zealand's South Island. It lies between the larger Lake Alexandrina to the west and the much larger Lake Tekapo to the east. It is a shallow lake with distinct indications of glacial origin and is fed by small streams and the outlet of Lake Alexandrina and drains via a short stream into Lake Tekapo. On its eastern end it contains a wetland and island of around 5.6 hectares (14 acres) in size.
