= Tennessee House of Representatives 31st district =

State legislative district in Tennessee

Tennessee's 31st State House of Representatives district
- Map of Tennessee House districts with the 31st District shaded in red
Representative
Ron Travis; R–Dayton
since 2013
- Demographics: 88.4% White; 2.1% Black; 5% Hispanic; 0.5% Asian; 3.6% Multiracial
- Population (2024): 72,538

The Tennessee House of Representatives 31st district is one of the 99 legislative districts in the lower house of the Tennessee General Assembly. The district is located in East Tennessee and covers Bledsoe, Rhea, Sequatchie, and Van Buren counties. The district includes Spencer, Dunlap, Pikeville, and Dayton. It also includes Graysville and Spring City. The rest of the district is unincorporated and mostly rural. Ron Travis has represented the district since 2013.

== Demographics ==
The Tennessee Comptroller estimates the population as of 2024 at 72,538.

- 88.4% of the district is White
- 5% of the district is Hispanic
- 2.1% of the district is Black
- 0.3% of the district is Asian
- 3.6% of the district is Two or more races

Detailed demographic information is also available through Census Reporter.

== History ==
The 88th Tennessee General Assembly was the first in which all districts were numbered. At this time, the 31st district was in Hamilton and Rhea counties. From the 89th to 103rd GAs, it was part of Hamilton County. From the 104th-107th GAs, it was composed of Northern Hamilton and all of Rhea counties. From the 108th to 112th GAs, it was composed of Bledsoe, Sequatchie, Rhea and part of Roane counties. Since the 113th General Assembly, it has been composed of Bledsoe, Rhea, Sequatchie, and Van Buren counties.

== List of Representatives ==
Representative	Party	Years of Service	General Assembly	Hometown
Andrew Swafford	Republican	2026-present	115th	
Ron Travis	Republican	2013-2026	108th-114th	Dayton
Jim Cobb	Republican	2007-2012	105th-107th	Spring City
Bo Watson	Republican	2005-2006	104th	Hixson
Jim Vincent	Republican	2001-2004	102nd-103rd	Soddy Daisy
Arnold Stulce	Democratic	1993-2000	98th-101st	Nashville
Kenneth J. Meyer	Republican	1991-1992	97th	East Ridge
Paul M. Starnes	Democratic	1975-1990	89th-96th	Chattanooga
William Carter Jr.	Republican	1973-1974	88th	Chattanooga
