= Tennessee House of Representatives 30th district =

State legislative district in Tennessee

Tennessee's 30th State House of Representatives district
- Map of Tennessee House districts with the 30th District shaded in red
Representative
| Esther Helton-Haynes; R–East Brainerd |
- Demographics: 68.8% White; 12.9% Black; 11.2% Hispanic; 3.1% Asian; 0.5% Other; 3.4% Multiracial
- Population (2024): 75,003

The Tennessee House of Representatives 30th district is one of 99 legislative districts in the Tennessee House of Representatives. The district represents southeast Hamilton County. It includes the city of East Ridge, portions of Chattanooga as well as Ridgeside. It extends east to East Brainerd and Apison. It has been represented by Esther Helton-Haynes since 2010. The district is considered slightly competitive. In 2024, Donald Trump won the district by 15.6%

== Demographics ==
The Tennessee Comptroller estimates the population as of 2024 at 75,003.

- 68.8% of the district is White
- 12.9% of the district is African American
- 11.2% of the district is Hispanic
- 3.1% of the district is Asian
- 0.5% of the district is some other race
- 3.4% of the district is Two or more races

Detailed demographic information is available through Census Reporter as well.

== History ==
The 88th Tennessee General Assembly was the first in which districts were numbered; prior, Hamilton County had a set of numbered districts. At this time, the district was made of parts of Hamilton and Meigs counties. Since the 89th GA, it has been part of Hamilton County.

== List of representatives ==
| Representative | Party | Years of service | General Assembly | Residence |
|---|---|---|---|---|
| Esther Helton-Haynes | Republican | 2019–present | 111th-114th | East Brainerd |
| Marc Gravitt | Republican | 2013–2018 | 108th-110th | East Ridge |
| Vince Dean | Republican | 2005–2012 | 104th-107th | East Ridge |
| Jack Sharp | Republican | 1995–2004 | 99th-103rd | East Ridge |
| Kenneth Meyer | Republican | 1993–1994 | 98th | Chattanooga |
| David Copeland | Republican | 1975–1992 | 89th-97th | Chattanooga |
| Claude Ramsey | Republican | 1973–1974 | 88th | Chattanooga |

== Electoral history ==
=== 2024 ===
2024 Tennessee House of Representatives election, District 83
| Party | Candidate | Votes | % |
|---|---|---|---|
| Republican | Esther Helton-Haynes (incumbent) | 19,473 | 59.72 |
| Democratic | Heather McClendon | 13,136 | 40.28 |
| Total votes | | 32,609 | 100.00 |

=== 2022 ===
2022 Tennessee House of Representatives election, District 83
| Party | Candidate | Votes | % |
|---|---|---|---|
| Republican | Esther Helton-Haynes (incumbent) | 13,616 | 100.00 |
| Total votes | | 13,616 | 100.00 |

=== 2020 ===
2020 Tennessee House of Representatives election, District 83
| Party | Candidate | Votes | % |
|---|---|---|---|
| Republican | Esther Helton-Haynes (Incumbent) | 19,146 | 61.66 |
| Democratic | Joseph Udeaja | 11,907 | 38.34 |
| Total votes | | 31,053 | 100.00 |

=== 2018 ===
2018 Tennessee House of Representatives election, District 83
| Party | Candidate | Votes | % |
|---|---|---|---|
| Republican | Esther Helton-Haynes | 14,431 | 57.13 |
| Democratic | Joda Thongnopnua | 10,252 | 40.58 |
| Independent | J Michael Holloway | 578 | 2.29 |
| Total votes | | 25,261 | 100.00 |

=== 2016 ===
2016 Tennessee House of Representatives election, District 83
| Party | Candidate | Votes | % |
|---|---|---|---|
| Republican | Marc Gravitt (incumbent) | 17,044 | 64.12 |
| Democratic | Lawrence A. Pivnick | 8,622 | 32.43 |
| Independent | Patrick Hickey | 916 | 3.45 |
| Total votes | | 26,582 | 100.00 |
