= Tennessee House of Representatives 27th district =

State legislative district in Tennessee

Tennessee's 27th State House of Representatives district
- Map of Tennessee House districts with the 27th District shaded in red
Representative
Michele Reneau; R–Signal Mountain
since 2025
- Demographics: 85.4% White; 3.9% Black; 3.7% Hispanic; 1.3% Asian; 4.8% Multiracial
- Population (2024): 75,417

The Tennessee House of Representatives 27th district is one of the 99 legislative districts in the lower house of the Tennessee General Assembly. The district is located in East Tennessee and covers western Hamilton County. Michele Reneau has represented the district since 2025.

== Geography ==
The district includes western parts of Chattanooga. It also has surrounding communities such as Red Bank, Lookout Mountain, Signal Mountain, Soddy-Daisy and Walden.

== Demographics ==
The Tennessee Comptroller estimates the population as of 2024 at 75,417.

- 85.4% of the district is White
- 3.9% of the district is Black
- 4.1% of the district is Hispanic
- 1.3% of the district is Asian
- 4.8% of the district is Two or more races

Detailed demographic information is also available through Census Reporter.

== History ==
The 88th Tennessee General Assembly was the first in which all districts were numbered. At the 88th GA, it was in Hamilton County. From the 92nd-93rd GAs, it was made up of parts of Hamilton and Marion counties. Since the 94th GA, the 27th district has been part of Hamilton County.

== List of Representatives ==
Representative	Party	Years of Service	General Assembly	Hometown
Michele Reneau	Republican	2025 - present	114th	Signal Mountain
Patsy Hazlewood	Republican	2015-2024	109th-113th	Signal Mountain
Richard Floyd	Republican	2007-2014	105th-108th	Chattanooga
Chris Clem	Republican	2001-2006	102nd-104th	Lookout Mountain
Bill H. McAfee	Republican	1977-2000	90th-101st	Chattanooga
Paul Starnes	Democratic	1973-1976	88th-89th	Chattanooga
