= Kenzie =

Kenzie is a given name and surname. Notable people with the name include:

== Mononym ==
- Kenzie (rapper) (born 1986), British rapper, DJ, actor, and personal trainer; past member of hip hop group Blazin' Squad
- Kenzie (songwriter) (born 1976), South Korean songwriter

== Given name ==
=== Male ===
- Kenzie Blackheart (born 1996), English drag queen
- Kenzie MacKinnon, Canadian candidate in the 2007 Nova Scotia Liberal Party leadership election
- Kenzie MacNeil (1952–2021), Canadian songwriter, performer, producer, director and politician
- Kenzie Morrison (born 1990), American professional boxer

=== Female ===
- Kenzie Bok (born 1989), councillor in Boston, Massachusetts
- Kenzie "Pokey" Bryant (born 2001), American voice actress
- Kenzie Girgis (born 2004), Canadian field hockey player
- Kenzie Houk, American murder victim in 2009
- Kenzie Kent (born 1996), American lacrosse- and ice hockey player
- Kenzie Paige (born 2002), American professional wrestler
- Kenzie Roark (born 1989), American softball player and coach
- Kenzie Ruston Hemric (born 1991), American stock car racing driver

== Surname ==
- Deon Kenzie (born 1996), Australian Paralympic athlete
- Martin Kenzie (1956–2012), British second unit director and cinematographer
- Phil Kenzie, British saxophone player

== Fictional characters ==
- Kenzie Bell, from Game Shakers
- Kenzie Judd, from Coronation Street

== See also ==
- Kenzie, Alberta, a locality in Big Lakes County, Alberta, Canada
- Kenzie, fictional Scottish town in Sputnik Caledonia

== See also ==
- Mackenzie (disambiguation)
- Kensey (disambiguation)
- Kinsey (disambiguation)
