= McKenzie College =

McKenzie College is the name of several educational institutions:

- Mackenzie Presbyterian University (Universidade Presbiteriana Mackenzie), a private university in São Paulo, Brazil
- McKenzie College (New Brunswick), an art and design school in Moncton, New Brunswick, Canada
- McKenzie College (Nova Scotia), a defunct vocational college in Sydney, Nova Scotia, Canada
- William Lyon Mackenzie Collegiate Institute, a public secondary school in Toronto, Ontario, Canada
- McKenzie College (Tennessee), a defunct college in Chattanooga, Tennessee
- McKenzie College (Texas), a defunct college in Clarksville, Texas
- McTyeire College, formerly McKenzie College, a defunct college in McKenzie, Tennessee
