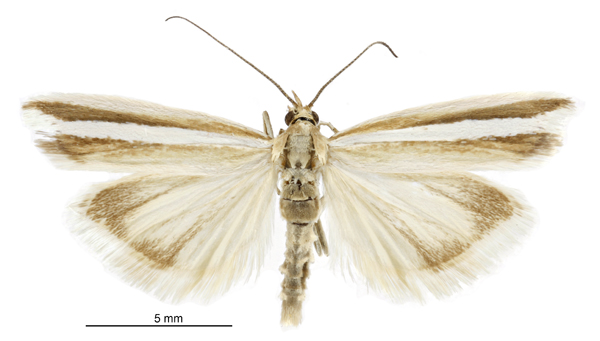
- Male

Conservation status
- Nationally Critical (NZ TCS)

Scientific classification
- Kingdom: Animalia
- Phylum: Arthropoda
- Clade: Pancrustacea
- Class: Insecta
- Order: Lepidoptera
- Family: Crambidae
- Genus: Orocrambus
- Species: O. fugitivellus

Binomial name
- Orocrambus fugitivellus (Hudson, 1950)

Synonyms
- Crambus fugitivellus Hudson, 1950

= Orocrambus fugitivellus =

Species of moth

Orocrambus fugitivellus is a moth in the family Crambidae. It is endemic to New Zealand and has only been observed in the Mackenzie Basin. This moth is day flying and males of this species have been observed on the wing in February. O. fugitivellus inhabits shrub and grasslands but its host plants have yet to be discovered. This species is classified as critically endangered by the Department of Conservation.

== Taxonomy ==
This species was first described by George Hudson in 1950 using a specimen collected by R. D. Dick in 1939 in an area adjacent to Grays River in the Mackenzie country. Hudson named the species Crambus fugitivellus. In 1975 David Edward Gaskin assigned Crambus fugitivellus to the genus Orocrambus. The type specimen of O. fugitivellus is held in the Hudson collection at Museum of New Zealand Te Papa Tongarewa.

== Description ==
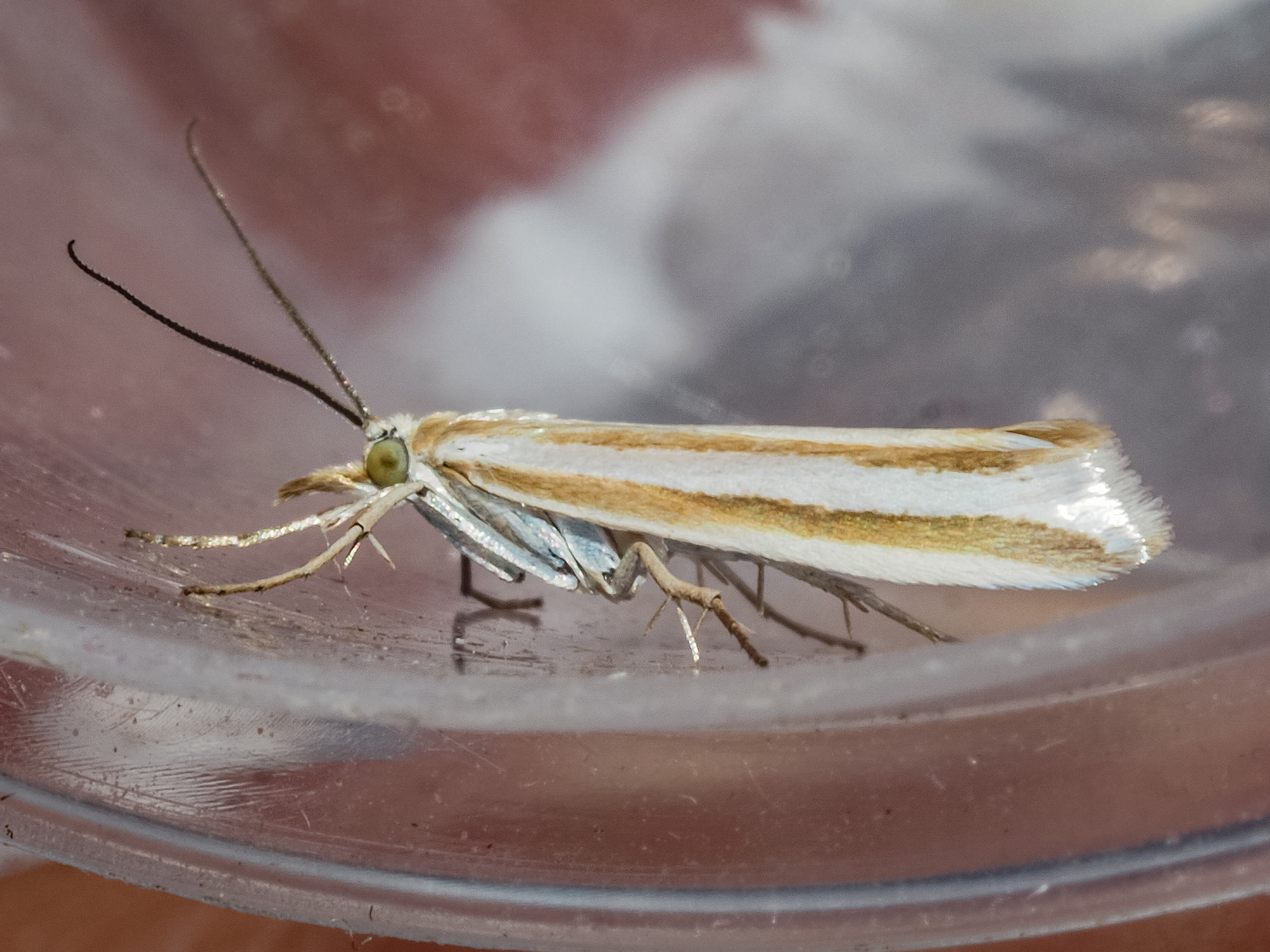
Living O. fugitivellus.

The larvae of this species have yet to be described. The wingspan of the adult male is 18–19 mm. In appearance the adult male of O. fuitivellus is similar to O. aethonellus but differs in the more abrupt tapering of its forewings and the very oblique termen. The female of the species is brachypterous.

== Distribution ==
Orocrambus fugitivellus is endemic to New Zealand. The Grays River wetlands in the Mackenzie Basin is the only area where this species has been recorded. Male adults of the species have been recorded on the wing in February. They are active during the day.

== Host plants ==
Although this species inhabits shrub/grasslands its host plants have yet to be discovered.

== Conservation status ==
This species has the "Nationally Critical" conservation status under the New Zealand Threat Classification System. It has been recommended that the type locality of O. fugitivellus, the Grays River wetlands, be protected to help conserve the species.
