= Bill H. McAfee =

American politician

Member of the Tennessee House of Representatives from the 27th district
- In office January 11, 1977 – January 9, 2001
- Preceded by: Paul M. Starnes
- Succeeded by: Chris Clem

Personal details
- Born: March 10, 1931
- Died: September 12, 2015 (aged 84)
- Party: Republican

Bill H. McAfee (March 10, 1931 – September 12, 2015) was an American politician in Tennessee. McAfee served in the Tennessee House of Representatives as a Republican for the 27th district from 1976 to 2001. A native of Gordon County, Georgia, he was a broadcaster and hospital administrator. He is an alumnus of the University of Tennessee at Chattanooga. He died in 2015.
