= Stulce =

Stulce is a surname. Notable people with the surname include:

- Arnold Stulce (1925–2020), American politician and businessman
- Mike Stulce (born 1969), former American shot putter
