= Ron Travis =

American politician (born 1954)

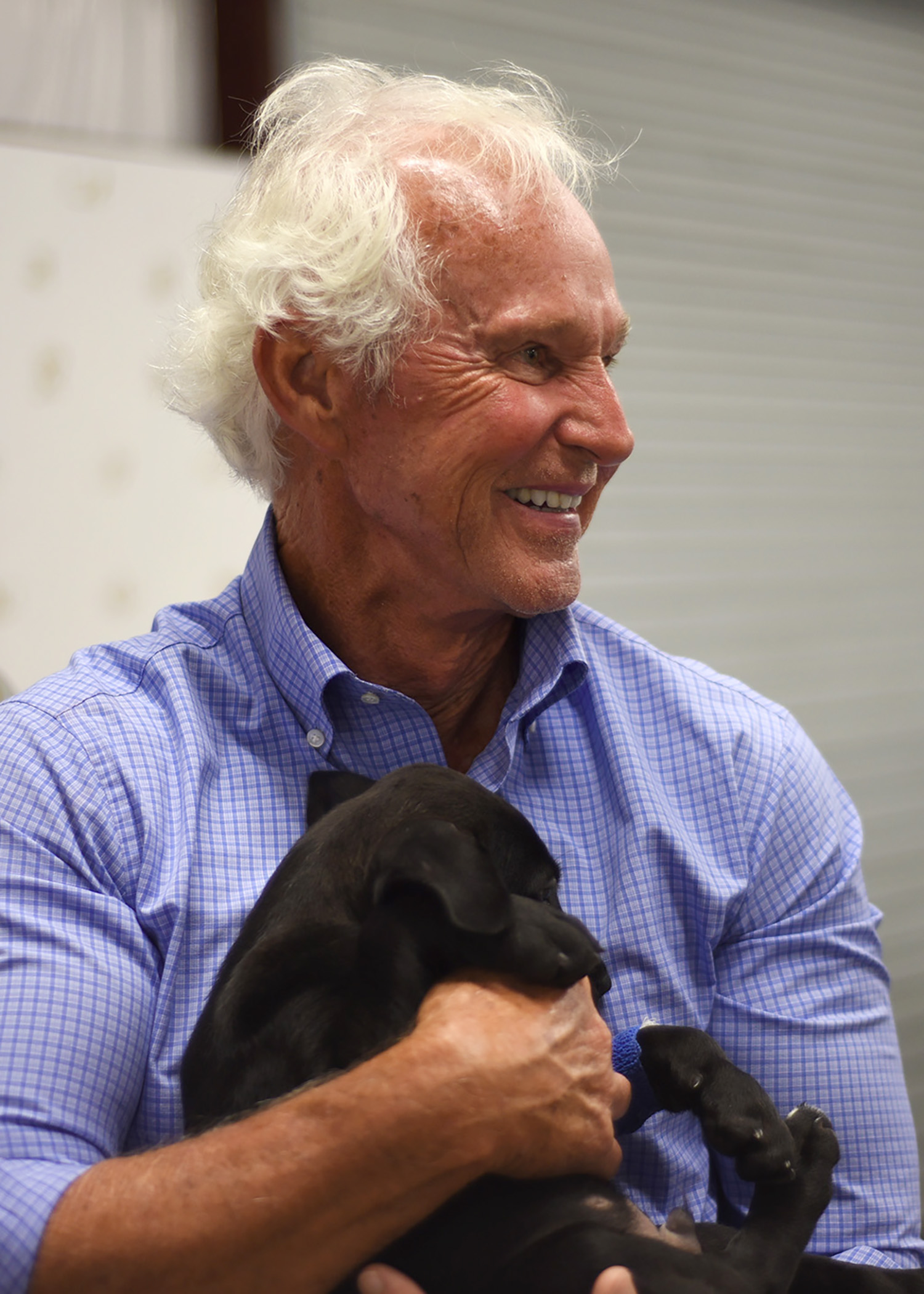
- Travis in 2025

Member of the Tennessee House of Representatives from the 31st district
- In office January 8, 2013 – August 31, 2026
- Preceded by: Jim Cobb
- Succeeded by: Andrew Swafford

Personal details
- Born: November 3, 1954 (age 72)
- Party: Republican
- Spouse: Laura
- Children: 3
- Education: Tennessee Tech University
- Website: House website

Ron Travis (born November 3, 1954) is an American politician serving as the county executive of Rhea County, Tennessee. He served as a Republican member of the Tennessee House of Representatives for the 31st district, encompassing parts of Rhea, Bledsoe, Roane, and Sequatchie counties.

== Early life and education ==
Travis was born on November 3, 1954. At the time of his election, he attended Tennessee Tech University.

== Career ==
=== Business ===
Travis formerly owned an insurance agency with Nationwide Mutual Insurance Company with five branches in East Tennessee. He was an insurance agent for 27 years.

=== Politics ===
Since 2012, he has served as State Representative for the 31st district of Tennessee, replacing Jim Cobb. He is a member of the House Agriculture and Natural Resources Committee, the House Insurance and Banking Committee, and the House Agriculture and Natural Resources Subcommittee. He is the house member of the 108th through 111th General Assemblies, member of Downtown Dayton Association, Pikeville, Dayton, Dunlap, and Roane County Chamber of Commerce, Emmaus Community, Executive Board Southeast Tennessee Rural Planning Organization, and the Board of Directors National Association of Christian Athletes.

In 2023, Travis supported a resolution to expel three Democratic lawmakers from the legislature for violating decorum rules. The expulsion was widely characterized as unprecedented.

In August 2026, Travis was elected as county executive of Rhea County.

== Political positions ==
=== Education ===
Travis opposes school vouchers.

==== Committee memberships ====
1. Chair, Business Subcommittee
2. Chair, Joint Fiscal Review Committee
3. Member, Commerce Committee
4. Member, Consumer and Human Resources Committee
5. Member, Consumer Subcommittee
6. Member, Local Committee
7. Member, Cities and Counties Subcommittee

==== 2012 Republican primary election ====
Tennessee House of Representatives, District 31 Republican Primary, 2012
| Candidate | Vote % | Votes |
|---|---|---|
| Ron Travis | 50.6% | 4,358 |
| Jim Cobb (Incumbent) | 49.4% | 4,255 |
| Total Votes | | 8,613 |

===== 2014 Republican primary election =====
Tennessee House of Representatives, District 31 Republican Primary, 2014
| Candidate | Vote % | Votes |
|---|---|---|
| Ron Travis | 65.1% | 6,726 |
| Jim Cobb | 34.9% | 3,602 |
| Total Votes | | 10,328 |

===== 2016 Republican primary election =====
Tennessee House of Representatives, District 31 Republican Primary, 2016
| Candidate | Vote % | Votes |
|---|---|---|
| Ron Travis (Incumbent) | 85.50% | 3,899 |
| June Griffin | 14.50% | 661 |
| Total Votes | | 4,560 |

===== 2018 general election =====
General Election for Tennessee House of Representatives District 31
| Party | Candidate | Vote % | Votes |
|---|---|---|---|
| Republican | Ron Travis | 78.8% | 15,700 |
| Democrat | Dean Sparks | 21.2% | 4,216 |
| Total Votes | | | 19,916 |

== Personal life ==
Travis is married to his wife Laura. Together, they have two daughters and four grandchildren. Travis also had a son who died at 17 years old.

His home city is Dayton Tennessee. He is a Methodist and attends First United Methodist Church in Dayton.

=== Community involvement ===
- House Member of the 108th though 111th General Assemblies
- Member of Downtown Dayton Association
- Pikeville, Dayton, Dunlap, and Roane County Chamber of Commerce
- Civitan
- Emmaus Community
- Executive Board Southeast Tennessee Rural Planning Organization
- Board of Directors National Association of Christian Athletes

=== Rewards and honors ===
As of 2017, he had earned the following:

- Tennessee Development District Association Legislator of the Year 2017
- Nationwide Insurance President's and Champion's conference qualifier multiple years
- Life Underwriter's Training Council Fellow (LUTCF)
- Tennessee Men's Health - Outstanding Legislative Leadership Award 2014
- Tennessee Development District Association - Legislator of the Year Award 2014
- Tennessee Chamber of Commerce Champion of Commerce Award 2014
