= Mackenzie River (New Zealand) =

Coordinates: 44.184283°S 170.518282°E

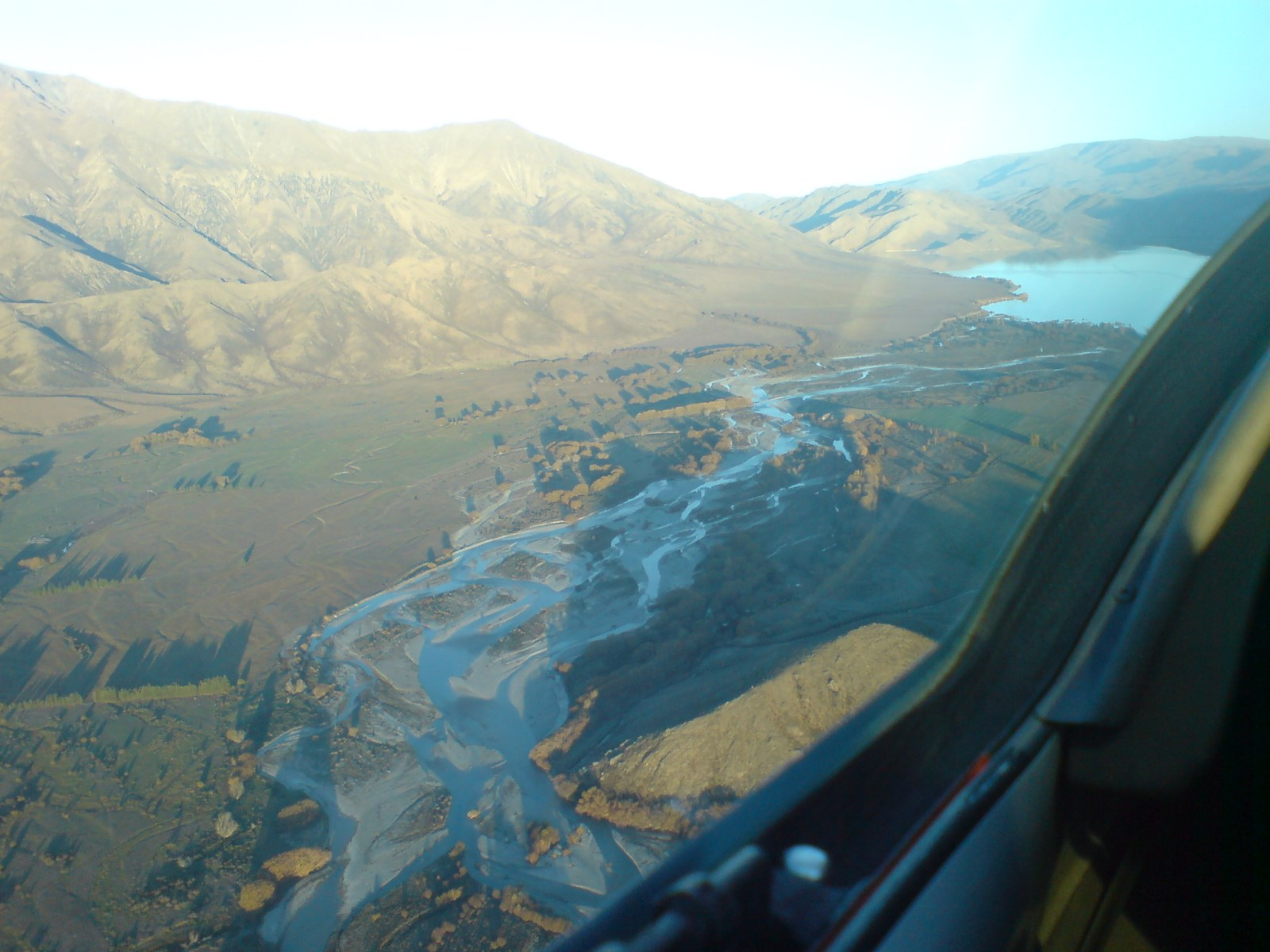

- Location of the mouth within New Zealand

Location
- Country: New Zealand

Physical characteristics
- Mouth
  - location: Grays River

The Mackenzie River is a river in the South Island of New Zealand.

It is in the Mackenzie Basin of the Canterbury region. The river feeds into the Grays River which in turn feeds into the Tekapo River.
