= Esther Helton-Haynes =

American politician (born 1961)

Member of the Tennessee House of Representatives from the 30th district
- Incumbent
- Assumed office January 8, 2019
- Preceded by: Marc Gravitt

Personal details
- Born: November 6, 1961 (age 65) East Ridge, Tennessee, U.S.
- Party: Republican
- Spouse: Marty Haynes
- Children: 3
- Education: Chattanooga State Community College
- Website: House website Campaign website

Esther Helton-Haynes (born November 6, 1961) is an American politician and a Republican member of the Tennessee House of Representatives, representing the 30th district since 2019. The district includes the communities of East Ridge, East Brainerd, Apison, and Collegedale.

In 2023, Helton-Haynes supported a resolution to expel three Democratic lawmakers from the legislature for violating decorum rules. The expulsion was widely characterized as unprecedented.

== Early life and career ==
Helton-Haynes was born in East Ridge, Tennessee in 1961. Helton-Haynes attended and received her degree from Chattanooga State Community College for Practical Nursing in 1981. Helton-Haynes had a medical background prior to politics, serving as a nurse for 35 years.

== Tennessee House of Representatives ==
Helton-Haynes currently serves as the Vice-chair for the Health Committee and is a member of the Facilities, Li-censure, and Regulation Subcommittee, Property and Planning Subcommittee, and the Local Committee. She also is a member of the Tennessee House of Representatives Health and Local Committees.

== Civic memberships ==
Helton-Haynes has participated in the following civic memberships.
Title	Organization
Council member	City of East Ridge
Member	East Ridge High School Alumni Association
Member	East Ridge Optimist Club
Member	Hamilton County Pachyderm Club
Member	Hamilton County Republican Women
House Member	111th General Assembly

Member of Elks Lodge 91 East Brainerd

== Personal life ==
Helton-Haynes is a Baptist who is active in worship at Grace Works Church.

== Electoral history ==
The following are the results for the 2018 District 30 Election.

2018 District 30 Election Results
Candidates	Party	Votes	%
Esther Helton-Haynes	Republican	14,431	51.7
Joda Thongnopnua	Democrat	10,252	40.6
J. Michael Holloway	Independent	578	2.3
Total		25,261	100
