= Chris Clem =

American politician (born 1968)

Member of the Tennessee House of Representatives from the 27th district
- In office January 9, 2001 – January 9, 2007
- Preceded by: Bill McAfee
- Succeeded by: Richard Floyd

Personal details
- Born: November 8, 1968 (age 58)
- Party: Republican
- Education: University of Tennessee (JD)
- Occupation: Politician; accountant; attorney

Chris Clem (born November 8, 1968) is an American lawyer and politician. He represented the 27th district in the Tennessee House of Representatives from 2001 to 2007. He is a member of the Republican Party.

He is from Lookout Mountain. He is married to his wife Liz and has two children.
