= Mackenzie (given name) =

- Gender: Unisex

Origin
- Language: English
- Origin: Mackenzie (surname)
- Meaning: Son of Coinneach (son of the bright one)

Other names
- Related names: Kenzie

Mackenzie is a unisex given name. It is derived from the Scottish surname, from the Gaelic MacCoinnich (son of Coinneach/Kenneth). In North America, the name is more often used for girls than boys.

Laura Mackenzie Phillips, better known as Mackenzie Phillips, had her middle name as a tribute to the musician Scott MacKenzie, a friend and bandmate of her father, John Phillips, in The Mamas and the Papas. Her starring role in the 1975 TV show One Day at a Time was a major factor in the popularity of Mackenzie as a female given name, raising it from obscurity.

Notable people with the given name in its various spellings include:

== Mackenzie ==
=== Male ===
- Mackenzie Astin (born 1973), American actor
- Mackenzie Blackburn (born 1992), Canadian-born Chinese Taipei short track speed skater
- Mackenzie Blackwood (born 1996), Canadian NHL goaltender
- Sir Mackenzie Bowell (1823–1917), English-born Canadian Prime Minister
- Mackenzie Boyd-Clowes (born 1991), Canadian ski jumper and Olympian
- Mackenzie Chapman (born 2002), English professional footballer
- Mackenzie Clark (born 2004), Canadian racing driver
- Mackenzie Crook (born 1971), English actor, director, and writer
- Mackenzie Dalzell Chalmers (1847–1927), English judge and civil servant
- Mackenzie Darragh (born 1993), Canadian competitive swimmer
- Mackenzie Gordon Jr. (1913–1992), American invertebrate paleontologist
- Mackenzie Gray (born 1957), Canadian film-, television-, and stage actor
- Mackenzie Harvey (born 2000), Australian cricketer
- Mackenzie Heaney (born 1999), English footballer
- Mackenzie Horton (born 1996), Australian retired freestyle swimmer
- Mackenzie Hughes (born 1990), Canadian professional golfer
- Mackenzie Kiritome, Tuvaluan politician
- Mackenzie MacEachern (born 1994), American AHL- and NHL player
- Mackenzie Martin (born 2003), Welsh professional rugby union player
- Mackenzie McDonald (born 1995), American professional tennis player
- Mackenzie Mgbako (born 2004), Nigerian-American college basketball player
- Mackenzie Molner (born 1988), American chess grandmaster- and instructor
- Mackenzie Murdock (born 1989), American voice actor and writer
- Mackenzie Pridham (born 1990), Canadian soccer player
- Mackenzie Ross (1890–1974), Scottish golf course architect
- Mackenzie Skapski (born 1994), Canadian goaltending coach and former NHL goaltender
- Mackenzie Sol (born 2000), English contestant on American Idol season 22 (2024)
- Mackenzie Taylor (1978–2010), English comedian, writer, and director
- Mackenzie Thomason (born 1997), Canadian politician
- Mackenzie Thorpe (born 1956), British artist
- Mackenzie Walcott (1821–1880), English clergyman, ecclesiologist, and antiquarian
- Mackenzie Ward (1903–1976), British stage- and film actor
- Mackenzie Wilcox (born 1996), New Zealand field hockey player
- Mackenzie Willis (born 1995), Australian AFL player

=== Female ===
- Mackenzie Aladjem (born 2001), American retired actress
- Mackenzie Alexander (born 2006), Canadian ice hockey player
- Mackenzie Allessie (born 2001), American field hockey player
- Mackenzie Arnold (born 1994), Australian WSL player
- Mackenzie Barry (born 2001), New Zealand footballer
- Mackenzie Bent (born 1997), Canadian ice dancer
- Mackenzie Brannan (born 1996), American artistic gymnast
- Mackenzie Brown (born 1995), American archer
- Mackenzie Caquatto (born 1992), American artistic gymnast
- Mackenzie Carpenter, American musician
- Mackenzie Carson (born 1998), Canadian-born English rugby union player
- Mackenzie Clinch Hoycard (born 1998), Australian WNBL player
- Mackenzie Cowell (1992–2010), American murder victim
- Mackenzie Davis (born 1987), Canadian actress
- Mackenzie Dern (born 1993), Brazilian- and American professional MMA and Brazilian Jiu-Jitsu practitioner
- Mackenzie Elias (born 2000), Canadian curler
- Mackenzie Fierceton (born 1997), American activist and graduate student
- Mackenzie Firgens, American actress
- Mackenzie Foy (born 2000), American actress and model
- Mackenzie Glover (born 1998), Canadian swimmer
- Mackenzie Hawkesby (born 2000), Australian professional footballer
- Mackenzie Holmes (born 2000), American college basketball player
- Mackenzie Lank (born 1994), American curler
- Mackenzie Lansing, French-American television- and film actress
- Mackenzie Lintz, American film- and television actress
- Mackenzie Little (born 1996), Australian javelin thrower
- Mackenzie Lueck (1996–2019), American murder victim
- Mackenzie McKee (born 1994), American reality television personality
- Mackenzie Padington (born 1999), Canadian swimmer
- Mackenzie Phillips (born 1959), American actress
- Mackenzie Rosman (born 1989), American actress
- Mackenzie Ruth Scott (born 1991), American singer-songwriter, stage name Torre
- Mackenzie Smith (born 2001), American actress
- Mackenzie Soldan (born 1992), American wheelchair basketball- and wheelchair tennis player
- Mackenzie Weygandt Mathis, American neuroscientist
- Mackenzie Woodring, American Paralympic cyclist
- Mackenzie Zacharias (born 1999), Canadian curler
- Mackenzie Ziegler (born 2004), American dancer, singer, actress, model, and social media personality

== MacKenzie ==
=== Male ===
- MacKenzie Bourg (born 1992), American singer-songwriter
- MacKenzie Entwistle (born 1999), Canadian NHL player
- MacKenzie Gore (born 1999), American MLB pitcher
- MacKenzie Miller (1921–2010), American Thoroughbred racehorse trainer and owner/breeder
- MacKenzie Weegar (born 1994), Canadian NHL player

=== Female ===
- MacKenzie Jones, American game show Jeopardy! contestant
- MacKenzie Mauzy (born 1988), American actress
- MacKenzie Meehan, American actress
- MacKenzie Porter (born 1990), Canadian country singer, songwriter, and actress
- MacKenzie Scott (born 1970), American novelist and philanthropist

== Mackenzy ==
- Mackenzy Bernadeau (born 1986), American NFL player

== Mackynzie ==
- Mackynzie Duggar (born 2009), American daughter of Joshua and Anna Duggar

== Makenzie ==
=== Male ===
- Makenzie Kirk (born 2004), Northern Irish professional footballer

=== Female ===
- Makenzie Dunmore (born 1997), American sprinter
- Makenzie Fischer (born 1997), American water polo player
- Makenzie Leigh (born 1990), American actress, director, producer, and writer
- Makenzie Lystrup (born c. 1977), American planetary scientist
- Makenzie Vega (born 1994), American actress
- Makenzie Weale (born 2002), Australian professional rugby league footballer

== McKenzie ==
=== Male ===
- McKenzie Corey Dickerson (born 1989), American MLB player
- McKenzie Grant (1834–1897), Australian pastoralist and politician
- McKenzie Milton (born 1997), American college football coach and former player
- McKenzie Moore (born 1992), American basketball player
- McKenzie Smith, American member of folk rock band Midlake
- McKenzie Yei (born 1997), Papua New Guinean professional rugby league footballer

=== Female ===
- McKenzie Adams (born 1992), American professional volleyball player
- McKenzie Berryhill (born 1993), American retired soccer player
- McKenzie Browne (born 1995), American speed skater
- McKenzie Cantrell (born 1987), American politician
- McKenzie Coan (born 1996), American Paralympic swimmer
- McKenzie Dowrick (born 2000), Australian AFLW player
- McKenzie Forbes (born 2000), American college basketball player
- McKenzie Hawkins (born 1997), American rugby union player
- McKenzie Kurtz (born 1997), American actress, singer, and dancer
- McKenzie Meehan (born 1994), American retired NWSL player
- McKenzie Siroky (born 2005), American swimmer
- McKenzie Wark (born 1961), Australian writer
- McKenzie Westmore (born 1977), American actress, singer, host, entrepreneur, and model
- McKenzie Wofford (born 1995), American retired artistic gymnast

== Fictional characters ==
- Mackenzie, a character in the episode "Creepy Connie 3: The Creepening" from the American TV show Jessie, played by G Hannelius
- Mackenzie Allen, in the American political drama TV series Commander in Chief, played by Geena Davis
- Mackenzie Atkins, in the British TV soap opera EastEnders, played by Isaac Lemonius
- Mackenzie Booth, in the Australian TV soap opera Home and Away, played by Emily Weir
- Mackenzie Boyd, in the British TV soap opera Emmerdale, played by Lawrence Robb
- Mackenzie Browning, in the American TV soap opera The Young and the Restless, played by Ashley Bashioum, Nicole Tarantini, Kelly Kruger, Rachel Kimsey, and Clementine Ford
- Mackenzie Calhoun, in the Star Trek: New Frontier series
- Mackenzie Choat, in the New Zealand soap opera Shortland Street, played by Ingrid Park
- Mackenzie "Mac" Cory, in the American TV soap opera Another World, played by Robert Emhardt and Douglass Watson
- Mackenzie Hargreaves, in the Australian TV soap opera Neighbours, played by Georgie Stone
- Mackenzie "Mack" Hartford, an Operation Overdrive Red Ranger, played by James Maclurcan; voiced by Nolan North in Power Rangers: Super Legends
- Mackenzie Hollister, in Dork Diaries
- Mackenzie Mack (Makoto Kenzaki), in the anime series DokiDoki! PreCure, voiced by Kanako Miyamoto (Japanese) and Stephanie Sheh (English)
- MacKenzie "Mac" Morgan McHale, in the US TV series The Newsroom, played by Emily Mortimer
- Mackenzie Zales, in the US adult stop-motion animated comedy web series The Most Popular Girls in School, voiced by Kate Frisbee
- Mackenzie, a Border Collie in the Australian animated preschool TV series Bluey
- McKenzie "Mack", one of the two leads in the television musical film Teen Beach Movie, played by Maia Mitchell
- Mackenzie, a character played by Chad Dylan Cooper from the fictional series MacKenzie Falls in the Disney Channel series Sonny With a Chance
- Kenzie Judd, in the British television soap opera Coronation Street, played by Jack Cooper

== See also ==
- Kenzie
