= Mackenzie River (disambiguation) =

Mackenzie River is the longest river in Canada

Mackenzie River may refer to:

== Australia ==
- Mackenzie River (Queensland), a tributary of the Fitzroy River in Queensland
- Mackenzie River (Victoria), in western Victoria, Australia, also called the McKenzie River, a tributary of the Wimmera River

== Canada ==
- Mackenzie River (Nova Scotia)

== New Zealand ==
- Mackenzie River (New Zealand) in the South Island of New Zealand

== See also ==
- McKenzie River (disambiguation)
- SS Mackenzie River (1908), steamship on the Mackenzie River system
