= Michele Reneau =

American politician

Member of the Tennessee House of Representatives from the 27th district
- Incumbent
- Assumed office January 14, 2025
- Preceded by: Patsy Hazlewood

Personal details
- Party: Republican
- Spouse: Chris Reneau
- Children: 5
- Education: College of Charleston (BA); University of South Carolina (MPA)
- Website: House website Campaign website

Michele Reneau is an American politician. She serves as a Republican member for the 27th district in the Tennessee House of Representatives since 2025.

== Early life and education ==
Reneau is Asian and obtained a Political Science (B.A.) degree from The College of Charleston and a Masters in Public Administration at the University of South Carolina.

== Career ==
Reneau is a small business owner. In 2024, she defeated incumbent Patsy Hazlewood in the Republican primary.

== Tenure ==
During the 2026 special session to redraw Tennessee's congressional districts, Reneau voted present on the measure to redistrict, one of three Republicans to do so.

== Personal life ==
Reneau is the wife of a US Navy veteran.
