= Kenneth J. Meyer =

American businessman and politician

Member of the Tennessee House of Representatives
- In office January 8, 1991 – January 10, 1995
- Preceded by: Paul Starnes
- Succeeded by: Jack Sharp
- Constituency: 31st district (1991–1993); 30th district (1993–1995)

Personal details
- Born: June 24, 1959 (age 67)
- Party: Republican
- Spouse: Sheena Hendon
- Children: 1
- Education: University of Tennessee at Chattanooga (BS)

Kenneth J. Meyer (born June 24, 1959) is an American politician. He served two terms in the Tennessee House of Representatives from 1991 to 1995, representing parts of Hamilton County. He is a member of the Republican Party.

== Early life and education ==
Kenneth J. Meyer was born on June 24, 1959. He graduated from the University of Tennessee at Chattanooga with a BS in economics and worked for an insurance business.

Meyer became active in politics in the mid-1980s, when he became chairman of the Hamilton County Young Republicans. He also campaigned in the 1988 Republican presidential primary, supporting Alexander Haig.

== Tennessee House of Representatives ==
In the 1990 elections, Meyer ran for the Tennessee House of Representatives in the 31st district, challenging Democratic incumbent Paul Starnes. He secured the Republican nomination and defeated Starnes in the general election with 53 percent of the vote.

In office, Meyer promoted free-market economics and criticized government expansion, winning support from many fiscal conservatives. However, he was targeted by Democratic lawmakers during the 1990 redistricting cycle, being redistricted into the 30th district alongside longtime Republican representative David Copeland. Meyer defeated Copeland for the Republican nomination. He then defeated Democrat challenger Gerald McCormick in the general election with 66 percent of the vote.

== Personal life ==
Meyer is married to Sheena Hendon Meyer. They have one son, and live in East Ridge.
