= Lake Alexandrina (New Zealand) =

Lake in the South Island of New Zealand

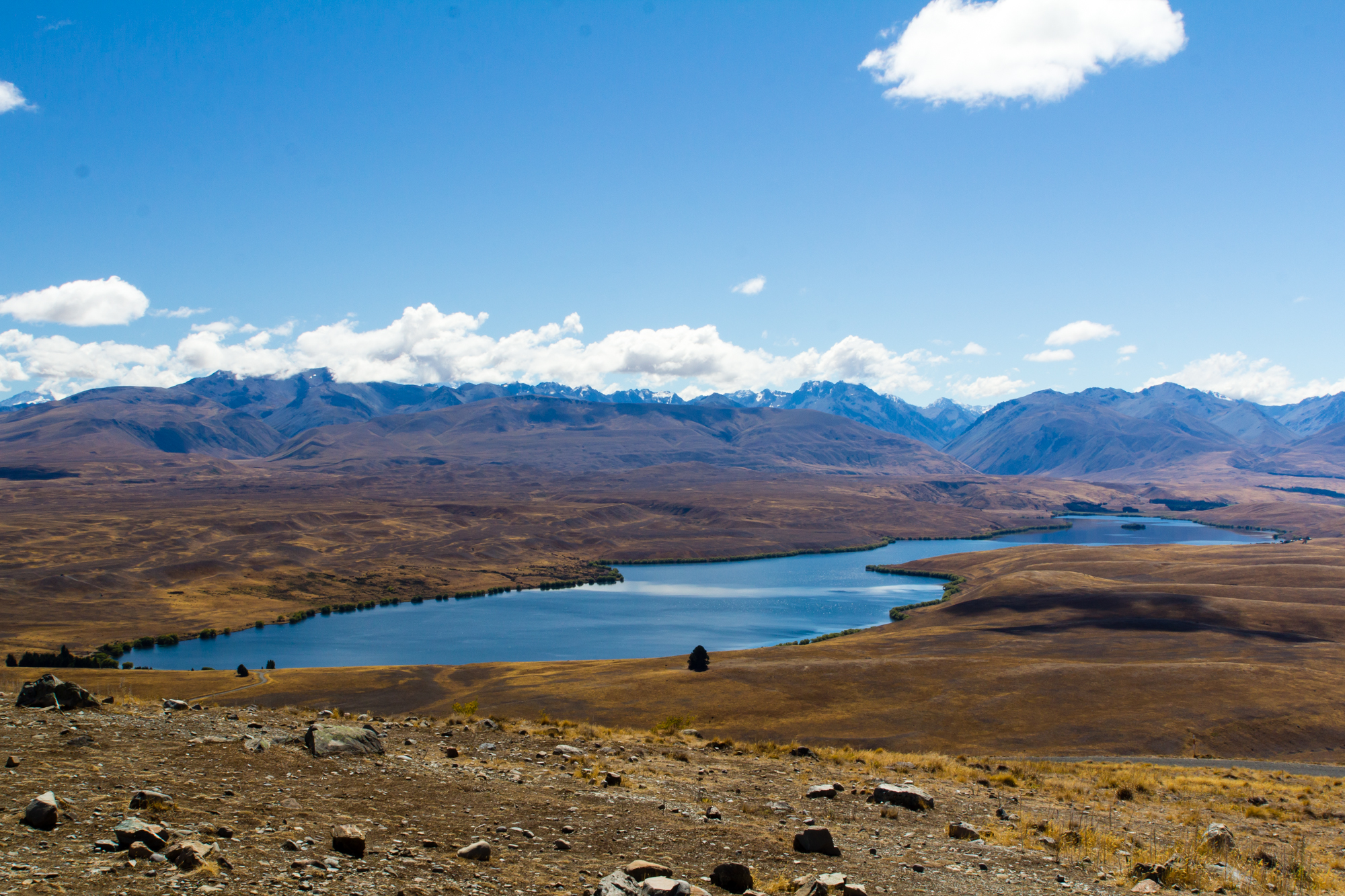
- A view of Lake Alexandrina from the top of nearby Mount John

- Location within New Zealand
- Location: Mackenzie District, Canterbury region, South Island
- Coordinates: 43°57′S 170°27′E
- Type: Mesotrophic
- Basin countries: New Zealand
- Max. length: 7.2 kilometres (4.5 mi)
- Max. width: 0.9 kilometres (0.56 mi)
- Surface area: 640 hectares (1,600 acres)
- Max. depth: 27 metres (89 ft)
- Residence time: 4 years
- Surface elevation: 712 m (2,336 ft)

Lake Alexandrina (Māori: Whakatukumoana) is a lake located in the Mackenzie Basin of New Zealand's South Island. It lies immediately to the west of the much larger Lake Tekapo and further to the east of Lake Pukaki, located to the north of Lake Tekapo township. It is a shallow lake with distinct indications of glacial origin and is spring fed with an outlet on its eastern shore midway down the lake. The outlet feeds into a smaller lake, Lake MacGregor before feeding into Lake Tekapo described as “Opaque and milky blue” in colour. In the desert terrain of the Mackenzie Plains, Lake Alexandrina is considered as an “oasis of life”. Lake Alexandrina is a Wildlife Refuge and a delight to a fisherman, well documented for its brown and rainbow trout and salmon.

== Geography ==
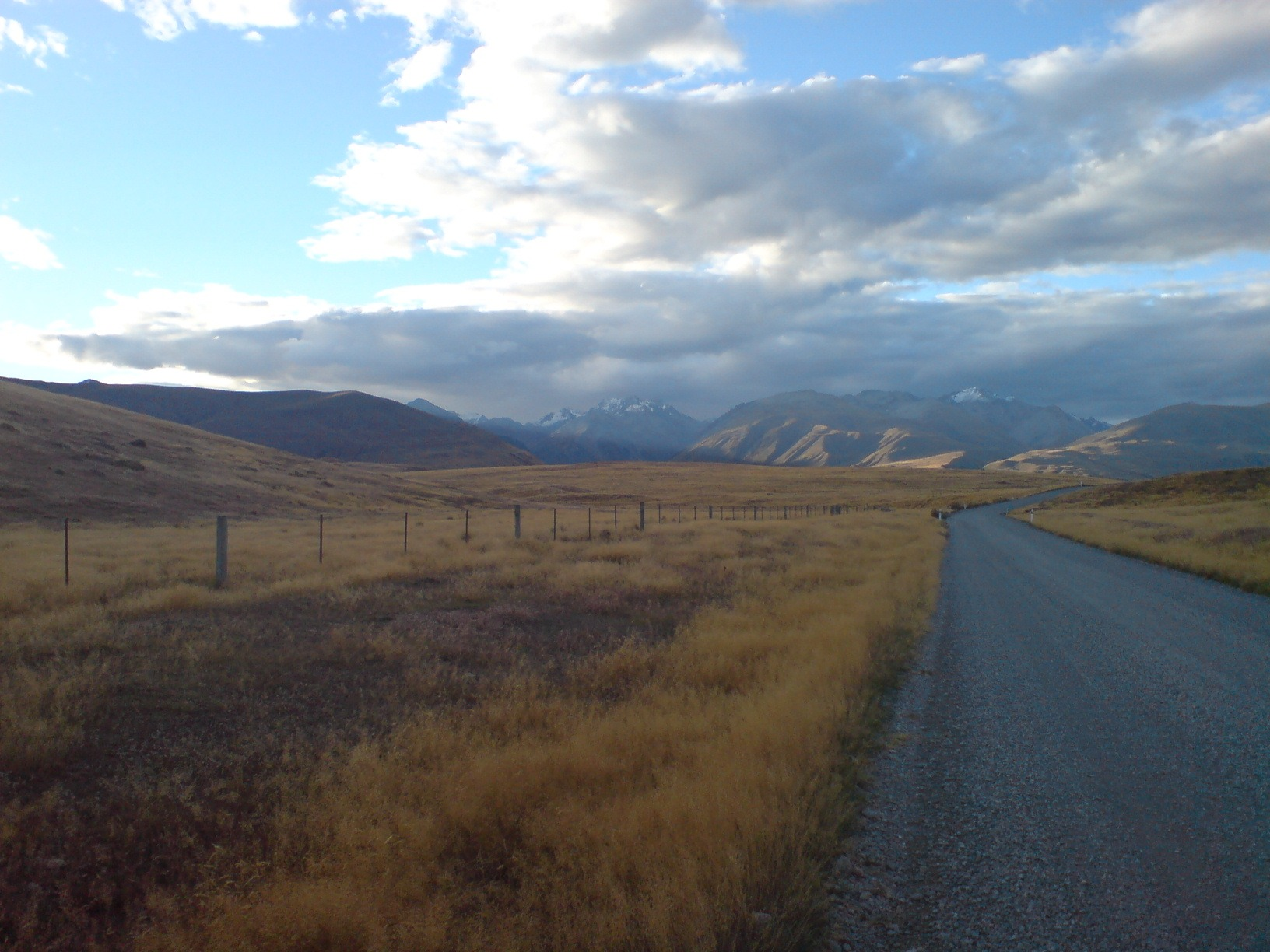
Landscape near the lake

Categorised as a Canterbury High County lake in the Mackenzie Basin, it lies a short distance from Lake Tekapo while also being connected to it. Lake Alexandrina is approached from the State Highway 8 via the Godley Peaks Road. The lake, located at an altitude of 732 metres (2,402 ft), covers an area of 640 hectares (1,600 acres) with width of 0.9 kilometres (0.56 mi) and extending to a length of 7.2 kilometres (4.5 mi). Its shores are flat. The maximum water depth in the lake is reported to be 27 metres (89 ft). The lake catchment has landscape that provides for plentiful wildlife but also has extensive cultivation which brings in a lot of nutrients, enriching the lake's with phosphorus.

The lake's annual balance is contributed by surface streams: 5.72 million m^{3} (27%), overland flows: 1.11 million m^{3} (5%), ground water sources: 10.1 million m^{3} (48%) and precipitation: 4.11 million m^{3} (20%). The storage in the lake lasts four years.

== Chemical properties ==
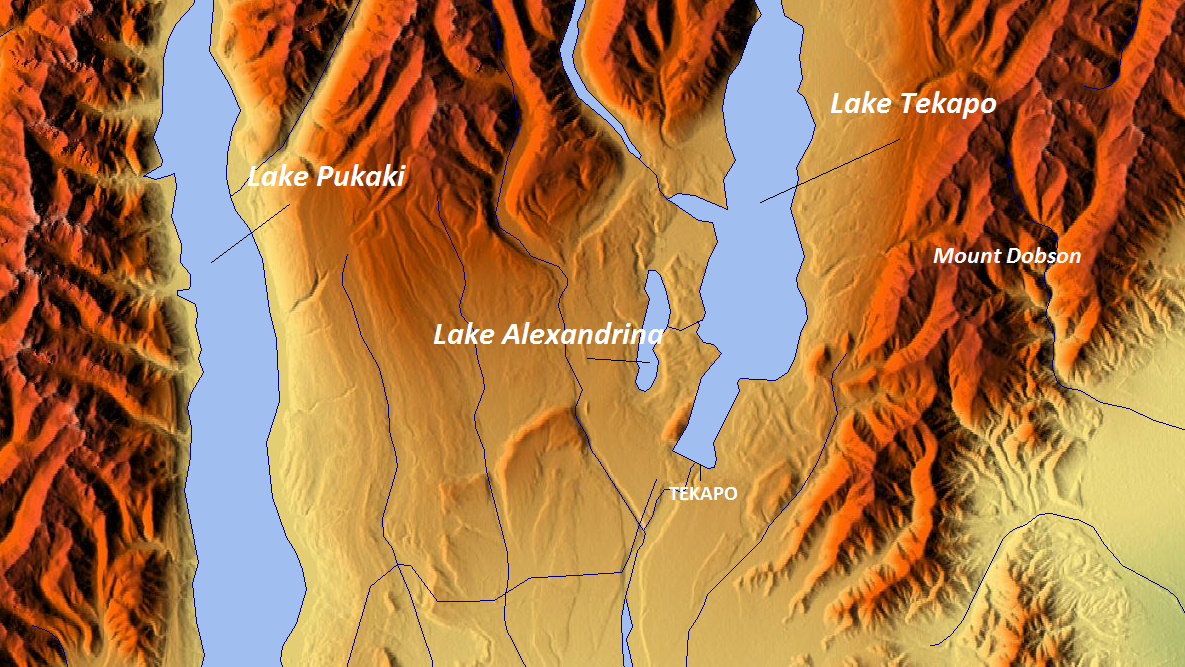
Map

The lake has been classified as mesotrophic type. Chlorophyll levels of 0.4–3.8 mg/1 have recorded during observations carried out between November 1978 and March 1979. The total phosphorus at 1 m depth was 0.009–0.015 mg/L as measured in March 1979. The reasons attributed to high nutrient content and consequent high degree of phosphorus levels are due to nutrients entering from the lake catchment, underground sources, grazing on the periphery of the lake, human habitations around the lake, aerial spray and stocking in the trout-spawning streams.

== Ecology ==
The lake catchment is biologically rich, with 45 species of birds, which include the Australasian crested grebe, shoveler and scaup. The Australian shoveller is a common bird seen in the lake area, as well as black swans and ducks. Six species of waterbirds have been recorded in total. Paradise shelducks flock here during the summer season, seeking sanctuary when they become flightless during their moult. Freshwater snails Potamopyrgus antipodarum have also been analysed in the basin area. For example, studies in 1994 found that there are more male snails in the lake's shallow water than females, and that snails are sicker in shallow water than deep water.

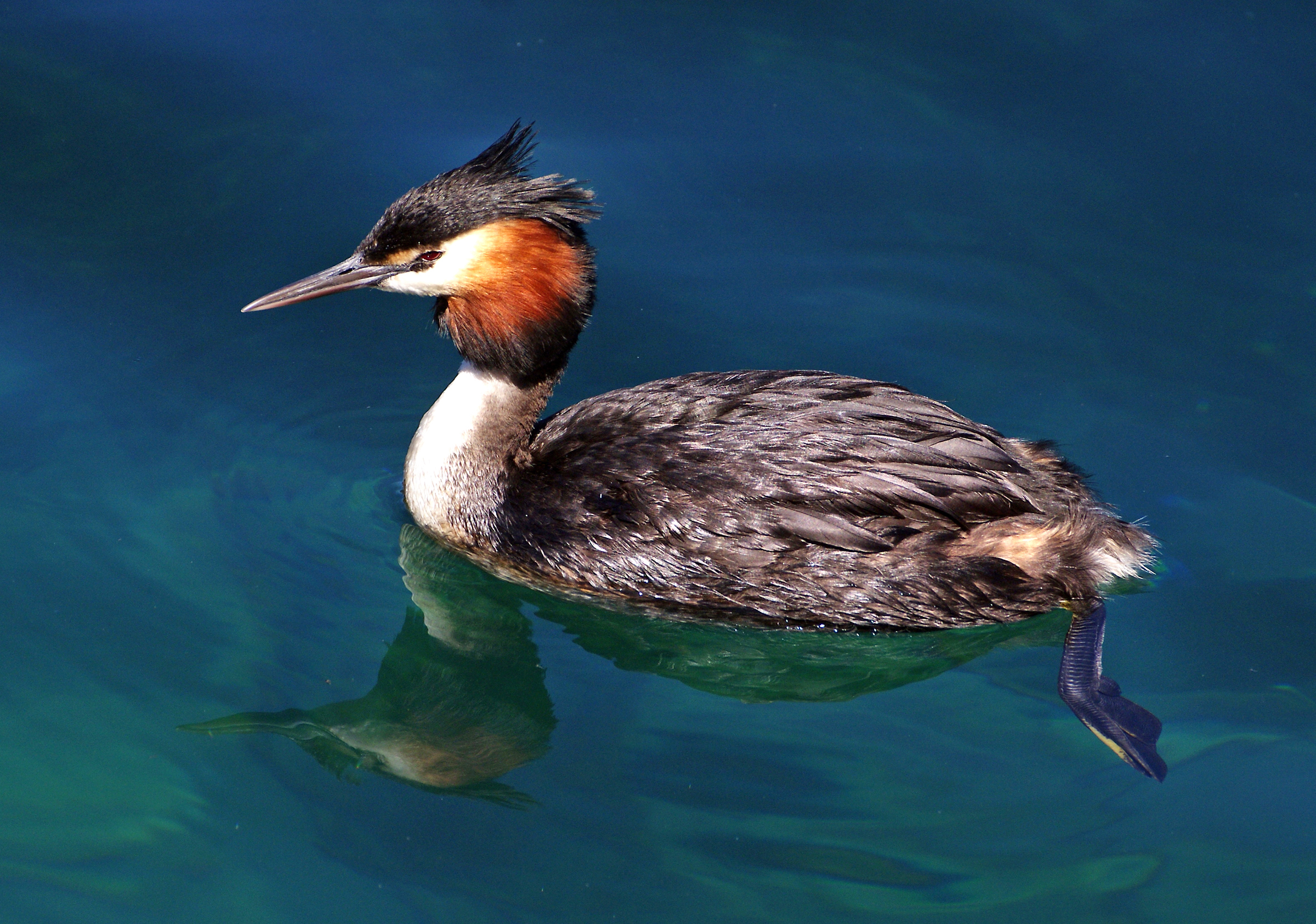
Australasian crested grebe

In December 2021, the Department of Conservation reported that over 60 breeding pairs of Australasian crested grebes had established nests in the first 50 metres of the outlet stream, and urged holidaymakers to keep their distance, to avoid disturbing the birds.

=== Vegetation ===
The breeding of the Elodea canadensis species has been inhibited at Lake Alexandrina because of the steep slopes on the east and west sides of the lake, as well as turbulence caused by high winds of 10–14 m/s.

=== Aqua fauna ===
The lake has plentiful stocks of brown trout, rainbow trout and salmon, which are well known to fishing enthusiasts. The trout are not found in abundance because of overfishing and inadequate spawning duration. However, the fish do grow to a large size, especially the trout, each weighing as much as 2.5 kilograms (5.5 lb) on an average. Some of prize catch could be of 4.5 kilograms (9.9 lb) weight for rainbows and 6.3 kilograms (14 lb) for brown variety trout (which generally are found along the shores of the lake where flies and insects abound).

== Conservation ==
Lake Alexandrina is one of New Zealand's Scenic Reserves, a valid Crown Protected Area.

Threats

The threats to the lake waters that were identified in the 1980s were the regular occurrence of algal (Anabaena) blooms, which were a result of high nutrient levels of phosphorus, survival of wildlife, and recreational fishery. It was assessed by measurements that nearly 50% of the phosphorus was contributed by groundwater, with 32% from surface water inflows and only 3–9% from hut settlements. This resulted in poor quality of the lake waters and subsequently, measures to check the phosphorus content in the lake received priority attention of the Government of New Zealand.

Conservation measures

In order to take adequate remedial measures to check the inflow of nutrients into the lake, which had raised the phosphorus content in the lake waters to unacceptable levels, in 1984, the "Lake Alexandrina Steering Committee" was set up which identified the problem areas causing deterioration of water quality as due to phosphorus as also from the hut settlements at the outlet and south end, and from agricultural sources. The Taranaki Catchment Commission and the Waitaki Catchment Commission, who examined this issue in 1987, also concluded that though the inflows exceeded outflows, but they did not contribute to the storage due to the high sediment contribution which vitiated the storage. Consequent to their study of recorded high total phosphorus levels causing the blooms and creating threats to wildlife and the recreational fisheries, the Commission prescribed interim management guidelines such as: Total cessation of aerial top dressing within 500 metres (1,600 ft) of the eastern shore and 800 metres (2,600 ft) of the western shore and around the flow sources into the lake; restrictions on fertiliser use for agriculture; access to streams for spawning activities and to establish a "deer fence" on the northern end of the wetland; stop all activities related to cultivation on the shores of the lake; stop building of the hut settlements around the lake; install individual household effluent storage or septic tanks; and diversion of sewage outside the catchment. These measures were implemented by the Mackenzie District Council under a District Plan 1997, under the title "Lake Side Protection Area around Lake Alexandrina". Progressively implemented since 1985, the redeeming feature of these actions is that the heavy algal blooms of the 1980s are now infrequent and limited to a frequency occurrence of once in three years.

== Tourism ==
In 1881, 10,000 trout were brought to Mackenzie country and released into Lake Alexandrina, as well as some other lakes, creeks and streams. After the trout grew and prospered, fishing licenses were issued. Lake Alexandrina, now known for its attraction to fishermen, has a small number of fishermen's huts clustered at each end of the lake and near the outlet. Rowing boats are the only mode of transport on the lake as sail and motor boats are prohibited.

== Panoramas ==
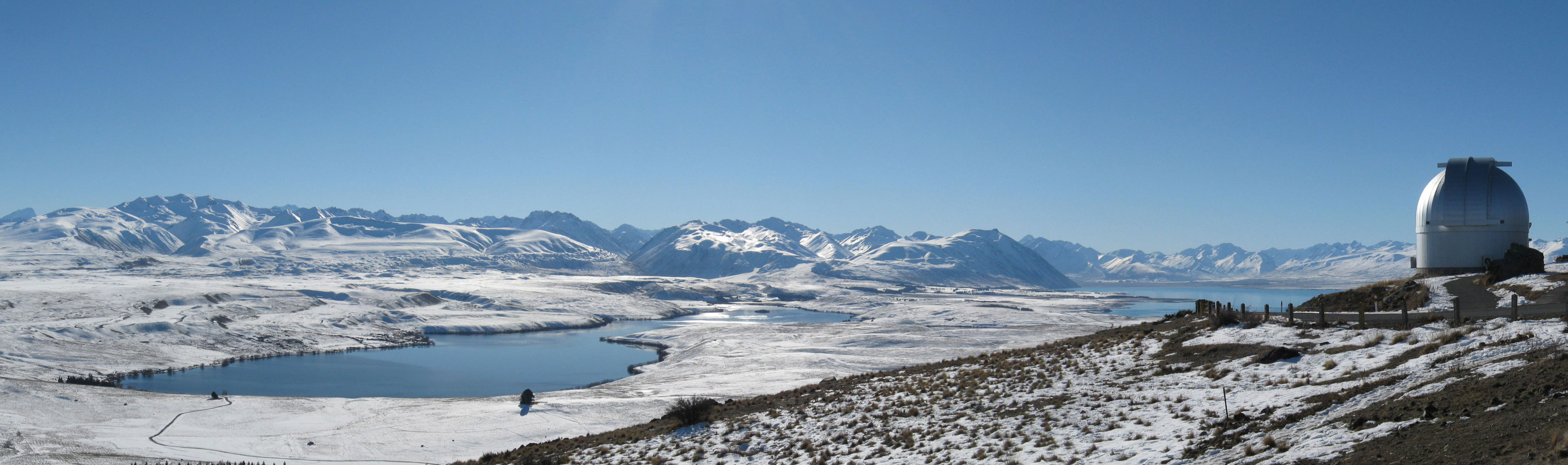
Panoramic view of Lake Alexandrina shot from Mount John
