= Kensey =

Kensey may refer to:

- River Kensey, a river in east Cornwall, England
- Kensey Johns (judge) (1759–1848), American politician and judge
- Kensey Johns, Jr. (1791–1857), American politician

== See also ==
- Kinsey (disambiguation)
