= David Y. Copeland III =

American politician (1931–2019)

Member of the Tennessee House of Representatives from the 98th district
- In office 1968–1992

Personal details
- Born: David Young Copeland III; January 10, 1931 Tampa, Florida, U.S.
- Died: June 5, 2019 (aged 88) Chattanooga, Tennessee, U.S.
- Party: Republican
- Spouse: Mary E. Leamon
- Children: 2
- Occupation: educator

David Young Copeland III (January 10, 1931 – June 5, 2019) was an American politician in the state of Tennessee.

== Biography ==
Copeland served in the Tennessee House of Representatives as a Republican from the 30th District from 1968 to 1992. A native of Tampa, Florida, he was a businessman and alumnus of McKenzie Business College. Copeland served in the United States Army during the Korean War. He also ran an unsuccessful campaign for Governor of Tennessee in the 1994 election.

On June 5, 2019, Copeland died at the age of 88.
