= McKenzie College (Nova Scotia) =

Vocational college in Sydney, Nova Scotia, Canada

- Type: Private
- Active: 1988–2018
- President: Todd Graham
- Location: Sydney, Nova Scotia, Canada
- Campus: Urban

McKenzie College was a private career college, located in Sydney, Nova Scotia. The College was founded in 1988 and offered a variety of occupational training programs. In 2018, it permanently closed.
