= Mackenzie District =

- Territorial authority district
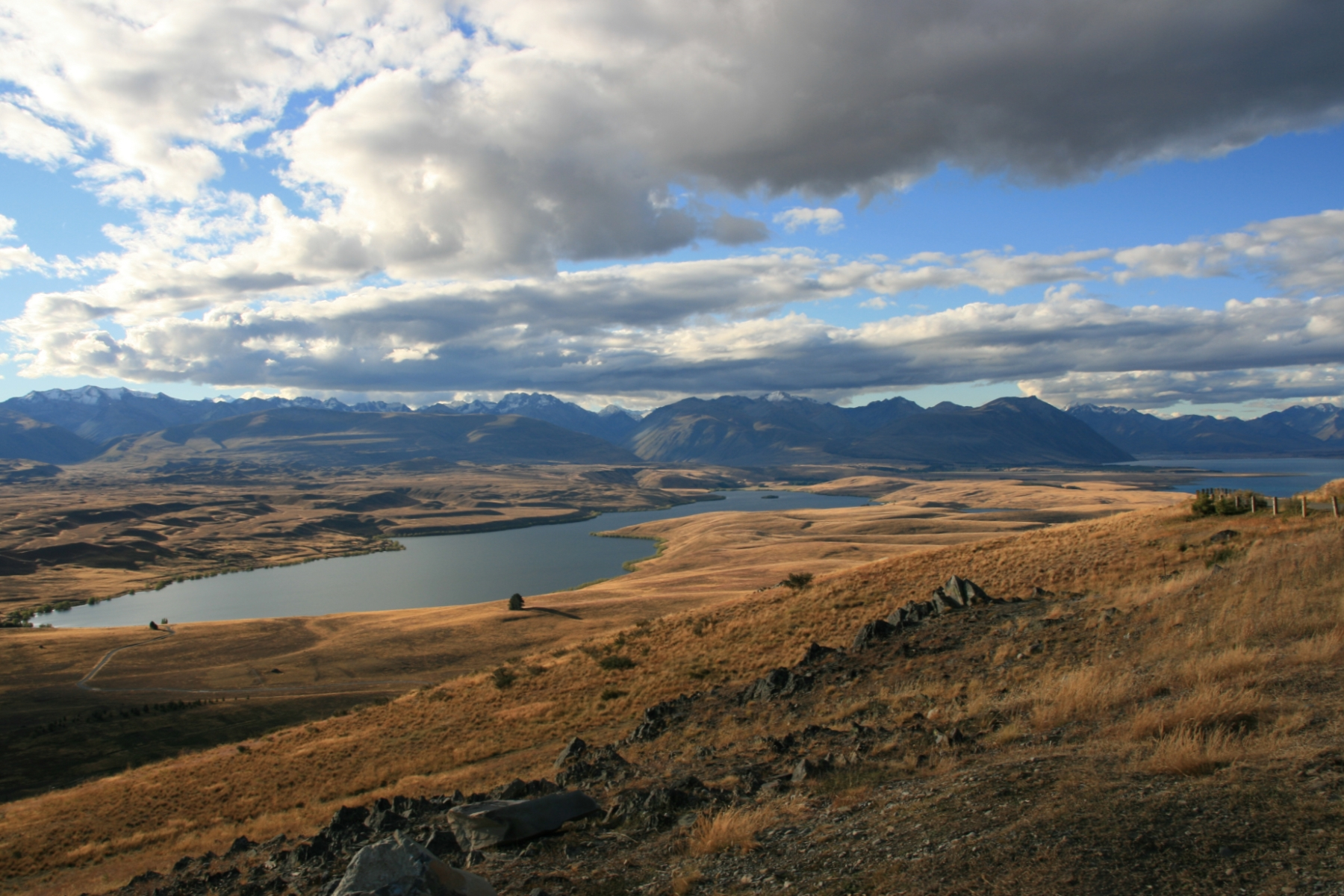

- Mackenzie district in the South Island
- Coordinates: 44°06′00″S 170°49′44″E
- Country: New Zealand
- Island: South Island
- Region: Canterbury
- Communities: Tekapo; Twizel; Fairlie
- Wards: Opuha; Pukaki
- Formed: 1989
- Seat: Fairlie

Government
  - Mayor: Scott Aronsen
  - Deputy Mayor: Karen Morgan
  - Territorial authority: Mackenzie District Council

Area
  - Total: 7,339.23 km^{2} (2,833.69 sq mi)
  - Land: 7,138.59 km^{2} (2,756.23 sq mi)

Population (June 2025)
  - Total: 5,520
  - Density: 0.773/km^{2} (2.00/sq mi)
- Postcode(s): Map of postcodes
- Website: www.mackenzie.govt.nz

Mackenzie District is a local government district on New Zealand's South Island, administered by the Mackenzie District Council. It is part of the larger Canterbury Region. The region takes its name from the Mackenzie Basin, an elliptical intermontane basin which covers much of inland Canterbury.

== Geography ==
=== Principal settlements ===
The Mackenzie District has four major settlements:

- Fairlie (pop. 970) – seat of the district
- Mount Cook Village (pop. 160)
- Twizel (pop. 1,790) – the district's largest town
- Lake Tekapo (pop. 620)

Other smaller settlements include:

- Albury
- Burkes Pass

=== Geographical features ===
Rivers:

- Mackenzie River
- Tekapo River
- Pukaki River
- Grays River
- Ōhau River

Mountains:

- Aoraki / Mount Cook

Lakes:

- Lake Tekapo and the 'Church of the Good Shepherd'.
- Lake Pukaki
- Lake Ruataniwha, one of New Zealand's main rowing venues
- Lake Ōhau

Glaciers:

- Tasman Glacier
- Hooker Glacier

Skifields:

- Fox Peak
- Mt Dobson
- Round Hill
- Tasman Glacier Heliski

National parks:

- Aoraki / Mount Cook National Park

Other features:

- Mackenzie Basin
- Aoraki Mackenzie Dark Sky Reserve

=== Climate ===
The Mackenzie District has a dry temperate-continental climate with clear, crisp snowy winters and long, hot summers. Autumn is known for being a riot of colour, while spring brings wildflowers blooming throughout the region, including lupins. The warm summer season is from November to February, with temperatures often passing 30 degrees. In the cooler winter season, from June to September, temperatures drop to below 0 degrees Celsius overnight, while sunny winter days average around 8 degrees and regular snowfall.

== History ==
The Mackenzie Basin was named in the 1850s by and after James Mckenzie, a Scottish-origin shepherd and sheep thief, and the name transferred to the modern district.

== Demographics ==
Mackenzie District covers a land area of 7,138.59 km^{2} (2,756.23 sq mi) and had an estimated population of 5,520 as of June 2025, with a population density of 0.77 people per km^{2}.

Historical population
Year	Pop.	±% p.a.
2006	3,801	—
2013	4,158	+1.29%
2018	4,866	+3.19%
2023	5,115	+1.00%

Mackenzie District had a population of 5,115 in the 2023 New Zealand census, an increase of 249 people (5.1%) since the 2018 census, and an increase of 957 people (23.0%) since the 2013 census. There were 2,706 males, 2,382 females and 27 people of other genders in 2,487 dwellings. 2.7% of people identified as LGBTIQ+. The median age was 41.1 years (compared with 38.1 years nationally). There were 834 people (16.3%) aged under 15 years, 885 (17.3%) aged 15 to 29, 2,454 (48.0%) aged 30 to 64, and 942 (18.4%) aged 65 or older.

People could identify as more than one ethnicity. The results were 84.5% European (Pākehā); 8.7% Māori; 1.5% Pasifika; 9.0% Asian; 2.1% Middle Eastern, Latin American and African New Zealanders (MELAA); and 3.2% other, which includes people giving their ethnicity as "New Zealander". English was spoken by 97.4%, Māori language by 1.5%, Samoan by 0.1% and other languages by 12.6%. No language could be spoken by 1.6% (e.g. too young to talk). New Zealand Sign Language was known by 0.1%. The percentage of people born overseas was 24.5, compared with 28.8% nationally.

Religious affiliations were 30.5% Christian, 1.4% Hindu, 0.7% Islam, 0.1% Māori religious beliefs, 1.0% Buddhist, 0.2% New Age, 0.1% Jewish, and 1.2% other religions. People who answered that they had no religion were 57.0%, and 7.8% of people did not answer the census question.

Of those at least 15 years old, 705 (16.5%) people had a bachelor's or higher degree, 2,373 (55.4%) had a post-high school certificate or diploma, and 1,020 (23.8%) people exclusively held high school qualifications. The median income was $41,400, compared with $41,500 nationally. 351 people (8.2%) earned over $100,000 compared to 12.1% nationally. The employment status of those at least 15 was that 2,532 (59.1%) people were employed full-time, 669 (15.6%) were part-time, and 48 (1.1%) were unemployed.

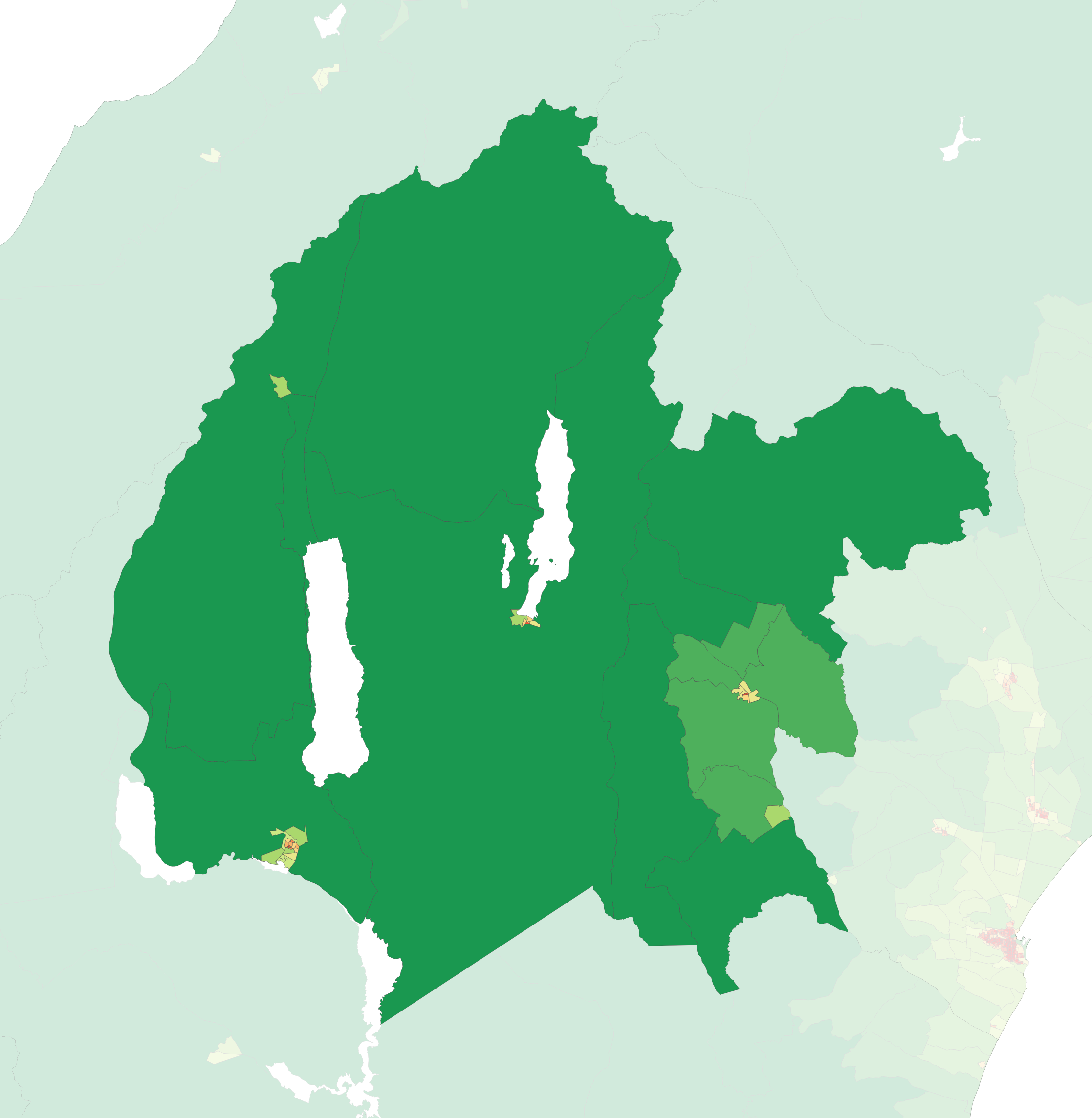
Population density in the 2023 census

Individual wards
Name	Area (km^{2})	Population	Density (per km^{2})	Dwellings	Median age	Median income
Pukaki Ward	1,521.77	2,061	1.35	1,068	42.1 years	$40,400
Opuha Ward	1,983.34	2,313	1.17	948	42.9 years	$39,800
Tekapo Ward	3,633.48	738	0.20	474	36.0 years	$46,900
New Zealand					38.1 years	$41,500

Individual statistical areas
Name	Area (km^{2})	Population	Density (per km^{2})	Dwellings	Median age	Median income
Mackenzie Lakes	5,139.71	1,131	0.22	747	35.8 years	$43,800
Twizel	15.54	1,674	107.72	792	44.2 years	$41,400
Opua	1,978.38	1,398	0.71	546	40.2 years	$44,000
Fairlie	4.95	918	185.45	402	47.5 years	$36,100
New Zealand					38.1 years	$41,500

== Economy ==
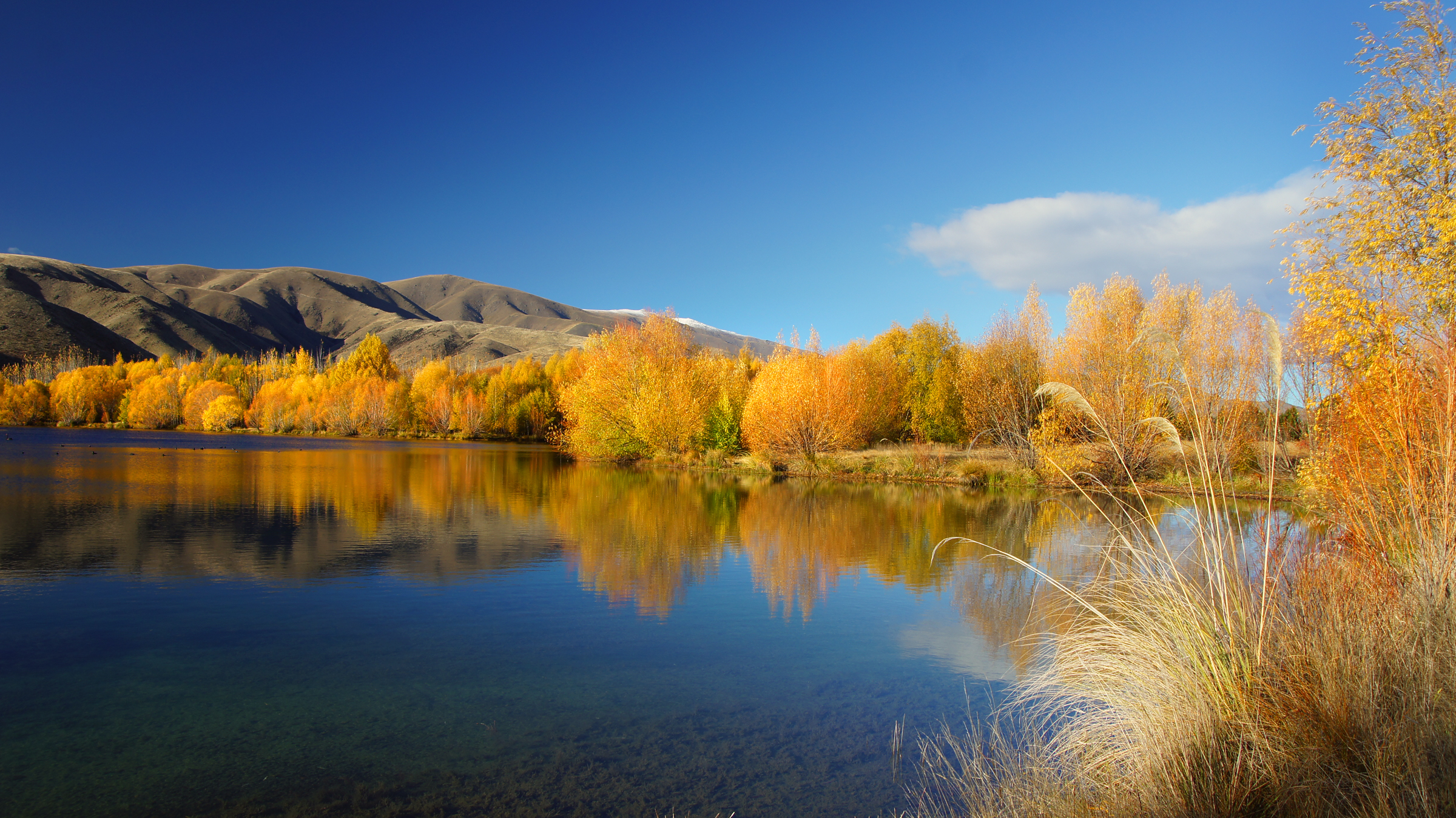
View near Twizel

In 2012, the Mackenzie District had 850 businesses who employed 1900 full time equivalent staff and generated $190 million in revenue. The economy is based on hydroelectric generation, farming (including aquaculture) and tourism.

Of the 267 farms in the Mackenzie District in 2012, 34% of these were sheep farms, 18% sheep and beef cattle, and 15% beef cattle. Minimal amounts of crop farming occurs in the Mackenzie District, with small amounts of barley (7,733 tonnes) and oats (2,265 tonnes) grown.

A relatively sparsely settled area, the district does have a wide number of farms. However, in the late 2000s, numerous proposals for new farming operations have locals fearing that the agriculture will be transformed from often family-held farms to large agribusiness operations, causing increased local ecologic damage and siphoning off capital overseas.

== List of mayors ==
Name	Term of office
Bruce Scott	1989-1992 reference to follow
Neil Anderson	1992–2001
Stan Scorringe	2001–2004
John O'Neill	2004–2010
Claire Barlow	2010–2016
Graham Smith	2016–2022
Anne Munro	2022–present

== See also ==
- List of historic places in Mackenzie District
