= Richard Floyd (Tennessee politician) =

American politician (born 1944)

Member of the Tennessee House of Representatives from the 27th district
- In office January 9, 2007 – January 13, 2015
- Preceded by: Chris Clem
- Succeeded by: Patsy Hazlewood

Personal details
- Born: April 17, 1944 (age 82) Hamilton County, Tennessee, U.S.
- Party: Republican
- Spouse: Married
- Children: 3
- Website: House website

Richard Floyd (born April 17, 1944) is an American politician who served as a former Republican member of the Tennessee House of Representatives for the 27th Assembly district, consisting of western portions of Hamilton County, from 2006 to 2014.

== Biography ==
Richard Floyd was born on April 17, 1944, in Hamilton County. He is a former employee of Chattanooga Coca-Cola.

He is a board director for Bethel Bible Village in Hixson, Tennessee, and has been involved with the Hamilton County chapter of Big Brothers Big Sisters of America and the Fellowship of Christian Athletes. He is a Baptist. He is married with three children, and he lives in Chattanooga.

== Transgender bathroom ban ==
In January 2012, he entered a bill into the Tennessee legislature (co-sponsored by fellow Republican Senator Bo Watson) which would ban transgender people from using dressing rooms and restrooms that do not match the gender on their birth certificates. In press reports, he was quoted threatening to "stomp a mudhole" in any transgender woman if they came anywhere near his family. He later stated, "This bill... is intended to protect," he said. "I have a wife, three daughters, two granddaughters, and there is no way, if some man thought he was a woman and thought he had the privileged or the right to go into a women's bathroom, I would no way and stand there and allow that," adding "Don't ask me to adjust to their perverted way of thinking and put my family at risk. We cannot continue to let these people dominate how society acts and reacts. Now if somebody thinks he's a woman and he's a man and wants to try on women's clothes, let him take them into the men's bathroom or dressing room." The bill was withdrawn from the Senate by Watson after Floyd's comments were widely publicized.
