= Vince Dean =

American politician (born 1959)

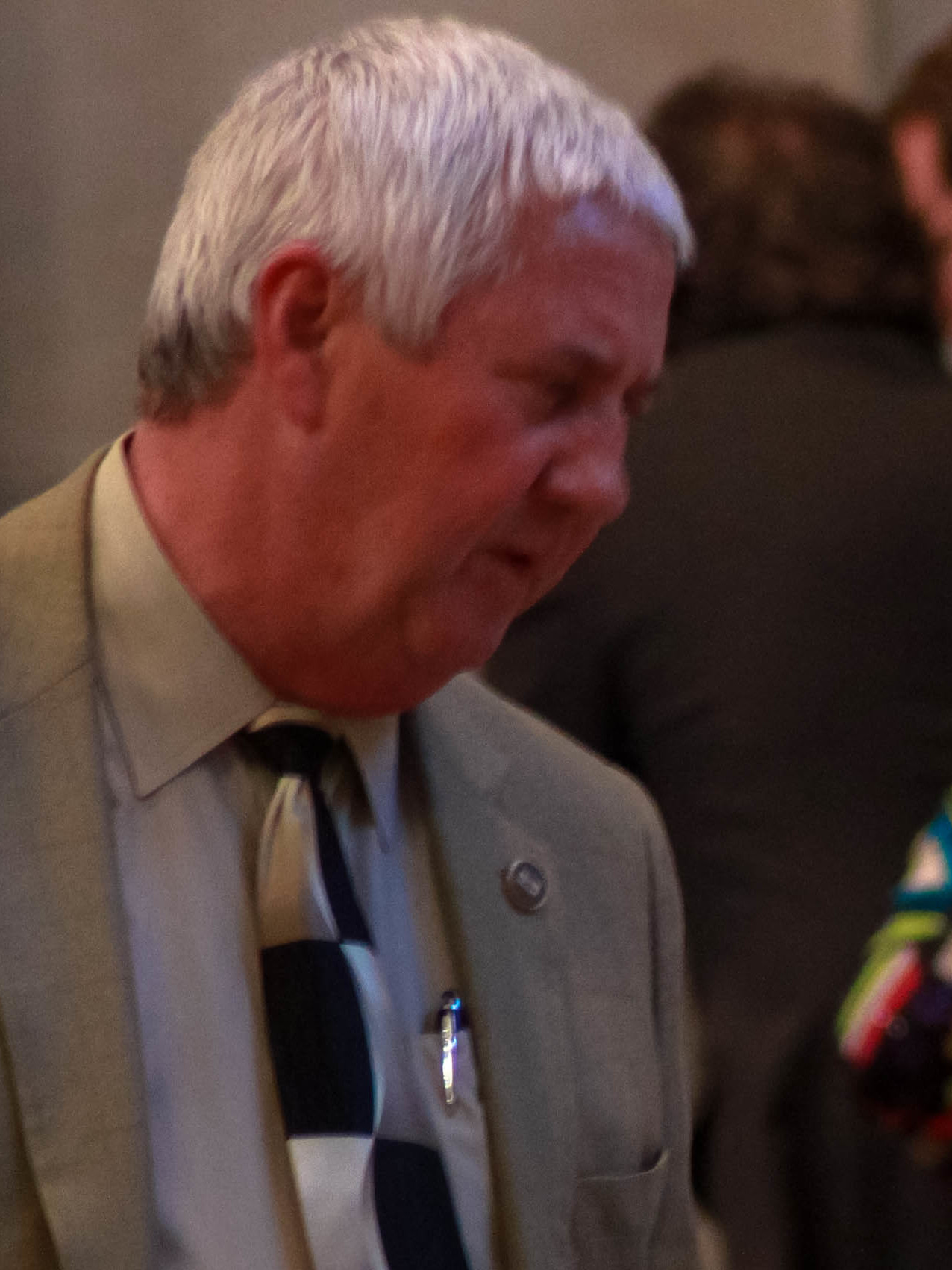
- Dean in 2014

Member of the Tennessee House of Representatives from the 30th district
- In office April 6, 2006 – August 31, 2014
- Preceded by: Jack Sharp
- Succeeded by: Marc Gravitt

Personal details
- Born: January 7, 1959 (age 67) Chattanooga, Tennessee, U.S.
- Party: Republican
- Spouse: Debbie
- Children: 2
- Education: University of Tennessee at Chattanooga; Cleveland State University

Vince Dean (born January 7, 1959) is an American politician who was a Republican member of the Tennessee House of Representatives from 2006 to 2014. He represented the 30th district, encompassing parts of Hamilton County. Dean served as State House Majority Floor Leader before resigning from his seat on August 31, 2014, after he was elected Hamilton County Criminal Court clerk.

== Early life and education ==
Vince Dean was born on January 7, 1959, in Chattanooga, Tennessee to Billy Dean, a longtime pastor and police officer, and his wife Jo. He graduated from Baylor School before attending the University of Tennessee at Chattanooga and Cleveland State University.

== Career and community involvement ==
Before running for election to the legislature, Dean had a 27-year career with the Chattanooga Police Department. He additionally served as a three-term city council member and mayor of East Ridge. He has also been a chair and member of the Tennessee Municipal League Board.

== Tennessee House of Representatives (2006–2014) ==
Dean first became a state representative for the 30th district of the Tennessee House of Representatives in 2006, succeeding Jack Sharp. Dean would win re-election later that year. Over his tenure, he held several roles, serving on the State and Local Government and the Health & Human Resources committees, along with several subcomittees. He later served as the Republican House Floor Leader and as chair of the Transportation Committee. In January 2013, Dean was chosen as chair of Hamilton County's state legislative delegation.

In November 2013, Dean announced his candidacy for Hamilton County Criminal Court clerk. On August 7, 2014, he won the election, succeeding Democratic incumbent Gwen Tidwell. He subsequently announced his resignation from the legislature, effective August 31. East Ridge councilman Marc Gravitt was appointed to succeed him.

== Personal life ==
Dean is married to his wife Debbie. The pair have two daughters and a son. He is a Baptist and has been the minister of music at Frawley Baptist Church.

Tennessee House of Representatives
Preceded by Jack Sharp	Tennessee State Representative, 30th District; 2006–2014	Succeeded by Marc Gravitt
