= Grays River (New Zealand) =

River in the Mackenzie Basin, New Zealand

Coordinates: 44.2336°S 170.3713°E

- Location of the mouth within New Zealand

Location
- Country: New Zealand

Physical characteristics
- Source
  - location: Rollesby Range
- Mouth
  - location: Tekapo River

The Grays River is a tributary of the Tekapo River in the Mackenzie Basin of New Zealand. It flows southwest for 25 kilometres (16 mi), joining the larger river southeast of Lake Pukaki.

It should not be confused with the Gray River, a small tributary of the Awatere River in Marlborough, nor with the much larger Grey River on the South Island's West Coast.

The Grays River wetland is the type locality for the critically endangered moth species Orocrambus fugitivellus.
