= Kenzie Roark =

American softball coach and player

Biographical details
- Born: June 16, 1989 (age 37); Nashville, Tennessee, U.S.

Playing career
- 2008–2011: Virginia Tech
- Position: Pitcher

Coaching career (HC unless noted)
- 2012: Virginia Tech (GA)
- 2013–2014: East Tennessee State (pitching coach)
- 2015–2018: USC Upstate (pitching coach)
- 2019–2022: Ohio

Head coaching record
- Overall: 66–62

Mackenzie Alaina Roark (born June 16, 1989) is an American softball coach and former player. She is the former head coach at Ohio.

== Career ==
She attended Mount Juliet High School in Mount Juliet, Tennessee. She later attended Virginia Tech, where she pitched for the Virginia Tech Hokies softball team. During her freshman season in 2008, Roark led the Hokies to the 2008 Women's College World Series, where they lost to Florida, 2–0.

== Coaching career ==
After graduating from Virginia Tech, Roark later went on to serve as an assistant softball coach at Virginia Tech, East Tennessee State, and USC. Roark was named head softball coach at Ohio on August 25, 2018. On July 18, 2022, Roark announced her retirement from coaching after serving as head coach at Ohio for four seasons.

== Head coaching record ==
Record table
Season	Team	Overall	Conference	Standing	Postseason
Ohio Bobcats (Mid-American Conference) (2019–2022)
2019	Ohio	34–21	12–8	3rd	
2020	Ohio	11–15			Season canceled due to COVID-19 pandemic
2021	Ohio	21–26	17–21	7th	
2022	Ohio	23–25	17–10	2nd	
Ohio:		89–87 (.506)	46–39 (.541)		
Total:		89–87 (.506)			
National champion Postseason invitational champion Conference regular season champion Conference regular season and conference tournament champion Division regular season champion Division regular season and conference tournament champion Conference tournament champion
