= Marc Gravitt =

American politician (born 1966)

Member of the Tennessee House of Representatives from the 30th district
- In office September 30, 2014 – August 23, 2018
- Preceded by: Vince Dean
- Succeeded by: Esther Helton-Haynes

Personal details
- Born: October 13, 1966 (age 59) Chattanooga, Tennessee, U.S.
- Party: Republican
- Spouse: Cleo
- Children: 2
- Education: Chattanooga State Community College

Marc Gravitt (born October 13, 1966) is an American politician and auctioneer who served as a Republican member of the Tennessee House of Representatives for the 30th district between 2014 and 2018.

He is currently the Register of Deeds for Hamilton County, Tennessee.

== Early life and education ==
Marc Gravitt was born on October 13, 1966, in Chattanooga, Tennessee. He served in the United States Army, and then attended Chattanooga State Community College. He then completed the Certified Auctioneers Institute program through Indiana University. He is the owner of Gravitt Auctions & Appraisal.

== Tennessee House of Representatives ==
In 2014, incumbent representative for the 30th district, Vince Dean, resigned early from his term in the Tennessee House of Representatives after being elected as Hamilton County Criminal Court Clerk. Gravitt, then a city councilman for East Ridge, was selected by the Hamilton County Commission to fill the seat. He was sworn into office on September 30, 2014.

In 2017, Gravitt announced his run for Hamilton County Register of Deeds. He defeated Vickie Schroyer in the election for the position and resigned his House seat on August 23, 2018.

== Personal life ==
Gravitt lives in East Ridge, Tennessee. He and his wife, Cleo, have two children.
