= Mackenzie High School =

Mackenzie High School may refer to:

- Mackenzie High School (Guyana)
- Mackenzie High School (Michigan)
- McKenzie High School, a high school in Finn Rock, Oregon
- Mackenzie High School (Deep River), a high school in Ontario
- Fort Mackenzie High School, in Sheridan, Wyoming
