= Arnold Stulce =

American politician (1925–2020)

Member of the Tennessee House of Representatives from the 31st district
- In office January 12, 1993 – January 9, 2001
- Preceded by: Kenneth J. Meyer
- Succeeded by: Jim Vincent

Personal details
- Born: April 29, 1925 Soddy-Daisy, Tennessee, U.S.
- Died: May 7, 2020 (aged 95)
- Party: Democratic
- Spouse: Doris H. Stulce
- Children: 2
- Education: North Carolina State University
- Website: House website

Arnold Alexander Stulce (April 29, 1925 – May 7, 2020) was an American politician and businessman.

Stulce was born in Soddy-Daisy, Tennessee and graduated from the Soddy-Daisy High School. He served as a pilot in the United States Army Air Corps during World War II. He graduated from North Carolina State University in 1949. He worked as a personnel manager for DuPont. Stulce served on the Hamilton County, Tennessee School Board and served as the chair. He also served on the Soddy-Daisy City Commission and was the vice-chair. Stulce served in the Tennessee House of Representatives, from 1993 to 1996, and was a Democrat.
