= McKenzie River =

McKenzie River may refer to:

- McKenzie River (Oregon), in Oregon, United States
- McKenzie River (Victoria), in south-eastern Victoria, Australia, a tributary of the Bemm River
- McKenzie River (Bécancour River tributary), in the Bécancour watershed, in Quebec, in Canada

== See also ==
- Mackenzie River (disambiguation)
