= Jim Cobb =

American politician

Member of the Tennessee House of Representatives from the 31st district
- In office January 9, 2007 – January 8, 2013
- Preceded by: Bo Watson
- Succeeded by: Ron Travis

Personal details
- Party: Republican
- Spouse: Suzanne Cobb
- Education: Memphis State University
- Website: House website

Jim Cobb is an American politician. He served as the Republican member of the Tennessee House of Representatives for the 31st district from 2006 to 2012.

== Biography ==
=== Early life ===
He graduated from Memphis State University, and did graduate work in State and Local Government. He served in United States Army during the Vietnam War era.

=== Career ===
He worked as a manager at the Watts Bar Nuclear Generating Station in Rhea County, Tennessee for thirty-one years.

He served as the state congressman for the 31st district of Tennessee from 2006 to 2012, when he lost to Ron Travis. He was Chairman of the House Government Operations Committee, and member of the House State and Local Government Committee, the House Calendar and Rules Committee, and the House General Subcommittee of State and Local Government.

In October 2012, he was arrested on charges of assault after a woman claimed he had knocked her down, but by November he was found not guilty.

=== Personal life ===
He is married to Suzanne Cobb, a retired postmaster in Dayton, Tennessee. They attend Wolf Creek Baptist Church in Spring City, Tennessee.
