= Patsy Hazlewood =

American politician (born 1949)

- Hazlewood in 2018

Member of the Tennessee House of Representatives from the 27th district
- In office January 13, 2015 – January 14, 2025
- Preceded by: Richard Floyd
- Succeeded by: Michele Reneau

Personal details
- Born: November 19, 1949 (age 77) Fayetteville, Tennessee, U.S.
- Party: Republican
- Children: 1
- Education: Middle Tennessee State University (BS)
- Website: House website

Patsy Hazlewood (born November 19, 1949) is an American politician who was a Republican member of the Tennessee House of Representatives, representing District 27 from January 8, 2014 to 2024.

In 2023, Hazlewood supported a resolution to expel three Democratic lawmakers from the legislature for violating decorum rules. The expulsion was widely characterized as unprecedented.

== Background ==
Hazlewood had an extensive background in business prior to politics, retiring from AT&T, the Tennessee Department of Economic and Community Development, and as Director of CapitalMark Bank & Trust.

== Education ==
Hazlewood received a Bachelor of Science degree in 1973 from Middle Tennessee State University in Physics and Secondary Education.

== Electoral history ==
=== 2014 election ===
Hazlewood filed to run for the Tennessee House District 27 in 2014. She prevailed over fellow Republicans Tommy Wrangle and Charlie White in the primaries, and went on to easily defeat Democrat Eric McRoy in the general election.

=== 2016 election ===
Facing no challenger in the primary, Hazlewood ran against Democrat Steve Gordon and defeated him with 72.1% of the vote.

=== 2018 election ===
The following are the results for the 2018 District 27 Election:

2018 District 27 Election Results
Candidates	Votes	%
Patsy Hazelwood (R)	18,360	65
Brent Morris (D)	9,887	35
Total	28,247	100

=== 2020 election ===
Hazlewood faced no challengers and won her seat unopposed.

=== 2022 election ===
Hazlewood faced Independent Michael Potter and won with 70% of the vote.

=== 2024 election ===
In 2024, Hazlewood was challenged by political newcomer Michele Reneau. Reneau had previously attempted a bid for District 27's House seat in 2022. Reneau ran a grassroots campaign, questioning Hazlewood's voting record and if she was a "true conservative since Hazlewood voted with the Democrates on most social issues. Hazlewood refused to answer questions on her voting record. Hazlewood was endorsed by other Tennessee and Hamilton County politicians, such as District Attorney Coty Wamp, State Senator Bo Watson, Governor Bill Lee, Speaker of the Tennessee House Cameron Sexton, and U.S. Senator Marsha Blackburn. Reneau was endorsed by the Tennessee Right to Life and the Tennessee Gun Owners' Association, as well as the Tennessee Conservative News.

Hazlewood lost the Republican primary to Reneau, despite having heavily outspent her in campaign funds. Had she won the primary, she would have faced off against Democratic nominee and former school board member Kathy Lennon in the general election, which Reneau went on to win. Hazlewood conceded after the race, and Hamilton County Republican Officials such as State Senator Bo Watson and District Attorney Coty Wamp along with US Congressman Chuck Fleshman and US Senator Marsha Blackburn went on to support Reneau for election.

== Political Positions ==
=== Abortion ===
Hazlewood advertised herself as "pro-life" to her constituents. However, she voted "not present" on the 2019 Human Life Protection Act, and voted "present" on the Abortion Pill Reversal Bill in 2021 Hazlewood refused to vote on HB2263, which banned abortions when a fetal heartbeat is detected.

=== Immigration ===
In 2019, Hazlewood voted against HB2315, a bill made to prohibit state and local governments from adoption sanctuary policies. Hazlewood also voted against HB1239, which would ban government entities from contracting with a person who does not provide evidence of work authorization status. In 2022, Hazlewood voted for HB2309 to give illegal immigrants professional licenses.

=== Gun Rights ===
Hazelwood claims to support the rights of lawful gun owners on her website. However, in 2022 she voted against lowering the conceal-carry age to 18 in Tennessee. In 2024, Hazlewood voted against bill HB2882 that would require age-appropriate firearm safety courses for TN Public school students.

== Current legislative committees ==
Hazlewood served as the Chair of the Financial Ways and Means Committee and is a member of the Banking and Investments Subcommittee, the Commerce committee and the Joint Committee on Pensions and Insurance.

== Current caucus/non-legislative committees ==
Hazlewood was a member of the Tennessee State House of Representatives Business and Utilities Subcommittee, House Ethics Committee and House Finance Committee.

== Civic memberships ==
Hazlewood has participated in the following civic memberships:

Title	Organization
Member and Past President	Chattanooga Rotary Club
Immediate Past President	Community Foundation of Greater Chattanooga
Member	Bible in the Schools Board
Member	Friends of the Festival Board
Member	Stadium Corporation Board
Past Board Chair	Chattanooga Chamber of Commerce

== Honors and awards ==
Hazlewood has received the TN Woman of Distinction Award for 2012, the Chattanooga Area Manager of the Year for 1999, the Chattanooga Philanthropist of the Year and the Junior League Community Service Award.

== Religion ==
Hazlewood is a Presbyterian and has served as an elder and trustee of Signal Mountain Presbyterian Church.
