= McKenzie College (Tennessee) =

Coordinates: 35.0473°N 85.3072°W

McKenzie College was a college in Chattanooga, Tennessee. Founded in the 1885 as Agey, Leavitt and Leavitt Business School. The school was sold to J.A. and E.L. Wiley in 1890 and was renamed Wiley's Mountain City Business College. Roy E. and H. Frank McKenzie purchased the institution in 1923 and it was renamed McKenzie College in 1930.

The institution closed in 1992.
