= Paul M. Starnes =

American politician

Member of the Tennessee House of Representatives
- In office January 9, 1973 – January 8, 1991
- Preceded by: Granville Hinton (redistricted)
- Succeeded by: Kenneth J. Meyer
- Constituency: 27th district (1973-1975); 31st district (1975-1991)

Personal details
- Born: December 31, 1934 Chattanooga, Tennessee, U.S.
- Died: January 9, 2015 (aged 80) Chattanooga, Tennessee, U.S.
- Party: Democratic
- Website: House website

Paul Malvine Starnes (December 31, 1934 – January 9, 2015) was an American politician in the state of Tennessee. He attended Chattanooga Central High School, Hiwassee College, Tennessee Wesleyan College, and the University of Chattanooga. Starnes served in the Tennessee House of Representatives as a Democrat from the 31st District from 1972 to 1990. He was preceded in office by Republican Granville Hinton, and succeeded by Kenneth J. Meyer. A native of Chattanooga, Tennessee, he previously worked in the Hamilton County Department of Education. He died on January 9, 2015, aged 80.
