= Mackenzie Basin =

Area of land in the South Island of New Zealand

Coordinates: 44°03′36″S 170°27′00″E

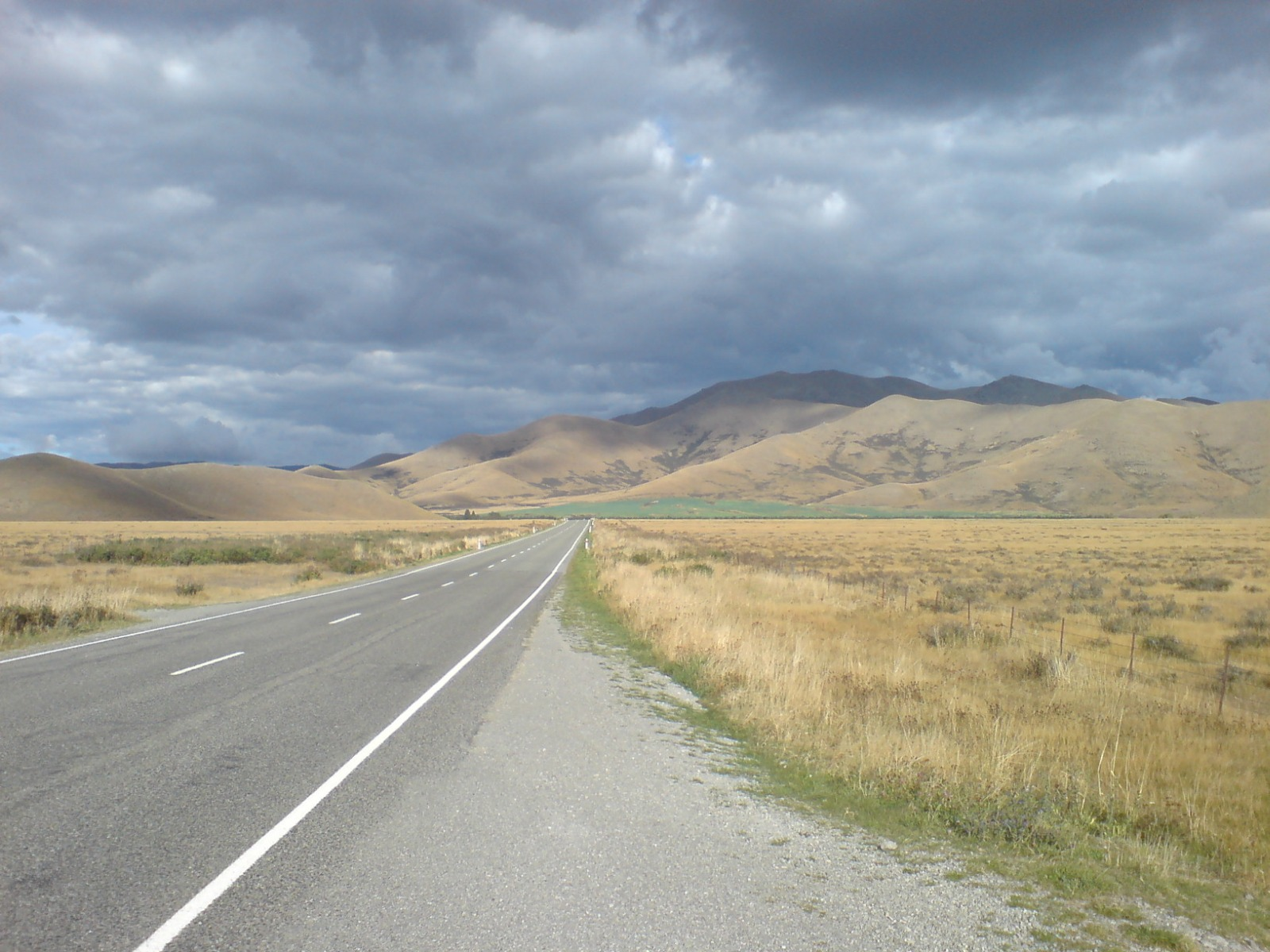
The Mackenzie Country's typical autumn colouration

The Mackenzie Basin (Māori: Te Manahuna), popularly and traditionally known as the Mackenzie Country, is an elliptical intermontane basin located in the Mackenzie and Waitaki Districts, near the centre of the South Island of New Zealand. It is the largest such basin in New Zealand. Historically famous mainly for sheep farming, the sparsely populated area is now also a popular tourism destination.

The basin was named in the 1850s by and after James Mckenzie, a shepherd and would-be farmer of Scottish origin. Mckenzie was captured for allegedly stealing sheep; he herded his flocks in what was then an area almost totally empty of any human habitation, though Māori previously lived there intermittently. After his capture, the area was soon divided up amongst new sheep pasture stations in 1857.

== Geography ==
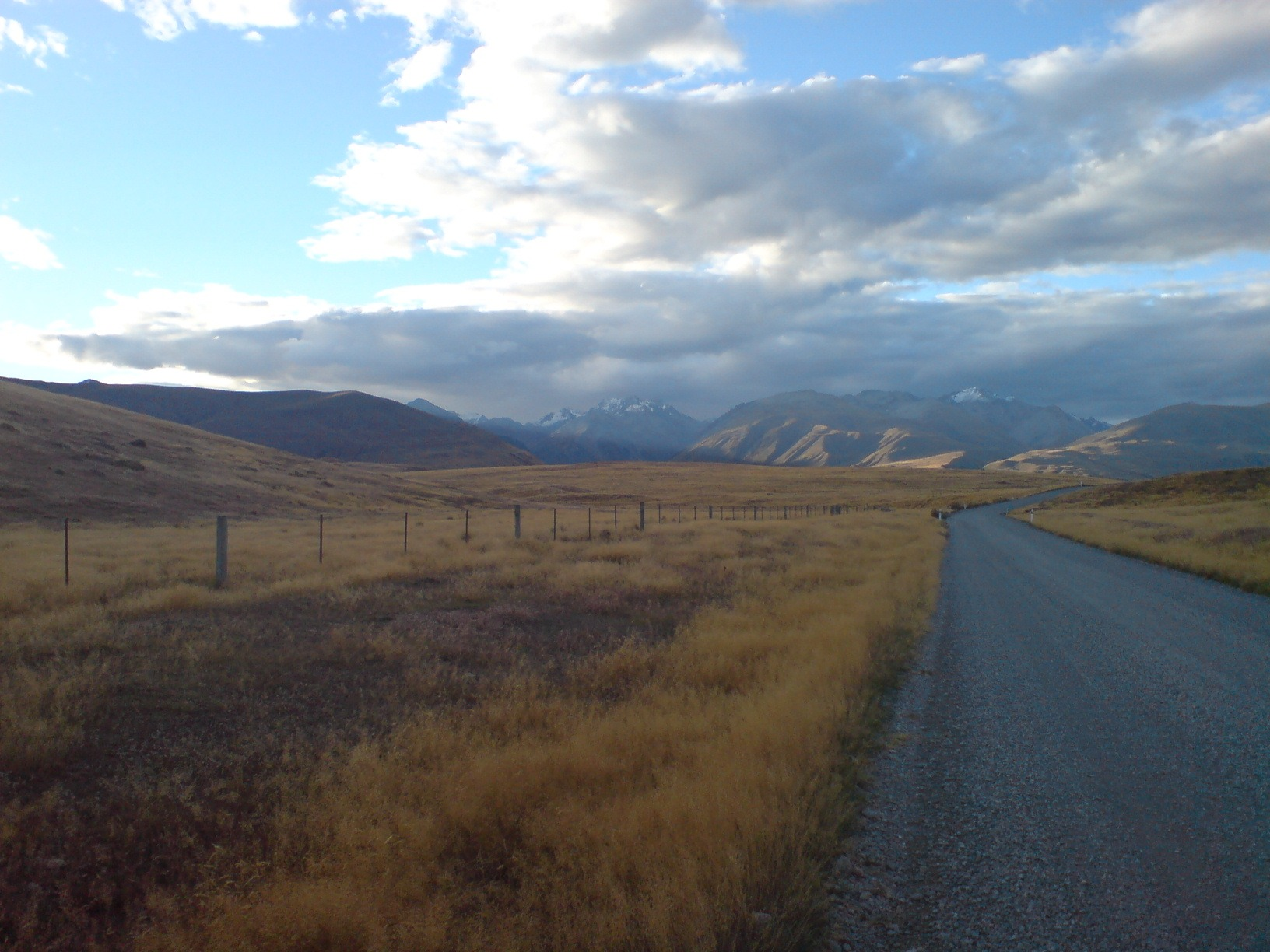
The Southern Alps form the northern and western boundaries of the basin.

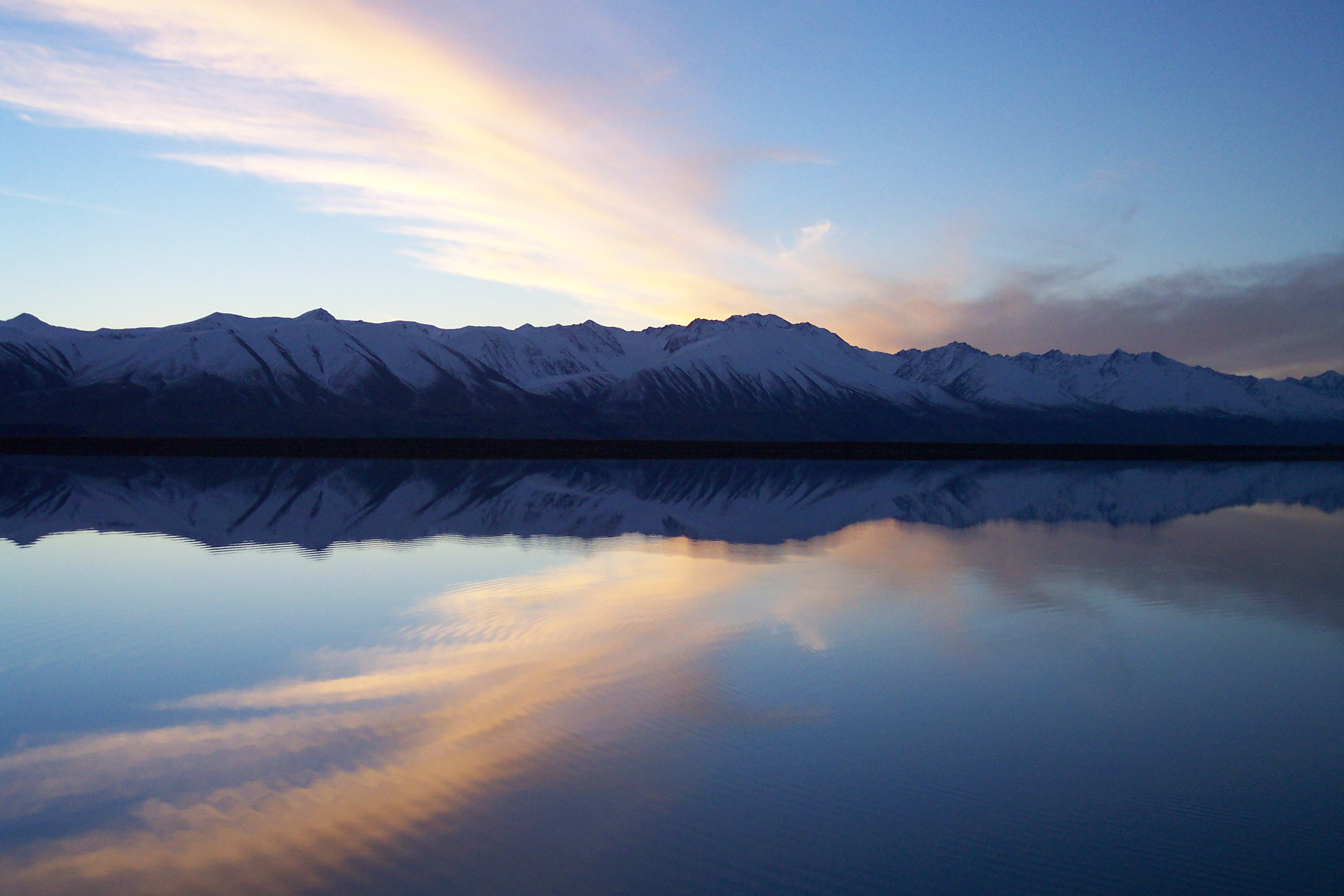
The Ben Ohau Range from the eastern shore of Tekapo B hydrogenerator station headgate pond

The basin extends approximately 100 kilometres (62 mi) north to south, and 40 kilometres (25 mi) east to west. The Southern Alps constitute its western edge. The Mackenzie Basin is located entirely within South Canterbury.

Using State Highway 8, it can be accessed via Burkes Pass (elevation 709m / 2,326 ft) from the north and the Lindis Pass (elevation 965m / 3,166 ft) from the south, or via State Highway 83 through the Waitaki Valley from the east. Aside from these passes, the terrain is generally highest at the northern end and gradually descends in a southward direction.

The basin is drained by the Waitaki River. Prominent rivers crossing the Mackenzie Basin include the Ahuriri, the Hakataramea and the Tekapo Rivers. Lakes Ōhau, Pukaki, Alexandrina and Tekapo lie within the Mackenzie Basin, as do the artificial hydroelectric lakes of Ruataniwha, Benmore and Aviemore.

== Settlement and activities ==
Sparsely populated, and with only four settlements (Lake Tekapo, population <500; Mount Cook Village, population <150; Twizel, population <1,000; and Omarama, population <400), the Mackenzie Country comprises an area of huge glacial lakes and snow-capped mountains, particularly favoured by tourists and skiers.

The Ōhau skifield near Omarama, and Roundhill and Mount Dobson Ski Areas at Lake Tekapo, are small commercial skifields popular amongst many people living in Canterbury and Otago.

The Mackenzie Country is frequently utilised as the principal and second-unit location for television commercials, documentaries, and motion pictures, including much of Peter Jackson's The Lord of the Rings film trilogy and The Hobbit film trilogy.

Gliding is another common activity within the Mackenzie Basin, and the area was host to a Gliding World Cup event in 1995, as well as being the home of several gliding clubs, airfields, and numerous private glider pilots, of both amateur and professional status.

== International Dark Sky Reserve ==
Due to its clean, dry and dark sky, the Mackenzie Basin serves as an important area for New Zealand-based astronomy, with a number of related facilities located there, including the nation's premier astronomical observatory, the University of Canterbury's Mount John University Observatory, and several amateur observatories. Astronomy-related tourism is an increasing contributor to the area's economy, with more astro-tourism ventures in development near Lake Tekapo, Mount Cook village (planetarium) and Omarama. Each June the annual mid winter star party is held at new moon on the Omarama airfield.

In June 2012, an area of 430,000 hectares (1,100,000 acres) including Aoraki/Mount Cook National Park and the Mackenzie Basin was declared the Aoraki Mackenzie International Dark Sky Reserve by the International Dark-Sky Association. At the time of the designation in 2012, the reserve was the largest in the world, and the only reserve of its type in the Southern Hemisphere.

== Demographics ==
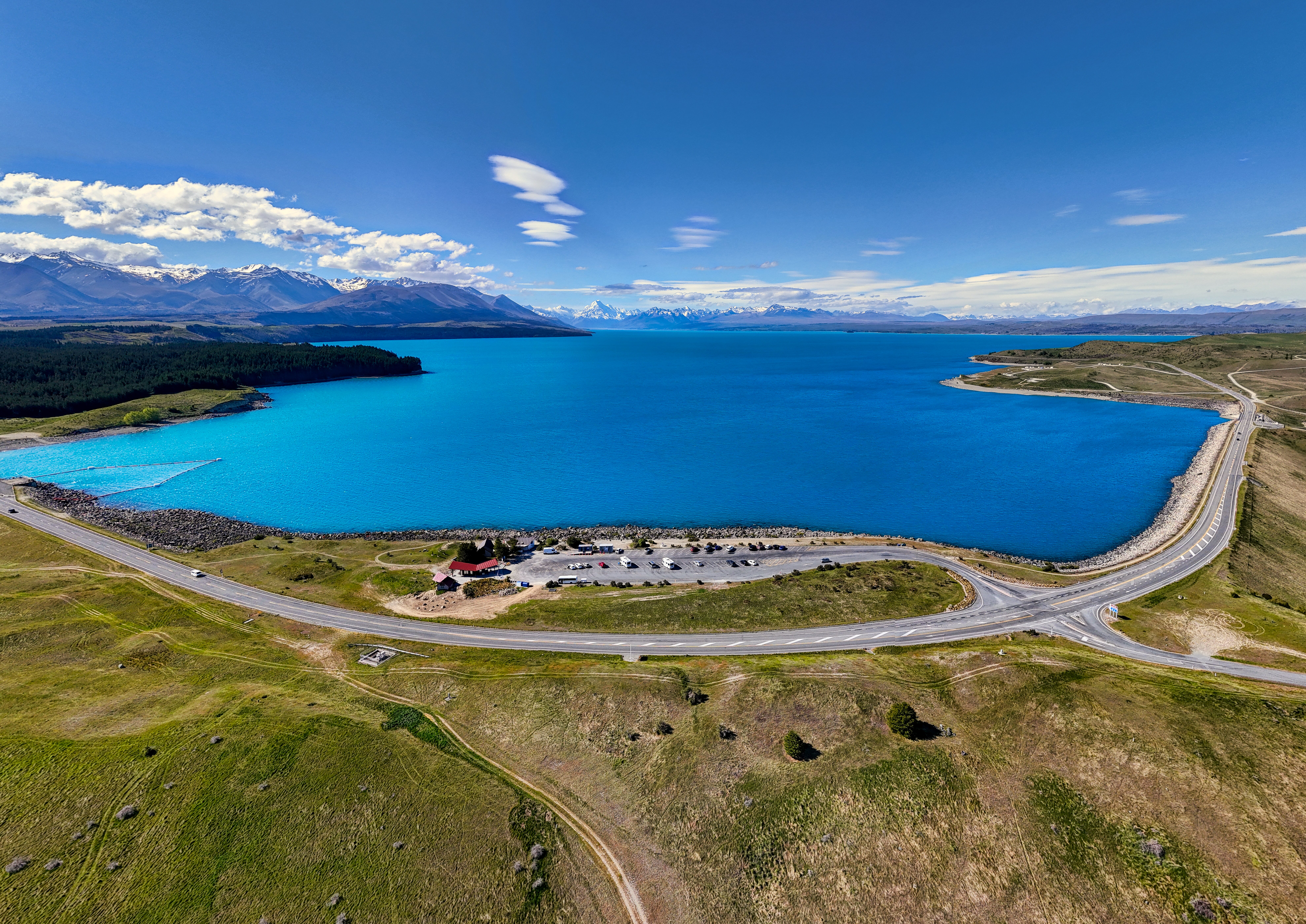
Aoraki / Mount Cook from Lake Pukaki

The statistical area of Mackenzie Lakes corresponds to the portion of the Mackenzie Basin within the Mackenzie District. It includes Mt Cook Village and Lake Tekapo, but not Twizel. Mackenzie Lakes covers 5,139.71 km^{2} (1,984.45 sq mi) and had an estimated population of 1,300 as of June 2025, with a population density of 0.25 people per km^{2}.

Historical population
Year	Pop.	±% p.a.
2006	783	—
2013	837	+0.96%
2018	1,119	+5.98%
2023	1,131	+0.21%
The 2006 population is for a smaller area of 5,134.25 km^{2}. Source:

Mackenzie Lakes had a population of 1,131 in the 2023 New Zealand census, an increase of 12 people (1.1%) since the 2018 census, and an increase of 294 people (35.1%) since the 2013 census. There were 591 males, 534 females, and 3 people of other genders in 747 dwellings. 4.2% of people identified as LGBTIQ+. The median age was 35.8 years (compared with 38.1 years nationally). There were 147 people (13.0%) aged under 15 years, 249 (22.0%) aged 15 to 29, 579 (51.2%) aged 30 to 64, and 150 (13.3%) aged 65 or older.

People could identify as more than one ethnicity. The results were 68.7% European (Pākehā); 5.3% Māori; 2.1% Pasifika; 22.3% Asian; 5.8% Middle Eastern, Latin American and African New Zealanders (MELAA); and 2.9% other, which includes people giving their ethnicity as "New Zealander". English was spoken by 95.8%, Māori by 0.8%, and other languages by 27.3%. No language could be spoken by 1.9% (e.g. too young to talk). The percentage of people born overseas was 43.8, compared with 28.8% nationally.

Religious affiliations were 24.7% Christian, 1.3% Hindu, 2.4% Islam, 2.9% Buddhist, and 1.6% other religions. People who answered that they had no religion were 59.7%, and 7.2% of people did not answer the census question.

Of those at least 15 years old, 282 (28.7%) people had a bachelor's or higher degree, 435 (44.2%) had a post-high school certificate or diploma, and 261 (26.5%) people exclusively held high school qualifications. The median income was $43,800, compared with $41,500 nationally. 72 people (7.3%) earned over $100,000 compared to 12.1% nationally. The employment status of those at least 15 was 678 (68.9%) full-time, 132 (13.4%) part-time, and 9 (0.9%) unemployed.

== Environmental issues ==
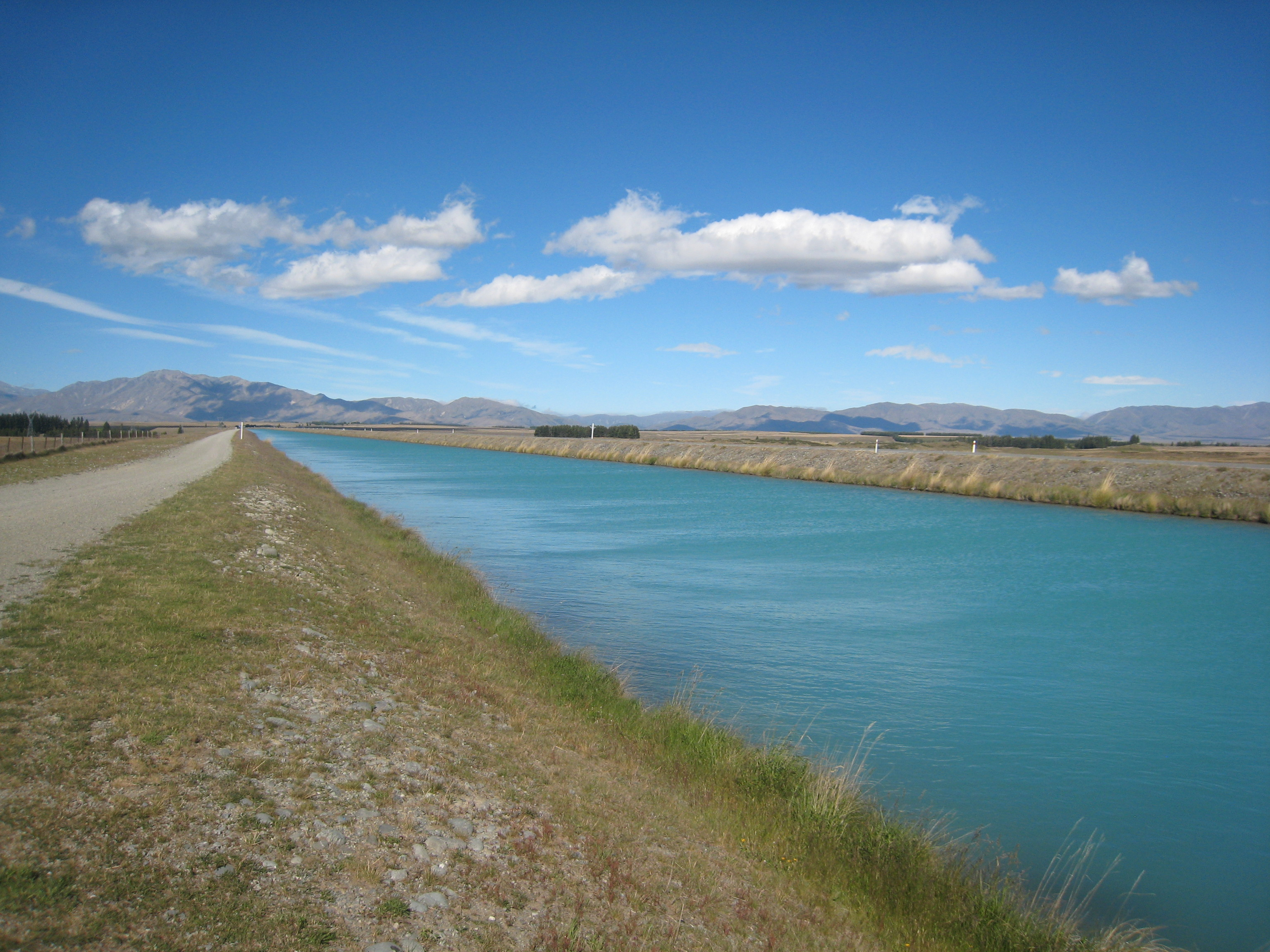
Many canals have been built in the Basin, diverting water to generate hydroelectricity.

The original vegetation cover prior to human settlement has been completely transformed in the basin and indeed most of the surrounding Canterbury-Otago tussock grasslands ecoregion, initially due to fires lit by Māori and European settlers, and in more recent times by farming activity and by pests.

The extensive network of canals for hydroelectric schemes posed a threat to the black stilt (or kakī), an endangered river wading bird. A captive breeding programme was set up and it is administered by the Department of Conservation.

The Mackenzie Basin is one of the areas where wilding conifers proliferate. These weed trees cover large areas sometimes to a very high density and therefore excluding native vegetation and reducing the amount of available pasture. Some areas have control measures in place to prevent the trees from spreading.

Rabbits are a common invasive species in the area affect both agricultural production and biodiversity. Rabbit numbers dropped after the introduction of rabbit haemorrhagic disease virus (RCD) but are now increasing. The Department of Conservation has plans to drop sodium fluoroacetate (1080) laced poison bait to control the rabbit numbers. This is seen as necessary due to the disproportionally high number of threatened plant species in the Mackenzie Basin. The plan attracted opposition at submission hearings.

There is currently a high demand for water to irrigate the Mackenzie Basin, with 126 resource consents from 36 applicants before Environment Canterbury as of mid-2009. The water would be used to irrigate an area of 27,125 hectares (67,030 acres), but the schemes are opposed by many locals and the Department of Conservation for the potential ecological effects, and since it may clash with a proposed Mackenzie Basin Drylands Park.
