= Cloudy Peak =

Mountain in New Zealand

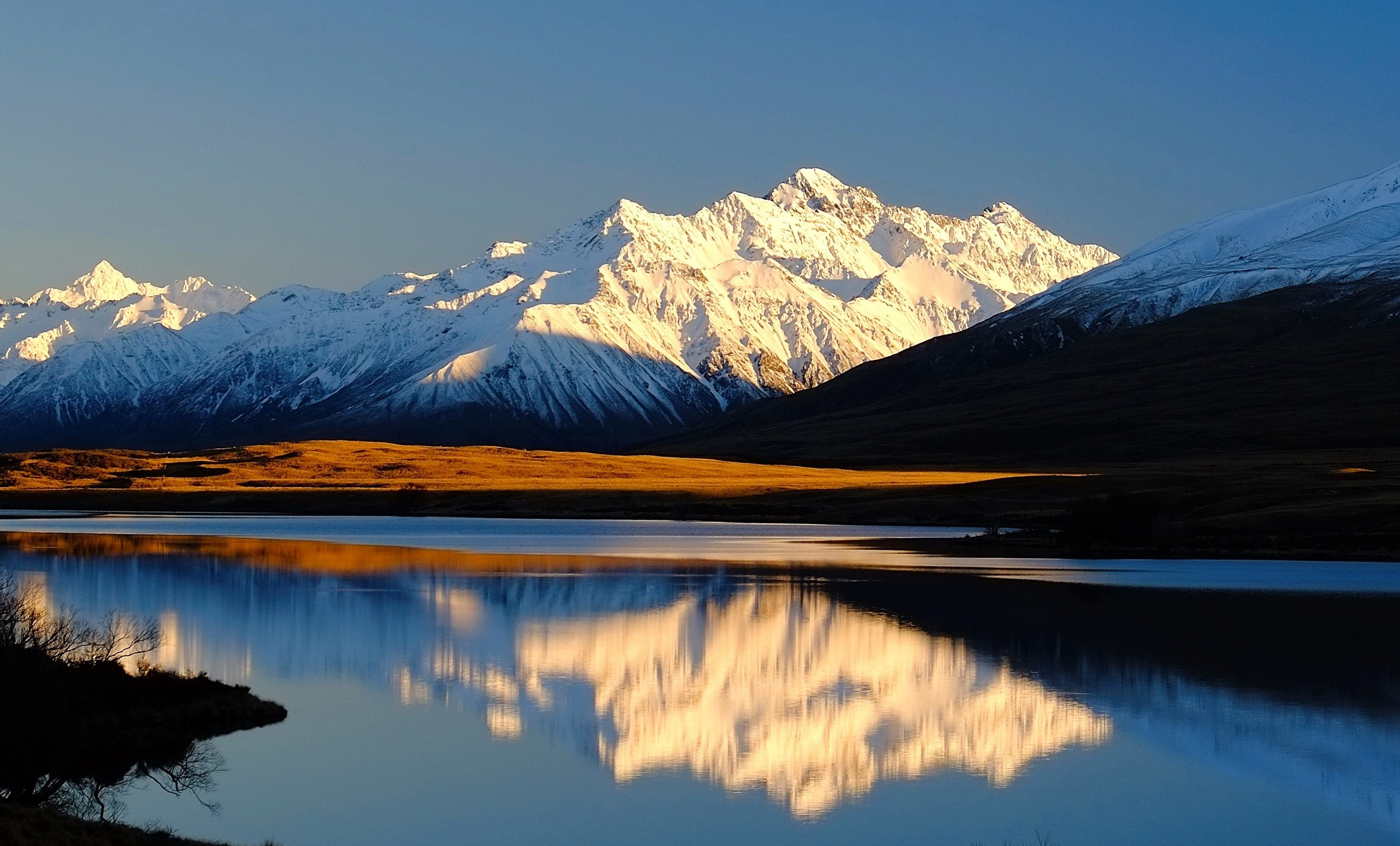
- Southeast aspect, from Lake Clearwater

Highest point
- Elevation: 2,403 m (7,884 ft)
- Prominence: 503 m (1,650 ft)
- Isolation: 11.27 km (7.00 mi)
- Listing: Highest mountains of New Zealand
- Coordinates: 43.461°S 170.780°E

Geography
- Location within New Zealand
- Interactive map of Cloudy Peak
- Location: South Island
- Country: New Zealand
- Region: Canterbury
- Parent range: Southern Alps; Cloudy Peak Range
- Topo map(s): NZMS260 J35; Topo50 BX18

Climbing
- First ascent: 1931

Cloudy Peak is a 2,403-metre-elevation (7,884-foot) mountain in the Canterbury Region of New Zealand.

== Description ==
Cloudy Peak is the highest point of the Cloudy Peak Range which is a subrange of the Southern Alps. It is situated 165 kilometres (103 mi) west of the city of Christchurch in the Canterbury Region of South Island. Precipitation runoff from the mountain drains west to the Havelock River via Cloudy Stream, and east into the Clyde River. Topographic relief is significant as the summit rises 1,100 metres (3,609 feet) above Cloudy Stream in one kilometre and 1,600 metres (5,249 feet) above Clyde River in three kilometres. The first ascent of the summit was made in December 1931 by Bryan Barrer and Frank Askin via the North Ridge. The nearest higher peak is Alma, 11 km to the south-southwest. The mountain's descriptive toponym may have been given by Julius von Haast in the 1860s, with it appearing in publications by 1869. In 1861, Julius von Haast explored this area, reaching the source of the Rangitata River which is immediately below Cloudy Peak.

== Climate ==
Based on the Köppen climate classification, Cloudy Peak is located in a marine west coast (Cfb) climate zone. Prevailing westerly winds blow moist air from the Tasman Sea onto the mountains, where the air is forced upward by the mountains (orographic lift), causing moisture to drop in the form of rain or snow. The months of December through February offer the most favourable weather for viewing or climbing this peak.

== Climbing ==
Climbing routes on Cloudy Peak:

- North Ridge – Bryan Barrer, Frank Askin – (1931)
- South West Ridge – Jack Hill, Rob Rainsbury – (1974)
- The Great Prow – John Entwisle, Chris Moore – (1979)
- Needle Direct – Marty Beare, Lindsay Main – (1980)
- McC's Crack – Roger Garrett, Richard Struthers – (1980)
- The Groke – Fiona Bowie, Richard Thomson – (1987)
- The Quick and the Dead – Brian Alder, Dave Fearnley – (1990)
- Prowess – Steve Elder, Bill McLeod – (1990)
- Windwhistle Arête – Steve Elder – (1990)
- Golly Rodger – Peter Dickson, Bill McLeod – (1992)
- Silver Lining – S. Fortune, J. Grinsted, S. Chand – (2017)
- The Whole Nine Yards – Grant Piper, Bernie Frankpitt, Greg Low – (2021)
- South East Ridge – FA unknown
- East Flank – FA unknown

== See also ==
- List of mountains of New Zealand by height

== Gallery ==
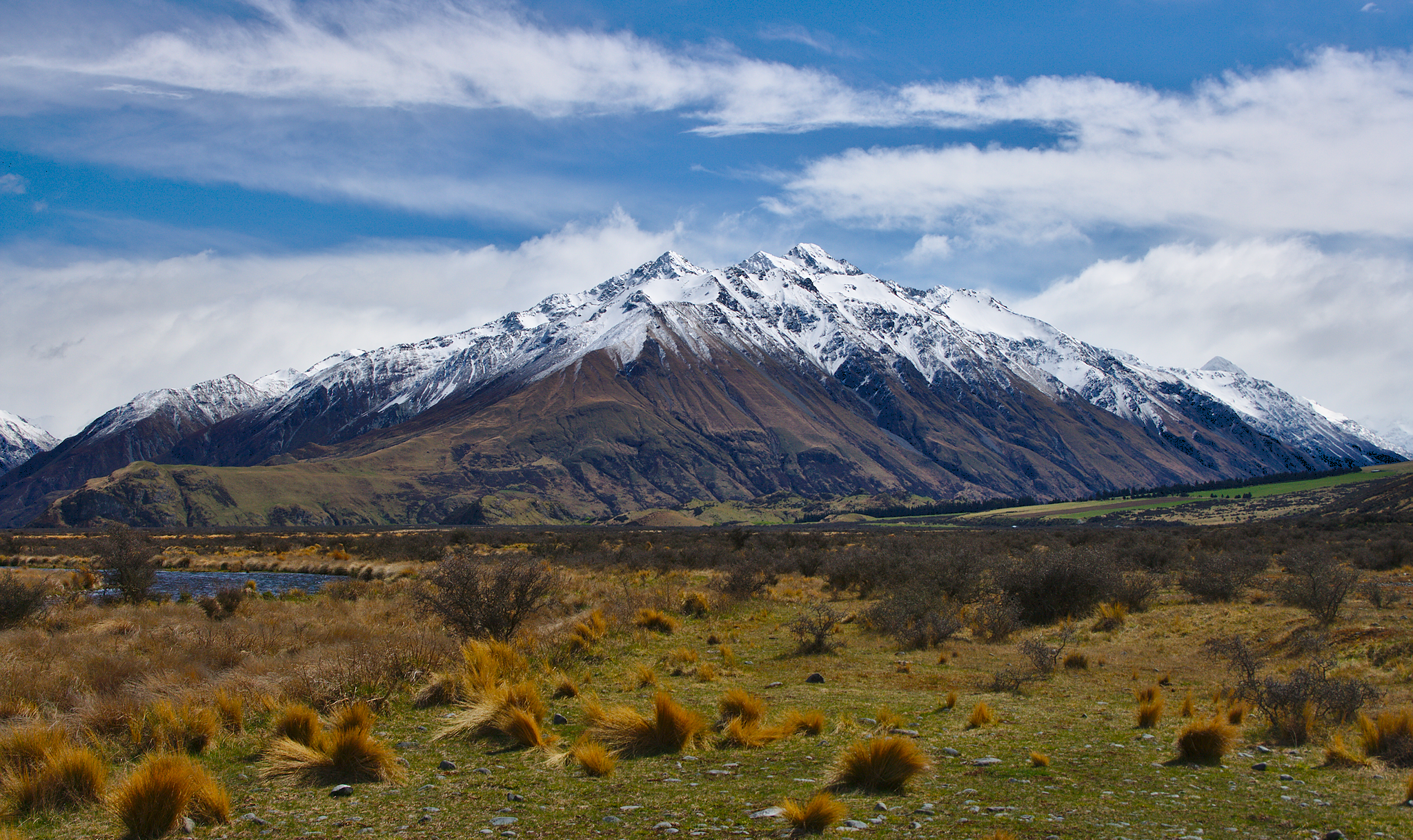
Southeast aspect

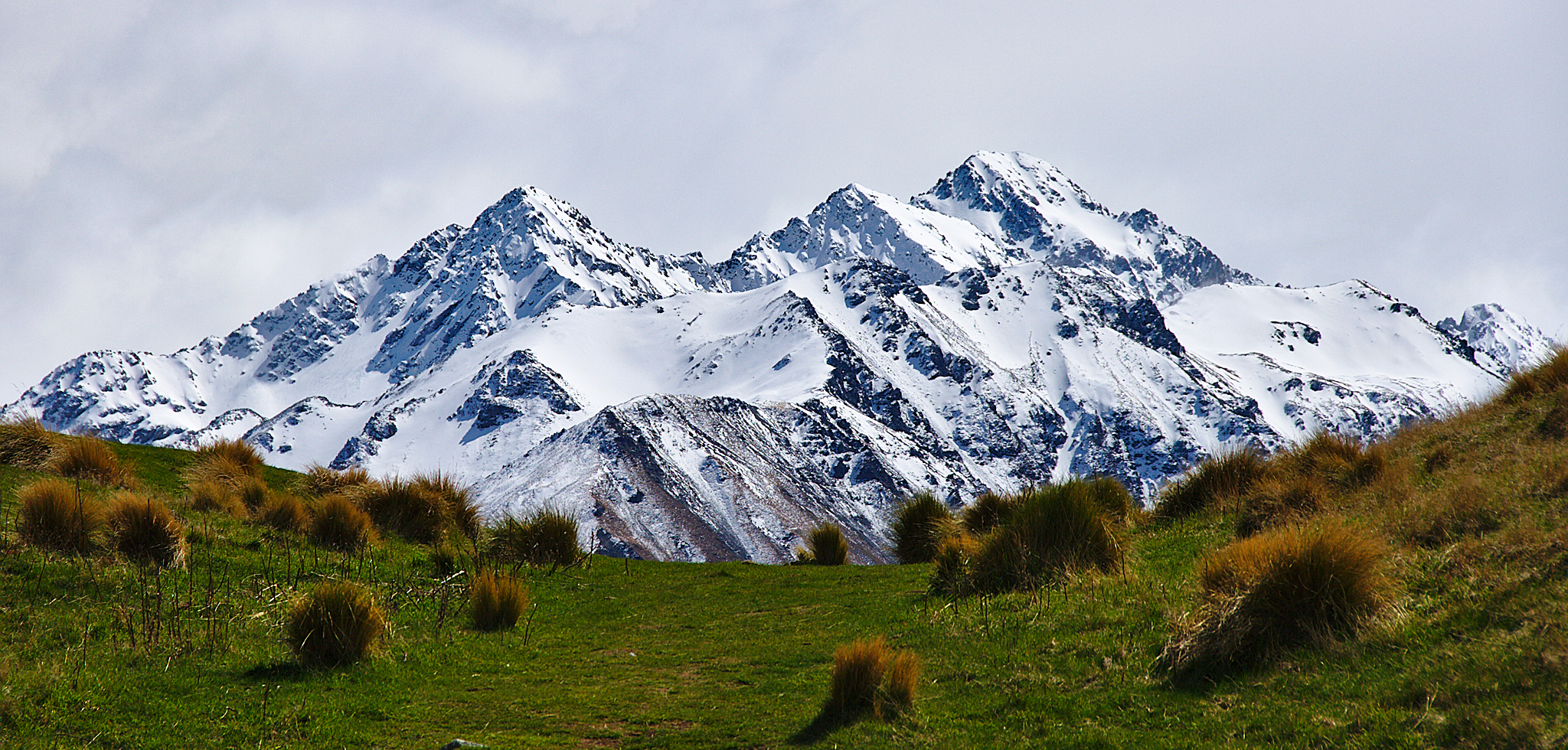
Cloudy Peak from Mt Sunday

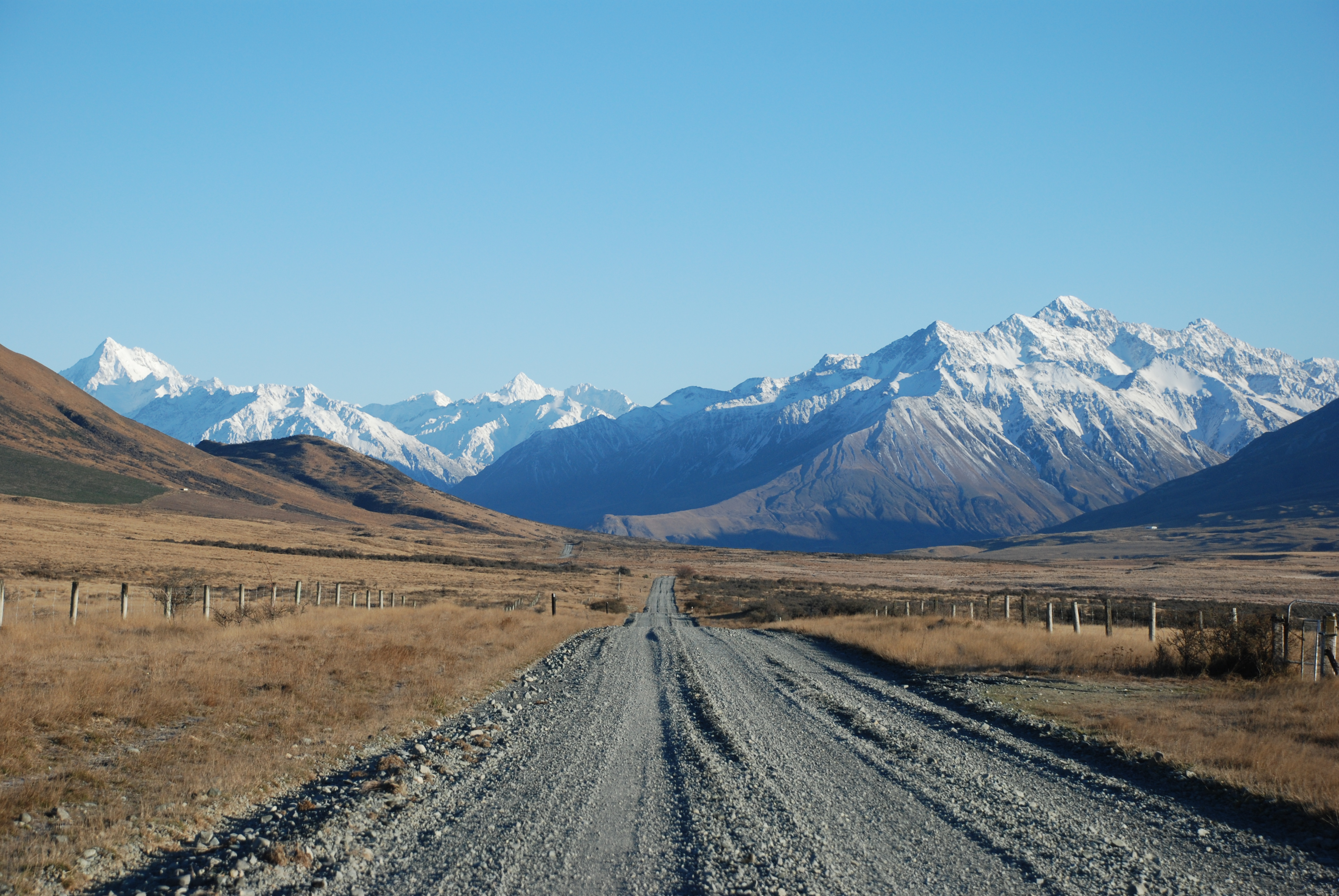
Mount D'Archiac to left, McClure Peak left of centre, Cloudy Peak to right.
