= Forbes River =

Forbes River may refer to:

- Forbes River (New South Wales), a tributary of Hastings River in Australia
- Forbes River (New Zealand), a tributary of Havelock River in New Zealand
- Forbes River (Quebec), a tributary of Caniapiscau River in Canada
