= McClure Peak =

Mountain in New Zealand

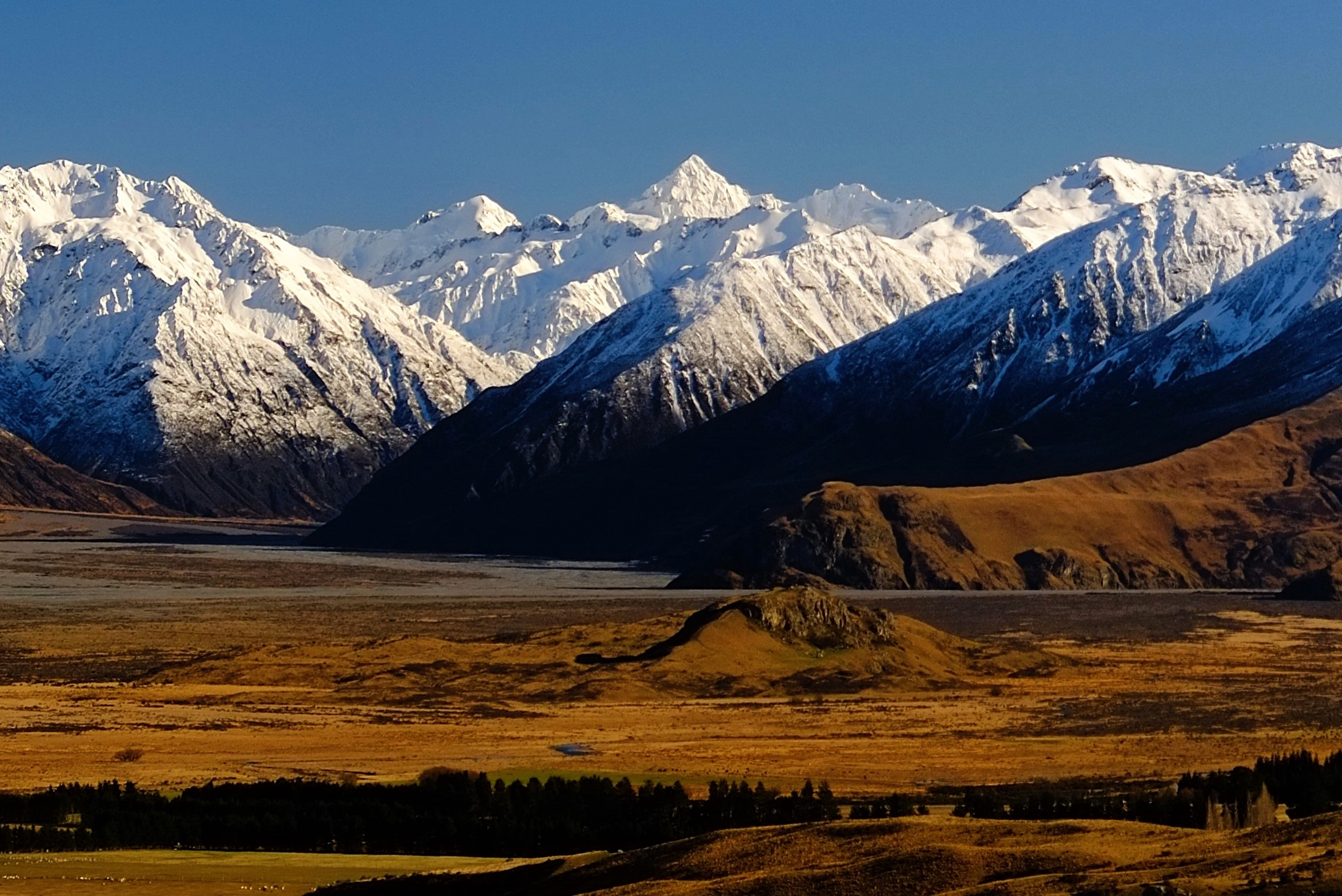
- Southeast aspect

Highest point
- Elevation: 2,486 m (8,156 ft)
- Prominence: 420 m (1,378 ft)
- Isolation: 4.59 km (2.85 mi)
- Listing: Highest mountains of New Zealand
- Coordinates: 43.432°S 170.616°E

Naming
- Etymology: Gordon H. McClure

Geography
- Location within New Zealand
- Interactive map of McClure Peak
- Location: South Island
- Country: New Zealand
- Region: West Coast / Canterbury
- Protected area: Aoraki / Mount Cook National Park; Te Kahui Kaupeka Conservation Park
- Parent range: Southern Alps
- Topo map(s): NZMS260 I35; Topo50 BX17

Climbing
- First ascent: February 1925

McClure Peak is a 2,486-metre-elevation (8,156-foot) mountain in New Zealand.

== Description ==
McClure Peak is located on the crest or Main Divide of the Southern Alps, with the summit set on the boundary shared by the Canterbury and West Coast Regions of the South Island. It is situated 180 kilometres (112 mi) west of the city of Christchurch on the northeastern boundary of Aoraki / Mount Cook National Park. Precipitation runoff from the mountain drains east to the Havelock River via St Winifred Stream, southwest into the headwaters of the Godley River, and northwest to the Perth River via Bettison Stream. Topographic relief is significant as the summit rises 1,280 metres (4,199 feet) above Bettison Stream in approximately two kilometres, and 900 metres (2,953 feet) above St Winifred Glacier in one kilometre. The nearest higher neighbour is Mount D'Archiac, 4.6 km to the southwest. The first ascent of the summit was made in February 1925 by Jack Lippe and Will Kennedy.

== Etymology ==
The mountain was originally named Mount Tyndall by Julius von Haast, but this toponym was transferred to another peak. The present name honours Gordon Hurrell Morland McClure (1859–1947), a local surveyor who worked in this area during the late 1880s.

== Climbing ==
Climbing routes with the first ascents:

- South Ridge via Terra Nova Pass – Will Kennedy, Jack Lippe – (1925)
- West Face – Jack Pattle, Allan Cookson, Charles (Gordon) Buchanan, Neville Barker – (1937)
- North Ridge – Eric de Lacey, Russell Pearce, G.W. Watson – (1967)

== Climate ==
Based on the Köppen climate classification, McClure Peak is located in a marine west coast (Cfb) climate zone, with a tundra climate at the summit. Prevailing westerly winds blow moist air from the Tasman Sea onto the mountains, where the air is forced upward by the mountains (orographic lift), causing moisture to drop in the form of rain or snow. This climate supports the St Winifred and Godley glaciers surrounding this mountain's slopes. The months of December through February offer the most favourable weather for viewing or climbing this peak.

== Gallery ==
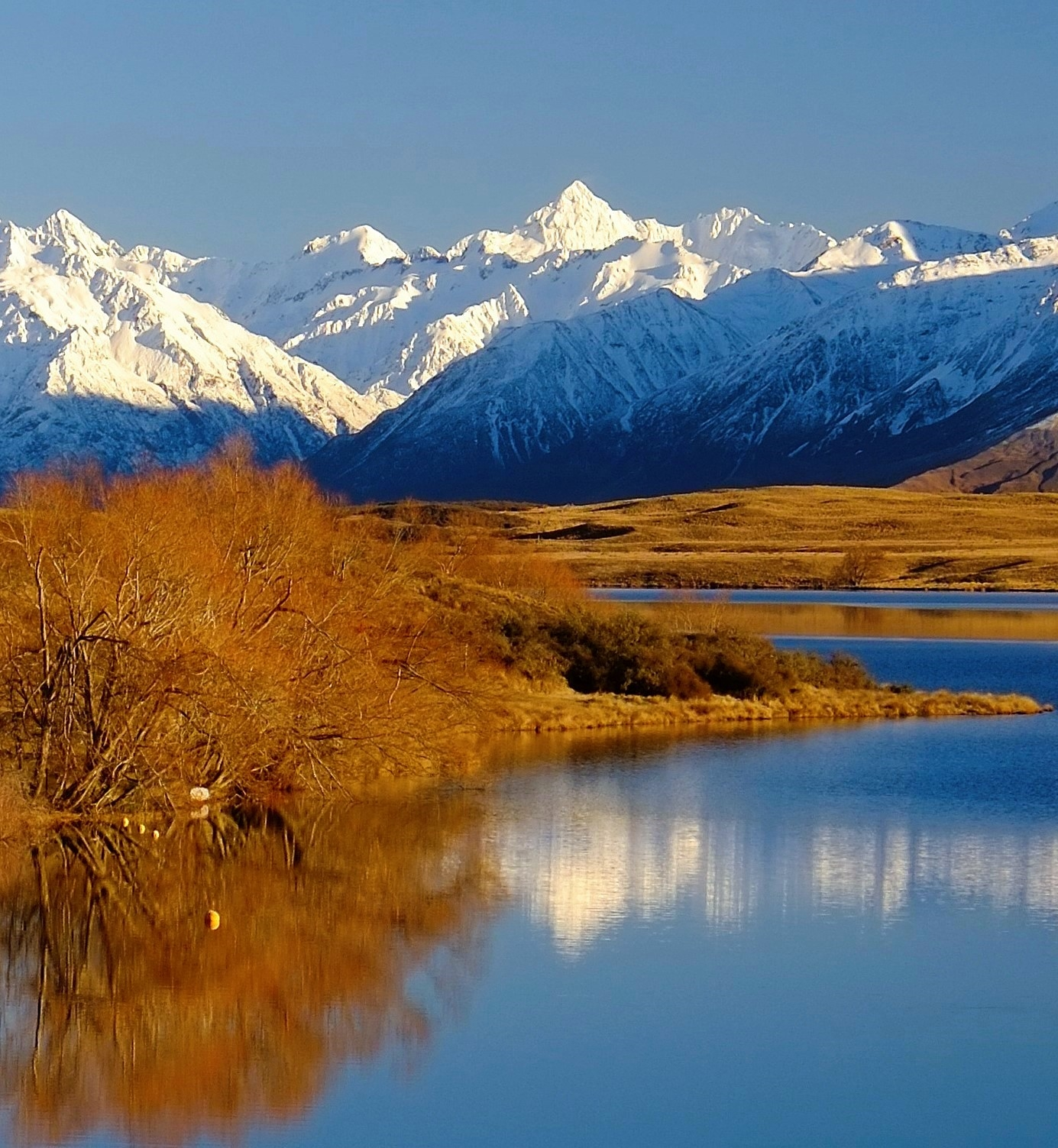
McClure Peak centered on skyline and reflected in Lake Clearwater

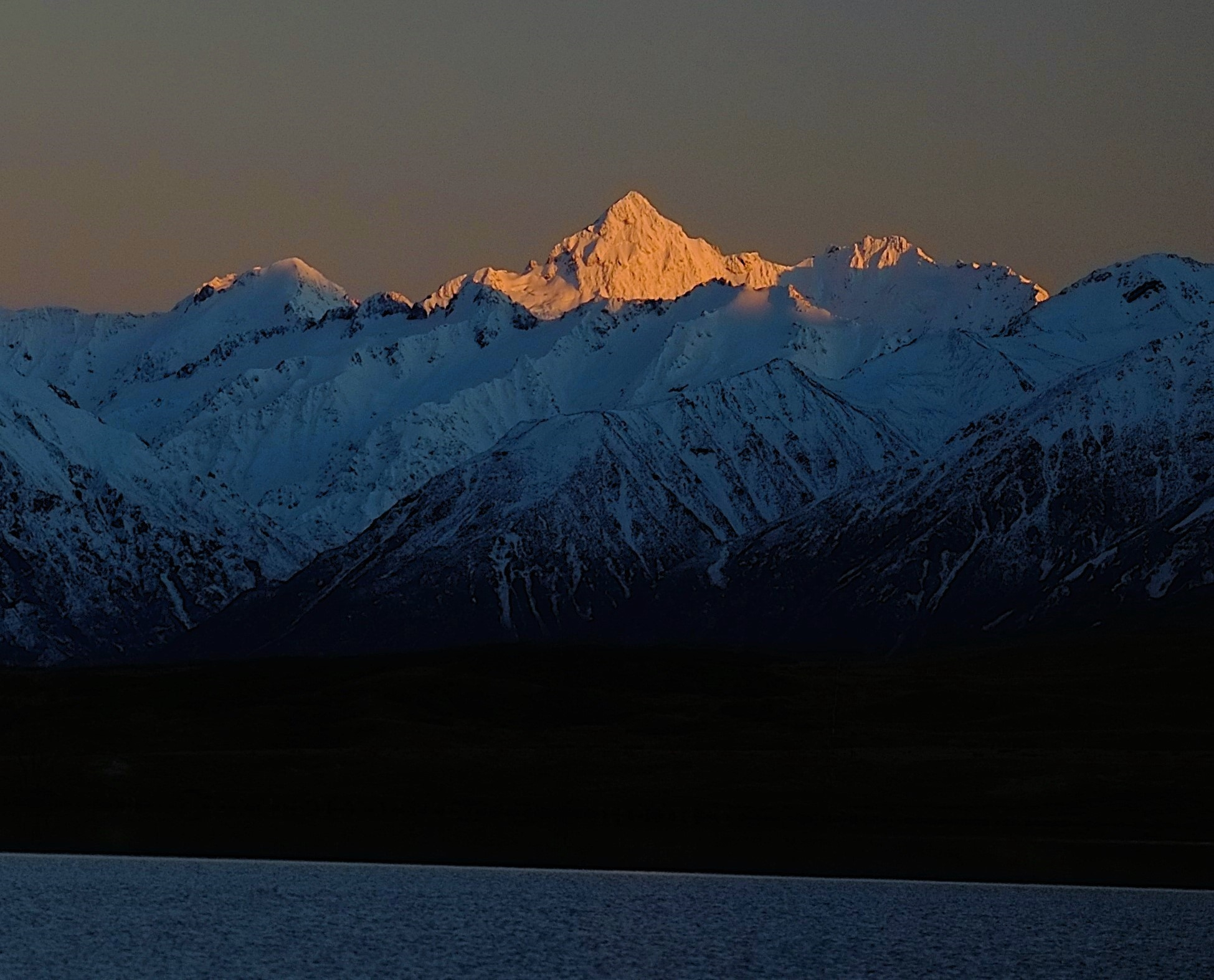
McClure Peak illuminated at dawn

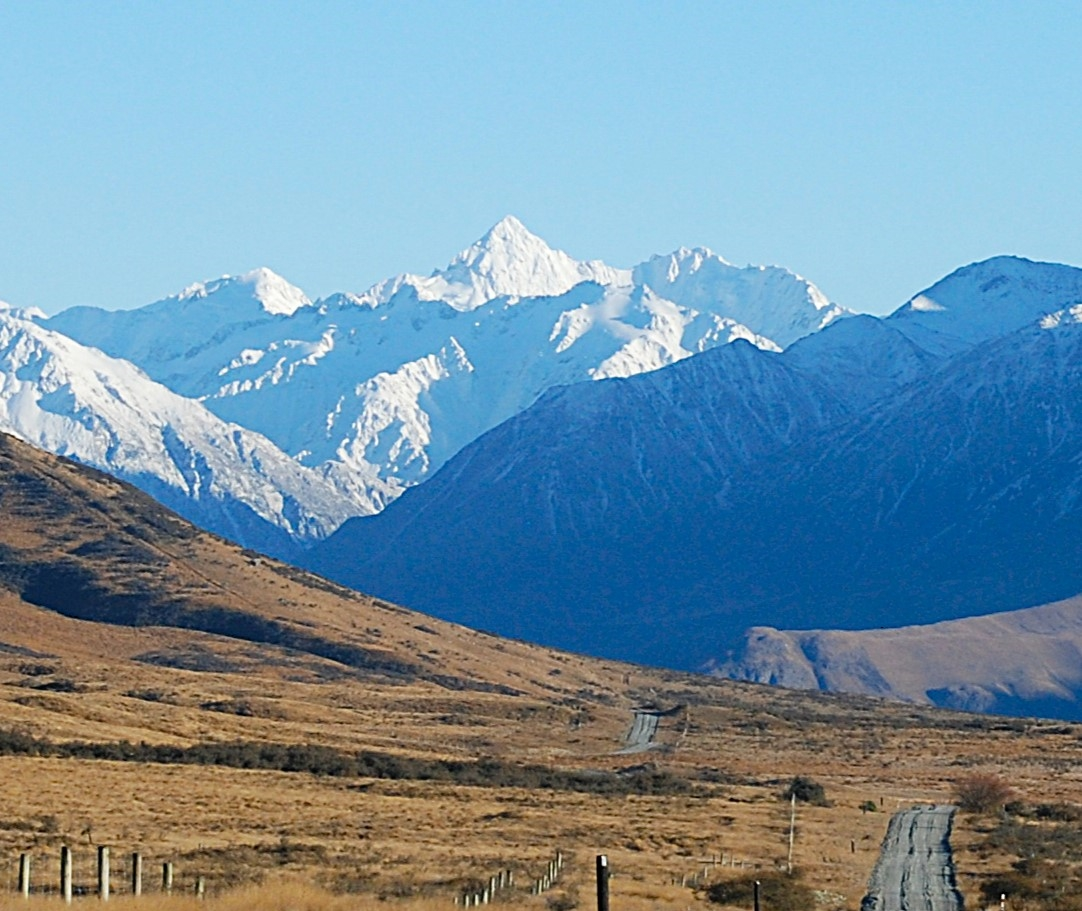
McClure Peak

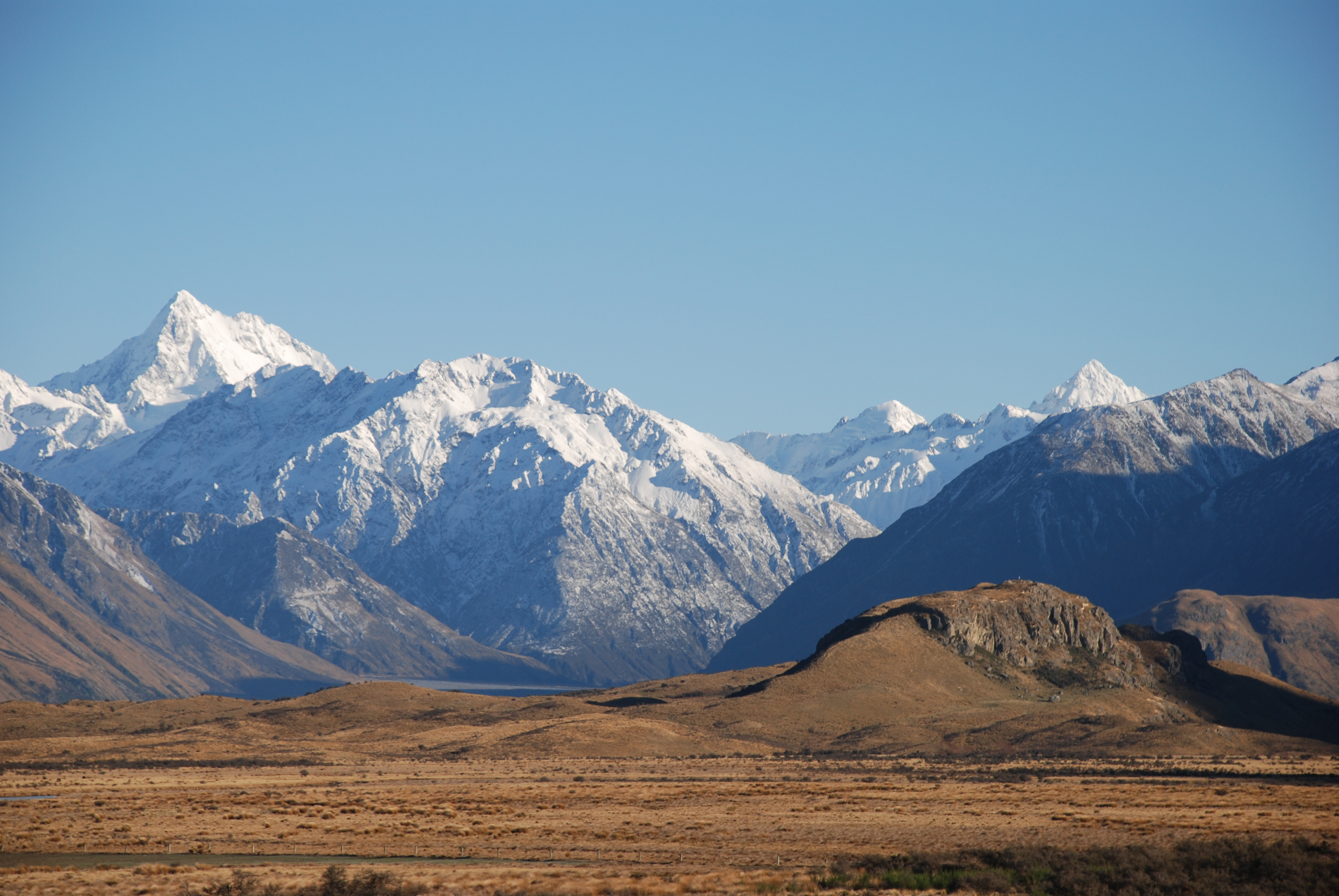
Mount D'Archiac to left, McClure Peak to right on skyline

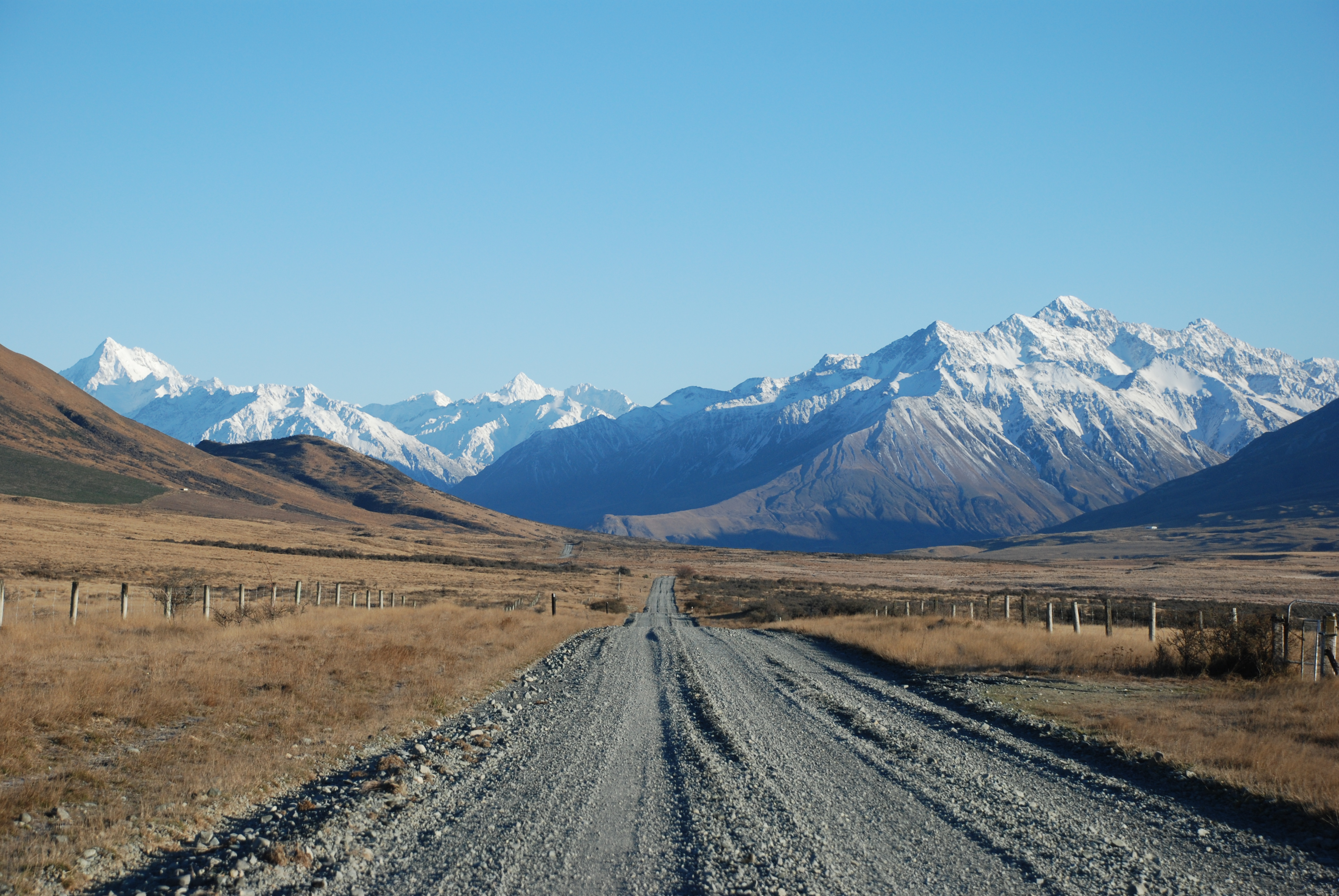
Mount D'Archiac to left, McClure Peak left of centre, Cloudy Peak to right.

== See also ==
- List of mountains of New Zealand by height
