= Mount Forbes (New Zealand) =

Mountain in New Zealand

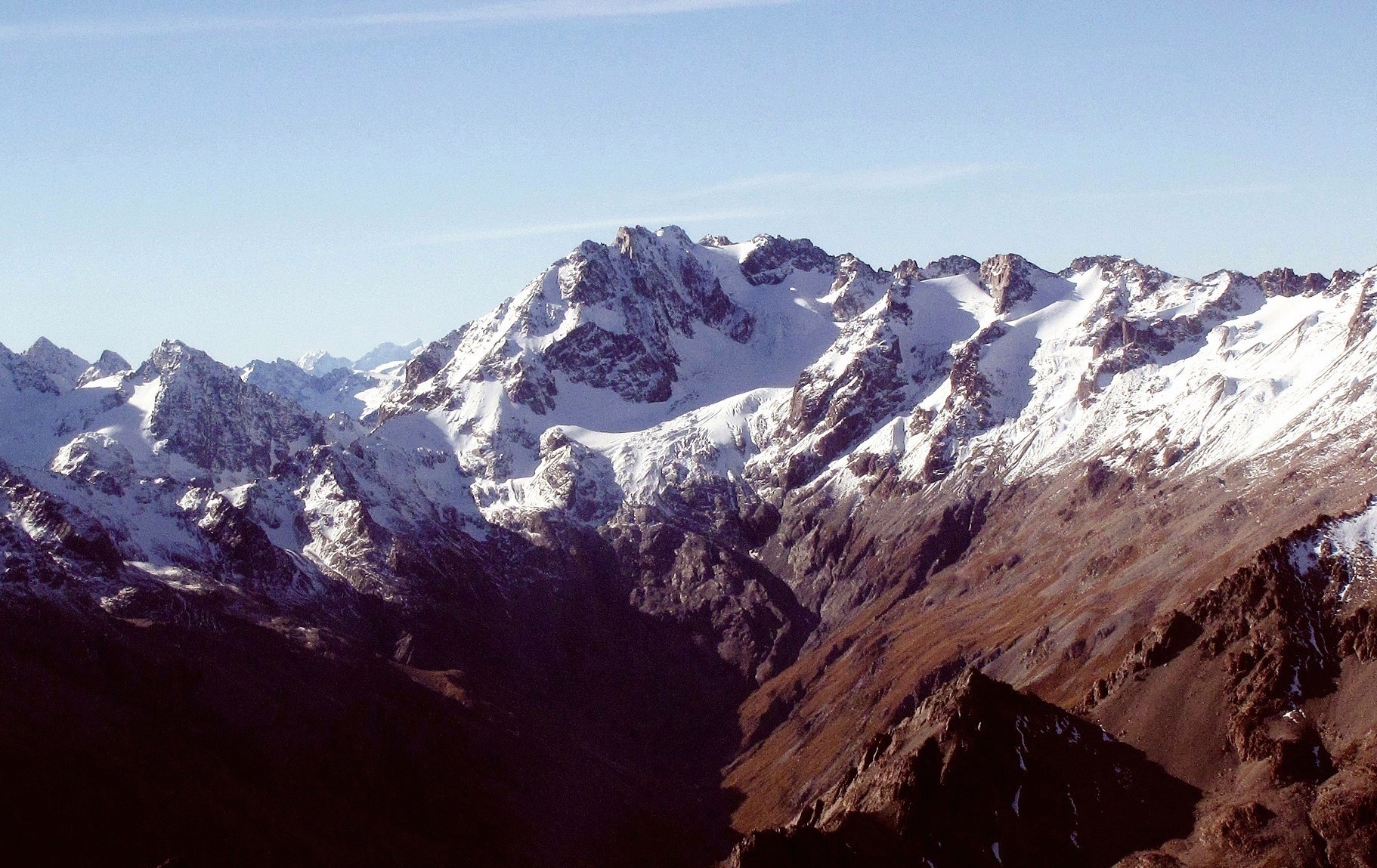
- Southwest aspect

Highest point
- Elevation: 2,583 m (8,474 ft)
- Prominence: 343 m (1,125 ft)
- Isolation: 3.09 km (1.92 mi)
- Listing: Highest mountains of New Zealand
- Coordinates: 43°29′43″S 170°35′16″E

Naming
- Etymology: James David Forbes
- Native name: Tururehekau (Māori)

Geography
- Location within New Zealand
- Interactive map of Mount Forbes
- Location: South Island
- Country: New Zealand
- Region: Canterbury
- Protected area: Aoraki / Mount Cook National Park
- Parent range: Southern Alps; Sibbald Range
- Topo map(s): NZMS260 I35; Topo50 BX17

Geology
- Rock age: Carboniferous-Cretaceous
- Rock type: Greywacke

Climbing
- First ascent: February 1912

Mount Forbes is a 2,583-metre-elevation (8,474-foot) mountain in the Canterbury Region of New Zealand.

== Description ==
Mount Forbes is located at the northern end of the Sibbald Range which is a subrange of the Southern Alps. It is situated 180 kilometres (112 mi) west of the city of Christchurch and is set on the northeastern boundary of Aoraki / Mount Cook National Park in the Canterbury Region of South Island. Precipitation runoff from the mountain drains east into the headwaters of the Macaulay River, and west to the Godley River via Separation and McKinnon streams. Topographic relief is significant as the summit rises 1,200 metres (3,937 feet) above Macaulay River in two kilometres and 1,200 metres (3,937 feet) above Separation Stream in two kilometres. The nearest higher peak is Mount D'Archiac, three kilometres to the north. The first ascent of the summit was made in February 1912 by Hugh F. Wright and Jim P. Murphy.

== Etymology ==
The mountain was named in 1861 by Julius von Haast to honour James David Forbes (1809–1868), a Scottish physicist, glaciologist, and professor at the University of Edinburgh. The Māori name for this mountain is "Tururehekau". This mountain's toponym has been officially approved by the New Zealand Geographic Board.

== Climbing ==
Climbing routes on Mount Forbes:

- Ballium Snowfield – First ascent by Edgar Williams – (1932)
- South Face – Ian Powell, Arthur Thompson, Frank Simpson, L. Pracy, T. Cameron – (1940)
- South East Ridge – Stan Conway, Bernie McClelland, Jack Pattle, Arthur Dixon, Dave Parr – (1950)
- North West Ridge

== Climate ==
Based on the Köppen climate classification, Mount Forbes is located in a marine west coast (Cfb) climate zone, with a tundra climate at the summit. Prevailing westerly winds blow moist air from the Tasman Sea onto the mountains, where the air is forced upward by the mountains (orographic lift), causing moisture to drop in the form of rain or snow. This climate supports small unnamed glaciers on this mountain's slopes. The months of December through February offer the most favourable weather for viewing or climbing this peak.

== Gallery ==
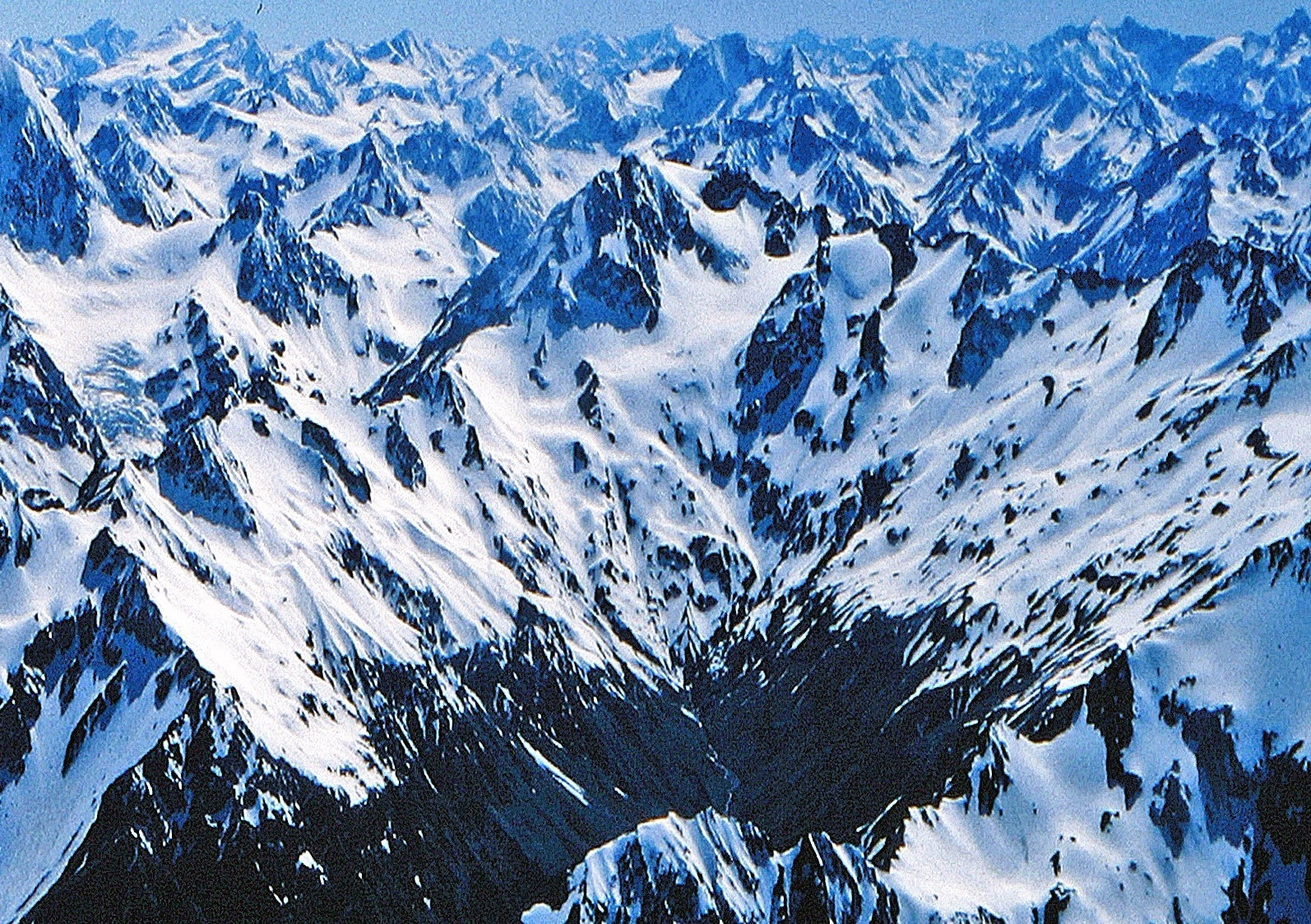
Mount Forbes centred. Aerial view from southwest.

== See also ==
- List of mountains of New Zealand by height
- Torlesse Composite Terrane
