= Donald Sutherland (explorer) =

New Zealand soldier, explorer, accommodation-house keeper

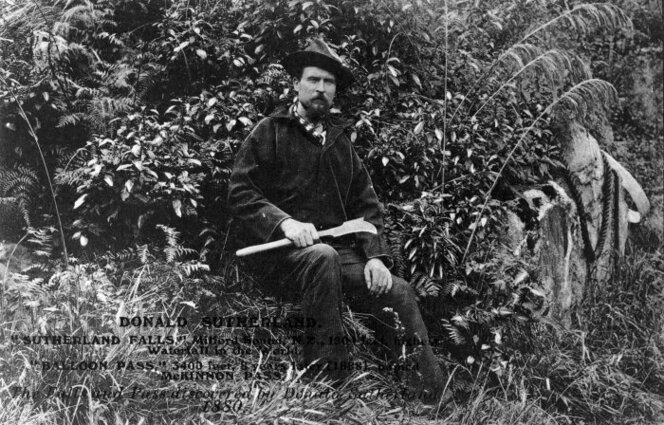
- Donald Sutherland in 1888
- Born: c. 1843/1844; Wick, Caithness, Scotland
- Died: 24 October 1919 (aged 75/76); Milford Sound, New Zealand
- Occupation(s): Explorer; Soldier

Donald Sutherland (c. 1843/1844 – 24 October 1919) was a Scottish-born New Zealand explorer, active in the late 19th century. Born in Wick, he served as a soldier in the Expedition of the Thousand, led by Giuseppe Garibaldi, in the Italian unification wars. Soon afterwards he travelled to New Zealand where he prospected for gold in Otago. He later joined the New Zealand military and fought in a number of engagements of the New Zealand Wars. In 1877, he settled in Milford Sound and lived as a hermit for a number of years, exploring the region. He later married and, with his wife, ran an accommodation facility for the increasing number of tourists visiting Milford Sound until his death in October 1919. The Sutherland Falls, located near Milford Sound and the highest waterfall in New Zealand, is named for him.

== Early life ==
Donald Sutherland was born in Wick, a coastal town in Scotland, around 1843 or 1844. He was the son of Donald Sutherland, a ropemaker, and Isabella Strachan. As a boy he worked in the fishing industry but desired a more exciting life, and when he was 16, he joined a militia unit stationed at Fort George in nearby Ardersier. He subsequently volunteered to join the forces of Giuseppe Garibaldi, who, supported by the British, was engaged in the Expedition of the Thousand, part of the Italian unification wars. The campaign ended in Naples in September 1860, after which Sutherland returned to the United Kingdom.

== New Zealand ==
After finding employment as a mariner on coastal shipping, Sutherland sailed to New Zealand as part of the crew of the Prince Alfred, deserting the company when the ship arrived at Dunedin. At the time, Otago was experiencing a gold rush after the valuable metal was discovered at Gabriel's Gully. Sutherland made his way to the area and began prospecting for gold. In December 1863, and having not had any success on the gold fields, he went to the North Island and enlisted in the Waikato Militia, then engaged in the New Zealand Wars. He was assigned to the water transport corps, and after hostilities ended in the region, Sutherland was granted a parcel of land at Pukerimu. He abandoned his land allotment in 1866 when he absconded from his unit to join a sealing party heading to Fiordland, in the South Island. Not achieving any success, he returned to gold prospecting, this time on the West Coast.

=== Armed Constabulary service ===
In 1868, having failed again as a gold prospector, Sutherland joined the Armed Constabulary, the colonial regular army. He was involved in the fighting in the South Taranaki during the campaign against the Māori war chief Riwha Tītokowaru. He was also present at the siege of Ngatapa from December 1868 to January 1869, during the East Cape wars. He acted as a scout after fighting at Tauranga-ika and was involved in the pursuit of Tītokowaru's men following their abandonment of the pā (hillfort) there. In the mistaken belief that a bounty was offered for the head of any captives, he decapitated those he caught. He ended the conflict as a corporal and was later a recipient of the New Zealand War Medal.

=== Milford Sound ===
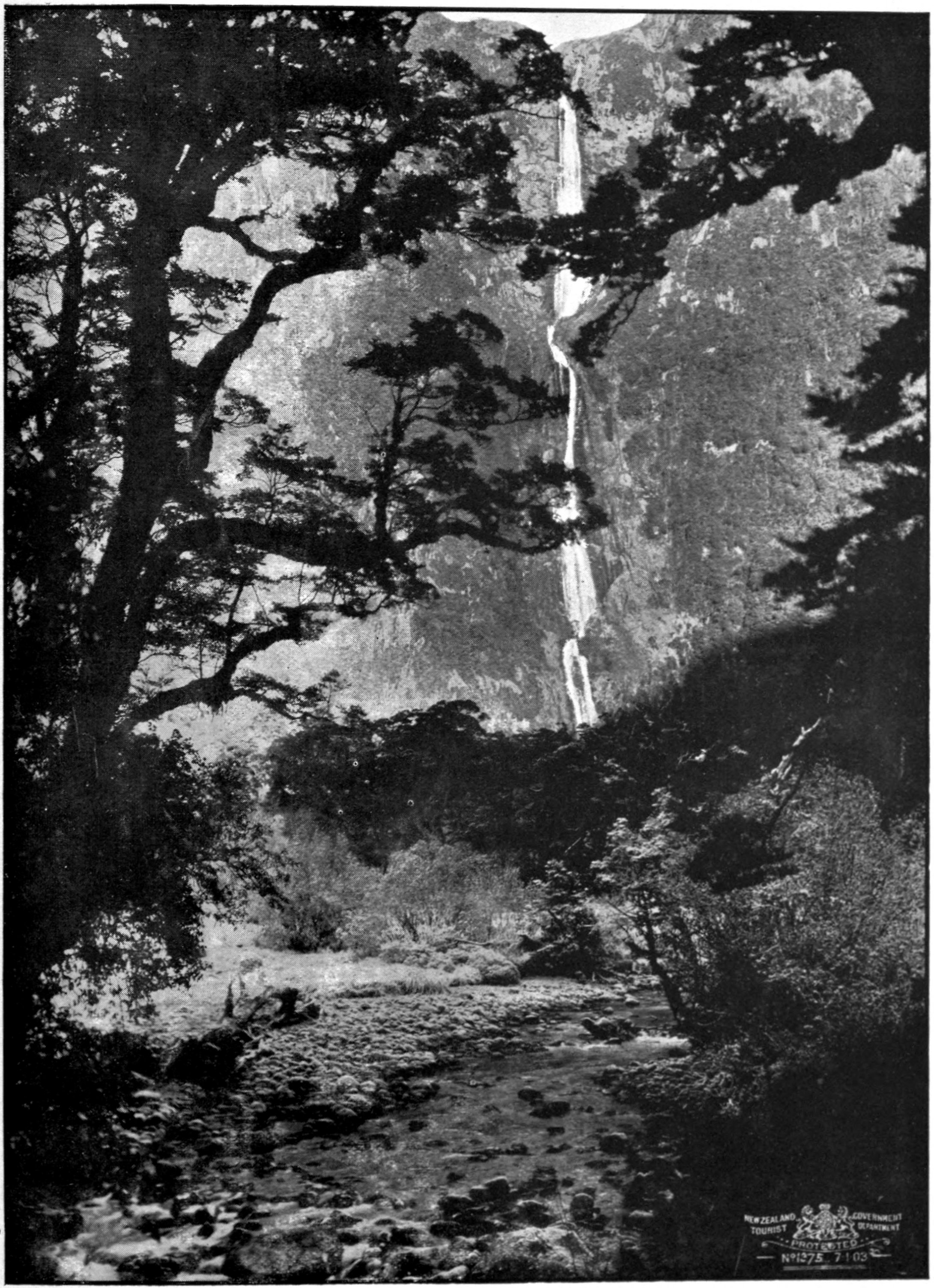
Sutherland Falls, sighted by Donald Sutherland in 1880

Sutherland returned to the sea as a mariner for the New Zealand Government Service Steamer (NZGSS) shipping line. After several years of this work, in 1877 he decided to settle in Fiordland. He had visited the area a number of times while working NZGSS vessels. Sailing from Dunedin with only a dog for company, he reached the Milford Sound on 3 December. Basing himself at Freshwater Basin, a site close to Bowen Falls, he constructed a three-room hut. Further dwellings were built later and he drew up plans for a settlement for what he called the city of Milford. He looked for gold, asbestos and bowenite.

In 1878, Sutherland invited James McKay to join him in his hunt for gold. Finding none, the two used funds and provisions afforded by the Lake County to scout for a route between Milford Sound and Queenstown. He was unsuccessful in finding a pass through the mountains but did locate the track used by Māori to travel between Milford and Bligh Sounds. In doing so, he was the first European to sight the waterfall that is now named for him. Originally it was claimed to be well over 1,000 metres (3,300 ft) in height and the highest in the world, but Sutherland Falls is actually only 580 metres (1,900 ft) high. It is still New Zealand's highest waterfall.

By the early 1880s, McKay had left Milford, believing there was no gold to be had in the area. This left Sutherland as the only permanent resident in Milford Sound. In 1883, while sailing down the coast in his vessel Porpoise, he discovered another feature that is named for him, Sutherland Sound. The same year, he attempted to climb Mitre Peak. His failure to reach the summit was galling and he later attempted to discredit the first ascent made in 1911 by Jim Dennistoun. His observations from his exploration of Milford Sound and the surrounding area were communicated to Alexander McKay, a geologist, who in August 1884 reported these to the Wellington Philosophical Society.

For much of the next several years, Sutherland lived alone in Milford Sound, only receiving visits every six months or so when the NZGSS steamers Hinemoa or Stella called in. In 1888, he was contracted to make a track from Milford through to Sutherland Falls. This took six months, and now forms part of the Milford Track. He made occasional visits to Dunedin, and on one of these, in 1890, he married Elizabeth Samuels, a widower originally from England. The couple, using Elizabeth's money, purchased land on which the Chalet, an accommodation facility, was built. This catered to the increasing number of tourists visiting the area in the summer months via the Milford Track or by ship. Among them was the historian James Cowan, with whom Sutherland scouted in the area for diamonds.

== Later life ==
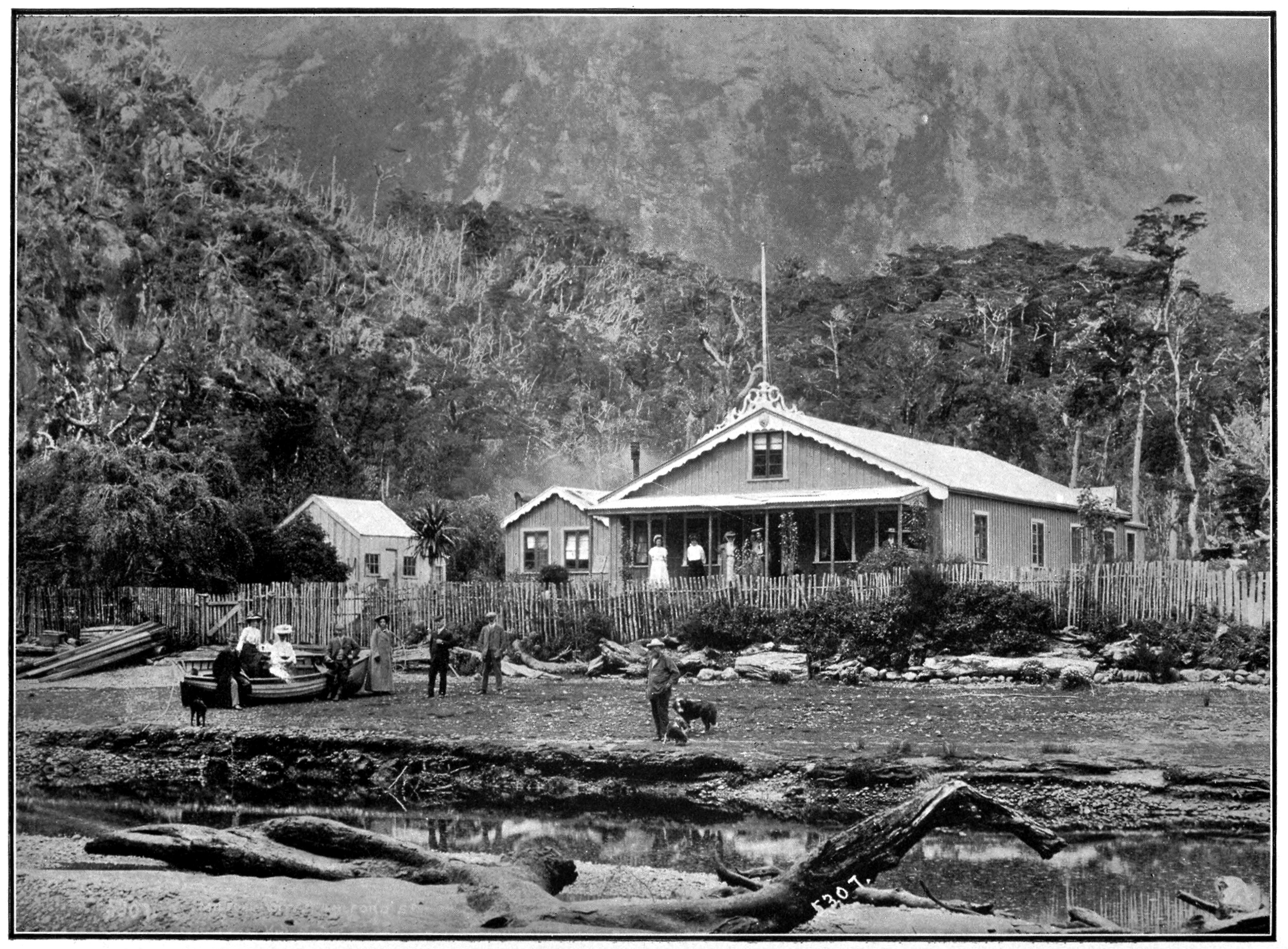
Sutherland's Chalet at Milford Sound

In his later years, Sutherland was joined at Milford Sound by his nephew, William Sutherland, who with his wife helped in the running of the Chalet. By the 1900s, the tourism trade in the area was becoming well developed, encouraged by the government's Tourism Board. In response, Sutherland began raising livestock at Milford for fresh meat. He died at his home on 24 October 1919; he had been in poor health for some time. When he died, his wife was the only individual present at Milford Sound. Unable to bury her large-framed husband, she had to wait five weeks for the next visit of the Hinemoa before his body could be interred. His wife remained at Milford, running the Chalet until she sold it to the New Zealand government in 1922. She stayed on in Milford Sound and died on 10 December 1923. She is buried alongside her husband in a grave behind the Chalet.
