= Mitre Peak =

Mountain in the South Island of New Zealand

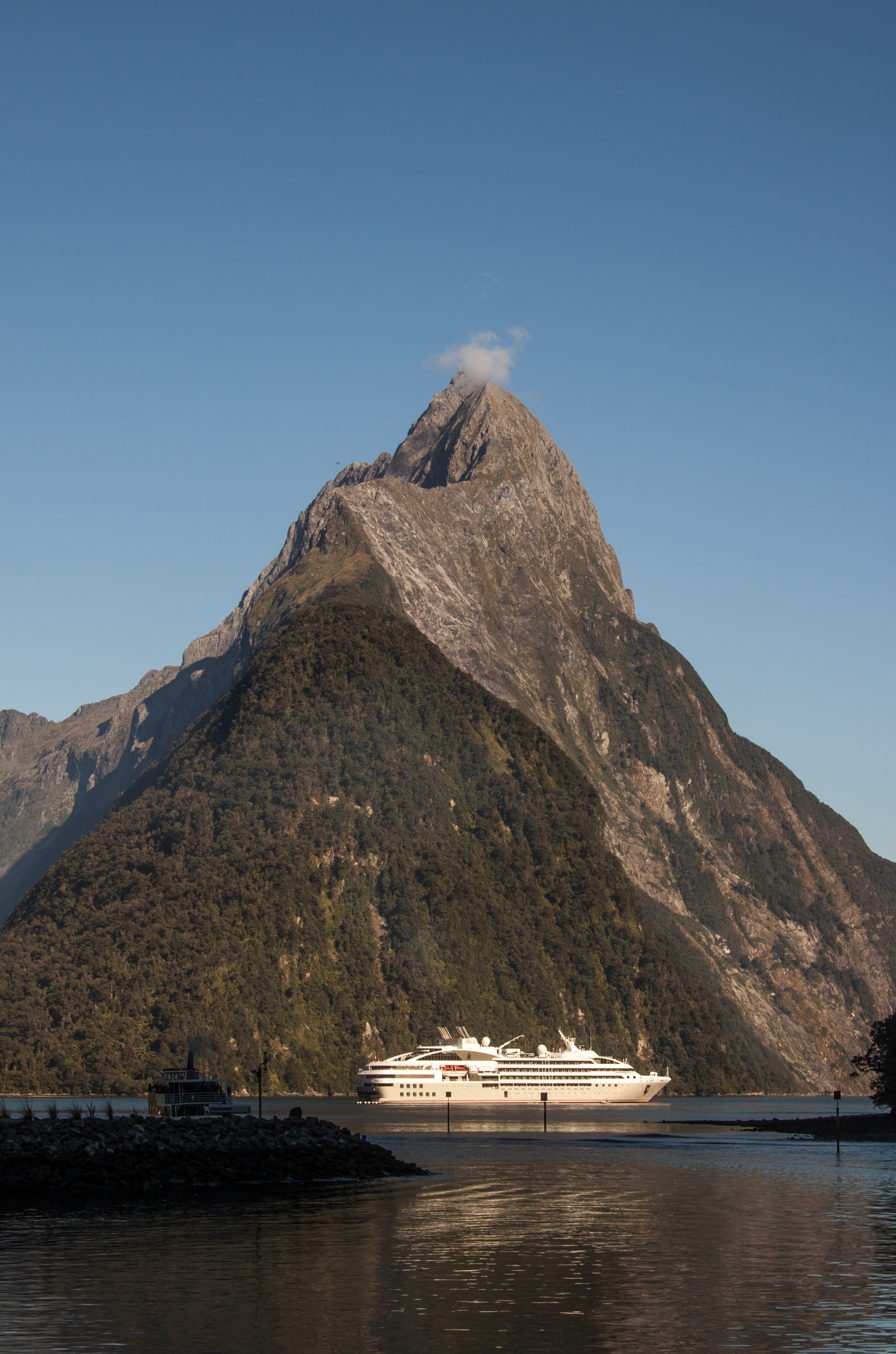
- Mitre Peak, Milford Sound

Highest point
- Elevation: 1,683 m (5,522 ft)
- Prominence: 95 m (312 ft)
- Parent peak: Aoraki / Mount Cook
- Coordinates: 44°37′57″S 167°51′22″E

Geography
- Location within New Zealand
- Location: South Island, New Zealand

Mitre Peak (Māori: Rahotu) is a mountain in the South Island of New Zealand; it is located on the shore of Milford Sound.

== Etymology ==
The mountain was named by Captain John Lort Stokes of HMS Acheron, who found its shape reminiscent of the mitre headwear of Christian bishops. The Māori name for the peak is Rahotu.

== Geography ==
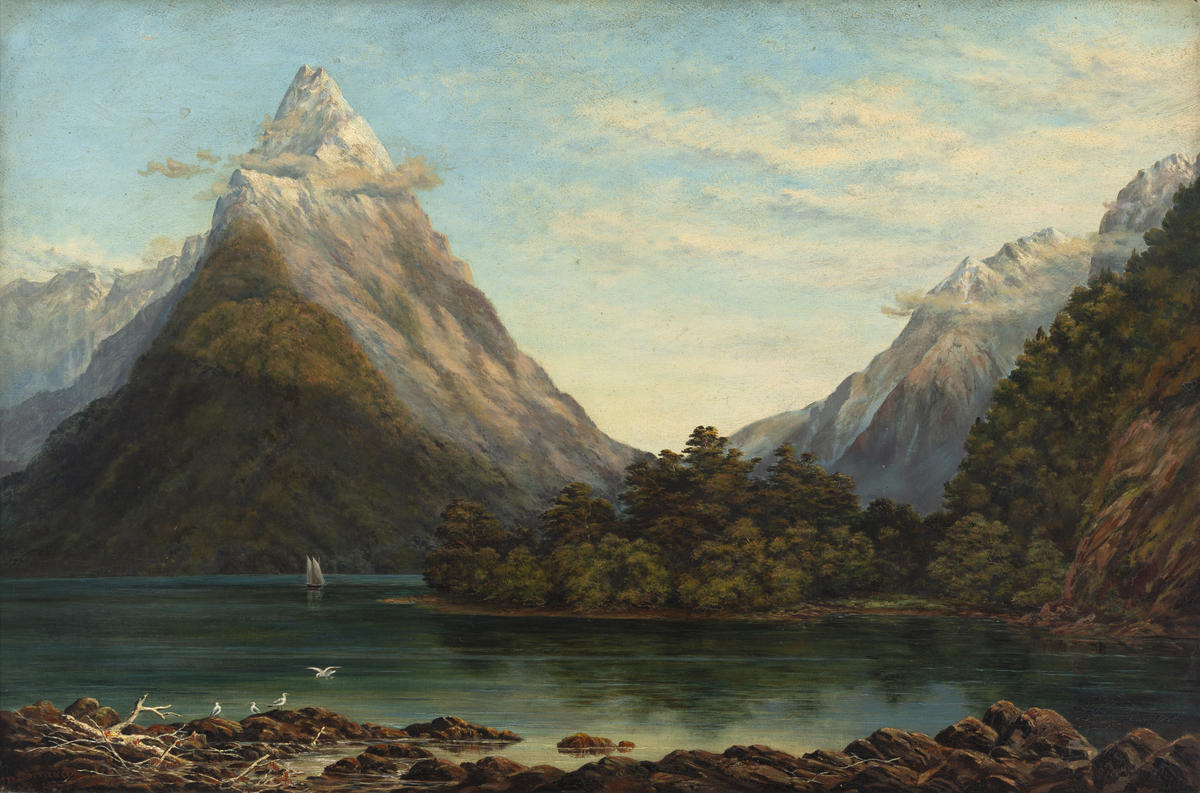
painting by Charles Decimus Barraud held by the Sarjeant Gallery

Mitre Peak is close to the shore of Milford Sound, in the Fiordland National Park in the southwestern South Island. It rises to 1,690 metres (5,560 ft) with almost sheer drops to the water. The peak is actually a closely grouped set of five peaks, although from most easily accessible viewpoints, it appears as a single point. Milford Sound is part of Te Wahipounamu, a World Heritage Site as declared by UNESCO. The imposing setting makes the peak a favourite object for painters. A painting by Charles Decimus Barraud is held by the Sarjeant Gallery in Whanganui.

The only road access to Milford Sound is via State Highway 94.

== Climbing ==
Mitre Peak is difficult to reach and as a result ascent attempts are relatively infrequent. The first known attempt of the peak was in 1883 by Invercargill artist Samuel Mereton, and Donald Sutherland. The pair took a boat to Sinbad Bay on 6 February and camped at the head of the valley. The next day, with little equipment, no coats and one biscuit each they climbed to the crest of the Mitre Range, from where they could see Mitre Peak over 3 km away to the east. With it being too late in the day to descend, they slept where they were overnight, before the next day abandoning the attempt to avoid an approaching storm. After a difficult descent they waited for two more days in bad weather at the head of Sinbad Gully before rowing back across Milford Sound to the hotel operated by Sutherland's wife.

In 1911, Jim Dennistoun walked in to Milford Sound from Lake Te Anau over McKinnon Pass, and inquired among the track porters in the hope of finding someone to climb the peak with him. None of the porters had any climbing experience, but one of them, Joe Beaglehole (1875–1962), had read Scrambles among the Alps by noted climber Edward Whymper and was thus chosen by Dennistoun to accompany him.

During a sea voyage in the area with brother George in HMS Pioneer in 1909, Dennistoun had identified what he thought was a possible route but as he was not able to reconnoitre it he instead decided to take a route recommended by Donald Sutherland. After rowing across in a boat to the mouth of Sinbad Gully at the base of the peak they starting climbing at 07:30 on 13 March 1911. Dennistoun and Beaglehole climbed via the south east-ridge through the bush until 300 metres short of the summit Beaglehole decided it was too difficult to continue and stopped. Dennistoun continued on alone up steep, smooth slabs of granite, to reach the summit at 13:15.

Descending back down Dennistoun rejoined Beaglehole and they continued with the descent. To avoid climbing back over the Footstool, they decided to descend straight into Sinbad Gully, which meant they had to resort to using a rope to lower themselves down bluffs. They reached the valley floor in darkness, and it began to rain. With no camping equipment, they had no choice but to continue on until they reached the boat at 21:45. They then rowed back across to spend the night at the hotel operated by Elizabeth Sutherland.

Dennistoun's claim to have reached the top was disputed by Donald Sutherland, who had claimed that Mitre Peak could not be climbed. In 1914, Dennistoun's handkerchief was found in a small cairn on the top of the peak by Jack Murrell (1886–1918) and Edger Williams (1891–1983) when they completed the second ascent of the peak. When J.H. Christie and G. Raymond completed the third ascent in 1941 they found remains of the handkerchief, as well as two halfpennies left by Murrell and Williams.

=== Climbing routes ===
There are six routes up to Mitre Peak, and most climbers start by getting a boat to Sinbad Bay.

== See also ==
- List of mountains of New Zealand by height
