= Forbes River (New Zealand) =

Coordinates: 43°27′S 170°42′E

Location
- Country: New Zealand

Physical characteristics
- Source
  - location: Two Thumb Range
- Mouth
  - location: Havelock River

The Forbes River is a river in the Canterbury region of New Zealand. It arises in the Two Thumb Range and flows east into the Havelock River which joins the Rangitata River, which flows into the Pacific Ocean. The river was named by Julius von Haast after James David Forbes, Professor of Natural Philosophy at the University of Edinburgh in the mid 19th century.

== See also ==
- List of rivers of New Zealand
