= Adolphe d'Archiac =

French geologist and paleontologist

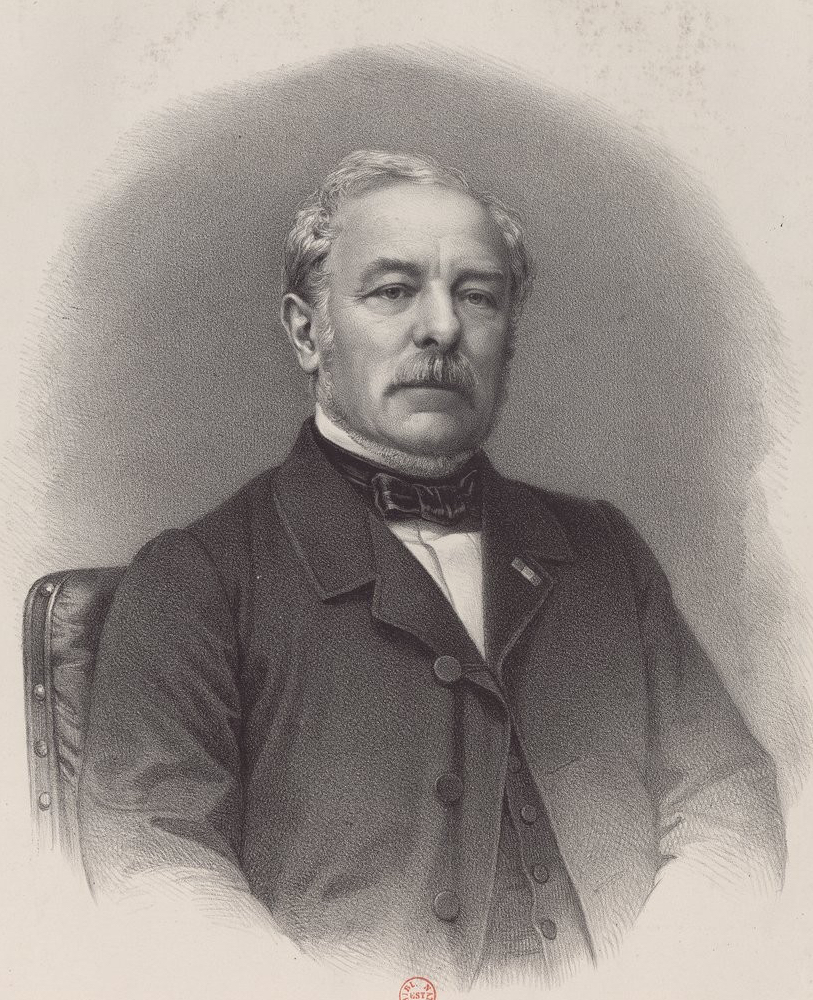
Adolphe d'Archiac

Étienne Jules Adolphe Desmier de Saint-Simon, Vicomte d'Archiac (24 September 1802 – 24 December 1868) was a French geologist and paleontologist.

== Early life ==
He was born at Reims and educated at the Military School of St. Cyr. He served for nine years as a cavalry officer until 1830, when he retired from the service. Prior to this he had published an historical romance (Zizim, ou les Chevaliers de Rhodes, roman historique du XVe siècle); but now geology became his primary focus. In his earlier scientific works, which date from 1835, he described the Tertiary and Cretaceous formations of France, Belgium and England, and dealt especially with the distribution of fossils geographically and in sequence. Later on he investigated the Carboniferous, Devonian and Silurian formations.

== Magnum opus ==
His best work was "Histoire des progrès de la géologie de 1834 à 1859", published in eight volumes (1847–1860). In 1853 the Wollaston Medal of the Geological Society of London was awarded to him. In the same year, with Jules Haime (1824–1856), he published a monograph on the Nummulitic formation of India. In 1857 he was elected a member of the French Academy of Sciences, and in 1861 he was appointed professor of paleontology in the Muséum National d'Histoire Naturelle in Paris. His better known later works include "Paléontologie stratigraphique", in three volumes (1864–1865); "Géologie et paléontologie" (1866); and his paleontological contributions to de Tchihatcheff's "Asie mineure" (1866).

== Death ==
While suffering from severe depression he committed suicide by throwing himself into the River Seine on Christmas Eve, 1868.

== See also ==
- Mount D'Archiac, a mountain in New Zealand named after him.
