= Mount D'Archiac =

Mountain in New Zealand

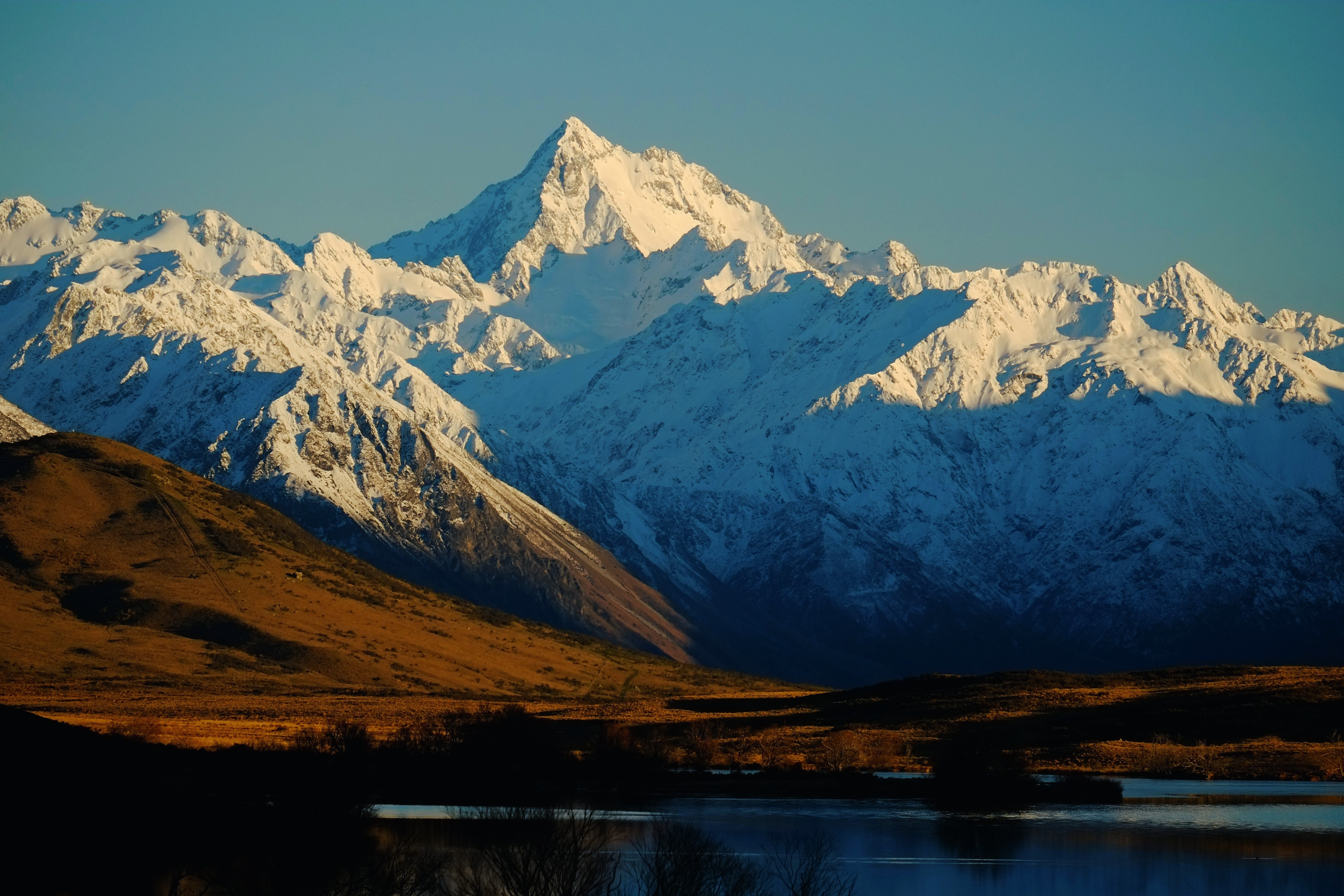
- Southeast aspect, viewed from Lake Clearwater

Highest point
- Elevation: 2,875 m (9,432 ft)
- Prominence: 1,153 m (3,783 ft)
- Isolation: 20.11 km (12.50 mi)
- Listing: Highest mountains of New Zealand
- Coordinates: 43°27′54″S 170°34′54″E

Naming
- Etymology: Vicomte d'Archiac
- Native name: Kāhuikaupeka (Māori)

Geography
- Location within New Zealand
- Interactive map of Mount D'Archiac
- Location: South Island
- Country: New Zealand
- Region: Canterbury
- Protected area: Aoraki / Mount Cook National Park
- Parent range: Southern Alps; Two Thumb Range
- Topo map(s): NZMS260 I35; Topo50 BX17

Geology
- Rock age: Carboniferous-Cretaceous
- Rock type: Greywacke

Climbing
- First ascent: 1910
- Easiest route: East Ridge

Mount D'Archiac is a 2,875-metre-elevation (9,432-foot) mountain in the Canterbury Region of New Zealand.

== Description ==
Mount D'Archiac is the highest peak in the Two Thumb Range which is a subrange of the Southern Alps. It is situated 180 kilometres (112 mi) west of the city of Christchurch and is set on the eastern boundary of Aoraki / Mount Cook National Park in the Canterbury Region of South Island. Precipitation runoff from the mountain drains east to the Havelock River and west to the Godley River. Topographic relief is significant as the summit rises 1,475 metres (4,839 feet) in two kilometres. The first ascent of the summit was made in March 1910 by Jim Dennistoun, Laurence Earle, and Jack Clarke via the East Ridge and Forbes Glacier. The nearest higher peak is Mount Annan, 20 km to the west-southwest.

== Etymology ==
The mountain was named by Julius von Haast to honour Vicomte d'Archiac (1802–1868), a French geologist and professor of palaeontology at the Paris Museum of Natural History. The Māori name for this mountain is "Kāhuikaupeka" which means "assembly of river heads" as the mountain is the source for several rivers and streams.

== Climbing ==
Climbing routes on Mount D'Archiac:

- East Ridge – First ascent 1910 by Jim Dennistoun, Laurence Earle, Jack Clarke
- North Ridge – Neville Johnson, H.J. Newberry, Ian Powell – (1934)
- Trident Glacier / West Ridge – W.H. Scott, P.F. Scully, A. Thompson, Betty Lorimer – (1935)
- FitzGerald Stream Route – Bob Unwin, Jack Stanton, Hallam Smith – (1940)
- South East Ridge – Jack Pattle, Trevor James, Bernie McClelland, Stan Conway, John Sampson – (1951)
- South West Ridge – Graeme Fyfe, Alf and Hunter Dowell, Peter Berry, Margaret Jeffereys – (1953)
- The Bandaid Route (South Face) – Bill McLeod, Peter Dickson – (1992)
- Desire (South Face) – Ben Ellis, Josh Mitchell, Jack Grinsted – (2018)
- Lust (South Face) – Sooji Clarkson, George Loomes – (2020)

== Climate ==
Based on the Köppen climate classification, Mount D'Archiac is located in a marine west coast (Cfb) climate zone, with a tundra climate at the summit. Prevailing westerly winds blow moist air from the Tasman Sea onto the mountains, where the air is forced upward by the mountains (orographic lift), causing moisture to drop in the form of rain or snow. This climate supports the Dennistoun, Trident, FitzGerald, Separation, and South Forbes glaciers on this mountain's slopes. The months of December through February offer the most favourable weather for viewing or climbing this peak.

== Gallery ==
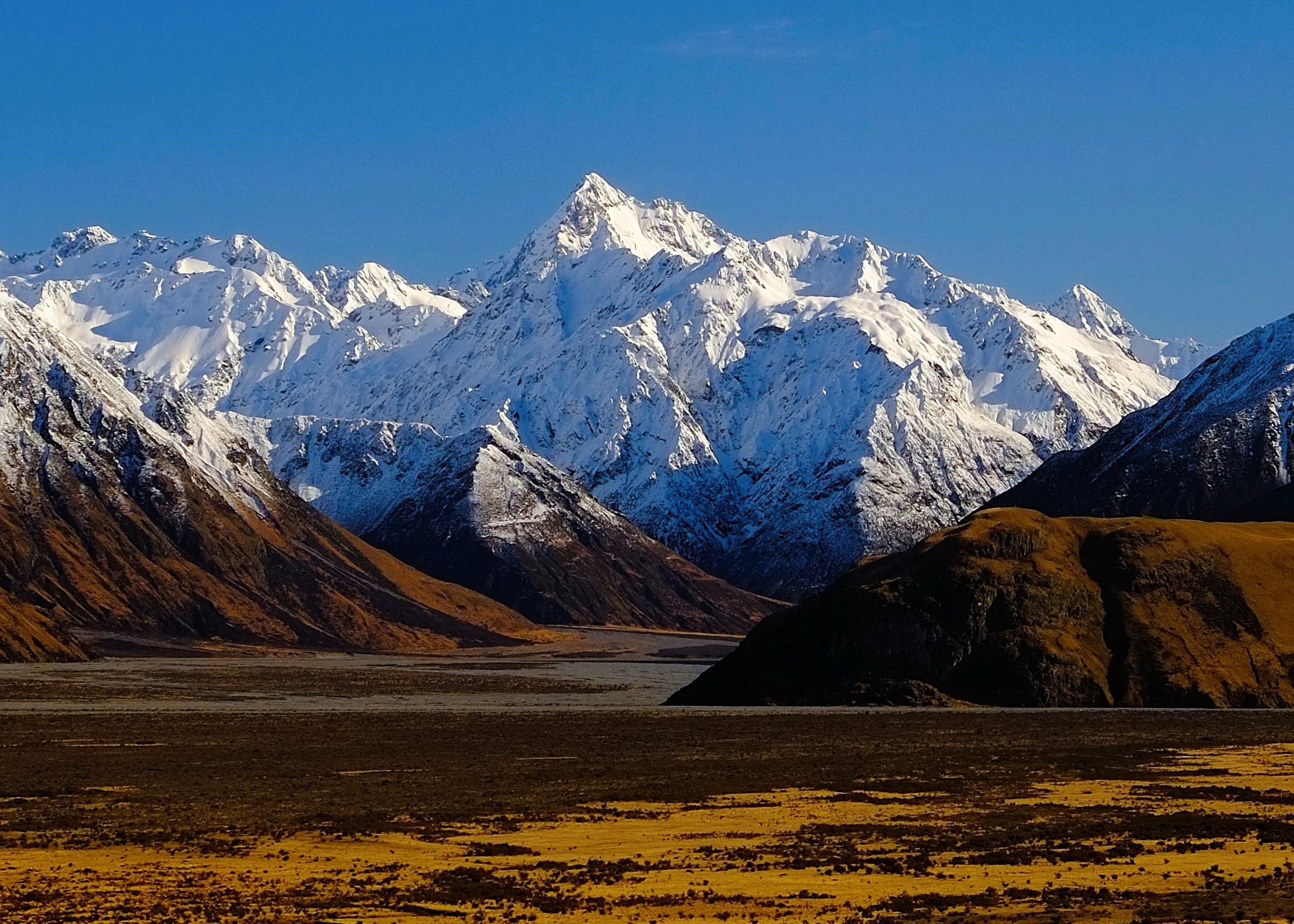
Southeast aspect

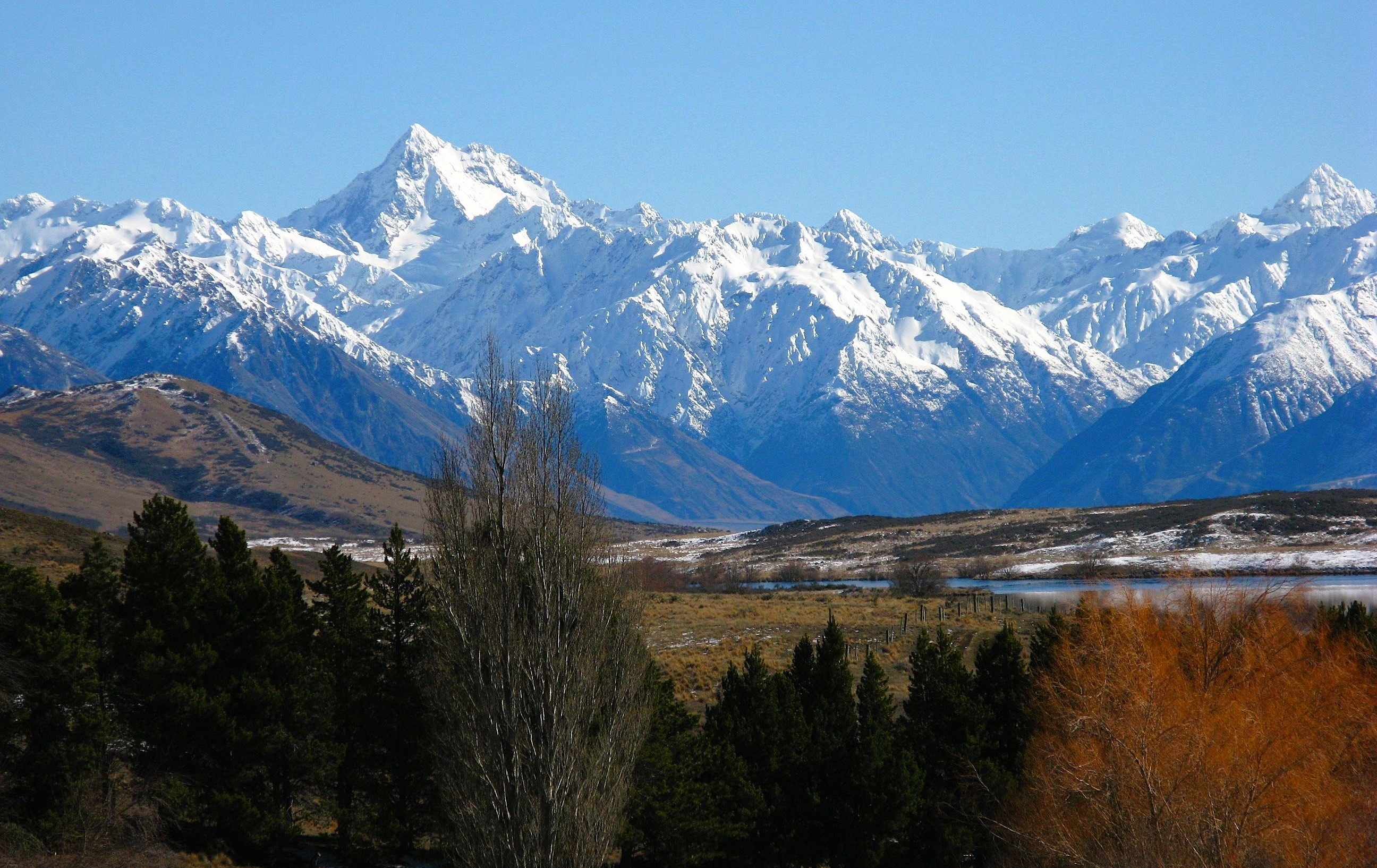
Mount D'Archiac to left, McClure Peak right edge of frame

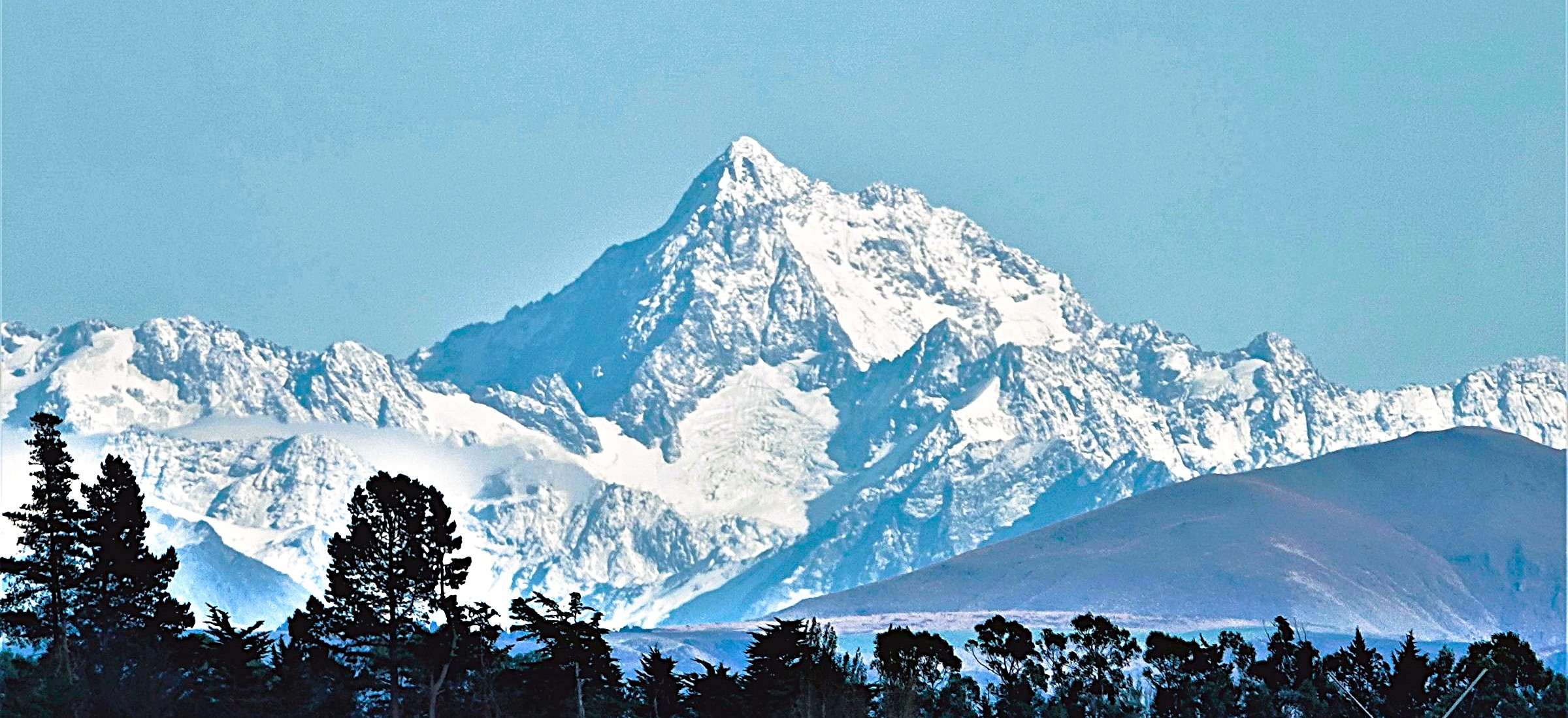

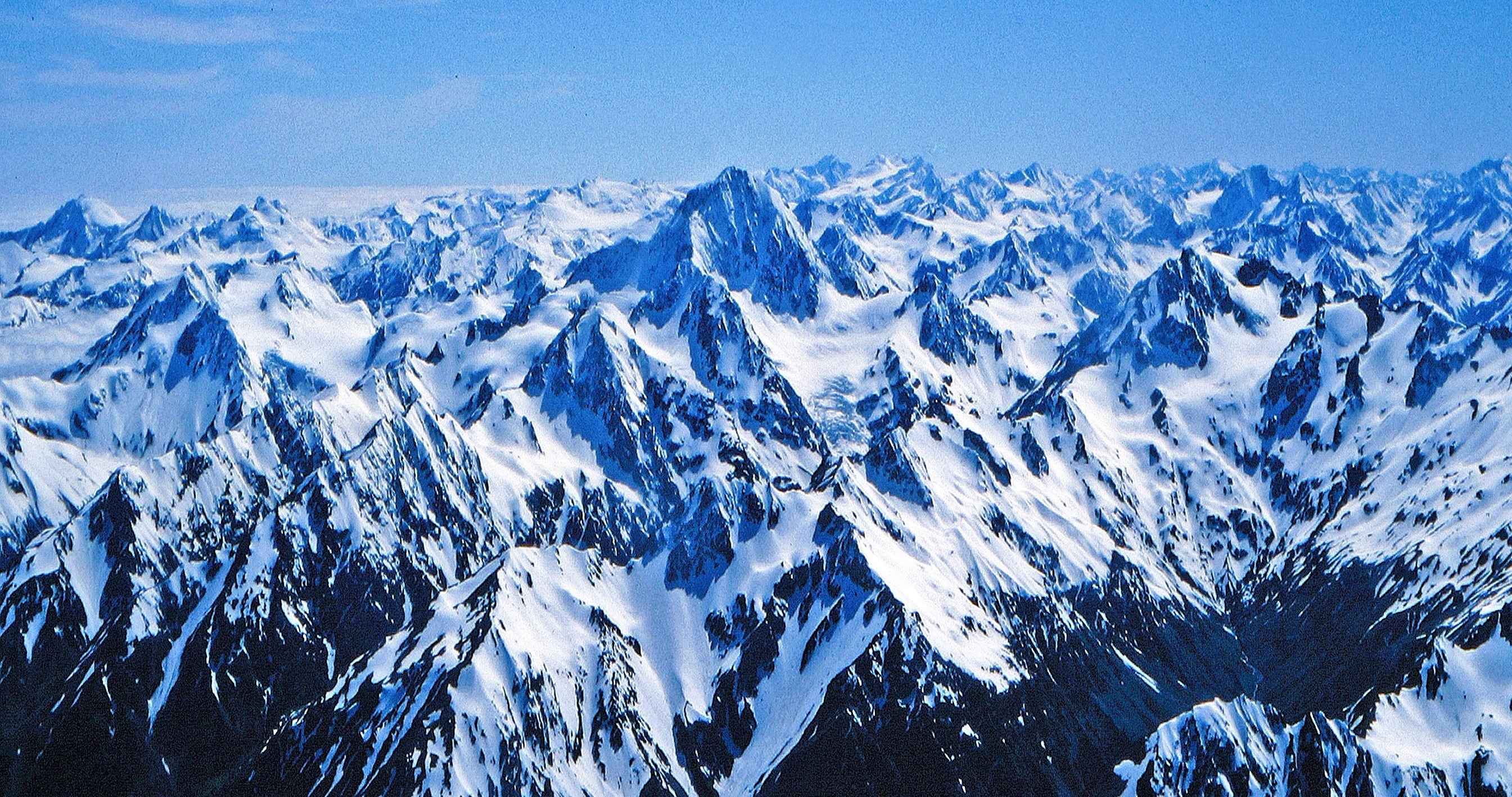
D'Archiac is the prominent peak in centre, aerial from southwest.

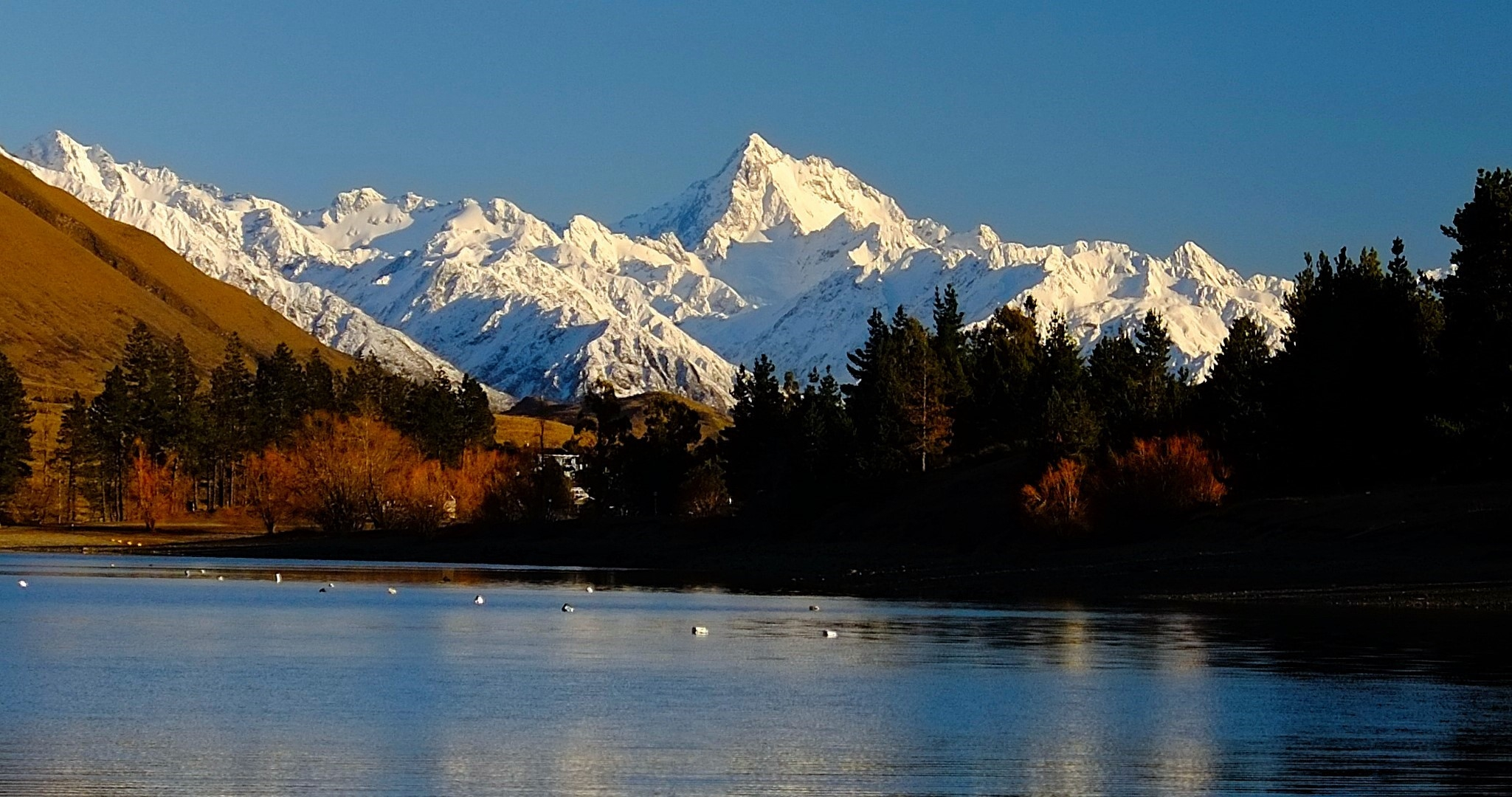
Mount D'Archiac from Lake Clearwater

== See also ==
- List of mountains of New Zealand by height
- Torlesse Composite Terrane
