= Havelock River =

Coordinates: 43°31′S 170°47′E

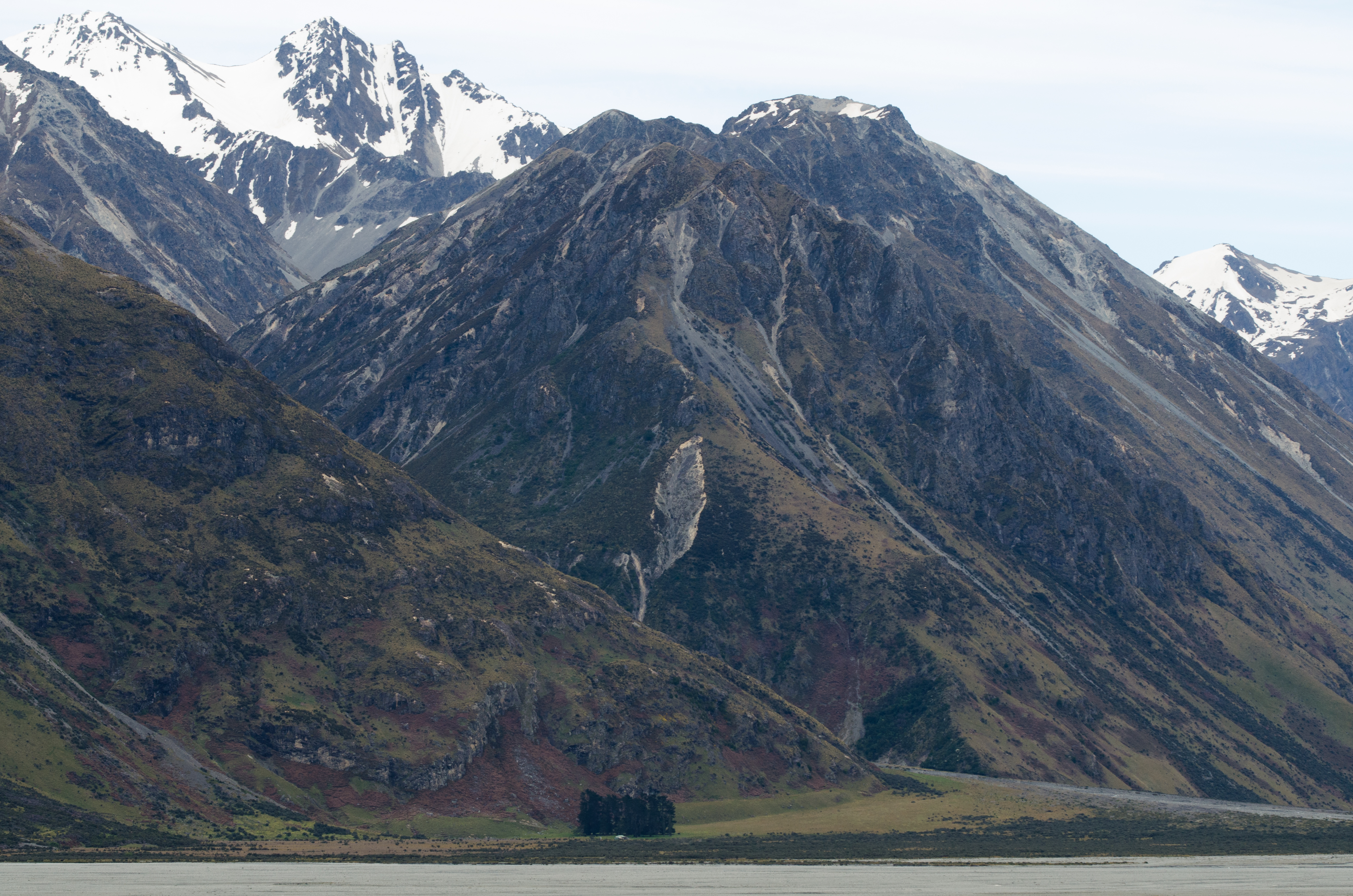

- Location of the mouth within New Zealand

Location
- Country: New Zealand

Physical characteristics
- Source
  - location: Southern Alps
- Mouth
  - location: Rangitata River

The Havelock River is a river of New Zealand. The river source is in the Cloudy Peak Range, part of the Southern Alps, between Sceptre Peak and Outram Peak. It joins the Rangitata River which flows into the Canterbury Bight between Ashburton and Temuka.

The river was named by Sir Julius von Haast on 12 March 1861 after Sir Henry Havelock, a British general.

== See also ==
- List of rivers of New Zealand
