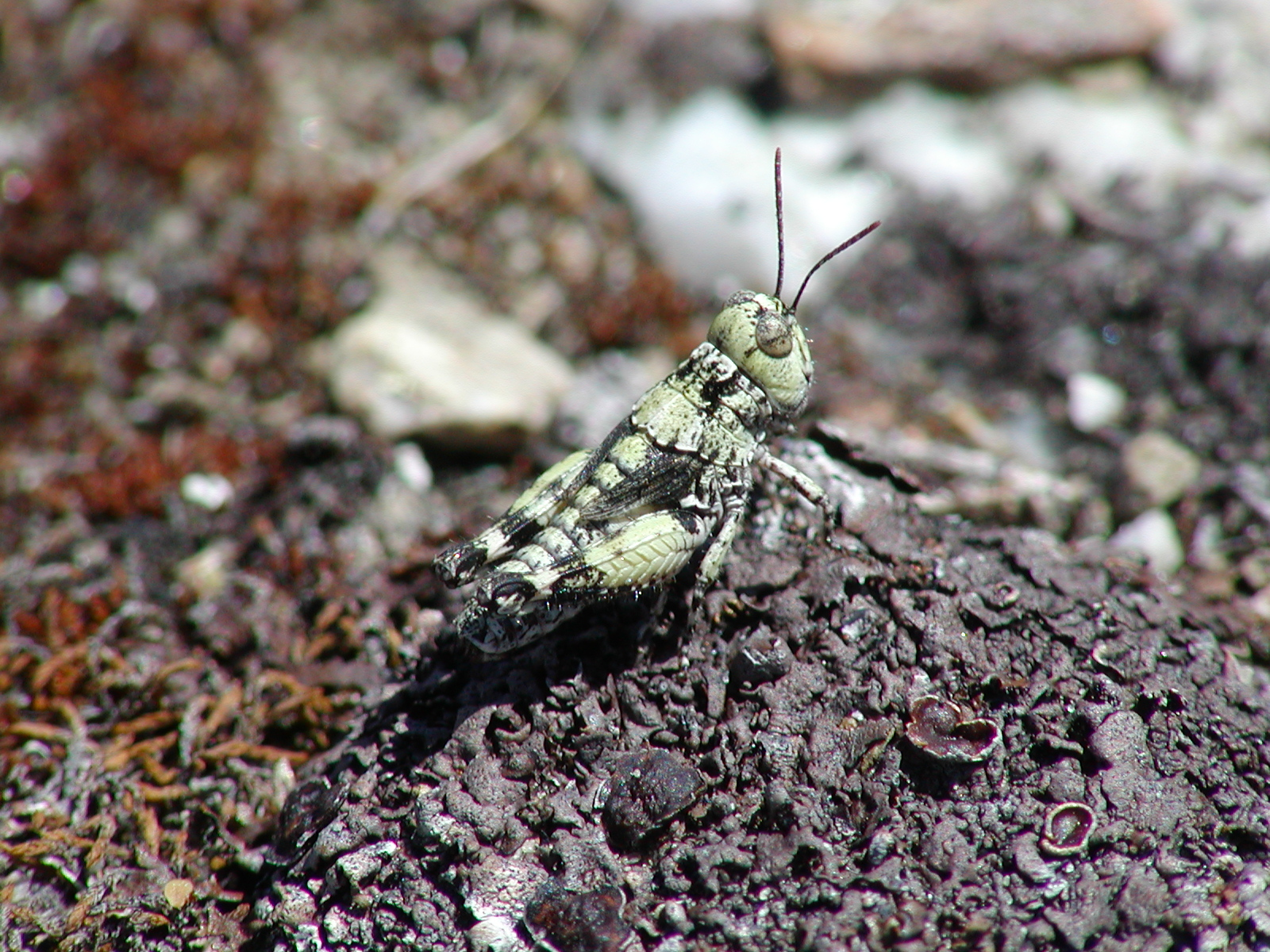

Scientific classification
- Kingdom: Animalia
- Phylum: Arthropoda
- Clade: Pancrustacea
- Class: Insecta
- Order: Orthoptera
- Suborder: Caelifera
- Family: Acrididae
- Subfamily: Catantopinae
- Tribe: Catantopini
- Genus: Phaulacridium
- Species: P. otagoense

Binomial name
- Phaulacridium otagoense Ritchie & Westerman, 1984
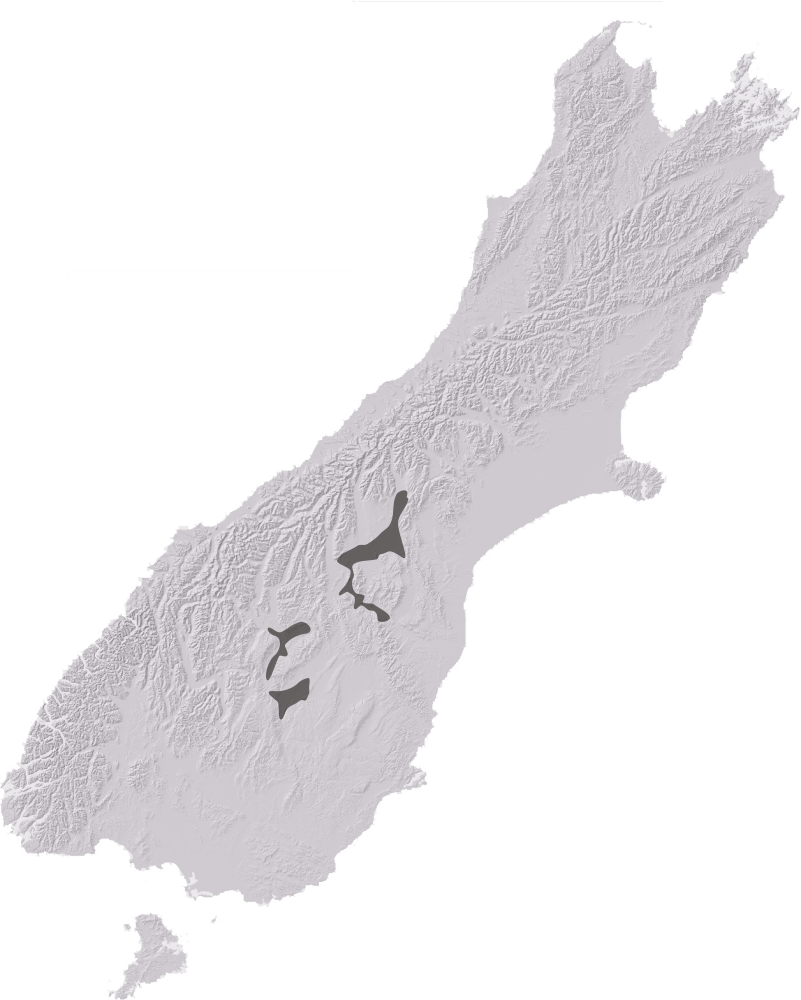
- The distribution of P. otagoense in New Zealand

= Phaulacridium otagoense =

Species of grasshopper

Phaulacridium otagoense is an endemic New Zealand grasshopper found at low elevation throughout the central South Island (Mackenzie Basin and Central Otago).

== Distribution and habitat ==
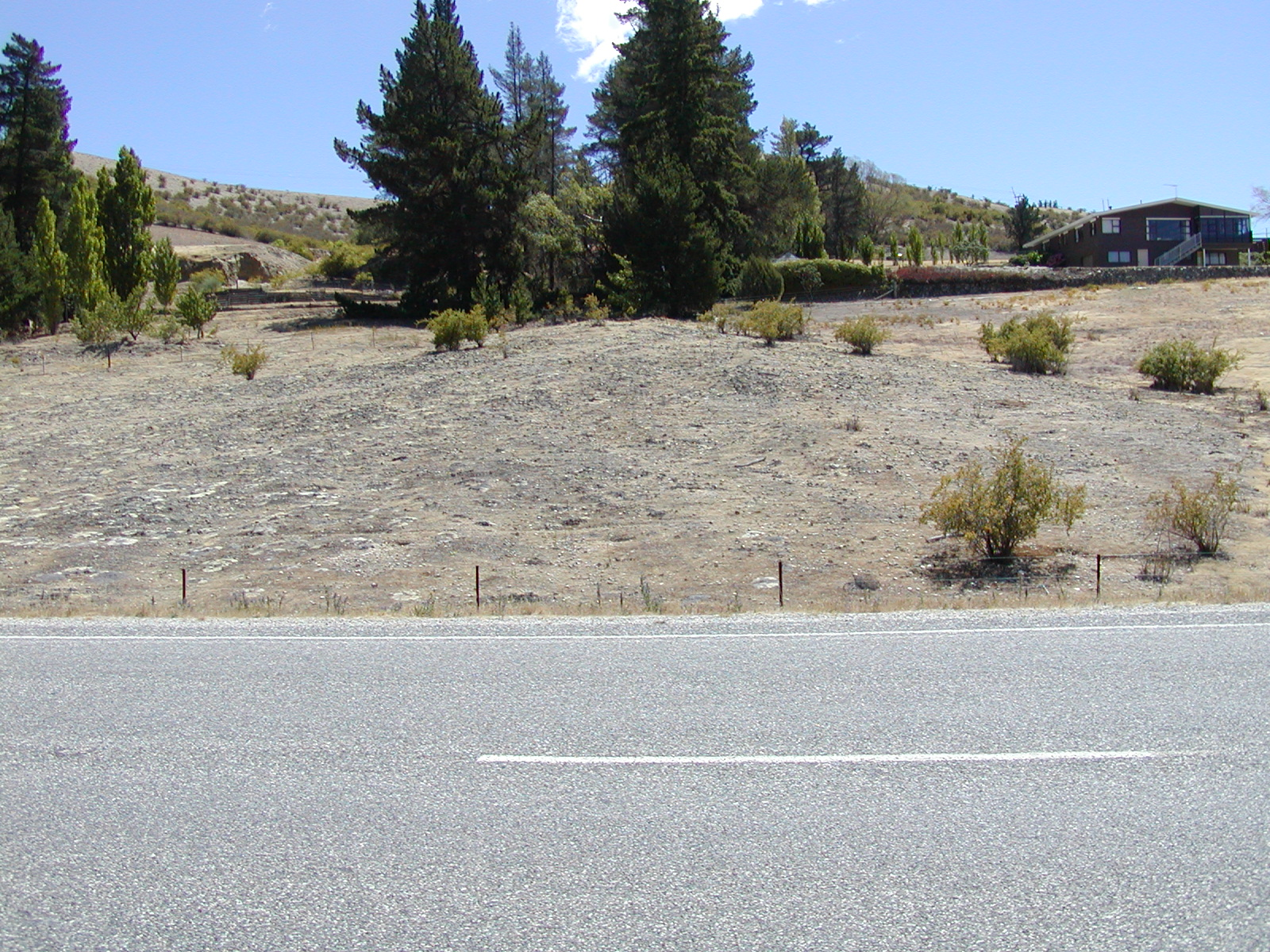
A overview of the P. otagoense habitat. Lowburn 45°00′16″S 169°12′46″E

The New Zealand P. otagoense is found on very dry slopes & riverbeds between an elevation of 140 metres (460 ft) on the Earncleugh Historic Tailings Reserve (45°14′08″S 169°21′17″E) and 1,200 metres (3,900 ft) on the Benmore Range (44°24′11″S 170°06′35″E). The most southern known location is found at Lake Roxburgh (45°28′45″S 169°19′04″E) and the most northern known location is found on the Richmond Range (43°51′35″S 170°39′00″E). The distribution of P. otagoense is being reduced by expansion and hybridization with P. marginale. Where these two grasshopper species meet populations consist of individuals with mixed phenotype, intermediate between the two parental taxa.

== Species description ==
The wings on P. otagoense are micropterous (small wings) between 1 and 2 millimetres (0.039 and 0.079 in), making this species flightless like most of New Zealand grasshoppers. However, unlike Phaulacridium marginale no fully winged adults have ever been found.

Male body length 5–10 millimetres (0.20–0.39 in); Female body length 10–15 millimetres (0.39–0.59 in).

== Type information ==
- Ritchie & Westerman, 1984: The taxonomy, distribution and origins of two species of Phaulacridium (Orthoptera: Acrididae) in the South Island of New Zealand. Biological Journal of the Linnean Society (1984) 21: 283-298. With 4 figures
- Type locality: Omarama. 44°29′06″S 169°57′21″E.
- Type specimen: Male; 9 Jan 1974; M. Westerman; Holotype is deposited in the Canterbury Museum, Christchurch.
- Paratypes. Are deposited in the Canterbury Museum, Christchurch, Natural History Museum, London, and Australian National Insect Collection, Canberra.
