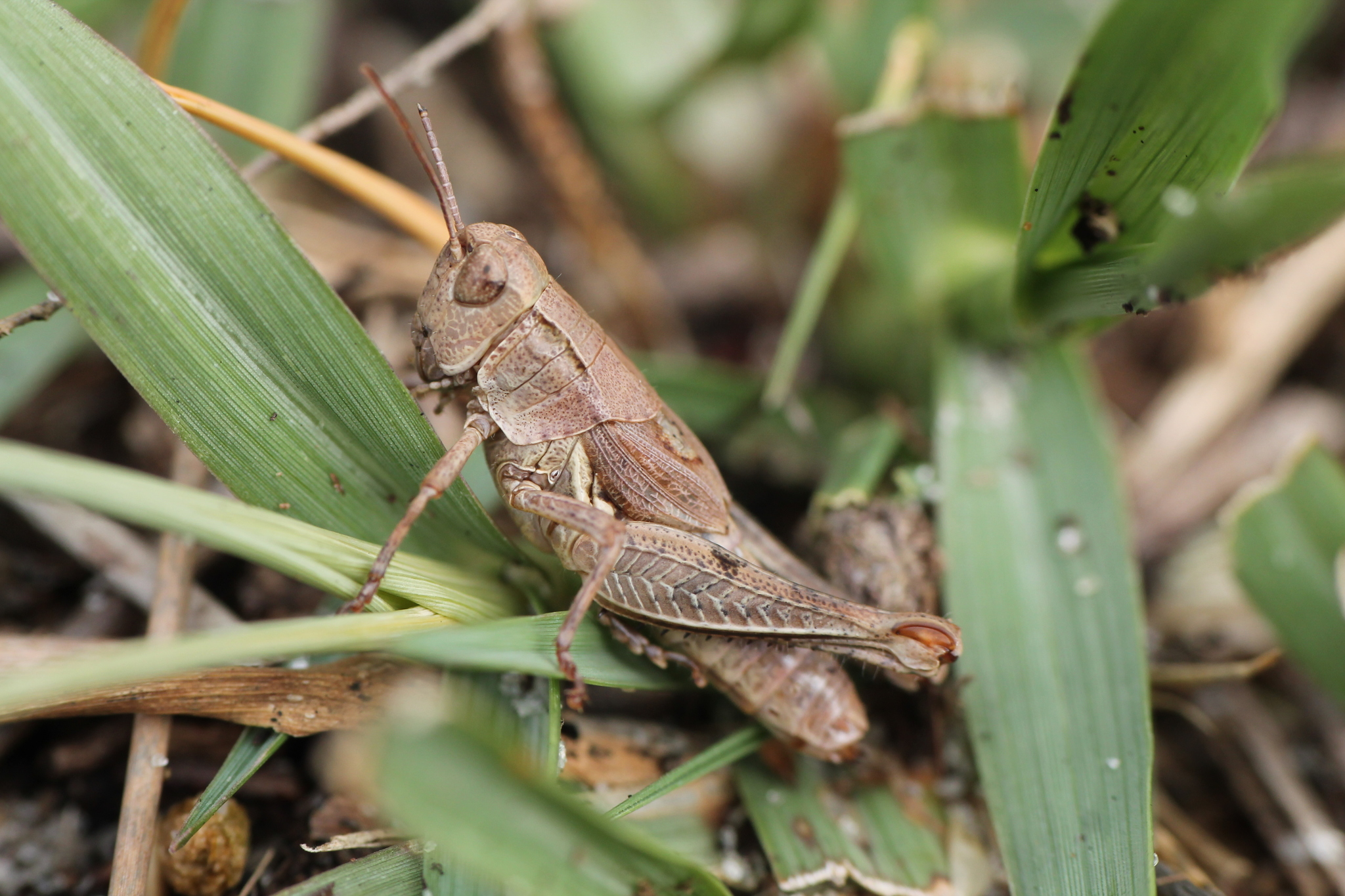

Scientific classification
- Kingdom: Animalia
- Phylum: Arthropoda
- Clade: Pancrustacea
- Class: Insecta
- Order: Orthoptera
- Suborder: Caelifera
- Family: Acrididae
- Subfamily: Catantopinae
- Tribe: Catantopini
- Genus: Phaulacridium
- Species: P. marginale

Binomial name
- Phaulacridium marginale (Walker, 1870)
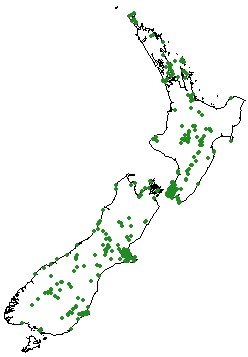
- Distribution of P. marginale throughout mainland New Zealand using iNaturalist observations (Research Grade) as of September, 2021

Synonyms
- List: Phaulacridium luteum (Hutton, 1898); Caloptenus inscitus (Walker, 1870)

= Phaulacridium marginale =

Species of grasshopper

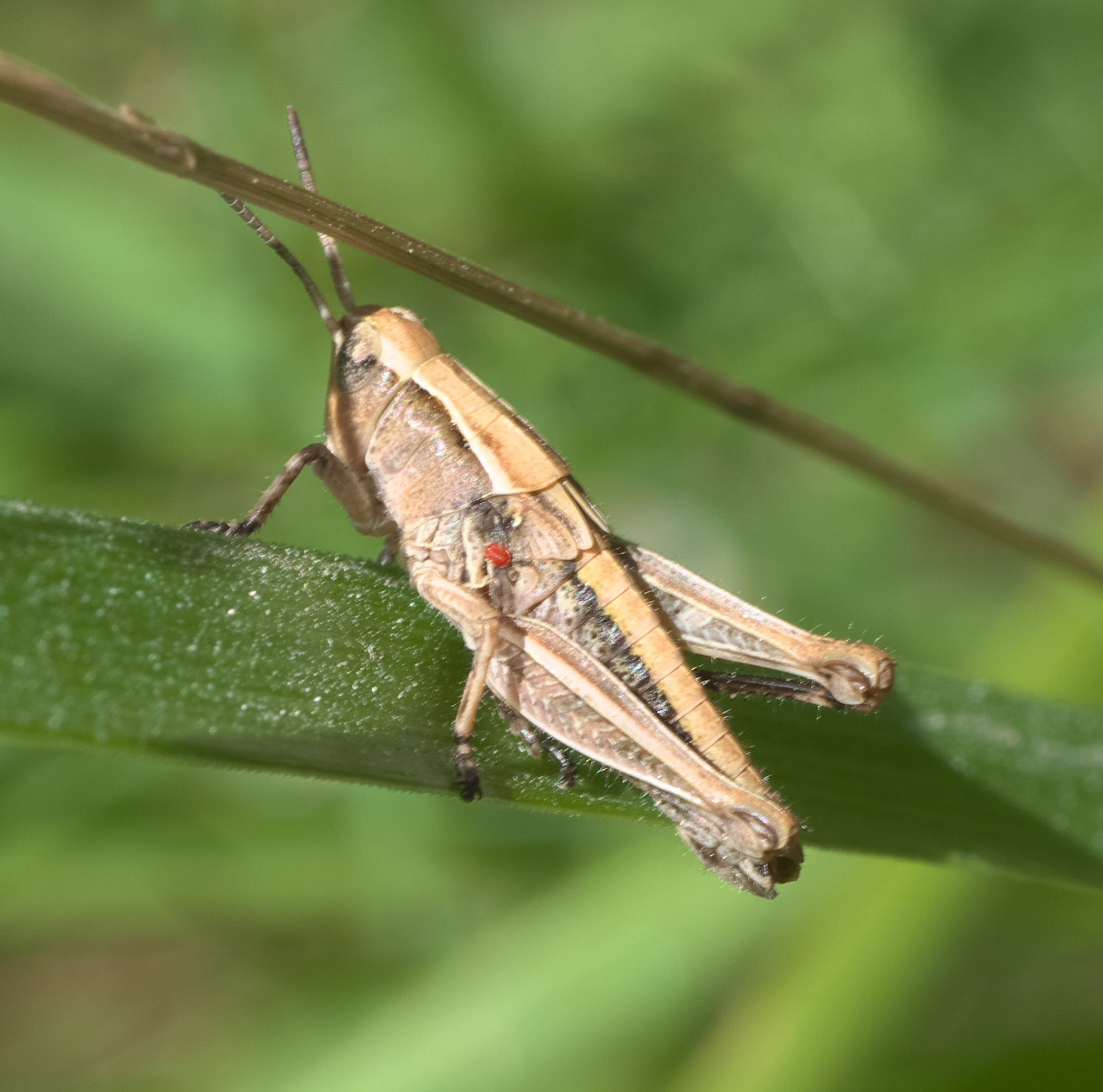
Phaulacridium marginale, New Zealand grasshopper

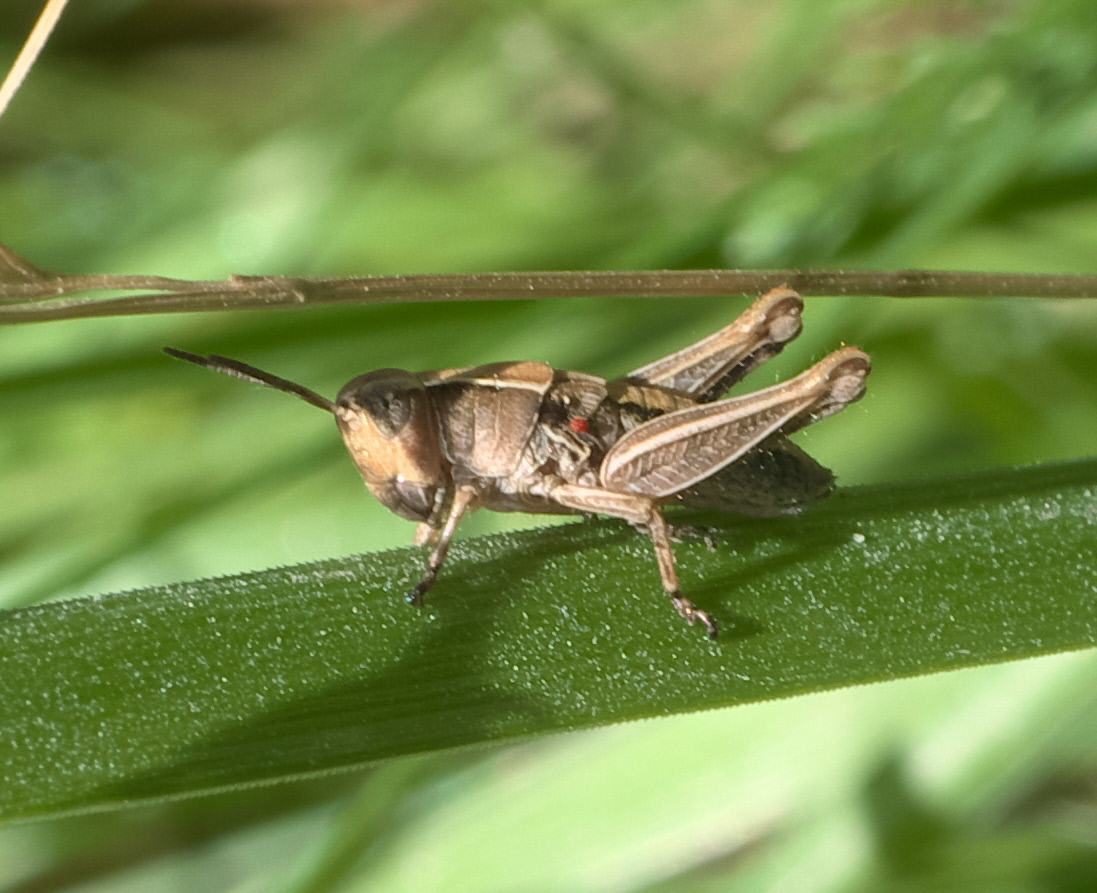
Phaulacridium marginale, New Zealand grasshopper

Phaulacridium marginale is a small species of short-horned grasshopper in the family Acrididae. It is endemic to New Zealand where it is found in low elevation open habitat throughout North Island, South Island, Stewart Island and on many smaller islands.

== Distribution and habitat ==
Phaulacridium marginale is widespread throughout New Zealand. It is commonly found on open lowland grassy flats and sand dunes. It is also found on the sub-alpine zone to an altitude of 1,350 metres (4,430 ft) on the Ragged Range (43°14′47″S 171°06′10″E). It is not uncommon on roadsides in exotic grass and in built-up areas near Wellington and Christchurch. This Phaulacridium genus prefers open spaces where they are able to thermoregulate their bodies through basking (also known as sunning).

This common lowland short-horned grasshopper species is also present on many of New Zealand's offshore islands. It has been reported on Little Barrier Island (Hauturu), Great Barrier Island (Aotea), and the Hen and Chicken Islands (is also likely to be on other offshore islands). It has even been found on the Chatham Islands, approximately 850 km east of New Zealand.

== Species description ==
=== Morphology ===
The wings on Phaulacridium marginale are micropterous (small wings) between 1–3 millimetres (0.039–0.118 in) making this species flightless like most of New Zealand grasshoppers. However, fully winged adults (89% adults female and 11% adults male) are extremely rare and can be found throughout New Zealand. The obvious benefits of having macropterous wings is to increase survivability by escaping adverse local conditions, colonizing new areas and a more effective way to escape predators. It is not clear what causes the micropterous P. marginale to produce fully developed wings in New Zealand. A possible trigger for this could be if individuals are put under a large amount of stress from harmful local conditions during the final instar.

Male body length 10–15 millimetres (0.39–0.59 in); Female body length 20–30 millimetres (0.79–1.18 in).

Phaulacridium marginale exhibits colour polymorphism with two basic patterns: striped and unstriped. Unstriped forms are commonly brown, whereas the striped form has white pigmented stripes with black edgings on the dorsal and ventral surfaces of the abdomen and pronotum. Intermediate forms have also been reported. Independent from patterned polymorphs, P.marginale also has variable body colouration ranging from brown to green tones, with green tones being less common.

Male and females are sexually dimorphic in size, with females generally being larger than males.

=== Genus ===
Phaulacridium is an Australasian genus found in Australia and New Zealand, where there are currently five known species. Two species, Phaulacridium crassum and Phaulacridium vittatum are endemic to the Australian mainland and Phaulacridium howeanum occurs only on Lord Howe Island. Of the two New Zealand species, Phaulacridium otagoense is endemic to the South Island (Mackenzie Basin and Central Otago).

Phaulacridium marginale is derived from an Australian lineage. It is thought to be reproductively isolated from Phaulacridium vittatum, who is their closest Australian relative.

== Predators and Parasites ==
Many birds and mammals eat Phaulacridium marginale. Although it has not been reported as a dominant diet component, it has been found in the gizzards of black-billed gulls (Larus bulleri), starlings (Sturnus vulgaris), Australian magpies (Gymnorhina tibicen), and New Zealand pipits (Anthus novaeseelandiae). It has also been fed to nestlings of S.vulgaris and house sparrows (Passer domesticus).

Phaulacridium marginale has also been reported in the diet of two invasive mammal species, European hedgehogs (Erinaceus europaeus) and common brushtail possums (Trichosurus vulpecula).

It has been noted that an unknown species of parasitic horsehair worm (Nematomorpha); Gordioida) was found in one collected specimen of Phaulacridium marginale.

== Conservation status ==
The conservation status of Phaulacridium marginale is "Not Threatened" under the NZTCS. However, Phaulacridium marginale is hybridizing with the very restricted species Phaulacridium otagoense where the ranges of these two species overlap.
