= Wairepo Kettleholes Conservation Area =

Conservation area in New Zealand

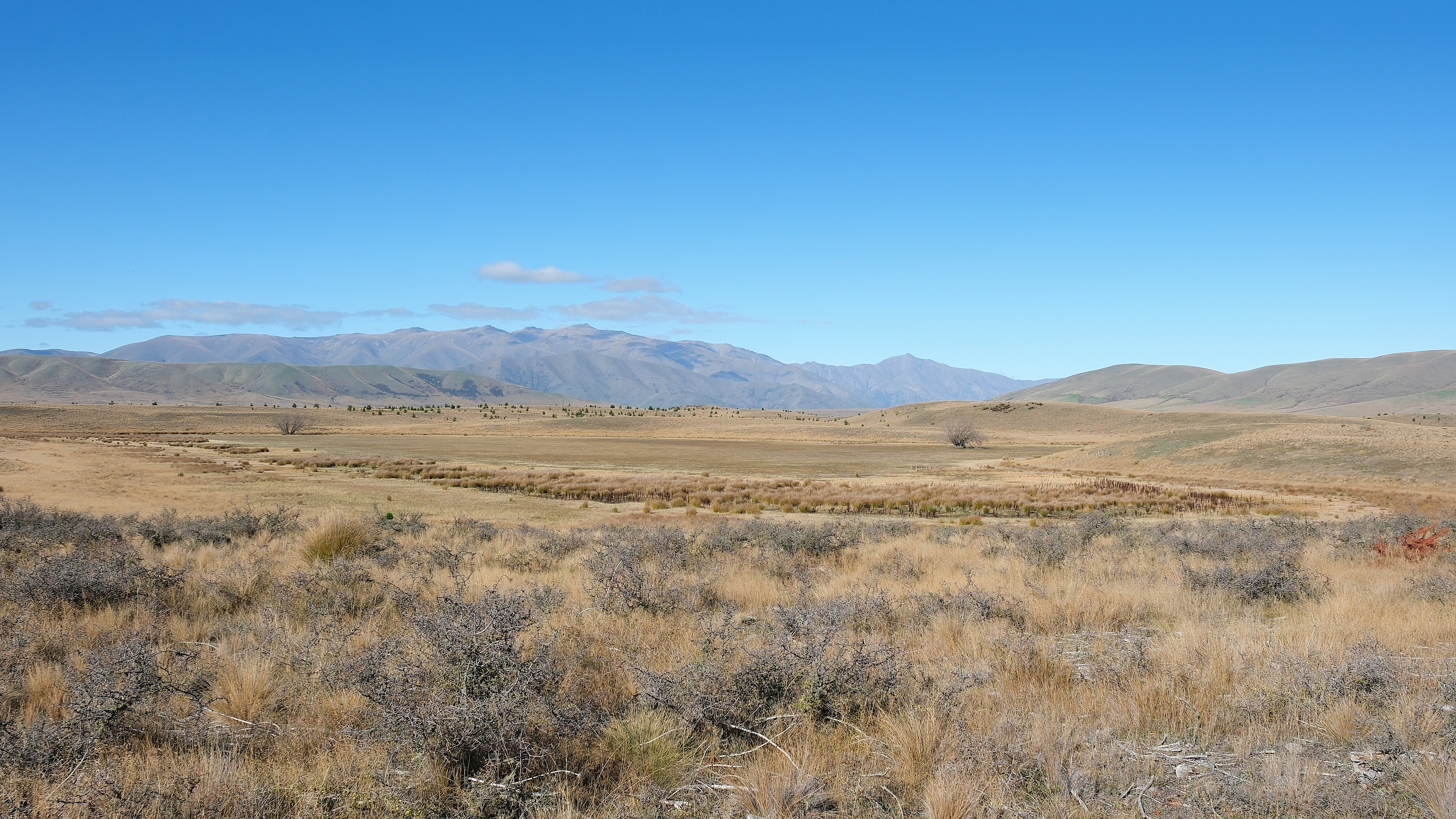
- Dried out kettlehole in autumn

- Location within New Zealand
- Location: New Zealand
- Nearest town: Twizel
- Coordinates: 44.375°S 169.89°E
- Area: 420 hectares (1,000 acres)
- Established: 2004
- Governing body: Department of Conservation

Wairepo Kettleholes Conservation Area is a protected area near Omarama, in the Waitaki District and Canterbury Region of New Zealand's South Island.

The area is managed by the New Zealand Department of Conservation.

== Geography ==
The area covers 420 hectares (1,000 acres) around the Wairepo kettleholes, depressions formed and remaining after the most recent retreat of glaciers in the area. The kettleholes form ephemeral small lakes and a wetland area after sufficient precipitation and are surrounded by drought-tolerant low growing vegetation typical of the Mackenzie Basin.

== History ==
The conservation area was established in 2004 when Glen Eyrie Downs Station completed a tenure review process.
