= Omarama Clay Cliffs =

Tourist attraction in New Zealand

Coordinates: 44°29′20″S 169°52′00″E

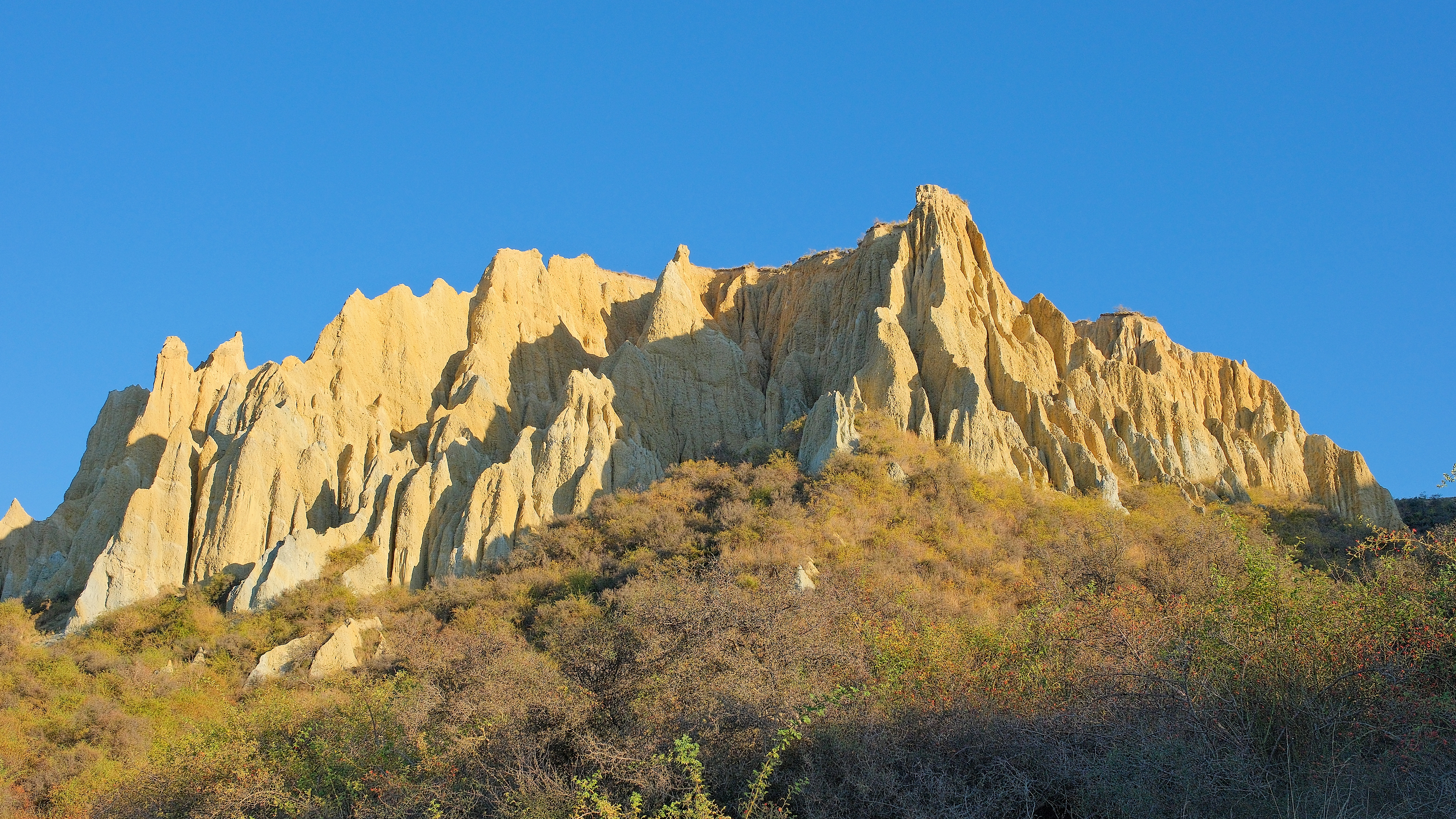
Omarama Clay Cliffs

The Omarama Clay Cliffs, also known as the Ahuriri River Clay Cliffs and the Clay Cliffs Paritea are a group of cliffs in southern New Zealand. They are located close to the north bank of the Ahuriri River, some 10 km to the west of the township of Omarama.

The cliffs serve as a tourist attraction in the area and they are privately owned. There is a fee to park.

== Formation ==
The cliffs are made up of layers of silt and gravel that were formed during glacial erosion around two million years ago, and are part of the Hawkdun Group of sediments. The cliffs were uplifted by the nearby Ostler Fault.
