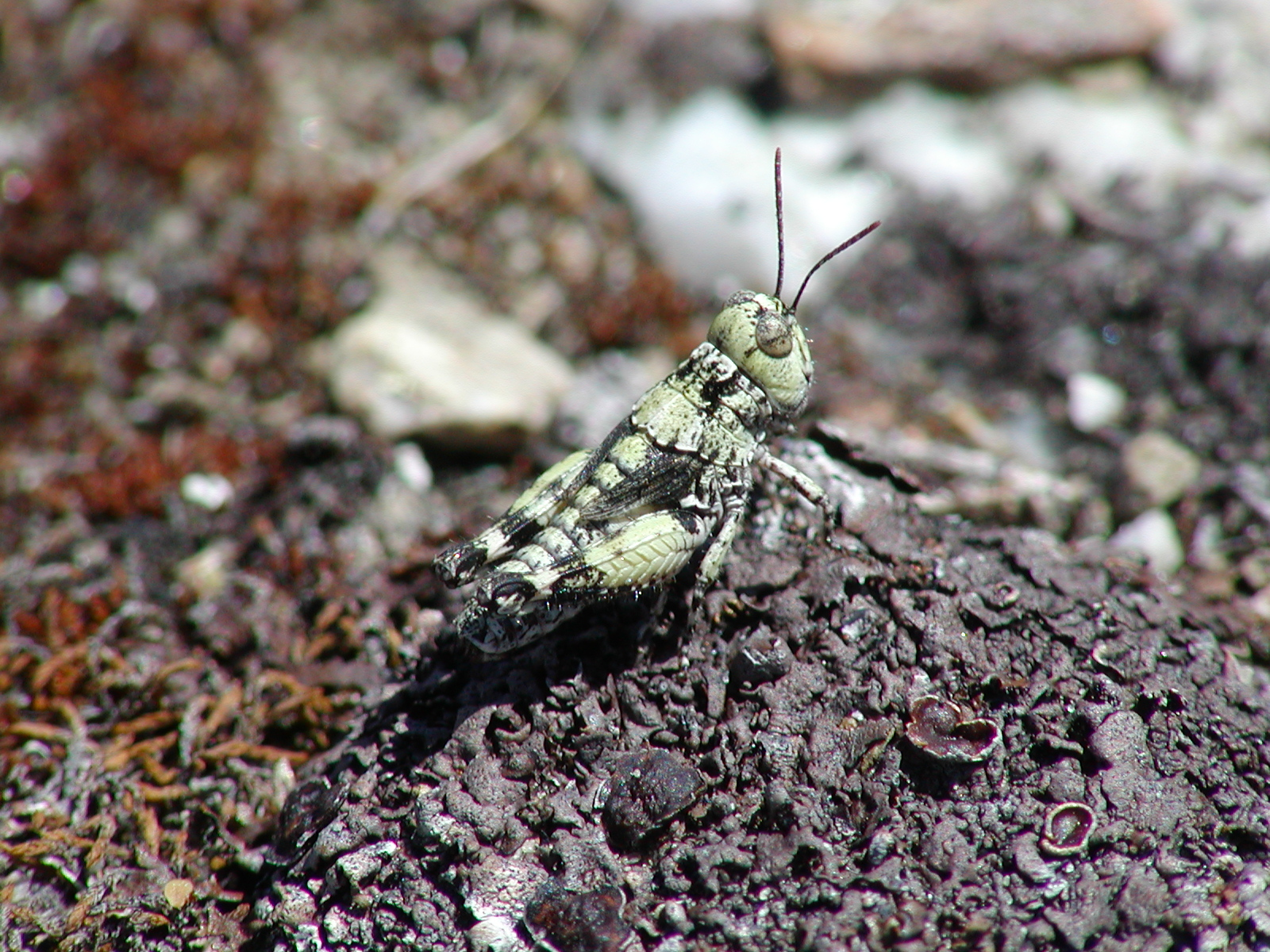
- Phaulacridium otagoense

Scientific classification
- Kingdom: Animalia
- Phylum: Arthropoda
- Clade: Pancrustacea
- Class: Insecta
- Order: Orthoptera
- Suborder: Caelifera
- Superfamily: Acridoidea
- Family: Acrididae
- Subfamily: Catantopinae
- Tribe: Catantopini
- Genus: Phaulacridium; Brunner von Wattenwyl, 1893

Synonyms
- Biformalia Sjöstedt, 1920

= Phaulacridium =

Genus of grasshoppers

Phaulacridium is a genus of grasshoppers in the tribe Catantopini from Australia and New Zealand. These short-horned grasshoppers have a single generation each year

== Species ==
There are five known species of Phaulacridium:

- Phaulacridium crassum
- Phaulacridium howeanum
- Phaulacridium marginale - type species (as Caloptenus marginalis Walker)
- Phaulacridium otagoense
- Phaulacridium vittatum

Two species Phaulacridium crassum and Phaulacridium vittatum are endemic to the Australian mainland and Phaulacridium howeanum occurs only on Lord Howe Island. Phaulacridium grasshoppers require open space for thermoregulation through basking and forage in natural and modified grasslands. Females are larger than males in all five species, and size variation within Phaulacridium vittatum is associated with rainfall. Of the two New Zealand Phaulacridium grasshoppers, Phaulacridium marginale is commonly found on sand dunes above the high-tide mark, along open grassy river flats and in the sub-alpine zone to an altitude of 1,350 metres (4,430 ft) on the Ragged Range (43°14′47″S 171°06′10″E). It is fairly common alongside roads and in disturbed habitats in North and South Island. The Australian wingless grasshopper Phaulacridium vittatum is regarded as an agricultural pest in some regions with the potential to shift in response to changing climate and land use.
