= Otago fault system =

System of geological faults in the south-east of New Zealand's South Island

Coordinates: 45.4°S 169.6°E

- Otago reverse fault province
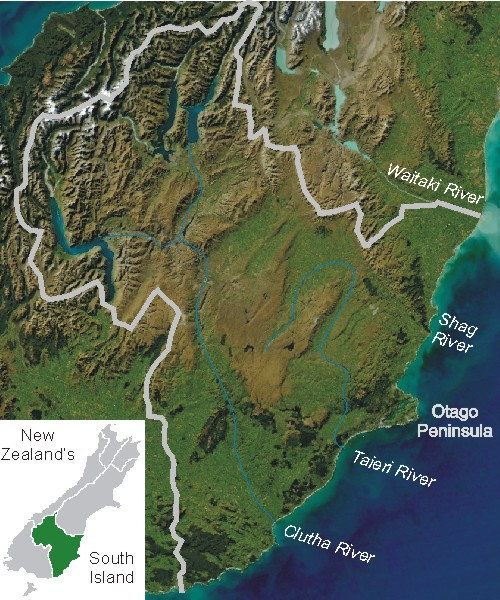
- The physical land features of Otago, in particular the orientation of the main mountain or hill ranges are related to the orentation of the Otago fault system.
- Map of approximate active surface faults (red) and potentially active faults and fault zones (pink shading) associated with Otago fault system. The Alpine Fault is also shown. Click on the map to enable mouse over of fault features.
- Etymology: Otago
- Year defined: 2000
- Country: New Zealand
- Region: Otago Region

Characteristics
- Range: M_{w} 7+
- Segments: many
- Length: 100 km (62 mi)

Tectonics
- Plate: Indo-Australian
- Status: Active
- Type: Multiple but mainly reverse
- Age: Miocene-Holocene
- Volcanic arc/belt: Dunedin volcanic group
- New Zealand geology database (includes faults)

The Otago fault system (also known as Otago reverse fault province) contains multiple faults with the potential to have rupture events greater than M_{w} 7 in magnitude. These are parallel to, and to the east of the Alpine Fault in the south eastern part of the South Island of New Zealand. It accommodates about 2 mm (0.079 in)/year of contraction.

== Geography ==
East of the Southern Alps, Central Otago has a number of parallel, northeast trending ranges separating broad, flat-bottomed valleys which extend to the coast of Otago. These ranges are associated with the main reverse faults of the system. Near the Southern Alps the faults with this north-east trend continue through Lindis Pass into South Canterbury and so the Dalrachney/Lindis Pass Fault and the Ostler Fault Zone in South Canterbury are geologically related to the Otago fault system. Otago, towards the coast, is separated from South Canterbury by the Waitaki River and the south western aspect of this river valley is defined by mainly normal north-northwest striking faults such as the Hawkdun Fault, and Waihemo fault zone. The south eastern part of the zone is limited by Fiordland and the Hillfoot Fault in Southland which is a reverse fault on the Otago side of the Hokonui Hills and The Catlins. Just off the coast from Dunedin towards the south are several active northeast-trending faults of the system.

== Geology ==
=== Tectonics ===
The boundary between the Australian and Pacific plates passes through the west of the South Island of New Zealand, as the very active by world standards, Alpine Fault. While this takes up a major part of the movement across these plate boundaries, a fifth of the currently 10 mm (0.39 in) /year compression element is taken up by the Otago fault system in mainly the Permian ophiolite belt and Otago schists in the Otago range and basin province. This Otago peneplain lies between the Southland Syncline and the Canterbury Plains. The consequence appears to be long periods of inactivity on individual reverse faults, perhaps 100,000 years and then multiple release events over a few thousand years before moving on to another fault system. Such episodic earthquake activity is thought to be the result of strain sharing between faults within the system. There is now good evidence for this.

=== Activity ===
The most recent active faults moving from the north east towards the south are the Ostler Fault Zone and Lewis Pass faults, although these are mainly in Canterbury, the NW Cardrona Fault (and its northern continuation of the Hunter Valley Fault and southern continuation as the Nevis and West Nokomai faults. At the coast the Settlement Fault (essentially in Southland but part of the Otago fault system) and Akatore Fault are the most recently active. The expectation over the whole fault system is a rupture every 100 to 200 years of an earthquake between magnitude 6.5 to 7. Because of the good evidence that some of the faults in the system can have large periods of quiescence, the information that follows should be supplemented by drill down on the map on this page or referral to original references as not all faults that may be significant can be mentioned.

Definitely active faults, in last 10,000 years of the Otago fault system
Name	Surface length	Maximum Slip rate	Reoccurrence	Notes
Akatore Fault	37 km (23 mi)	6 mm (0.24 in)/year	1700 years	
Dunstan Fault Zone	63 km (39 mi)	0.16 mm (0.0063 in)/year	7000 years	
Gimmerburn Fault Zone	42 km (26 mi)	0.4 mm (0.016 in)/year	7400 years	
Highland Fault	12 km (7.5 mi)	0.32 mm (0.013 in)/year	6500 years	
Lindis Pass Fault Zone	38 km (24 mi)	0.47 mm (0.019 in)/year	5600 years	
Livingstone Fault	6.5 km (4.0 mi)	1 mm (0.039 in)/year	6400 years	
Long Valley Fault	13 km (8.1 mi)	0.18 mm (0.0071 in)/year	7900 years	
Motatapu Fault	30 km (19 mi)	0.32 mm (0.013 in)/year	6500 years	
Nevis Fault Zone	52 km (32 mi)	0.4 mm (0.016 in)/year	9000 years	
NW Cardrona Fault	30 km (19 mi)	0.38 mm (0.015 in)/year	5500 years	
Settlement Fault	23 km (14 mi)	0.79 mm (0.031 in)/year	1800 years	
Timaru Creek Fault	13 km (8.1 mi)	0.32 mm (0.013 in)/year	6100 years	

== Akatore Fault ==
The Akatore Fault is of potential significance as it is the most active fault close to the city of Dunedin and full rupture would be associated with coastal tsunami risk. There have been two ruptures within the last 1300 years. It is unknown if the offshore Green Island Fault is related. If it is, the potential for significant human and property hazard from a whole fault rupture is considerably increased. The onland 23 km (14 mi) fault has at least a 5 km (3.1 mi) offshore extension to the south, and a 9 km (5.6 mi) offshore extension towards Dunedin's coastal suburbs. One recent rupture caused 7.4 m (24 ft) of slip. Before recent activity in the last 15,000 years it had been quiescent for over 100,000 years. The recent activity implies a slip rate of 6 mm (0.24 in)/year with recurrence average of 1700 years. The fault is named for the Akatore Creek, a small stream which flows to the Pacific Ocean south of Taieri Mouth.

== Titri Fault ==
The Titri Fault (also known as Titri fault system or Titri fault zone) passes through the western suburbs of Dunedin, often along the course of the railway line south, and is associated with the coastal hills to its east and the Titri anticline. Some believe it may extend all the way to the Water of Leith. It was originally a normal fault with displacement to the southeast over 100 million years ago. It was reactivated perhaps 40,000 years ago with reversal of movement which has formed the coastal hills in the typical northeast orientation of the Otago fault system. The last partial rupture was about 18,000 years ago and single event displacements are about 3.5 m (11 ft). The recent activity implies a slip rate of 0.15 mm (0.0059 in)/year with recurrence average of 19,000 years. The fault is named for the rural locality of Titri, close to the eastern shore of Lake Waihola.

== Kaikorai Fault ==
The Kaikorai Fault is well mapped through the western suburbs of Dunedin and some have considered it a splay of the Titri Fault. If defined as a separate fault it has not been active for at least 20,000 years. It is 16 km (9.9 mi) long and has a long term slip rate of 0.05 mm (0.0020 in)/year and a reoccurrence interval of about 22,000 years. The valley of the Kaikorai Stream runs along the fault.

== Hyde Fault ==
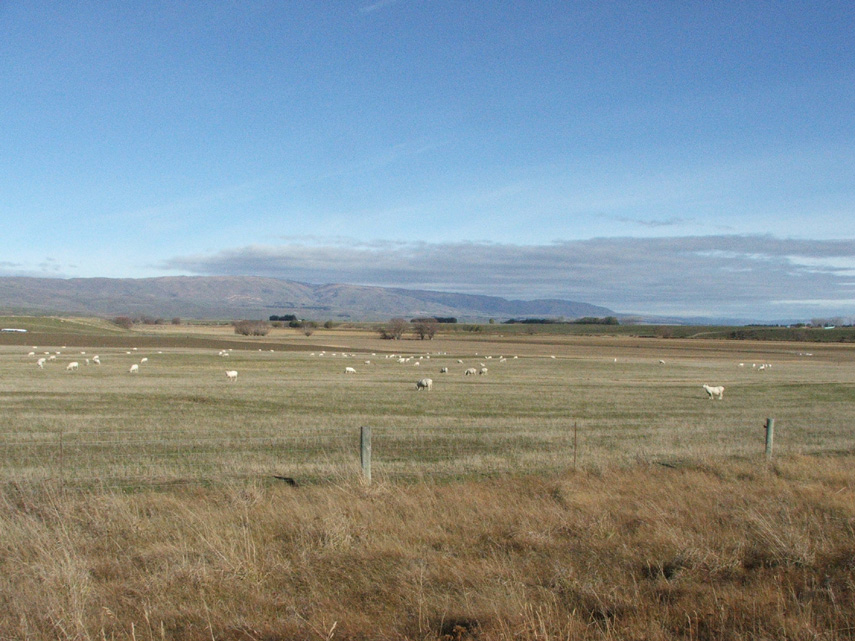
A typical fault induced ridge in Central Otago - in this case the Rock and Pillar Range

The 55 km (34 mi) long Hyde Fault is close to the small towns of Hyde and Middlemarch. The last four surface-rupturing earthquakes occurred about 47,000 years ago, 39,000 years ago, 23,000 years ago and 10,300 years ago. Movement along it has built up the Rock and Pillar Range to 1,200 m (3,900 ft) above the valley floor. Its current slip rate has been recently updated to be 0.24 mm (0.0094 in)/year.
