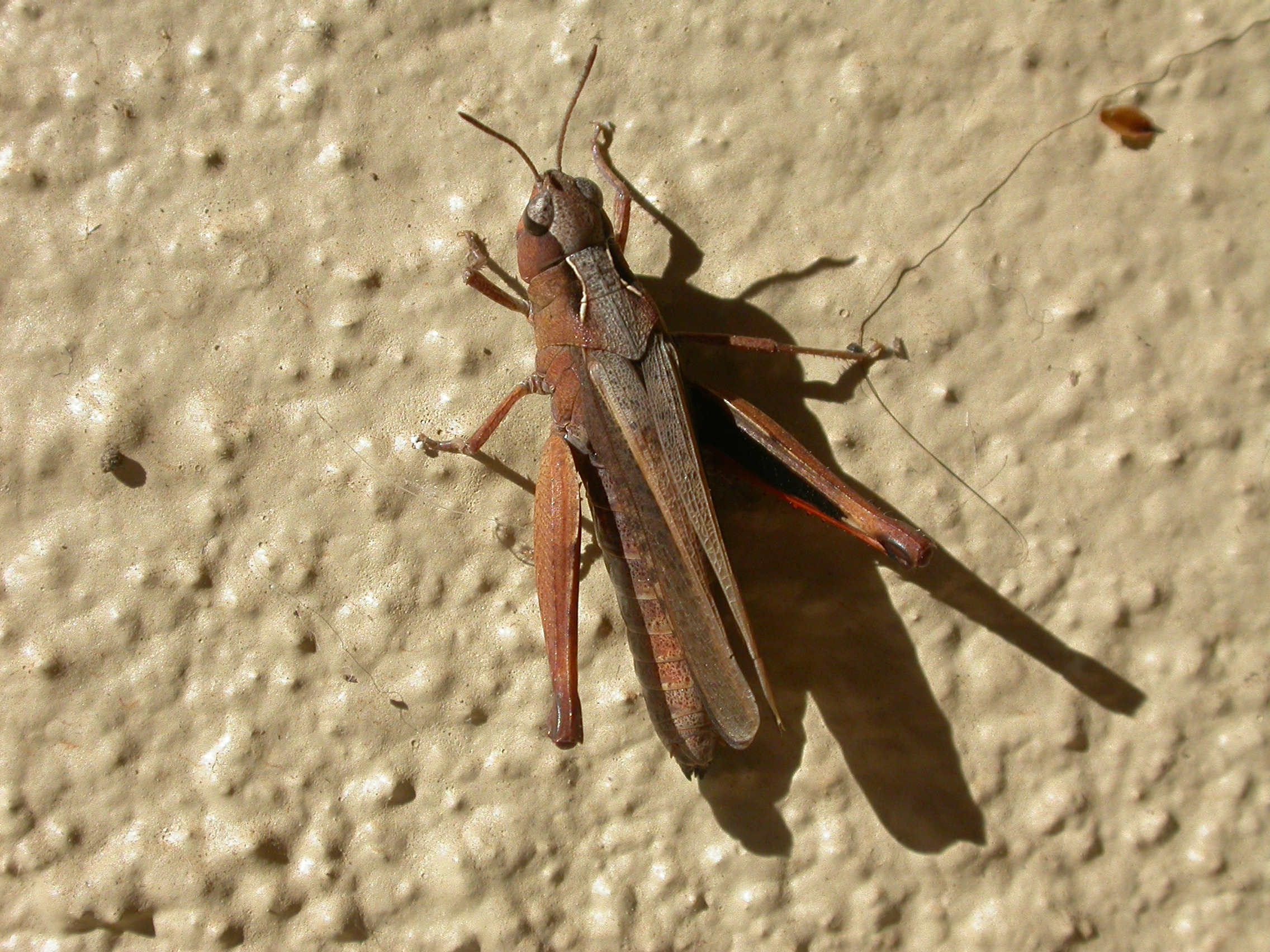
- Phaulacridium vittatum, Wingless Grasshopper, Australia

Scientific classification
- Kingdom: Animalia
- Phylum: Arthropoda
- Clade: Pancrustacea
- Class: Insecta
- Order: Orthoptera
- Suborder: Caelifera
- Family: Acrididae
- Subfamily: Catantopinae
- Tribe: Catantopini
- Genus: Phaulacridium
- Species: P. vittatum

Binomial name
- Phaulacridium vittatum (Sjöstedt, 1920)

= Phaulacridium vittatum =

Species of insect

Phaulacridium vittatum, the Wingless Grasshopper, is a species of short-horned grasshopper in the family Acrididae. It is found in Australia. Although commonly called the 'Wingless grasshopper', adults may be winged and therefore capable of flight.
