= Benmore Peak =

Benmore Peak Observatory
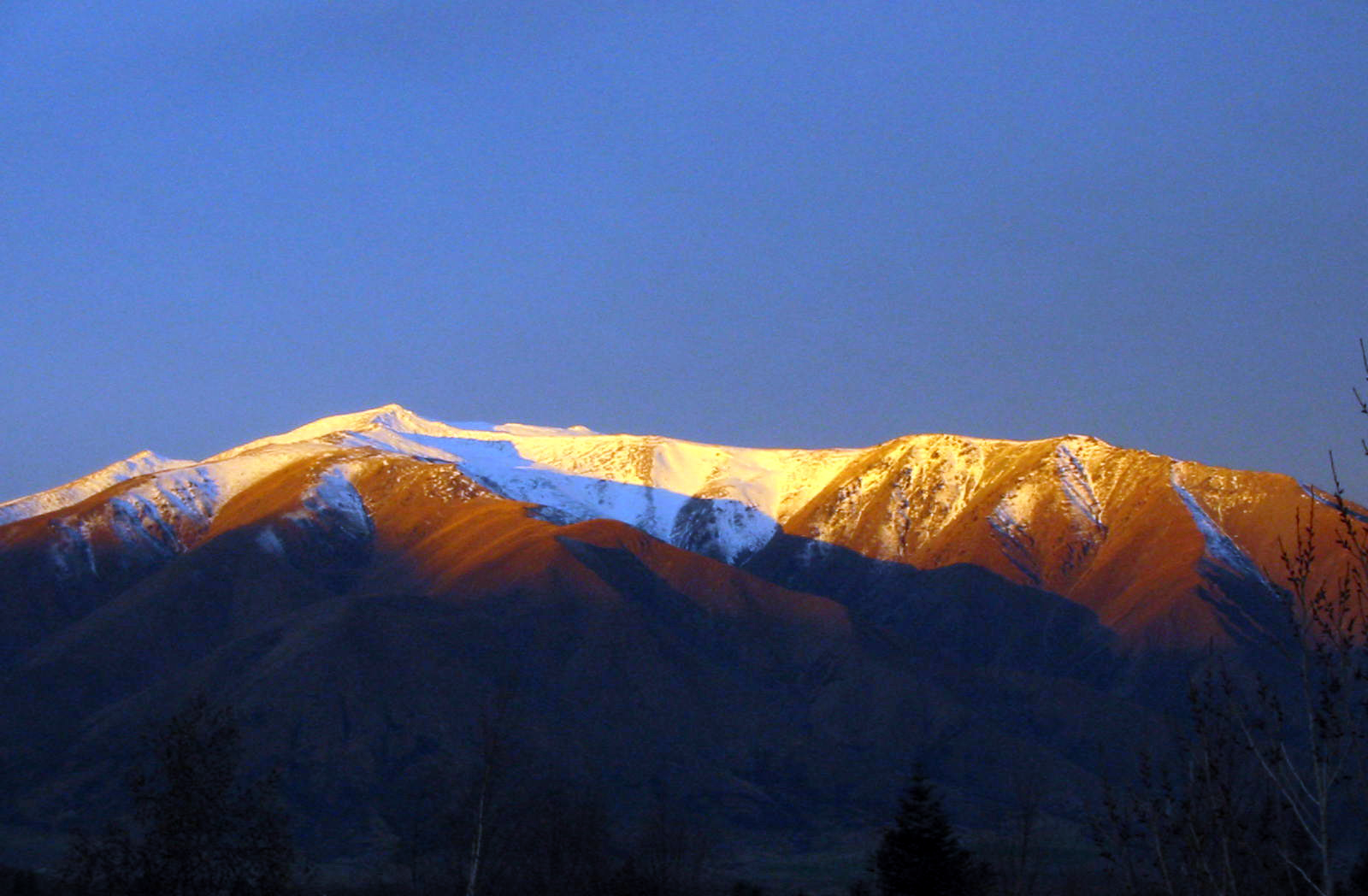
- Organization: Benmore Peak Observatory
- Location: Benmore Range, South Island, New Zealand
- Coordinates: 44.4172°S 170.0940°E
- Altitude: 1,932 m (6,339 ft)
- Established: 1996

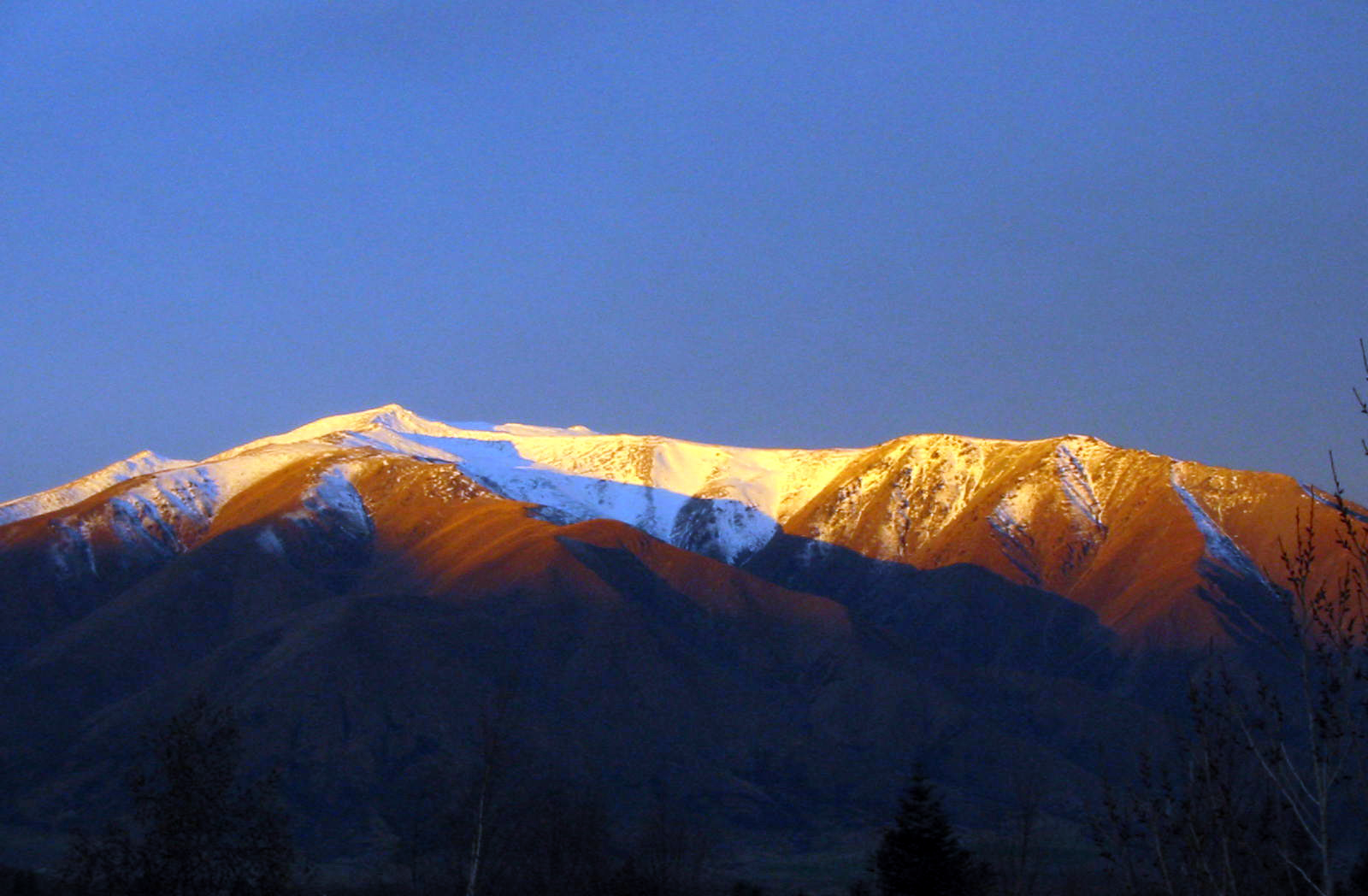
View of southwestern side of the Benmore Range, South Island, New Zealand, at sunset, from Omarama village. Benmore Peak is the highest point at left of centre.

Benmore Peak is the highest point of the Benmore Range, an island range located in the southern half of the Mackenzie Basin, South Island, New Zealand.

The 28 km (17½ mile) by 16 km (9.9 mi) Benmore Range is aligned approximately north–south and situated between the small town of Twizel at the northern end and the village of Omarama at the south-western end. The Benmore Range is bordered by Lake Benmore to the south and the Haldon Arm of Lake Benmore to the east.

There are more than thirty surveyed peaks above 1,000 m (3,280 ft), with at least twelve of these above 1,500 m (4,920 ft), although only five have official names.

Benmore Peak (1,932 m / 6,338 ft) is near the centre of the range, with Sutherlands Peak (1,846 m / 6,054 ft) and The Cairn (1,464 m / 4,801 ft) to the north and Totara Peak (1,822 m / 5,977 ft) to the south. The Buscot (1,245 m / 4,084 ft) is an attached subpeak on the western side of the main range.

The range mostly consists of greywacke and some schist. Flora includes slim snow tussock (Chionochloa macra) and narrow-leaved snow tussock (Chionochloa rigida) as well as an array of alpine herbs, while fauna include the New Zealand falcon, sky lark, chukar, California quail and the New Zealand pipit, as well as the common skink and common gecko.

Although it is almost entirely New Zealand Crown land and a protected Outstanding Landscape Area, several large farm stations have legally run stock on the Benmore Range for more than a century, including Ben Omar, Benmore, Buscot, Glenbrook, Glencairn, Peak Valley and Totara Peak.

Benmore Peak Observatory (BPO) is sited on privately owned land at the summit plateau. The facility has instruments and structures for astronomy and meteorology at the peak and down to the 1,830 m (6,002 ft) level. It is the highest altitude observatory in the Southern Hemisphere outside of Antarctica and the Andes of South America.

The NZ Department of Conservation acquired 12 km^{2} (1,200 hectares / 2,965 acres) of land between The Cairn and Sutherlands Peak from Glenbrook Station and it has been officially designated a public Conservation Area. It incorporates an area of wetlands as well as much drier elevated areas. A public walking track is accessible via an easement across Glenbrook Station.

== See also ==
- List of mountains of New Zealand by height
