= Ostler Fault Zone =

Fault zone in New Zealand

- Ostler Fault
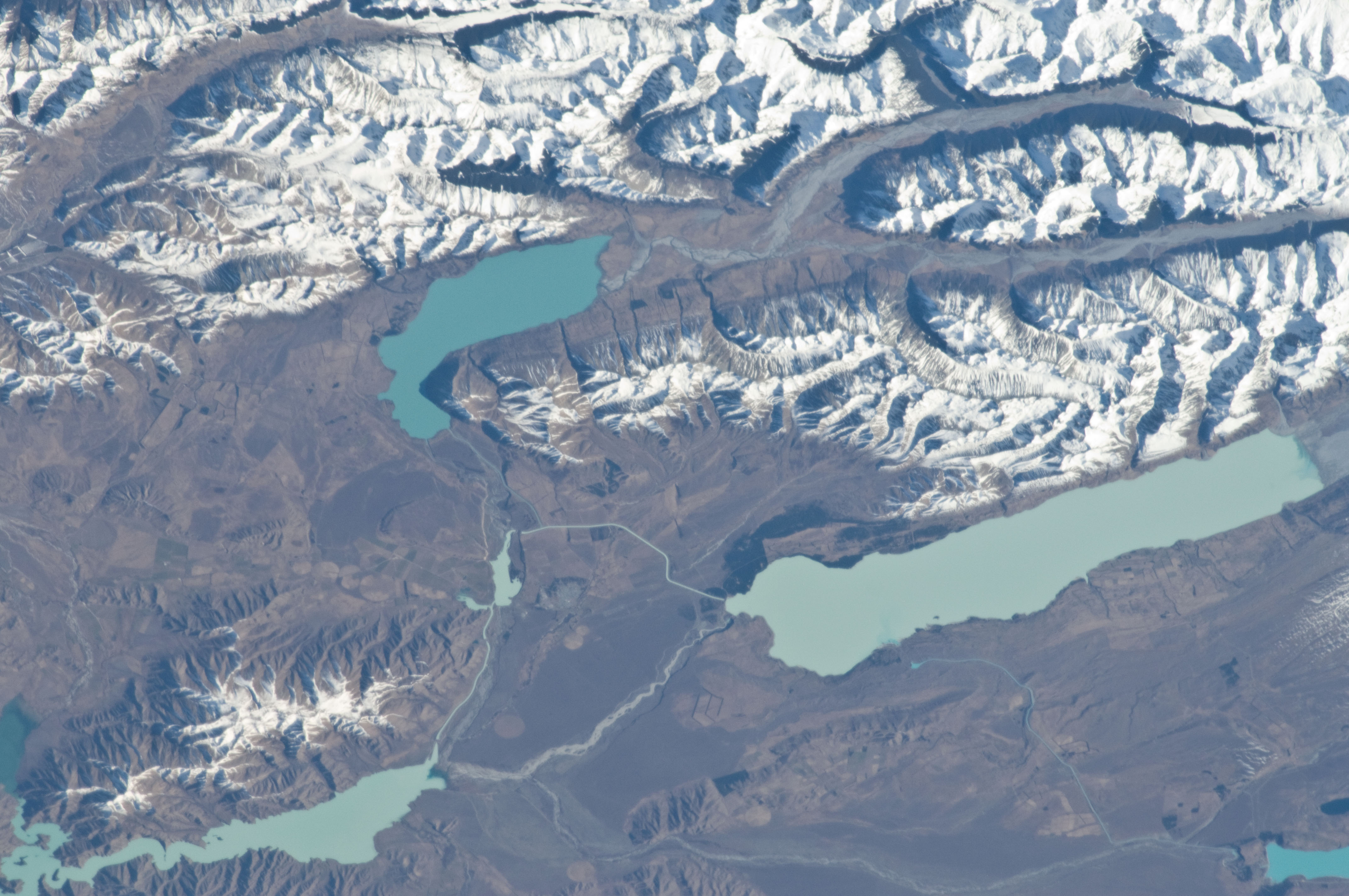
- The northern Ostler Fault Zone is along the snow line at the right of this aerial view towards the south west. It is beyond milky blue Lake Pukaki, with beyond the fault, the snow covered Ben Ohau Range. The deeper blue lake in the distance is Lake Ōhau, well beyond the fault which passes at the top of the small Lake Ruataniwha in the center of the picture. The fault continues on the western side of the brown/gray Ahuriri River valley beyond at bottom left the partially snow covered Benmore Range and milky blue Lake Benmore.
- Map with Ostler Fault Zone in violet with nearby active surface faults (red) and potentially active faults and fault zones shaded in pink. Click on the map to enable mouse over of fault features.
- Etymology: Mount Ostler
- Coordinates: 44.32°S 169.99°E
- Country: New Zealand
- Region: Canterbury Region

Characteristics
- Range: M_{w} 7.0
- Segments: many
- Length: 60 km (37 mi)

Tectonics
- Plate: Indo-Australian
- Status: Active
- Type: Reverse
- Age: Miocene-Holocene
- New Zealand geology database (includes faults)

The Ostler Fault Zone (also Ostler Fault) is an active fault zone, to the east of the Alpine Fault in the Mackenzie District of Canterbury on New Zealand's South Island. It has had multiple recent rupture events greater than M_{L} 6.5 in magnitude, with a recent 6.9 to 7.0 event, and has recently accommodated 1.9 mm (0.075 in)/year of compression and thus land contraction.

== Geography ==
East of the Southern Alps, are a number of relatively dry intermontane basins of which the most northern and largest is the Mackenzie Basin (Te Manahuna, the Mackenzie Country). This has been extensively developed for hydroelectric purposes and contains the fault zone which as a result of the risk to power generation has been extensively studied. The fault zone extends from the Ahuriri River in the south to Whale Stream at the northern end of Lake Pukaki. The northern part of the fault is on the eastern side of the Ben Ohau Range. The south western uplift from the fault continues in Table Hill to the south of the artificial Lake Ruataniwha, Cloud Hill and the Clay Cliffs of the west side of the Ahuriri River valley.

== Geology ==
=== Tectonics ===
The boundary between the Australian and Pacific plates converges obliquely at about 38 mm (1.5 in)/year in this region of the South Island of New Zealand. The right-lateral transpressional Alpine Fault along the western aspect of the South Island takes up no more than 80% of this movement. In the central-southern part of the island the remaining compression element is taken up mainly by reverse faults such as those in the Otago fault system and the Ostler Fault Zone.

=== Geological context ===
In this region of South Canterbury the basement rock is graywacke. The fault zone was originally, more than 56 million years ago, a normal fault during the Late Cretaceous to Paleocene and was reactivated as a high angle thrust reverse fault in the last 2.4 million years. The surface deformation patterns across the Ostler Fault Zone are up to about 3 km (1.9 mi) wide in the central portion and usually have highly asymmetric anticlinal folding with broad west-tilted fold backlimbs abruptly transitioning to relatively steep and short fold forelimbs adjacent to the surface fault traces. These surface manifestations are highly segmented and have been subdivided into three or four primary fault sections and multiple shorter strands due to discontinuities in the surface trace and changes in the overall fault strike. The faults are mainly North–South trending, west-dipping close to pure reverse dip-slip faults that offset a thick sequence of Quaternary glacial outwash and late Neogene lake and stream sediments, up to 1,000 m (3,300 ft) thick, from the Southern Alps in the Mackenzie Basin. At depths greater than 300 m (980 ft) the Ostler Fault is a single 45–55° westerly dipping structure, consistent with observations that suggest that the entire Ostler fault has behaved as a kinematically linked array. The fault has been partially characterised down to a depth of 1.5 km (0.93 mi).

=== Activity ===
It is likely that there was a partial rupture that caused debris flow and perhaps up to a 1 m (3 ft 3 in) slip about 500 years ago, and surface rupture cracks are still present. Larger surface-rupturing earthquakes occurred about 3000, 6000 and 10,000 years ago. A 20 m (66 ft) vertical rupture occurred 18,000 years ago. Contemporary risk is associated with the vertical slip rate of at least 1.1 mm (0.043 in)/year with a recurrence interval of 3000 years and the non trivial size of past events.
