= Omarama =

Town in the South Island of New Zealand

- Town
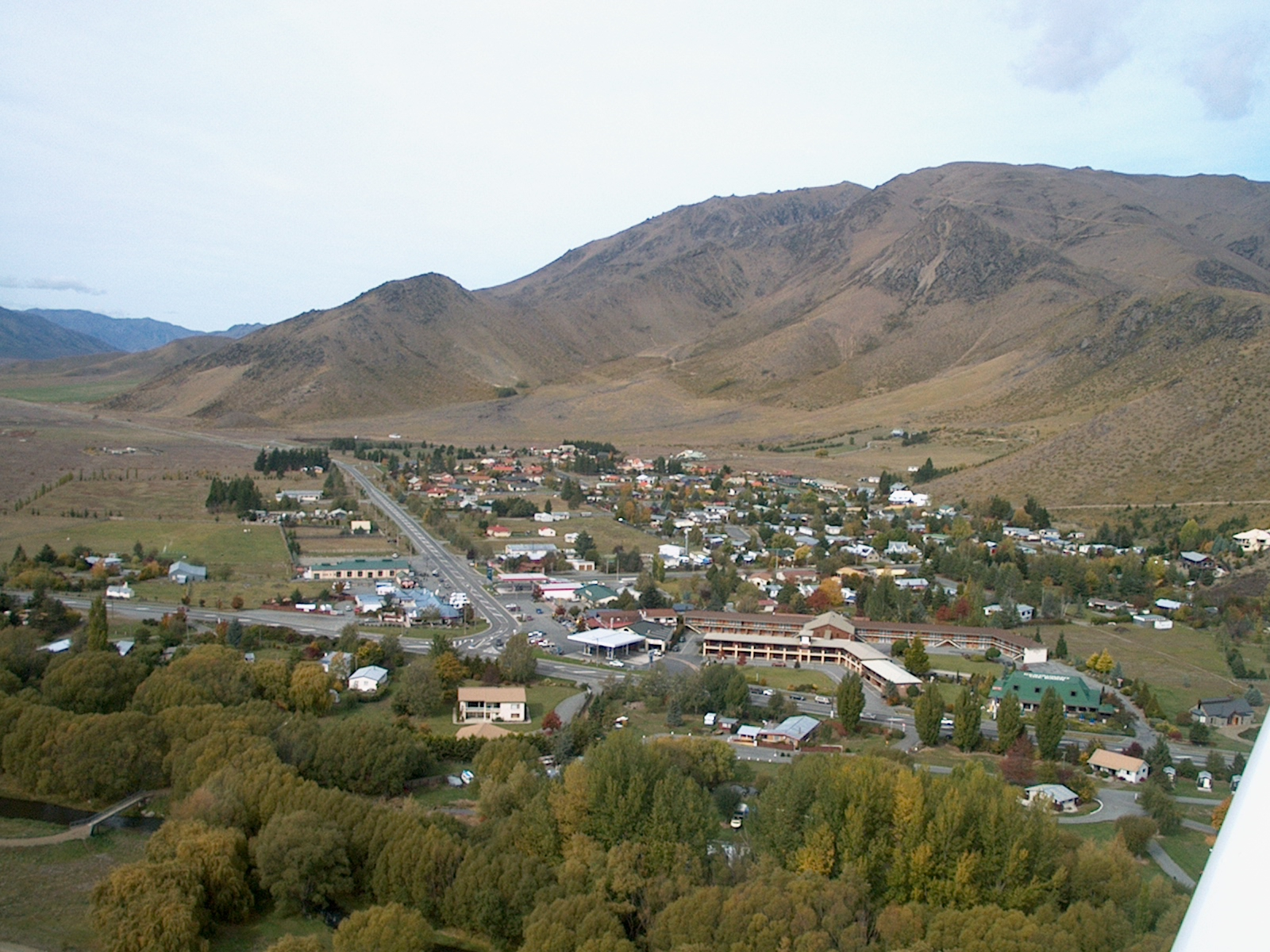
- Motto: The Place of Light
- Interactive map of Omarama
- Coordinates: 44°29′0″S 169°58′0″E
- Country: New Zealand
- Region: Canterbury
- Territorial authority: Waitaki District
- Ward: Ahuriri Ward
- Community: Ahuriri Community
- Electorates: Waitaki; Te Tai Tonga (Māori)

Government
  - Territorial authority: Waitaki District Council
  - Regional council: Environment Canterbury
  - Mayor of Waitaki: Melanie Tavendale
  - Waitaki MP: Miles Anderson
  - Te Tai Tonga MP: Mananui Ramsden

Area
  - Total: 8.30 km^{2} (3.20 sq mi)

Population (June 2025)
  - Total: 370
  - Density: 45/km^{2} (120/sq mi)
- Time zone: UTC+12 (NZST)
  - Summer (DST): UTC+13 (NZDT)
- Local iwi: Ngāi Tahu

Omarama is a small town (estimated population 370 as of June 2025) at the junction of State Highways 8 and 83, near the southern end of the Mackenzie Basin, in the South Island of New Zealand. Omarama is in the Waitaki District, in the southern Canterbury region. The Ahuriri River is a short distance to the north of the township. Omarama is 30 km (20 minutes drive) southwest of Twizel, 40 km (30 minutes drive) southeast of Lake Ōhau and 32 km (21 minutes drive) northeast of the Lindis Pass.

Omarama is primarily a rural service centre, providing local farmers and other residents with necessities and facilities such as grocery shopping, fuel and mechanical services, and a post shop. In recent years these and similar services have expanded moderately, due to the increase in new residents and visitors, including anglers, artists, astronomers, sailplane enthusiasts, skiers and tourists. A significant proportion of permanent village residents are employees of, or contractors to, Meridian Energy Limited, a state-owned enterprise that is responsible for the nearby dams and powerstations that are part of New Zealand's hydroelectricity generation.

== Toponymy ==
Various explanations have been offered for the meaning of the name Omarama, which comes from the Māori language. The ethnographer Herries Beattie reported that it referred to a chief named Marama, thus meaning literally "Of Marama". Publisher A. W. Reed offered the literal constructions o ("the place of") marama ("moon", or "light") – in modern orthography these would be Ōmarama ("the place of moon") or Ōmārama ("the place of light"). Another explanation is that marama means "marram grass, which was planted here under government instructions". Some tourism websites promote the name Ōmārama and the meaning "place of light".

== History ==
The Omarama area had numerous important food sources for the Ngāi Tahu Māori iwi (tribe) in what would later be named the Mackenzie Basin.

The first European to visit Omarama was Walter Mantell, in December 1852. European settlement began in 1857 with the establishment of the Benmore and Ben Ohau stations.

In 1877, Hipa Te Maihāroa with over 100 supporters travelled up the Waitaki River to Omarama and camped there to reaffirm the Ngāi Tahu claim to the interior of the South Island. This led to numerous visits from the government and Ngāi Tahu leaders. In 1879, they were evicted by an armed constabulary. Te Maiharoa and his followers then moved to the mouth of the Waitaki River.

== Government ==
The Waitaki District Council provides local government services to Omarama. In 2020, the council published a masterplan for developing Omarama. Omarama is part of the Waitaki electorate.

== Demographics ==
Omarama is described as a rural settlement by Statistics New Zealand, and covers 8.30 km^{2} (3.20 sq mi). It had an estimated population of 370 as of June 2025, with a population density of 45 people per km^{2}. It is part of the larger Aviemore statistical area.

Historical population for Omarama
Year	Pop.	±% p.a.
2006	231	—
2013	270	+2.25%
2018	291	+1.51%
2023	354	+4.00%

Ōmārama had a population of 354 in the 2023 New Zealand census, an increase of 63 people (21.6%) since the 2018 census, and an increase of 84 people (31.1%) since the 2013 census. There were 162 males, 186 females, and 6 people of other genders in 150 dwellings. 3.4% of people identified as LGBTIQ+. The median age was 49.5 years (compared with 38.1 years nationally). There were 45 people (12.7%) aged under 15 years, 54 (15.3%) aged 15 to 29, 171 (48.3%) aged 30 to 64, and 81 (22.9%) aged 65 or older.

People could identify as more than one ethnicity. The results were 86.4% European (Pākehā); 6.8% Māori; 0.8% Pasifika; 6.8% Asian; 0.8% Middle Eastern, Latin American and African New Zealanders (MELAA); and 8.5% other, which includes people giving their ethnicity as "New Zealander". English was spoken by 97.5%, Māori by 0.8%, and other languages by 8.5%. No language could be spoken by 1.7% (e.g. too young to talk). New Zealand Sign Language was known by 0.8%. The percentage of people born overseas was 21.2, compared with 28.8% nationally.

Religious affiliations were 28.0% Christian, 1.7% Hindu, and 1.7% other religions. People who answered that they had no religion were 56.8%, and 10.2% of people did not answer the census question.

Of those at least 15 years old, 54 (17.5%) people had a bachelor's or higher degree, 165 (53.4%) had a post-high school certificate or diploma, and 81 (26.2%) people exclusively held high school qualifications. The median income was $39,000, compared with $41,500 nationally. 27 people (8.7%) earned over $100,000 compared to 12.1% nationally. The employment status of those at least 15 was 177 (57.3%) full-time, 42 (13.6%) part-time, and 3 (1.0%) unemployed.

=== Aviemore statistical area ===
The Aviemore statistical area, which also includes Otematata, covers 3,483.90 km^{2} (1,345.14 sq mi) and had an estimated population of 950 as of June 2025, with a population density of 0.27 people per km^{2}.

Historical population for Aviemore
Year	Pop.	±% p.a.
2006	669	—
2013	702	+0.69%
2018	765	+1.73%
2023	909	+3.51%

Aviemore had a population of 909 in the 2023 New Zealand census, an increase of 144 people (18.8%) since the 2018 census, and an increase of 207 people (29.5%) since the 2013 census. There were 462 males, 438 females, and 6 people of other genders in 462 dwellings. 2.3% of people identified as LGBTIQ+. The median age was 48.5 years (compared with 38.1 years nationally). There were 123 people (13.5%) aged under 15 years, 144 (15.8%) aged 15 to 29, 414 (45.5%) aged 30 to 64, and 228 (25.1%) aged 65 or older.

People could identify as more than one ethnicity. The results were 88.8% European (Pākehā); 7.6% Māori; 1.7% Pasifika; 5.3% Asian; 1.3% Middle Eastern, Latin American and African New Zealanders (MELAA); and 6.3% other, which includes people giving their ethnicity as "New Zealander". English was spoken by 97.7%, Māori by 0.7%, Samoan by 0.3%, and other languages by 9.2%. No language could be spoken by 1.7% (e.g. too young to talk). New Zealand Sign Language was known by 0.7%. The percentage of people born overseas was 18.8, compared with 28.8% nationally.

Religious affiliations were 29.7% Christian, 1.0% Hindu, 1.0% Buddhist, 0.3% New Age, and 0.7% other religions. People who answered that they had no religion were 58.4%, and 8.9% of people did not answer the census question.

Of those at least 15 years old, 135 (17.2%) people had a bachelor's or higher degree, 444 (56.5%) had a post-high school certificate or diploma, and 198 (25.2%) people exclusively held high school qualifications. The median income was $39,700, compared with $41,500 nationally. 63 people (8.0%) earned over $100,000 compared to 12.1% nationally. The employment status of those at least 15 was 459 (58.4%) full-time, 93 (11.8%) part-time, and 3 (0.4%) unemployed.

== Economy ==
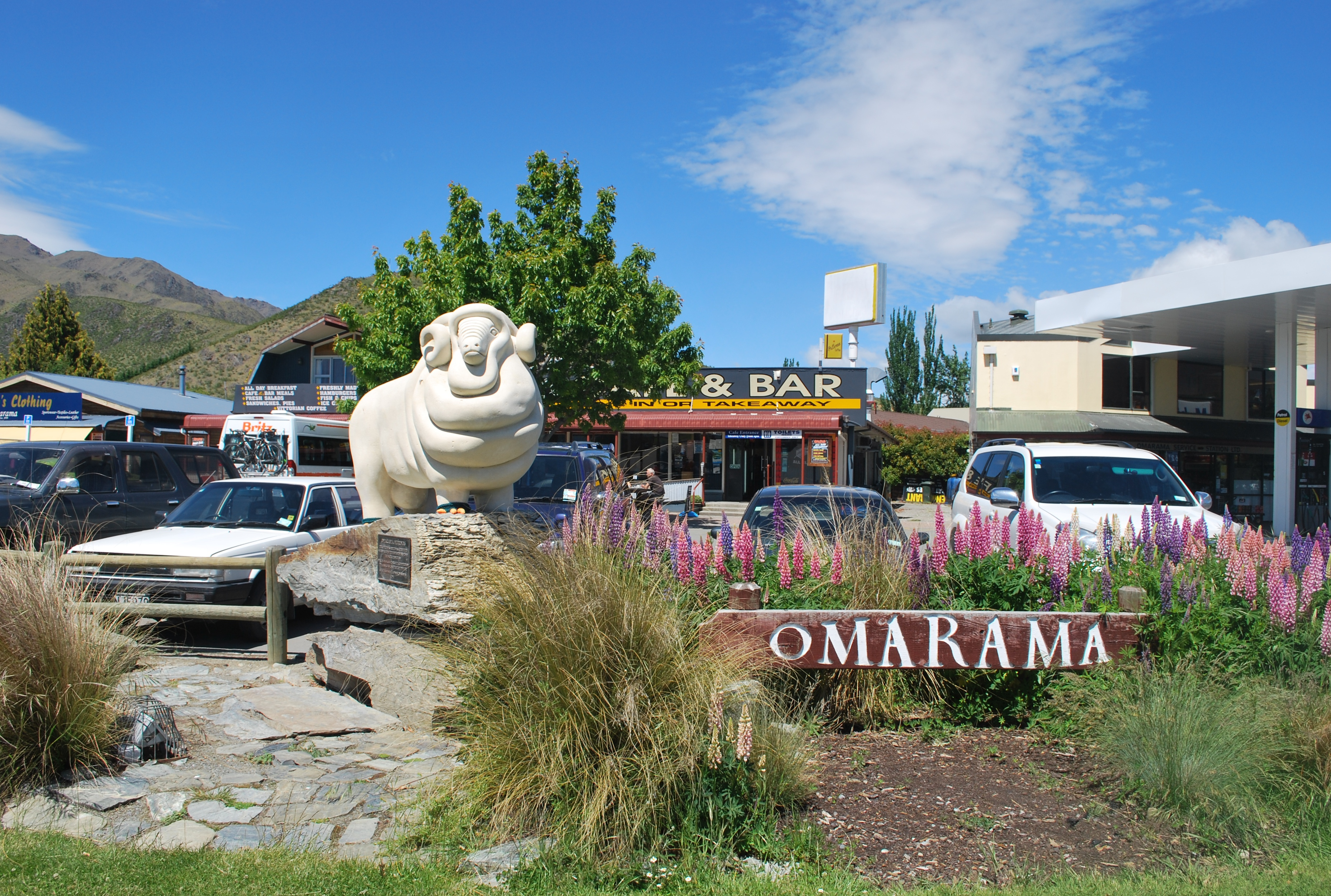
Omarama was traditionally a wool growing area.

Although traditionally sheep country, Omarama area farms, along with those within the rest of the Mackenzie Basin, have rapidly converted to predominantly dairy farming, due to falling sheep meat and wool prices, and the recent boom in dairy product earnings. The dairy conversion has made major changes to the local environment, with iconic tussock lands being ploughed and replaced by pasture, facilitated by new irrigation schemes. Large centre pivot irrigators and private canal networks now dominate much of the landscape. Recently however, diminishing returns on dairy-based agriculture have led to farmers investigating alternative methods and practices, some now experimenting with biofuel crops.

== Recreation and attractions ==
There are many rivers and lakes in and near Omarama suitable for recreational fishing. The nearby Ahuriri River is a noted fly-fishing river and adjacent Lake Benmore and Lake Ōhau are popular with boaters, as well as fly casters and other anglers. Commonly encountered fish species include salmon, and brown and rainbow trout.

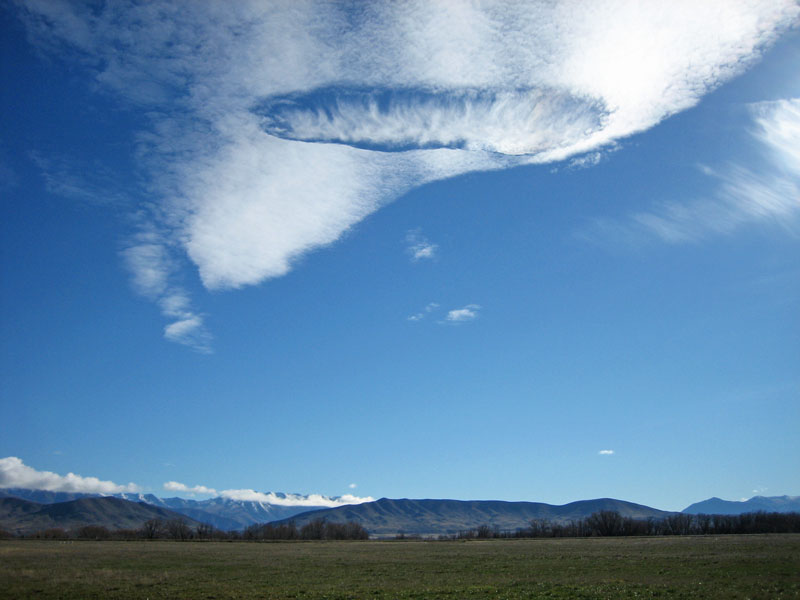
A fallstreak hole visible over Omarama, in May 2006

Benmore Peak Observatory is located approximately 13 km north of Omarama, atop the nearby Benmore Range. Omarama has an annual mid-winter star party. Local street lighting and other light sources are dimmed or switched off for the duration of the event.

Due to the strong gliding conditions in the Omarama area, and Mackenzie Basin, it is known as a world-class gliding location, gaining fame among sailplane pilots around the world after hosting the 1995 World Gliding Championships. Pilots come to Omarama to experience strong lee wave conditions, ridge soaring and thermal flying. It is common for Omarama-based gliders to soar hundreds of kilometres along the Southern Alps each day. In ideal conditions, it is possible for gliders to reach distances in excess of 2000 km. Several national and world gliding records have been achieved from Omarama, and the prevailing conditions have attracted record seekers such as Steve Fossett. The Omarama Gliding Club and several commercial gliding organisations are based in the town.

There are three skifields within the MacKenzie Basin; Ōhau, Round Hill, and Mount Dobson. Omarama is on the route of the Alps to Ocean Cycle Trail, after the trail was constructed following approval in 2010.

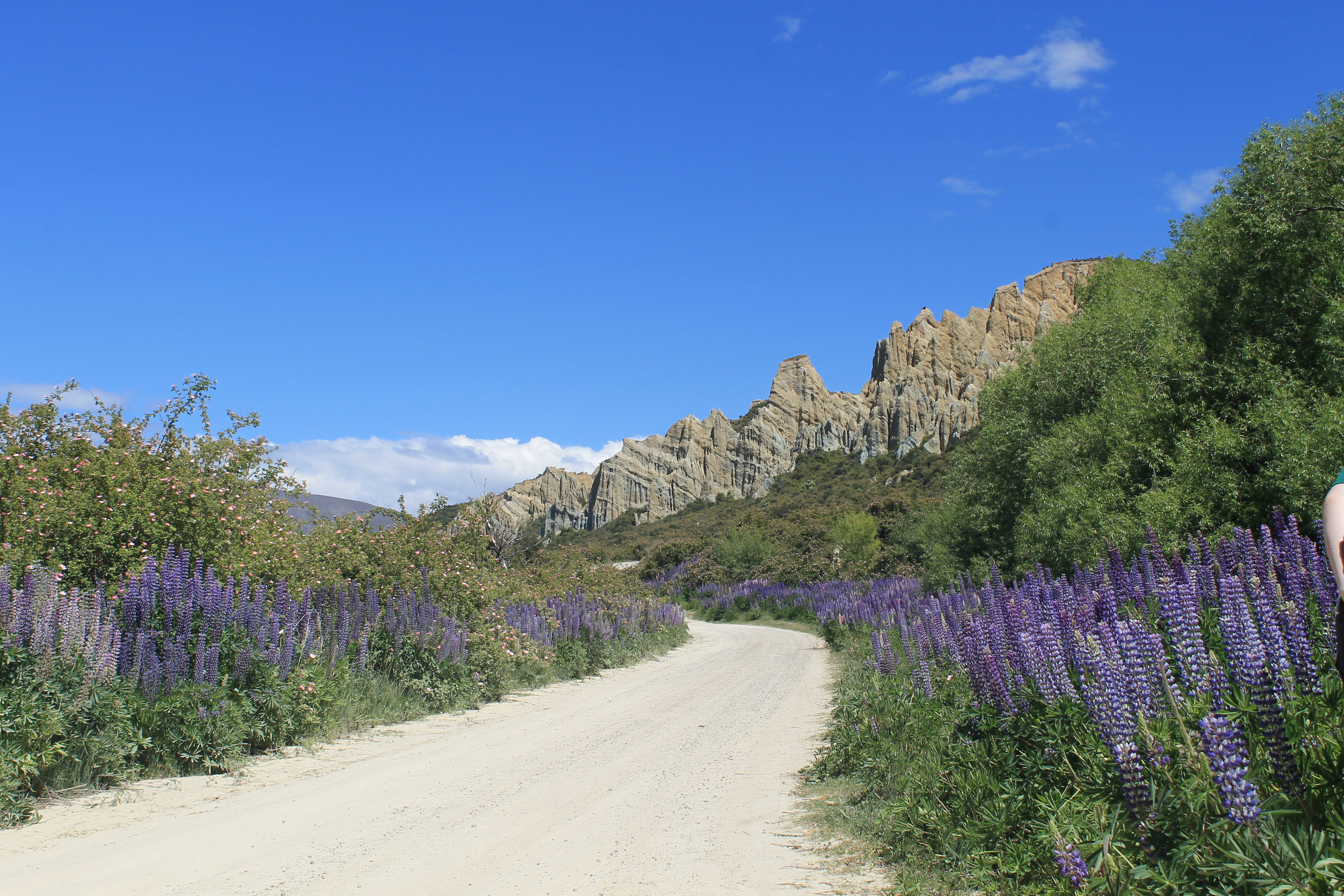
Omarama Clay Cliffs

Omarama is a popular holiday destination amongst those living in surrounding districts and provinces, many owning family holiday residences within the village. Tramping is also popular with locals and visitors alike, due to the spectacular and often rugged landscape. Due to the spectacular scenery, numerous artists regularly visit the Omarama area, and several are now permanent residents, exhibiting their Omarama and Mackenzie landscapes and other work in local galleries and further afield.

== Education ==
Omarama School was first built on Buscot Station in the 1930s. It was moved to its present site on State Highway 8 in Omarama during the 1940s. As a result of people moving to work at the local hydro electricity development, Omarama School increased in size to a four-teacher school in the late 1980s. Today, 2.5 FTE of teachers teach at the school and its catchment area serves Omarama and a wide area of the Upper Waitaki high country. Omarama School caters for new entrants to Year 8 children with two classrooms, a school library and a covered solar heated pool on a 11938 square metre site. Omarama School has a roll of 28 students as of July 2026.

== In popular culture ==
In his novel The Zombie Survival Guide, Max Brooks of World War Z fame makes reference to Omarama as site of a historical zombie attack.

Disney's movie Mulan released in 2020 was partially filmed at the Omarama Clay Cliffs.

== Climate ==
Climate data for Omarama (Tara Hills), elevation 485 m (1,591 ft), (1991–2020 normals, extremes 1949–present)
Month	Jan	Feb	Mar	Apr	May	Jun	Jul	Aug	Sep	Oct	Nov	Dec	Year
Record high °C (°F)	34.9 (94.8)	34.1 (93.4)	32.1 (89.8)	27.2 (81.0)	22.9 (73.2)	17.9 (64.2)	16.8 (62.2)	21.6 (70.9)	24.7 (76.5)	28.2 (82.8)	29.9 (85.8)	32.8 (91.0)	34.9 (94.8)
Mean maximum °C (°F)	30.8 (87.4)	30.6 (87.1)	27.2 (81.0)	22.5 (72.5)	18.6 (65.5)	15.0 (59.0)	13.3 (55.9)	15.9 (60.6)	19.9 (67.8)	23.4 (74.1)	25.8 (78.4)	28.4 (83.1)	32.0 (89.6)
Mean daily maximum °C (°F)	23.4 (74.1)	23.5 (74.3)	20.6 (69.1)	16.2 (61.2)	12.1 (53.8)	8.1 (46.6)	7.5 (45.5)	10.3 (50.5)	13.7 (56.7)	16.4 (61.5)	18.8 (65.8)	21.5 (70.7)	16.0 (60.8)
Daily mean °C (°F)	16.3 (61.3)	16.0 (60.8)	13.5 (56.3)	9.8 (49.6)	6.5 (43.7)	3.0 (37.4)	2.4 (36.3)	4.8 (40.6)	7.5 (45.5)	9.9 (49.8)	12.1 (53.8)	14.7 (58.5)	9.7 (49.5)
Mean daily minimum °C (°F)	9.2 (48.6)	8.6 (47.5)	6.4 (43.5)	3.3 (37.9)	0.9 (33.6)	−2.1 (28.2)	−2.8 (27.0)	−0.8 (30.6)	1.3 (34.3)	3.5 (38.3)	5.4 (41.7)	7.8 (46.0)	3.4 (38.1)
Mean minimum °C (°F)	2.0 (35.6)	1.7 (35.1)	−0.6 (30.9)	−3.2 (26.2)	−4.7 (23.5)	−7.7 (18.1)	−8.2 (17.2)	−5.6 (21.9)	−4.1 (24.6)	−2.8 (27.0)	−1.4 (29.5)	1.1 (34.0)	−9.7 (14.5)
Record low °C (°F)	−0.8 (30.6)	−2.6 (27.3)	−7.1 (19.2)	−7.2 (19.0)	−10.8 (12.6)	−21.0 (−5.8)	−19.5 (−3.1)	−11.6 (11.1)	−8.2 (17.2)	−6.8 (19.8)	−4.7 (23.5)	−2.3 (27.9)	−21.0 (−5.8)
Average rainfall mm (inches)	44.9 (1.77)	38.4 (1.51)	35.9 (1.41)	34.8 (1.37)	44.9 (1.77)	38.1 (1.50)	39.1 (1.54)	34.7 (1.37)	37.7 (1.48)	41.8 (1.65)	45.5 (1.79)	54.4 (2.14)	490.2 (19.3)
Source: Earth Sciences NZ
