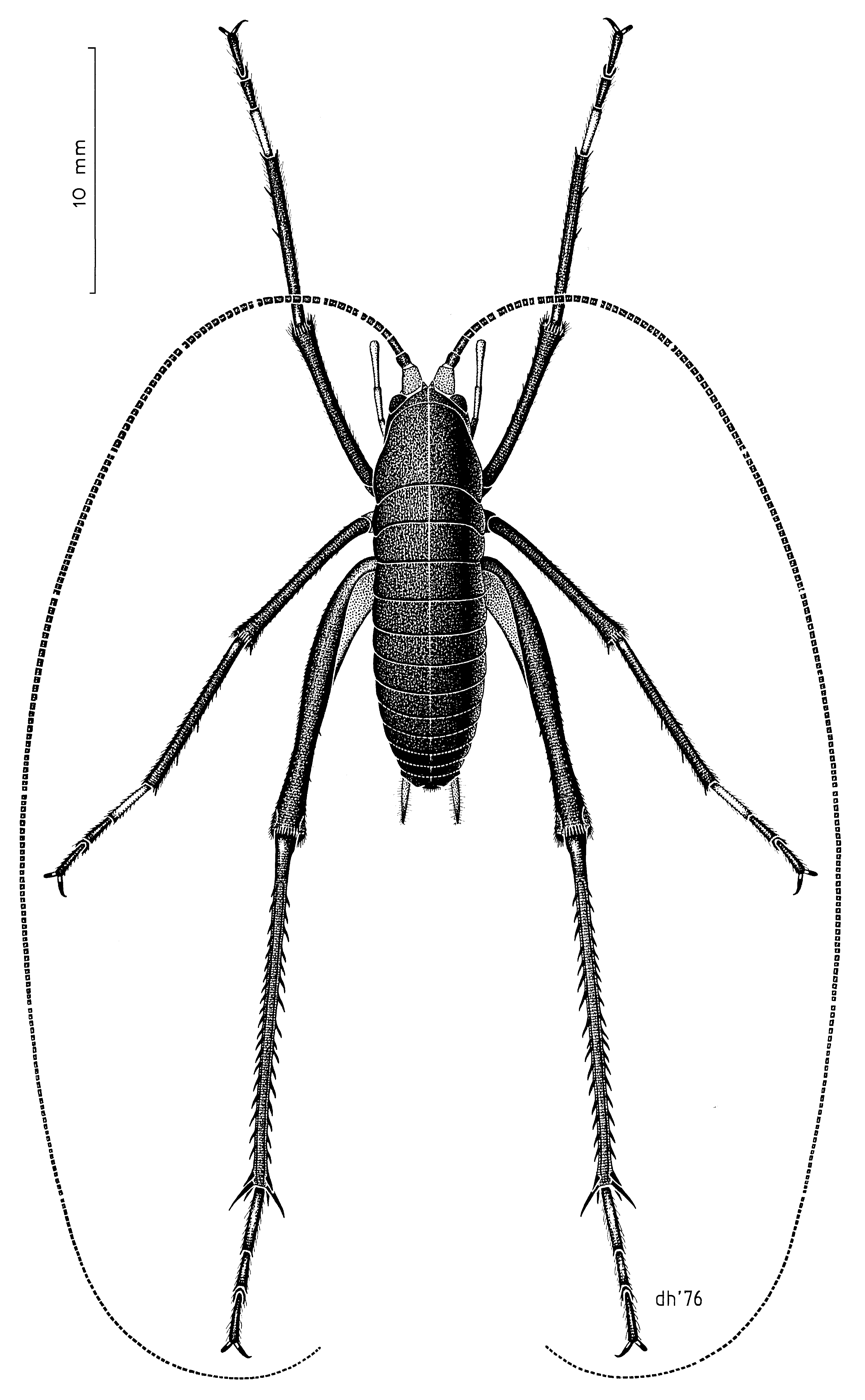
- Pharmacus montanus illustrated by Des Helmore

Scientific classification
- Kingdom: Animalia
- Phylum: Arthropoda
- Class: Insecta
- Order: Orthoptera
- Suborder: Ensifera
- Family: Rhaphidophoridae
- Genus: Pharmacus
- Species: P. montanus

Binomial name
- Pharmacus montanus Pictet & Saussure, 1891

Synonyms
- Pharmacus dumbletoni Richards, 1972

= Pharmacus montanus =

Species of orthopteran insect

Pharmacus montanus, the Mount Cook flea, is a type of cave wētā found above the tree line in the South Island of New Zealand. It was first described by Francois Jules Pictet de la Rive and Henri Saussure in 1893. Pharmacus montanus is one of the most widespread species within the genus, found from Aoraki/Mount Cook to Mount Owen in northern South Island (Kahurangi National Park). The highest recorded specimens of this species are from a population between 2700 and 2800 m above sea level on Mount Annan above the Tasman Glacier.
