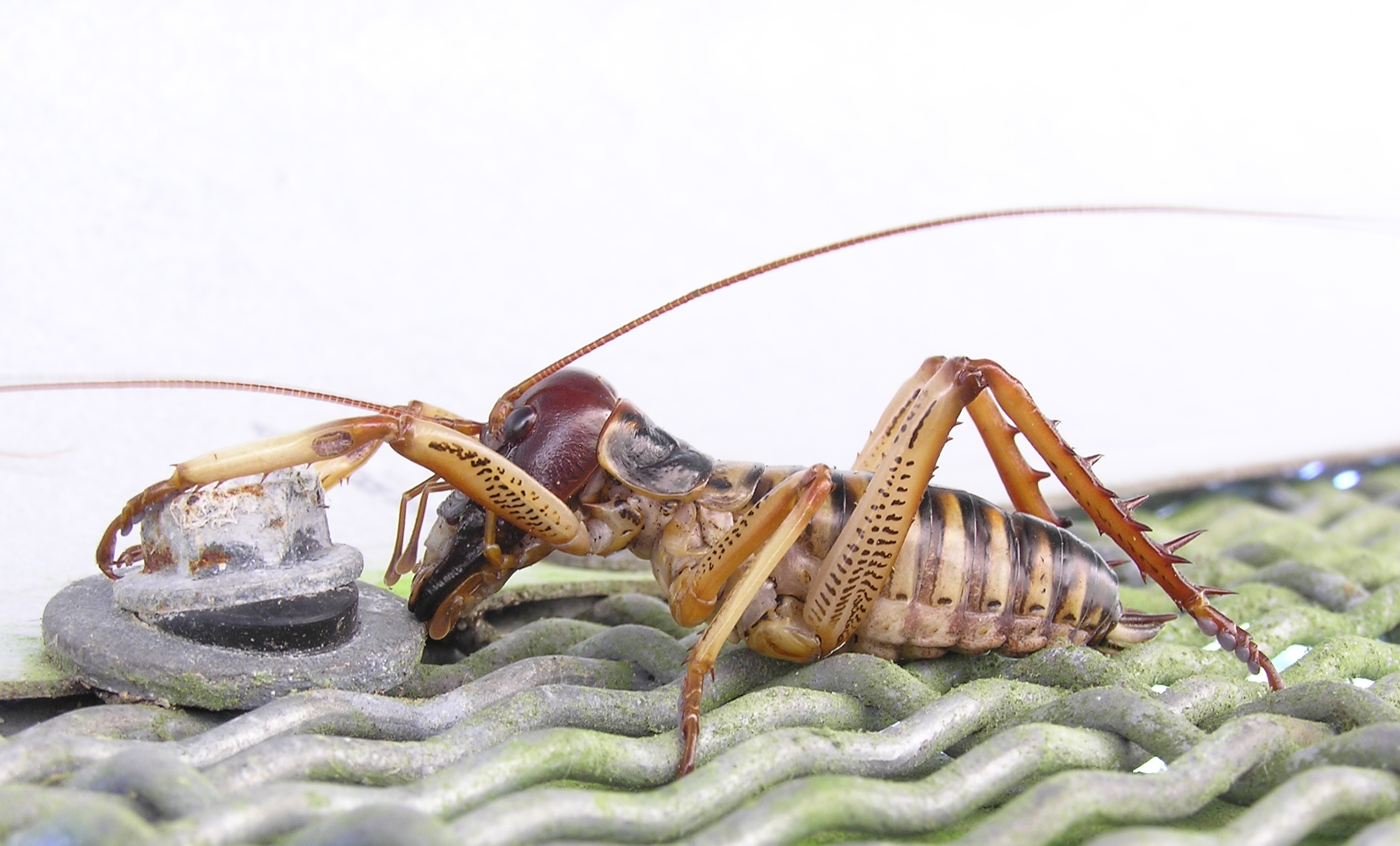
- Male Wellington tree wētā

Scientific classification
- Kingdom: Animalia
- Phylum: Arthropoda
- Clade: Pancrustacea
- Class: Insecta
- Order: Orthoptera
- Suborder: Ensifera

Groups included
- Stenopelmatoidea; Anostostomatidae; Rhaphidophoroidea; Rhaphidophoridae

= Wētā =

Informal group of orthopteran insects

Wētā (also spelled weta in English) is the common name for a group of about 100 insect species in the families Anostostomatidae and Rhaphidophoridae endemic to New Zealand. They are giant flightless crickets, and some are among the heaviest insects in the world. Generally nocturnal, most small species are carnivores and scavengers while the larger species are herbivorous. Although some endemic birds (and tuatara) likely prey on them, wētā are disproportionately preyed upon by introduced mammals, and some species are now critically endangered.

== Name ==
Wētā is a loanword, from the Māori-language word wētā, which refers to this whole group of large insects; some types of wētā have a specific Māori name. In New Zealand English, it is spelled either "weta" or "wētā". The form with macrons is increasingly common in formal writing, as the Māori word weta (without macrons) instead means "excrement". Words of Māori origin in New Zealand English are both singular and plural.

== General characteristics ==
Many wētā are large by insect standards and some species are among the largest and heaviest in the world. Their physical appearance is like a katydid, long-horned grasshopper, or cricket, but the hind legs are enlarged and usually very spiny. Many are wingless. Because they can cope with variations in temperature, wētā are found in a variety of environments, including alpine, forests, grasslands, caves, shrub lands and urban gardens. They are nocturnal, and all New Zealand species are flightless but closely related to winged species in Australia. Different species have different diets. Most wētā are predators or omnivores preying on other invertebrates, but the tree and giant wētā eat mostly lichens, leaves, flowers, seed-heads, and fruit.

Male giant wētā (Deinacrida spp.) are smaller than females and they show scramble competition for mates. Tree wētā (Hemideina spp.) males have larger heads than females and a polygynandrous mating system with harem formation and male-male competition for mates. Ground wētā (Hemiandrus spp.) males provide nuptial food gifts when mating and females of some species provide maternal care. Wētā eggs are laid in soil over the autumn and winter months and hatch the following spring. A wētā takes between one and two years to reach adulthood, and over this time will have to shed its skin around ten times as it grows.

Wētā can bite with powerful mandibles. Tree wētā bites are painful but not particularly common. Tree wētā lift their hind legs in a defence displays to look large and spiky, but they tend to retreat if given the chance. Tree wētā raise their hind legs into the air in warning to foes, and then bring them down to stridulate. Pegs or ridges on the side of their abdomen are struck by a patch of fine pegs at the inner surface of their hind legs (femur) and this action makes a distinctive sound. These actions are also used in defence of a gallery by competing males. The female wētā looks as if she has a stinger, but it is an ovipositor, which enables her to lay eggs inside rotting or mossy wood or soil. Some species of Hemiandrus have very short ovipositors, related perhaps to their burrowing into soil and laying their eggs in a special chamber at the end of the burrow.

== Taxonomy and evolution ==
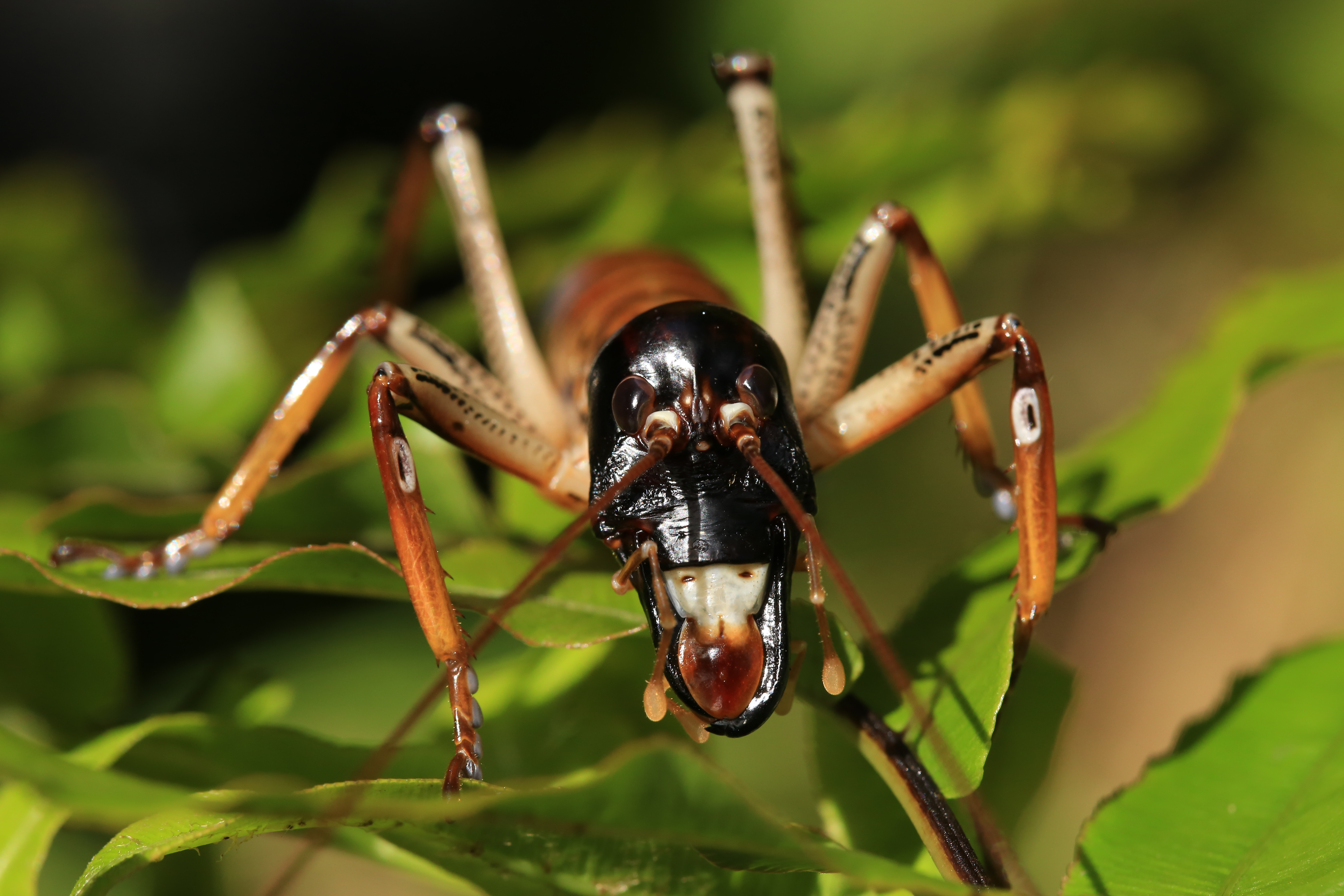
Male tree wētā Hemideina thoracica

Fossilised orthopterans have been found in Russia, China, South Africa, Australia, and New Zealand, but the relationships are open to different interpretations by scientists. Most wētā of both families are found in the Southern Hemisphere. Wētā were probably present in ancient Gondwana before Zealandia separated from it. Rhaphidophoridae dispersed over sea to colonise the Chatham Islands (Rēkohu), the Auckland (Motu Maha), Snares (Tini Heke), Bounty (Moutere Hauiri) and Campbell (Motu Ihupuku) Islands. The present species might have resulted from a recent radiation, which conflicts with those earlier ideas about dispersal of wētā forebears around the Southern Hemisphere (Wallis et al. 2000).

Giant, tree, ground, and tusked wētā are all members of the family Anostostomatidae (formerly in the Stenopelmatidae, but recently separated). Cave wētā are better referred to as tokoriro, since they are members of the family Rhaphidophoridae, called cave crickets or camel crickets elsewhere, in a different ensiferan superfamily. In New Zealand there were as of 2014 19 genera of tokoriri, and their taxonomy is under review. Seven new species of South Island cave wētā were named and described in 2019, including Pleioplectron rodmorrisi.

== Species ==
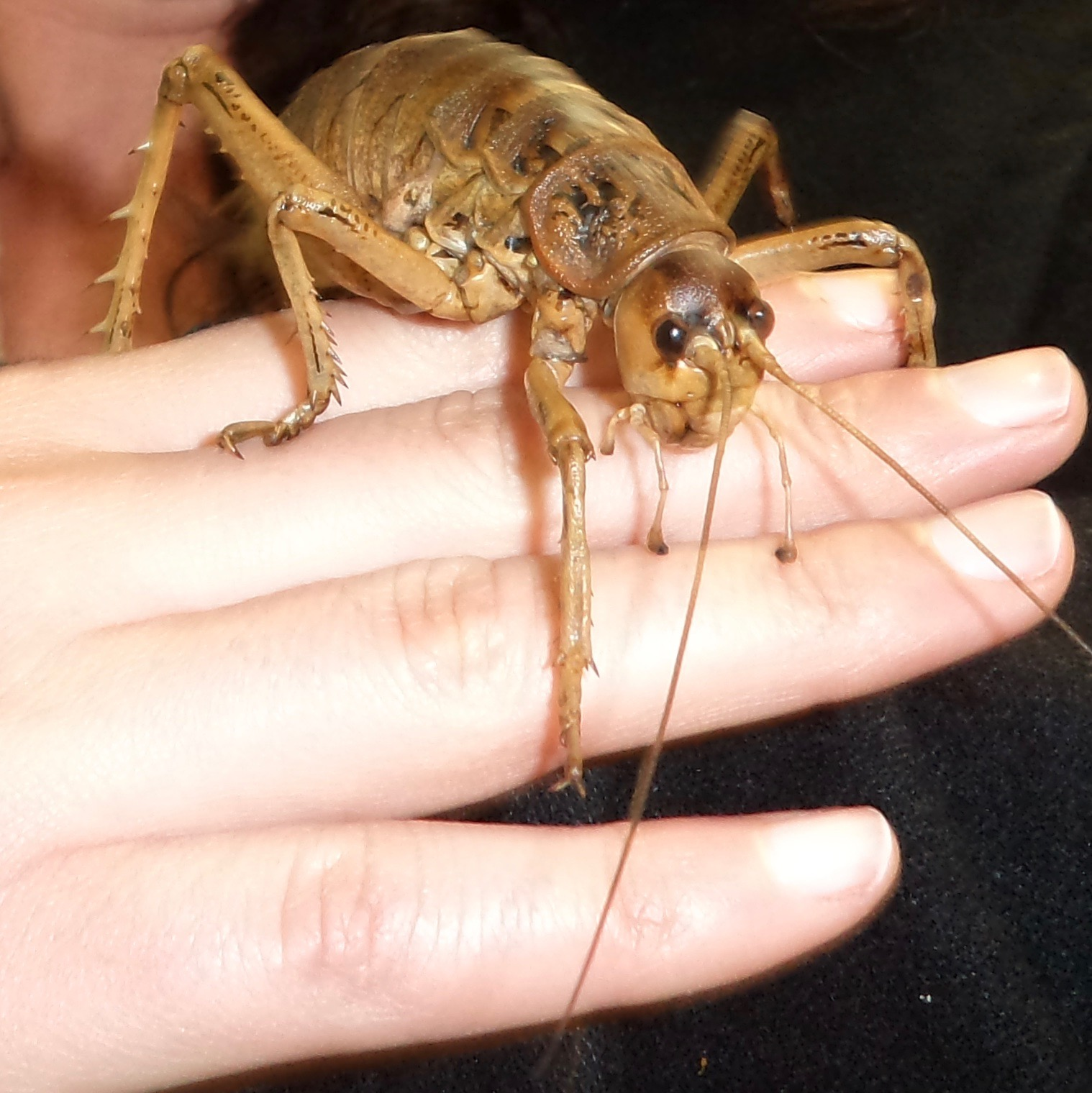
Cook Strait giant wētā (Deinacrida rugosa)

=== Giant wētā ===
The 11 species of giant wētā (Deinacrida spp.) are endemic to New Zealand and legally protected. Giant wētā (wētā punga in Māori) are large by insect standards. They are heavy herbivorous Orthoptera with a body length of up to 100 mm (3.9 in), excluding their long legs and antennae, and weigh about 20–30 g. A captive giant wētā (Deinacrida heteracantha) filled with eggs reached a record 70 g, making it one of the heaviest documented insects in the world and heavier than a sparrow. The largest species of giant wētā is the Little Barrier Island wētā, also known as the wētāpunga. Giant wētā tend to be less social and more passive than tree wētā (Hemideina spp.). They are classified in the genus Deinacrida, which is Greek for "terrible grasshopper". They are found primarily on small islands off the coast of the main islands or at high elevation on New Zealand's South Island (e.g. the alpine scree wētā D. connectens), and are sometimes considered examples of island gigantism.

=== Tree wētā ===
Tree wētā (Hemideina) are commonly encountered in suburban settings in New Zealand's North Island. They are up to 40 mm long and most commonly live in holes in trees formed by beetle and moth larvae or where rot has set in after a twig has broken off. The hole, called a gallery, is maintained by the wētā and any growth of the bark surrounding the opening is chewed away. They readily occupy a preformed gallery in a piece of wood (a "wētā motel") and can be kept in a suburban garden as pets. A gallery might house a harem of up to 10 adult females and one male. Tree wētā are nocturnal. Their diet consists of plants and small insects. The males have much larger jaws than the females, though both sexes will stridulate and bite when threatened.

The seven species of tree wētā (pūtangatanga in Māori) are:

- The Auckland tree wētā Hemideina thoracica can be found throughout the North Island apart from the Wellington-Wairarapa region. Within this range are seven chromosome races.
- The Wellington tree wētā Hemideina crassidens occupies Wellington, the Wairarapa, the northern parts of the South Island, and the West Coast.
- Hemideina trewicki is found in Hawke's Bay.
- H. femorata is found in Marlborough and Canterbury.
- The rare H. ricta species occurs in Banks Peninsula.
- The West Coast bush wētā H. broughi largely overlaps with the Wellington tree wētā in Nelson and the northern portion of the West Coast.
- H. maori, the mountain stone wētā, lives above the tree line in the Southern Alps.

The North Island species each have a distinctive set of chromosomes (karyotype). When the territories of species overlap, as with the related species H. femorata and H. ricta on Banks Peninsula, they may interbreed, although offspring are sterile.

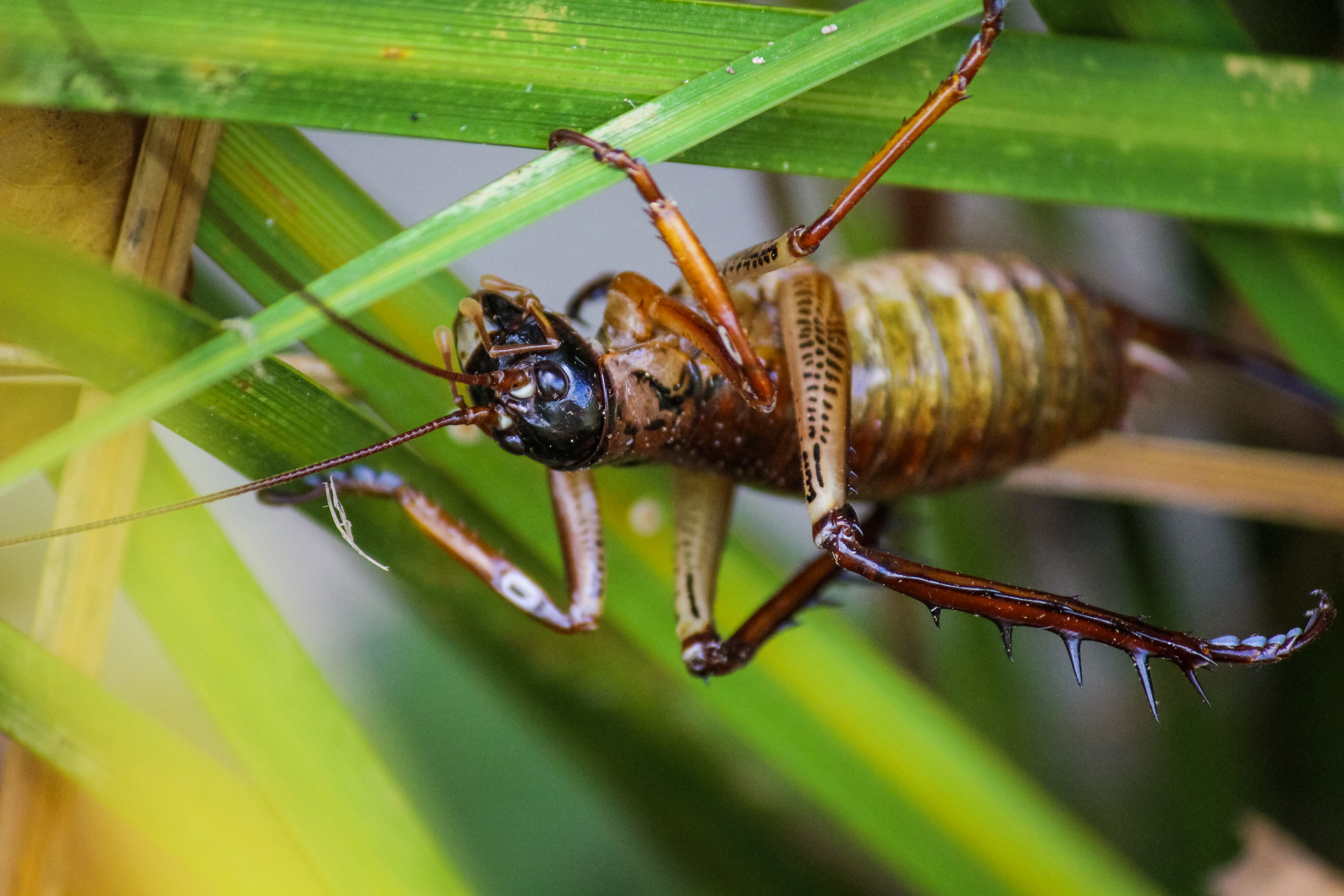
Auckland tree wētā (Hemideina thoracica)

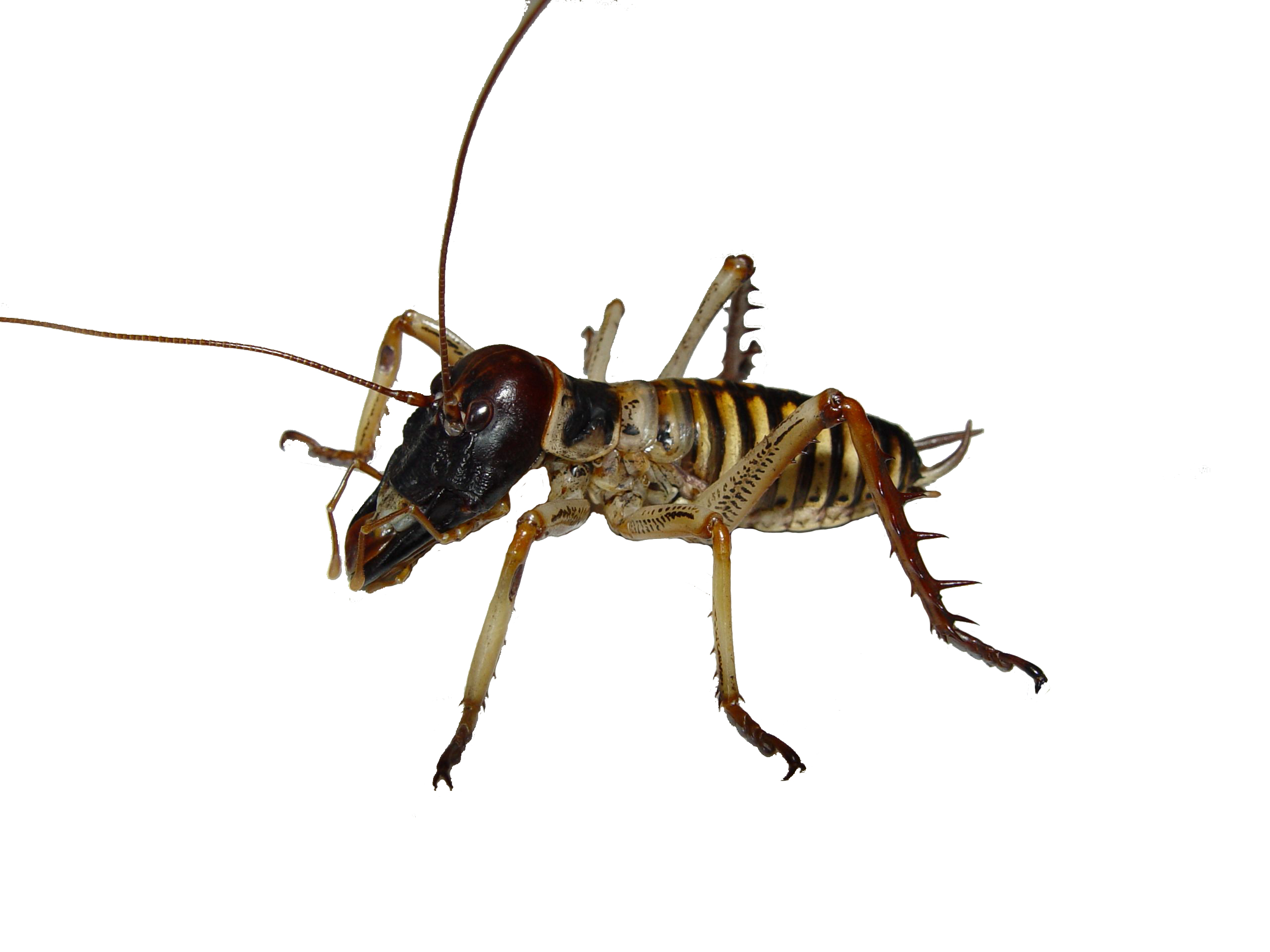
Male Hemideina crassidens (Wellington tree wētā)

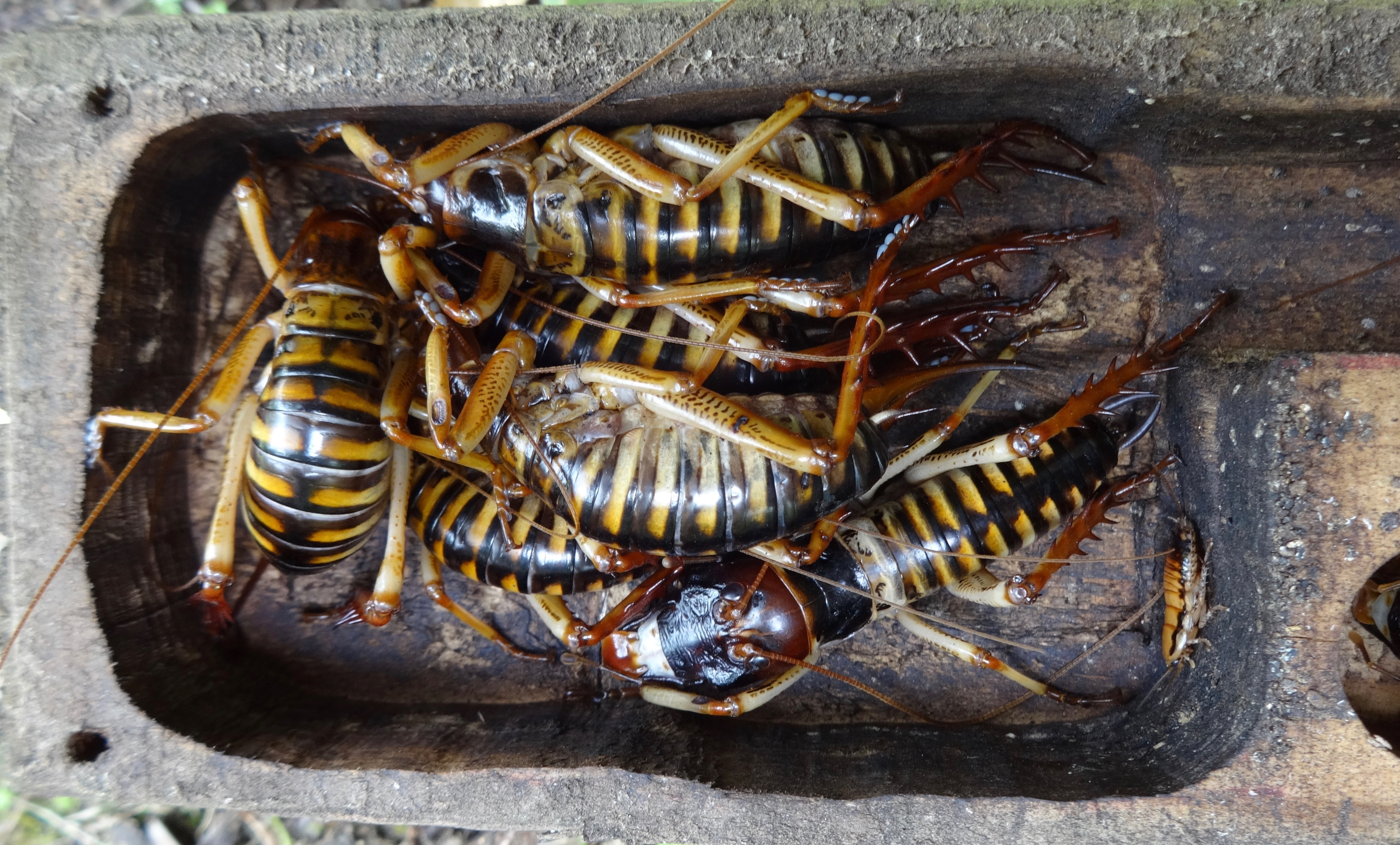
Harem of 5 adult females and one male Wellington tree wētā (Hemideina crassidens)

=== Tusked wētā ===
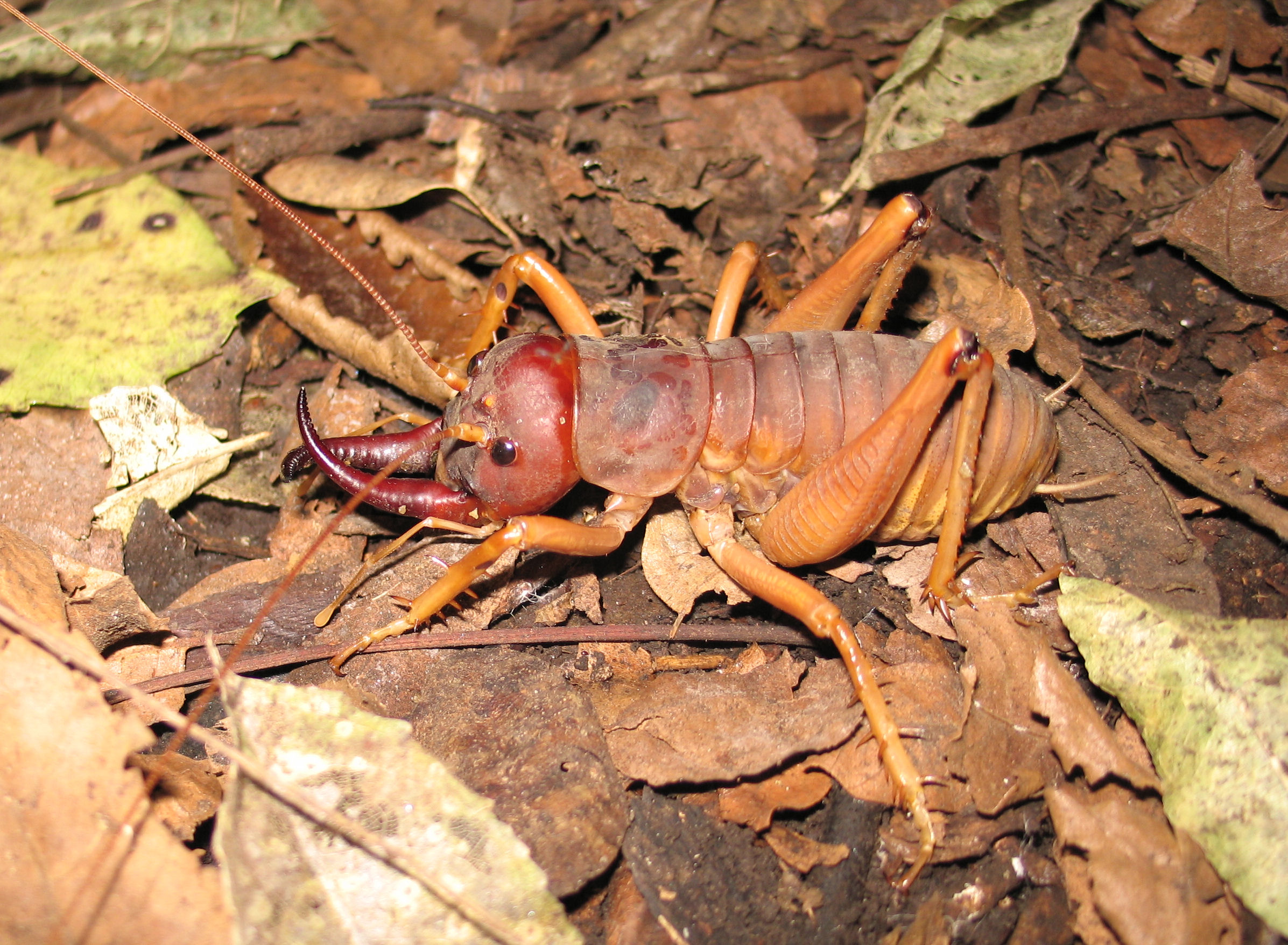
Motuweta isolata, Mercury Islands tusked wētā.

Tusked wētā are characterised by long, curved tusks projecting forward from the male's mandibles. The tusks are used in male-to-male combat, not for biting. Female tusked wētā look similar to ground wētā. Tusked wētā are mainly carnivorous, eating worms and insects. There are three known species in two different subfamilies: the Northland tusked wētā Anisoura nicobarica (originally described as a ground wētā, Hemiandrus monstrosus), in the subfamily Deinacridinae; the Mercury Islands tusked wētā Motuweta isolata; and the most recently discovered, the Raukumara tusked wētā Motuweta riparia. Motuweta is in the same subfamily as ground wētā, Anostostomatinae.

The Northland tusked wētā lives in tree holes, similar to tree wētā. The Mercury Islands or Middle Island tusked wētā was discovered in 1970. It is a ground-dwelling wētā, entombing itself in shallow burrows during the day, and is critically endangered: a Department of Conservation breeding programme has established new colonies on other islands in the Mercury group. The Raukumara tusked wētā was discovered in 1996, in the Raukumara Range near the Bay of Plenty. It has the unusual habit of diving into streams and hiding underwater for up to three minutes if threatened.

=== Ground wētā ===
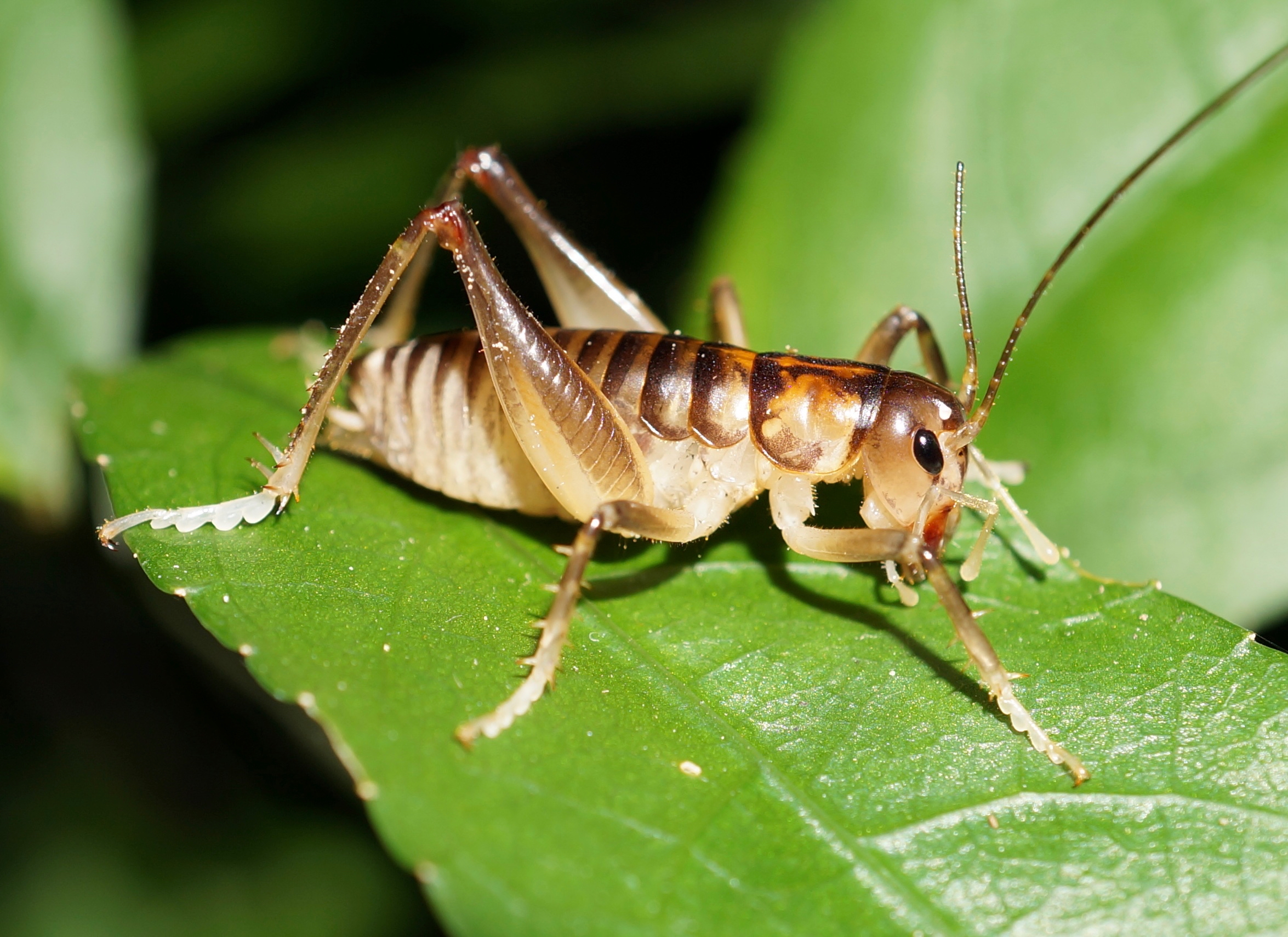
A male ground wētā, Hemiandrus pallitarsis

Ground wētā are classified in to the two genera Hemiandrus and Anderus. The species in these two genera are each more closely related to winged Australian species than they are to each other. About 30 species of ground wētā occur in New Zealand, and several similar (undescribed) species are found in Australia. They are also very like the Californian Cnemotettix—a similarity perhaps due to their very similar habits and habitat. 19 Hemiandrus species have been described from New Zealand and other distinct populations require further study. They hide in burrows in the ground during the day, and those that live in open ground (e.g., H. focalis, H. maia) conceal their exit holes with a specially made perforated door. During the night, ground wētā hunt invertebrate prey and eat fruit. Most female ground wētā have long ovipositors (e.g. H. maculifrons), but some have short ovipositors and maternal care (e.g. H. maia, H. pallitarsis).

=== Cave wētā ===
The 60 species of cave wētā or tokoriro are only very distant relatives of the other types of wētā, being classified in several genera of subfamily Macropathinae in family Rhaphidophoridae.

They have extra-long antennae, and may have long, slender legs and a passive demeanour. Although they have no hearing organs on their front legs like species of Hemideina and Deinacrida, some (such as Talitropsis) are very sensitive to ground vibrations sensed through pads on their feet. Specialised hairs on the cerci and organs on the antennae are also sensitive to low-frequency vibrations in the air.

Although some do live in caves, most species (e.g. Talitropsis sedilloti) live in the forest among leaf litter, logs, under bark (e.g. Isoplectron), inside tree holes (e.g. Neonetus sp.) and amongst rocks in the mountains (e.g. Pharmacus). Cave-dwelling species may be active within the confines of their caves during the daytime, and those individuals close to cave entrances venture outside at night.

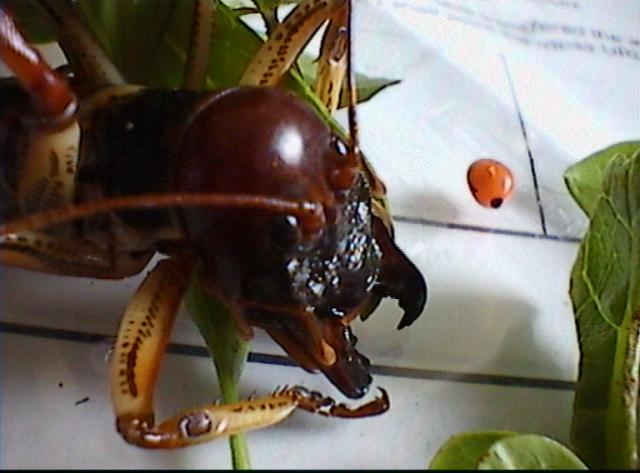
Face

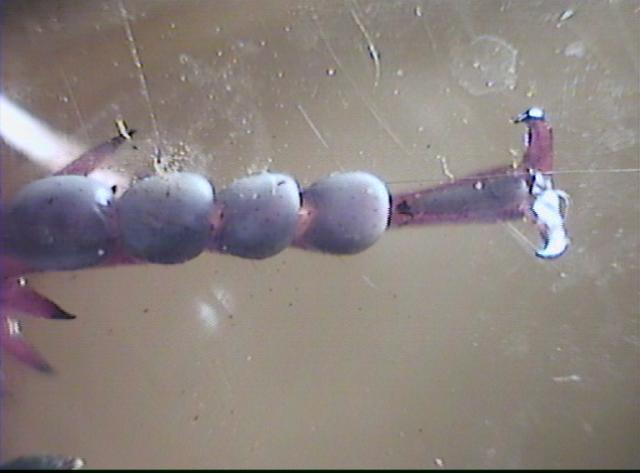
Lower leg (tarsus) with two claws and sensory pads

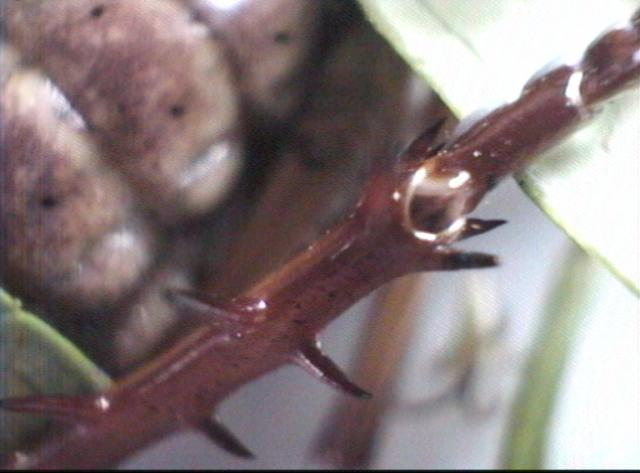
Upper leg

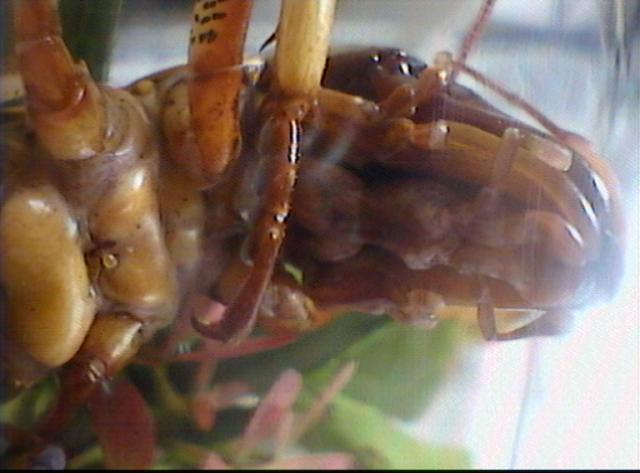
Underside with parasites

== Conservation ==
Although wētā had native predators in the form of birds (especially the weka and kiwi), reptiles, and bats before the arrival of humans, introduced species such as cats, hedgehogs, rats (including kiore) and mustelids have caused a sharp increase in the rate of predation. They are also vulnerable to habitat destruction caused by humans and modification of their habitat caused by introduced browsers. New Zealand's Department of Conservation considers 16 of the over 100 species at risk. Programmes to prevent extinctions have been implemented since the 1970s.

Some especially endangered species are tracked by radio beacons.

== In popular culture ==
New Zealanders Peter Jackson, Richard Taylor, and Jamie Selkirk founded visual effects company Weta Digital (now known as Wētā FX), naming it after the insect. One of Jackson's films, King Kong, has among the Skull Island fauna oversized versions of the giant wētā, referred to with the scientific name "Deinacrida rex" or "Wētā-rex".
