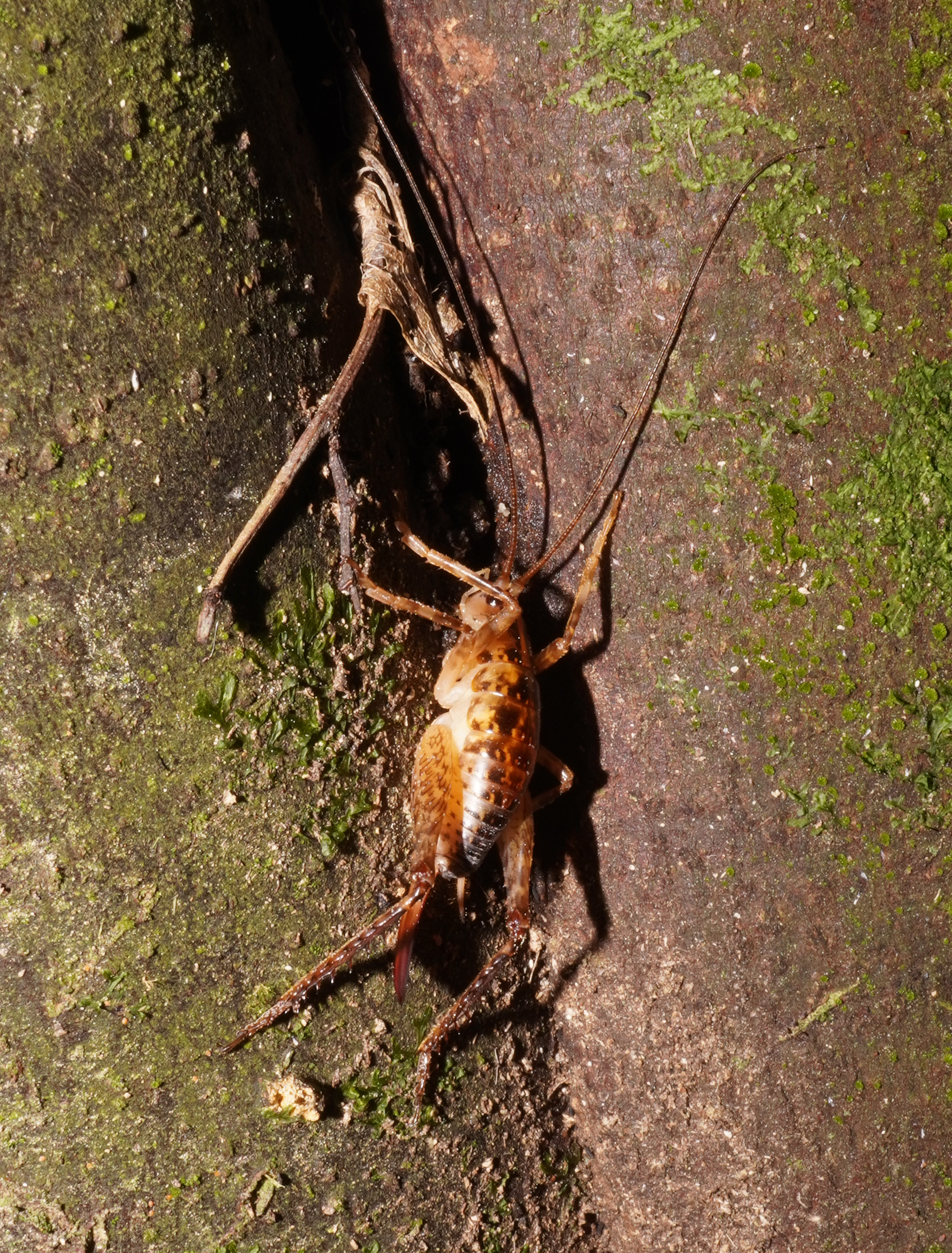

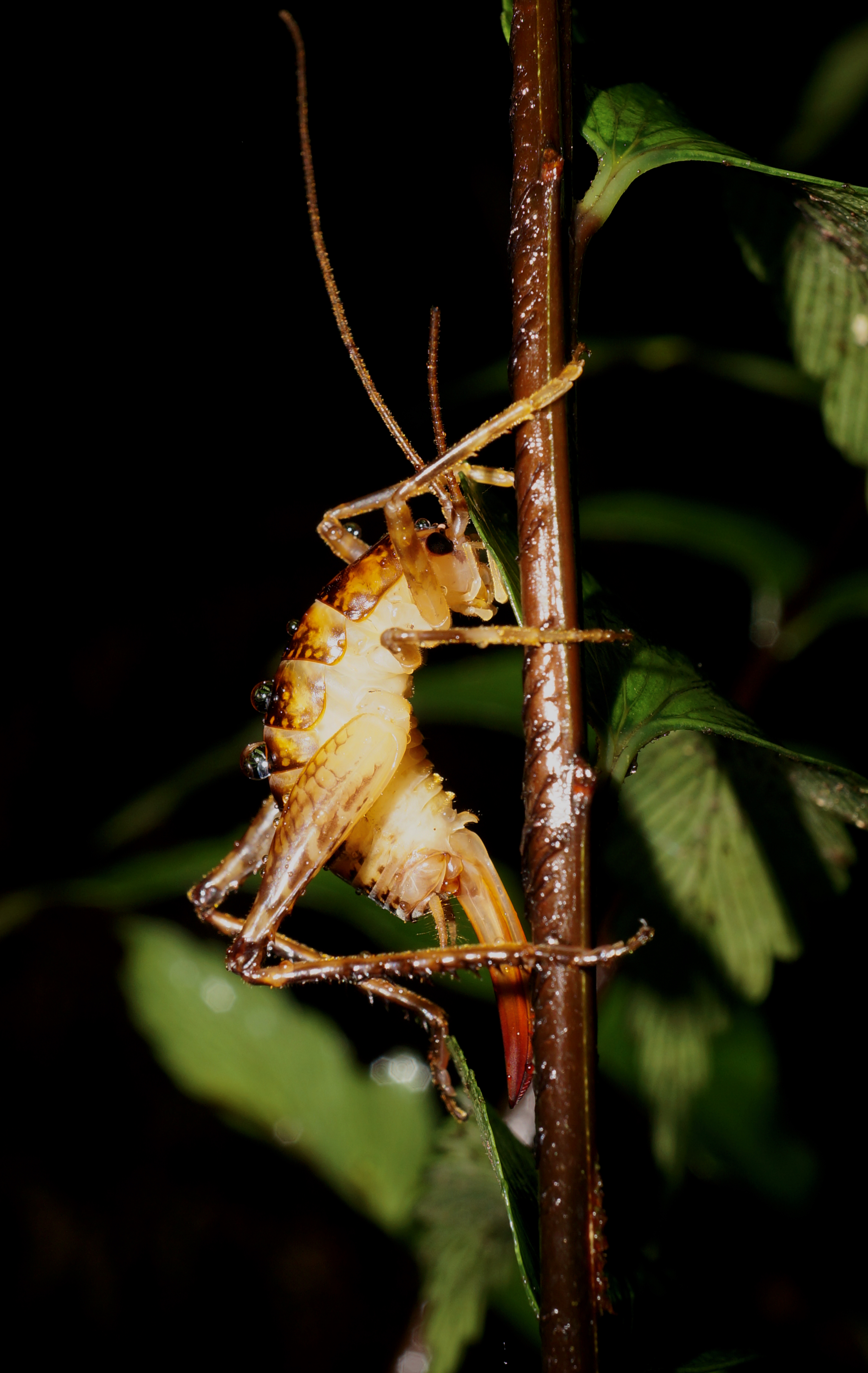

Scientific classification
- Kingdom: Animalia
- Phylum: Arthropoda
- Class: Insecta
- Order: Orthoptera
- Suborder: Ensifera
- Family: Rhaphidophoridae
- Genus: Talitropsis
- Species: T. sedilloti

Binomial name
- Talitropsis sedilloti Bolívar, 1882

= Talitropsis sedilloti =

Species of insect

Talitropsis sedilloti is a species of flightless wētā, in the family Rhaphidophoridae (cave crickets, cave wētā, or camel crickets), endemic to Aotearoa New Zealand. This species is common in forests throughout New Zealand and during the day can be found hiding in holes in tree branches.

== Description ==
Cave wētā have extra-long antennae and long, slender legs. They lack hearing organs (tympana), but they are sensitive to ground vibrations, this is enabled by pads on their feet. Specialised hairs on the cerci and organs on the antennae are also good at capture of low frequency vibrations in the air.

Talitropsis sedilloti adults range from about 14mm for females to 18mm for males. Adults are a shiny, pale orange brown. Their hind tibiae have two rows of prominent spines on either side down most of the length. This feature helps distinguish them from other tokoriro (cave wētā) as others species have very fine spines. Juveniles are darker in colour with an evident yellow diamond on the dorsal abdominal surface.

== Taxonomy ==
Talitropsis is a New Zealand genus of wētā belonging to the family Rhaphidophoridae, all species have small to medium bodies and live in forests not caves. Two species are found only on the Chatham Islands, New Zealand.

The species T. sedilloti was first described by Ignacio Bolívar in 1882.

== Biology ==
=== Life history ===
The life cycle of T. sedilloti is usually complete in about two years. They need eight months to hatch from eggs from the time of laying, however, time span of the juveniles and adult is hard to assess. December and January is the optimal time of the year that adult start to be observed at night foraging. Mating has been observed in April.

Female T. sedilloti have long ovipositors used for laying eggs into soft wood, moss and soil. Palps and ovipositor are used to find a suitable spot, as the correct texture are a prerequisite for egg-laying, they are particularly choosy on the spot, often testing before selecting. There are maximum of two eggs laid in the same spot. Oviposition reach its peak between April and June, and hatching usually peak between December and January. Compound eyes of the embryo become visible through the chorion during embryo development stage. A dark brown cap appear at the vegetal pole of the egg just before hatching. Sometime the chorion becomes transparent and the embryo can be seen quite clearly through it. The number of pre-adult instars is variable both inter- and intraspecifically.

=== Diet ===
Cave wētā have small mouths. Although they are arboreal, they do not appear to utilise leaves as a nutrient source to any extent, instead, they eat fungi, algae and lichens growing on trees and rocks. Although protein is a preferred meal, they are not known to attack, but scavenge on any dead insects that they come across.

Some observations suggests that cave wētā "lick" native slugs, however, this is not officially reported. The licking behaviour in cave wētā is suspected as they can gain moisture and some nutrients from the slime.

=== Sexual dimorphism ===
The adult female is easily distinguished from the male by having a long, scimitar-like ovipositor projecting from the posterior end of its abdomen.

== Distribution and habitats ==
=== Habitats ===
Talitropsis sedilloti is widely spread throughout New Zealand's main islands and several small islands. In general cave wētā love damp, dark, cool environments, and are only active at night. Talitropsis sedilloti are found in rain forest habitats where they hide during the day in hollow tree branches using the same sort of tree holes as used by tree wētā (Hemideina).

Talitropsis sedilloti is common in various forest types on both main islands of New Zealand, and occurs in low numbers on Stewart Island.

Juvenile T. sedilloti are observed in the leaf litter of mixed podocarp-coastal forests and at night on tree trunks of tree-ferns (whekī, Dicksonia squarrosa), miro (P. ferruginea), kāmahi (Pterophylla racemosa), and Hall's tōtara (Podocarpus laetus). Adults are found on trunks of miro (Prumnopitys ferruginea) and rimu (Dacrydium cupressinum), both of the tree species are characterised by thick flaky bark that can provide ideal microhabitats for these wētā.

=== Distribution ===
Click here and here to be redirected to see the distribution of T. sedilloti in New Zealand.(update on distribution is currently under investigation).

Talitropsis sedilloti is wide spread across mainland New Zealand and genetic studies using mtDNA have found intraspecific genetic distance within this species are as high as 4.4% (max).
