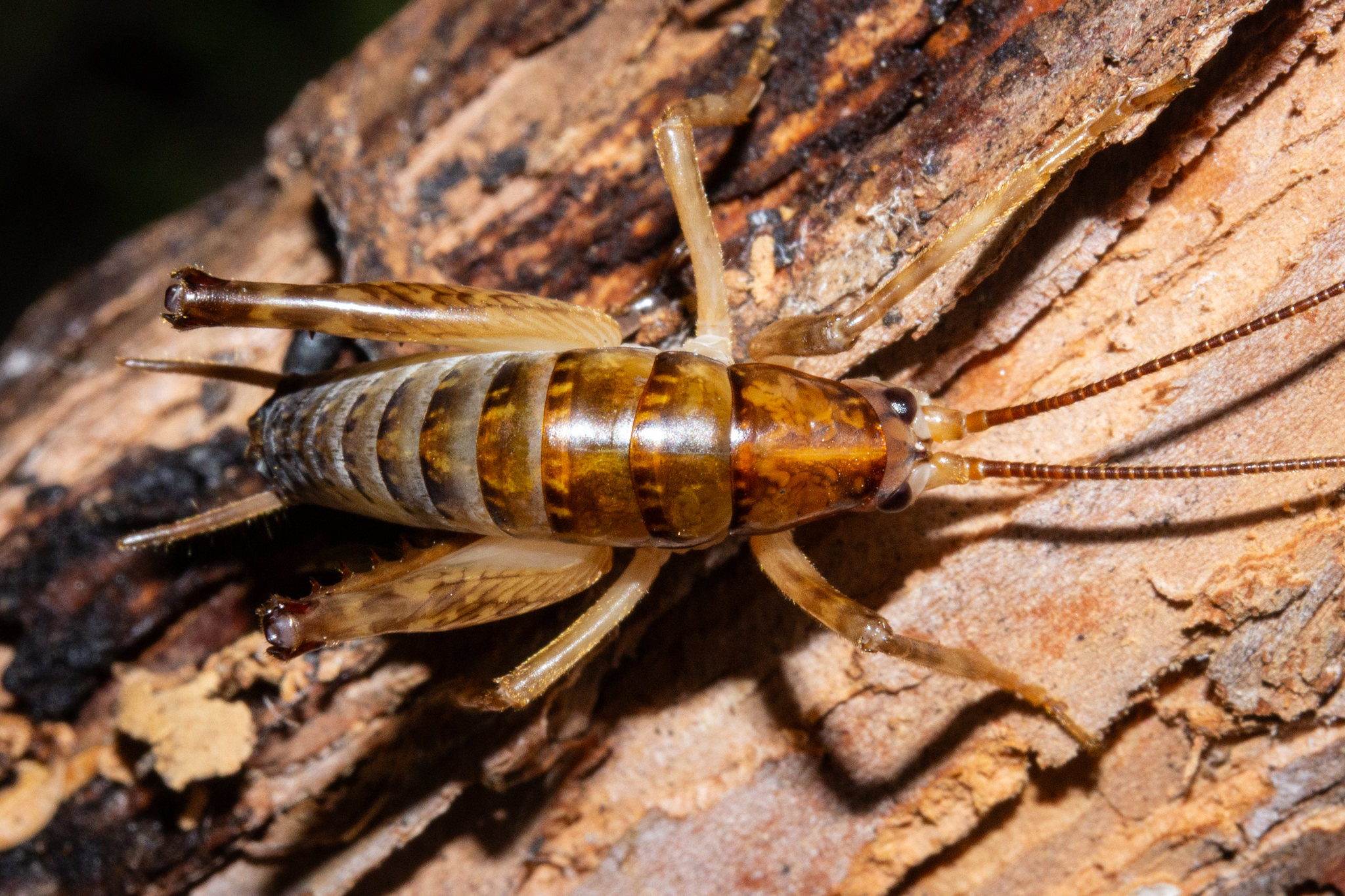
- Talitropsis sedilloti

Scientific classification
- Kingdom: Animalia
- Phylum: Arthropoda
- Clade: Pancrustacea
- Class: Insecta
- Order: Orthoptera
- Suborder: Ensifera
- Family: Rhaphidophoridae
- Subfamily: Macropathinae
- Genus: Talitropsis; Bolívar, 1882

Species
- See text.

Synonyms
- Talitropis Brunner von Wattenwyl, 1888 (missp.); Gammaroparnops Alfken, 1901

= Talitropsis =

Genus of orthopteran insects

Talitropsis is a genus of cave wētā in the family Rhaphidophoridae, endemic to New Zealand, and containing six described species. Two Talitropsis species are found only on the Chatham Islands.

== Species ==
- Talitropsis chopardi (Karny, 1937)
- Talitropsis crassicruris Hutton, 1897
- Talitropsis irregularis Hutton, 1897
- Talitropsis megatibia Trewick, 1999
- Talitropsis poduroides (Walker, 1871)
- Talitropsis sedilloti Bolivar, 1883
