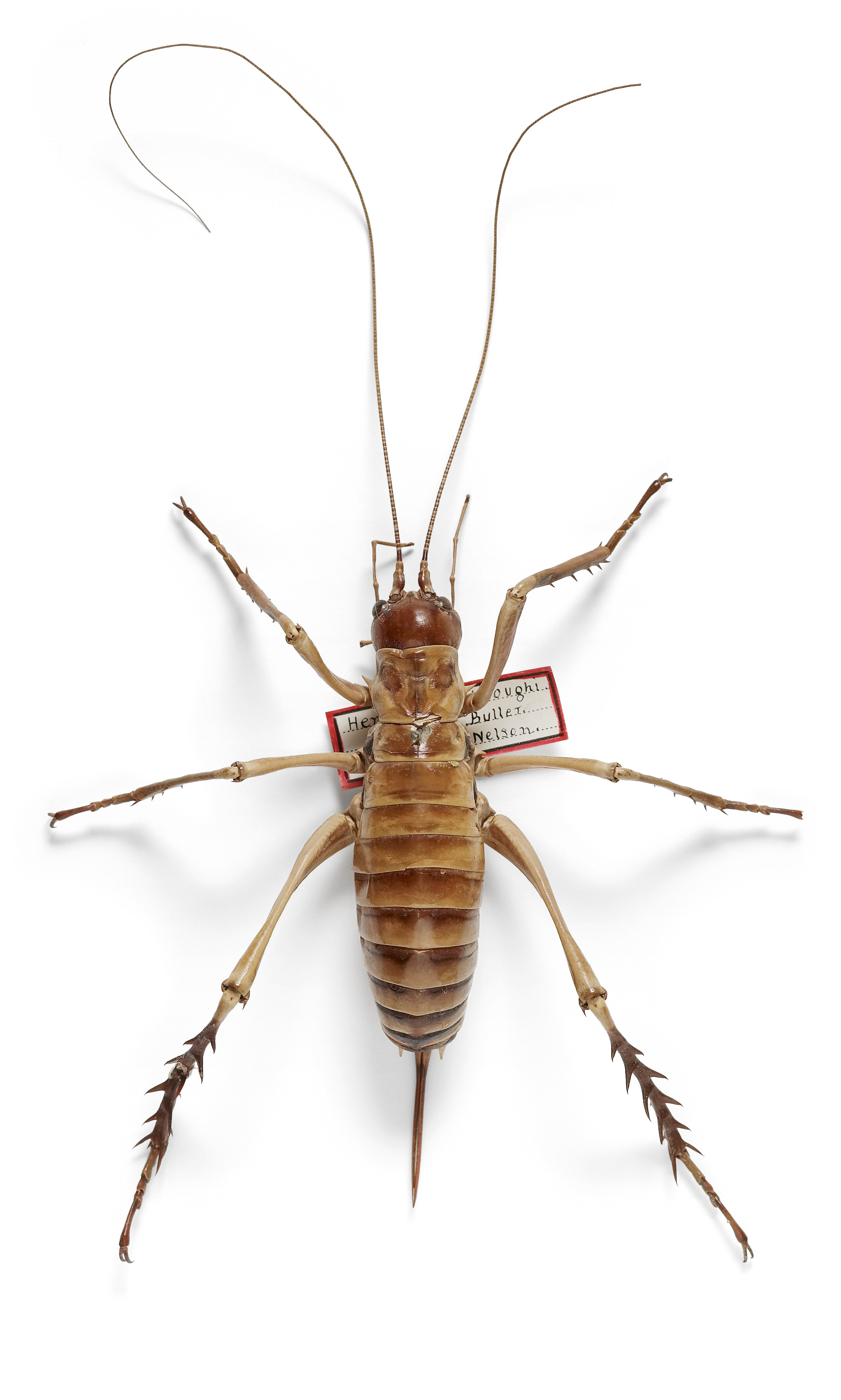

Scientific classification
- Domain: Eukaryota
- Kingdom: Animalia
- Phylum: Arthropoda
- Class: Insecta
- Order: Orthoptera
- Suborder: Ensifera
- Family: Anostostomatidae
- Genus: Hemideina
- Species: H. broughi

Binomial name
- Hemideina broughi (Buller, 1896)
- Observations of Hemideina broughi from iNaturalist (as of 2024).

= Hemideina broughi =

Species of Orthoptera

Hemideina broughi is a species of wētā endemic to New Zealand. Because this species is only found in forest of the west coast of South Island its common name is West Coast Bush wētā.

== Description ==
The largest of the seven species of Hemideina, adults are about 85mm long. Males do not have elongated mandibles and both sexes lack stridulatory ridges. Body has almost uniform glossy orange-brown colour.

== Range ==
Hemideina broughi is found in North west South Island New Zealand between the Tasman Mountains and Greymouth in native temperate rain forests at elevations up to 1100 m above sea level.

== Habitat ==
Only found in native forests with high rain fall. Hemideina broughi shelters inside tree branches or hollow trunks of living beech (Nothofagus sp.) trees during the day. Tunnels are made by wood-boring beetle or moth larvae but can be enlarged by the weta. Eats leaves and plant tissue including seeds and bark at night.

== Ecology ==
Little is known of this nocturnal forest species. Some of the only published observations of the diet and behaviour of this species come from the original species description which includes notes from Mr J. Brough. Before preservation as a holotype specimen, an adult female was observed in a glass pickle-jar by Mr Brough who wrote "..[she] became quite lively by night, and at times emitted a chattering kind of sound." Instead of ridges making a stridulatory file, H. broughi have patches of minute pegs on their abdominal tergites. As male H. broughi do not have large heads compared to females it is thought they do not have the same polygamous mating system seen in other Hemideina species.

== Etymology ==
The genus Hemideina was named to indicate smaller size of these wētā species compared to the sister genus Deinacrida ['Hemi' meaning part]. This species was named for Mr J. Brough who collected the first specimen.

== Taxonomy ==
Described by Buller in 1896 in the genus Deinacrida. Moved to the genus Hemideina by Hutton in 1900. In 1978 Ramsey and Bigelow suggested H. broughi should be in its own genus but phylogenetic evidence suggests the combining of the 7 Hemideina species to join the 11 Deinacrida species would remove current paraphyletic relationships of this group.
