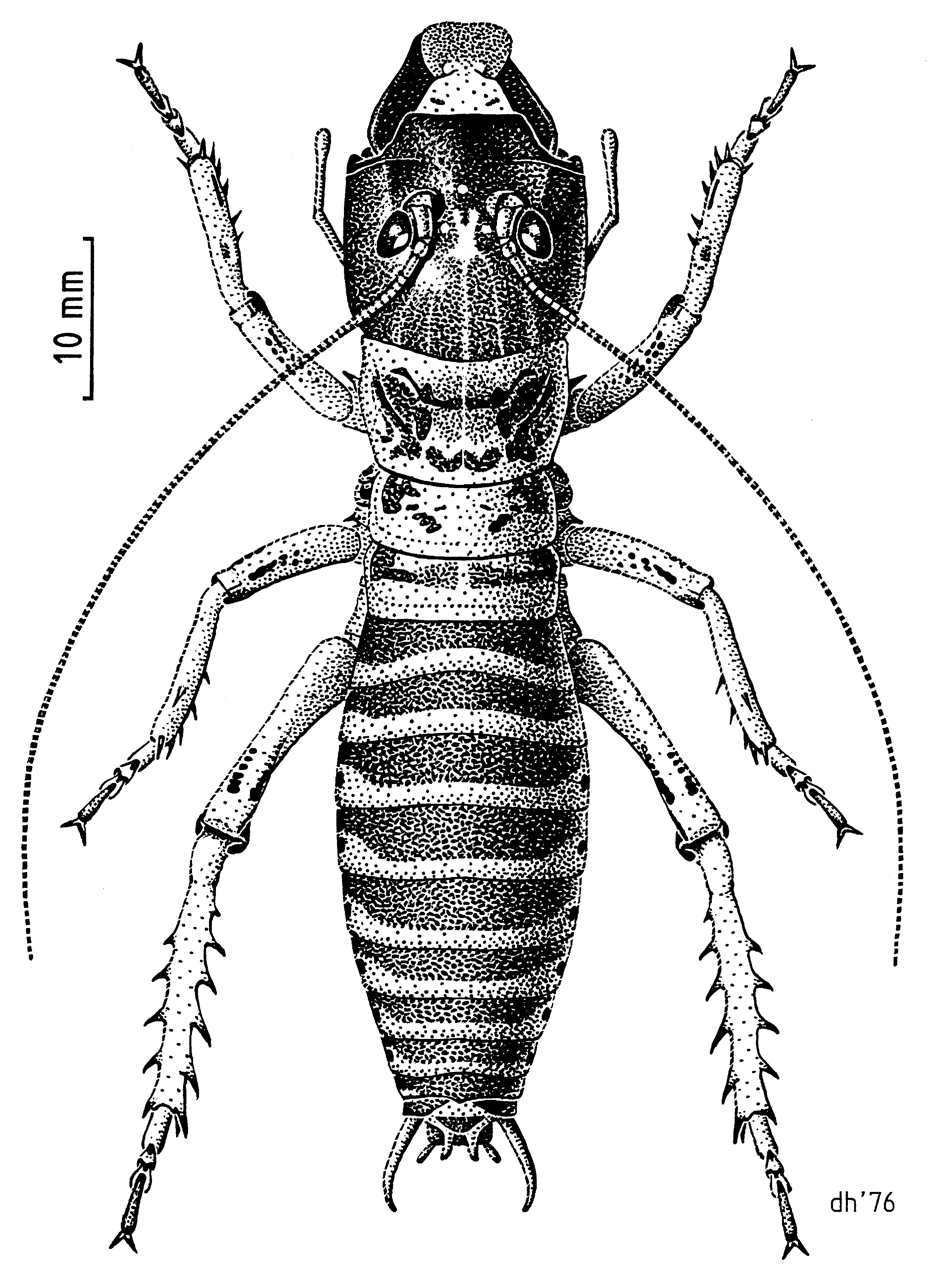
- Illustration by Des Helmore

Scientific classification
- Kingdom: Animalia
- Phylum: Arthropoda
- Clade: Pancrustacea
- Class: Insecta
- Order: Orthoptera
- Suborder: Ensifera
- Family: Anostostomatidae
- Genus: Hemideina
- Species: H. maori

Binomial name
- Hemideina maori (Pictet & Saussure, 1891)

= Hemideina maori =

Species of orthopteran insect

Hemideina maori, also known as the mountain stone wētā, is a wētā of the family Anostostomatidae. They are a large, flightless, nocturnal orthopteran endemic to New Zealand. Mountain stone wētā are long lived and are found on many central mountain ranges in New Zealand's South Island.

== Taxonomy ==
Hemideina maori was first described in 1891 by Swiss Entomologists Alphonse Pictet and Henri de Saussure.

== Habitat and distribution ==
Unlike other Hemideina species H. maori occupy an alpine habitat. They are found at high elevation (above the tree line) of the South Island of New Zealand. They have been found above 1500 metres above sea level (m.a.s.l) with a lower limit of 1100m.a.s.l, from the Kaikōura Ranges south to the Rock and Pillar range in Otago. They use cavities under rock slabs ('tors') broken from schist outcrops as retreats during the day. Tors are separated by alpine meadows with no rocks and therefore are assumed to have no wētā, causing population fragmentation.

The mountain wētā do not move far during their lifetime, and are exposed to high winds and low temperatures all year round.

== Diet ==
Studies of mountain stone wētā frass have found that they eat many plant species such as tussock grass (Poa colensoi) and moss (Polytrichum juniperinum) as well as invertebrates. This species of wētā is both a scavenger and predator of insects. Most plant species preferred by H. maori have a higher than average lipid content, for example the shrub Celmisia viscosa, the cushion plants Anisotome imbricata and Raoulia hectori.

== Morphology ==
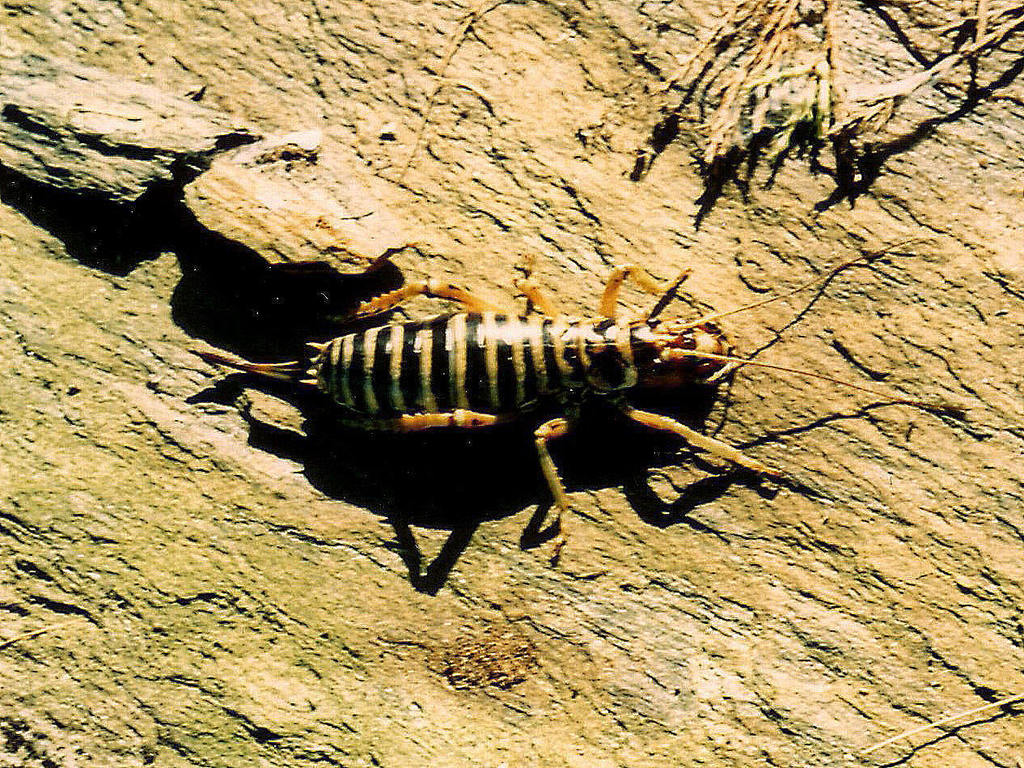
Female

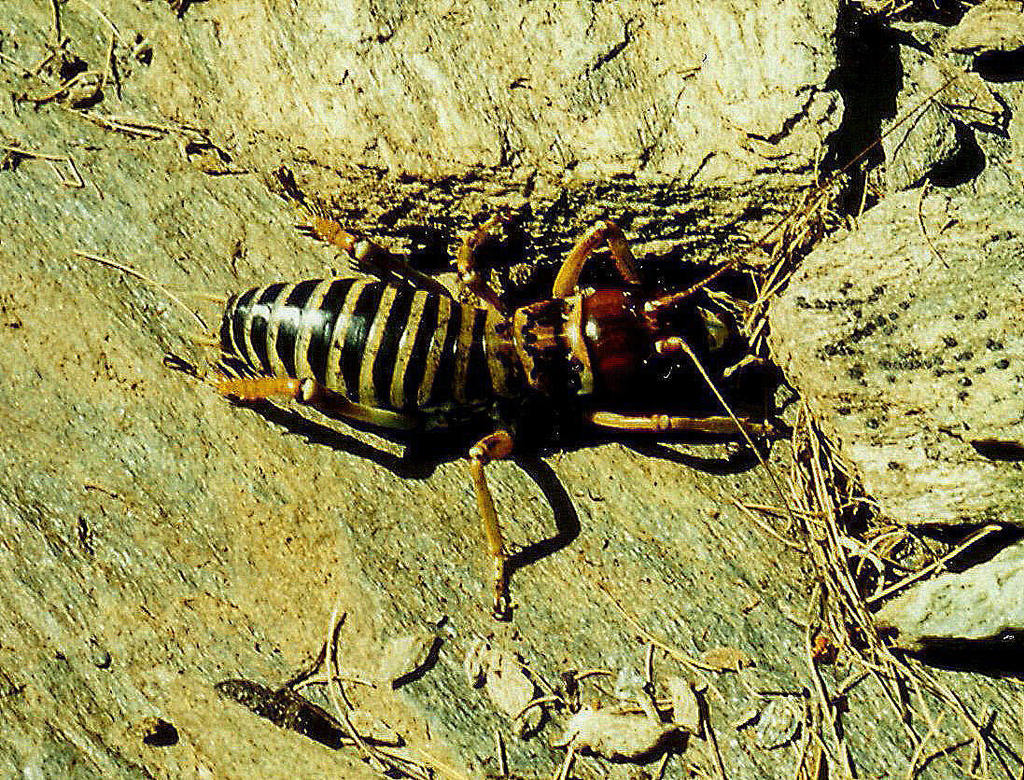
Male

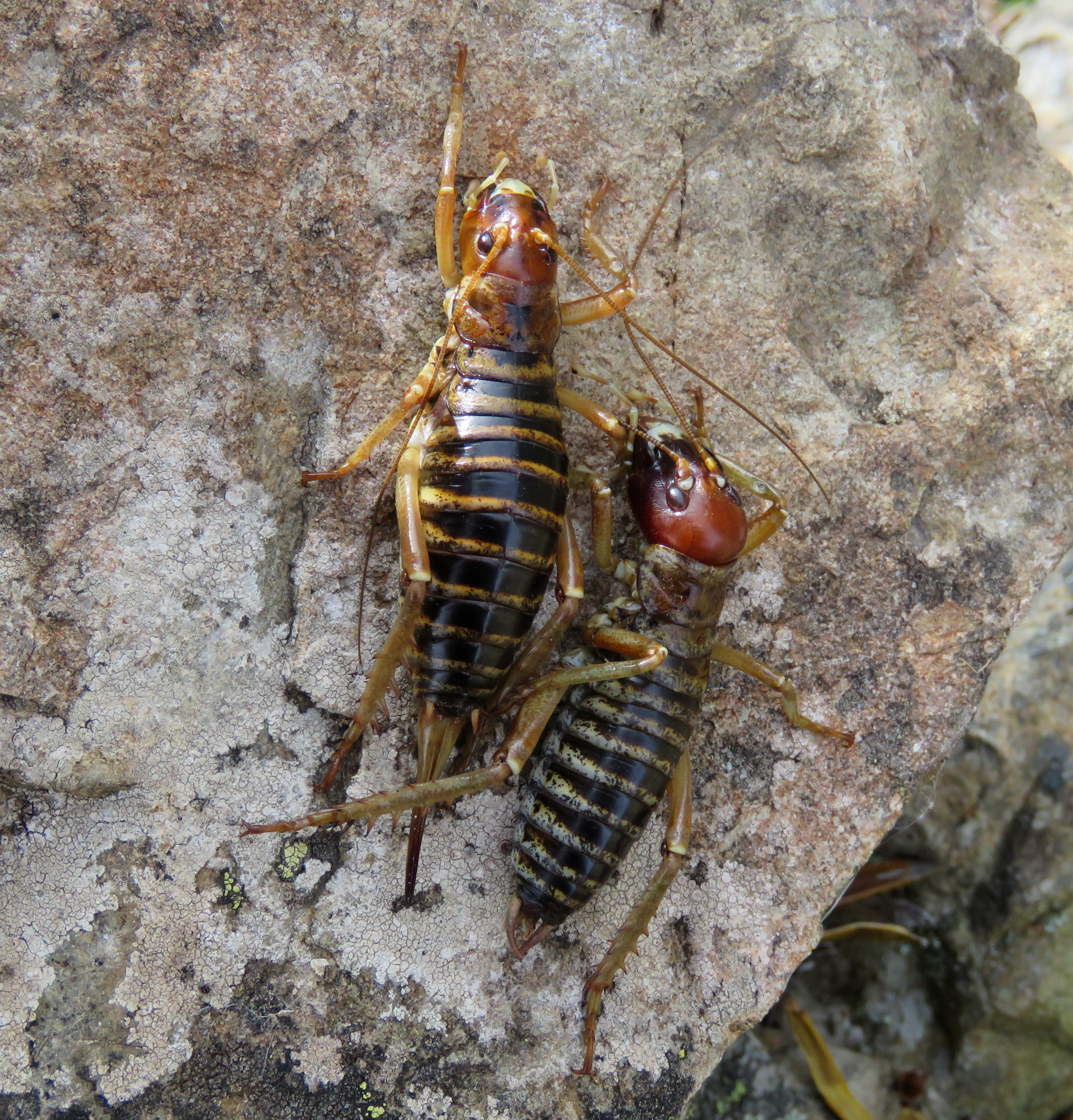
Female and male mountain stone weta at Korowai / Torlesse Tussocklands Park

Hemideina maori are a large wētā with a body length of approximately 6 cm. The length of the male and female tibia do not differ (mean of tibia length = 18.6 +/- 0.17 mm for each sex). Both males and females have directional asymmetry in mandible length with the left mandible being longer than the right (Males: median 0.53mm, range: 0.01 to 1.37mm, n=48. Females: median 0.49mm, range 0 to 1.21mm, n= 35).

Males can show extreme dimorphism in weaponry that appears to be a result of sexual selection of male-male combat for access to females. These males have mandibles that tend to be two times longer and their head can be up to 1.5 times wider than those of females with a similar tibia length.

=== Body colour ===
A hybrid zone between the two colour forms (melanic and yellow) of Hemideina maori has been studied in the Rock and Pillar mountain range and. It was found that both the black and yellow lineages in the Rock and Pillar range do not form a monophyletic group suggesting that H. maori exhibited a colour polymorphism before the separation of the two Rock and Pillar lineages occurred.

== Physiology ==
=== Adaptation to montane environment ===
Cuticular water loss (CWL) and respiratory water loss (RWL) were found to be reduced in montane wētā compared to lowland wētā, suggesting that montane Hemideina have an increased desiccation resistance via decreased water loss. It was also found that the black colour morphs lost less total water than yellow colour morphs driven by a decrease in CWL in the black morphs.

=== Freeze tolerance ===
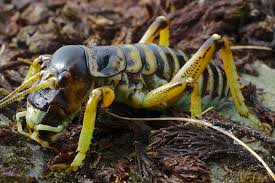
Frozen mountain stone wētā in the Southern Alps, New Zealand

Mountain stone wētā can survive being frozen solid over winter and are estimated to be inactive for at least 5 months of the year. During winter H. maori are often immobile with ice crystals on their cuticle. When touched the individuals appear to be frozen solid. On warm days however, they can be found thawed and active under rocks. While the wētā are immobile they are in a state of suspended animation, they can survive up to 17 days in temperatures of about -10 °C. At temperatures below -10 °C, approximately 85% of their body water is crystallized, one of the highest ice contents known for any animal.

During winter, their haemolymph contains low molecular weight cryoprotectants such as amino acids, especially proline (up to about 100 mM) and the disaccharide trehalose. These substances are synthesised during autumn and their concentration decreases again during spring and summer (proline concentration decreases to about 10 mM during summer). The amino acids and sugars presumably help to decrease the ice content colligatively; however, they probably also have a direct protective effect on membranes and proteins via direct interaction or by modifying the water layer with the closest proximity to the molecules.

== Behaviour ==
Unlike other Hemideina species, H. maori is a species of tree wētā, which spends most of its time in tors on the ground. Just like other tree wētā species however, H. maori leave their refuges at night to forage and oviposit in soil.

To defend against predators, mountain stone wētā will often "play dead". They lie still for a short time on their back, with legs splayed, claws exposed and jaws wide open ready to scratch and bite. This behaviour is often accompanied with regurgitation when grabbed by a predator which can act as an irritant or toxin.

=== Predators ===
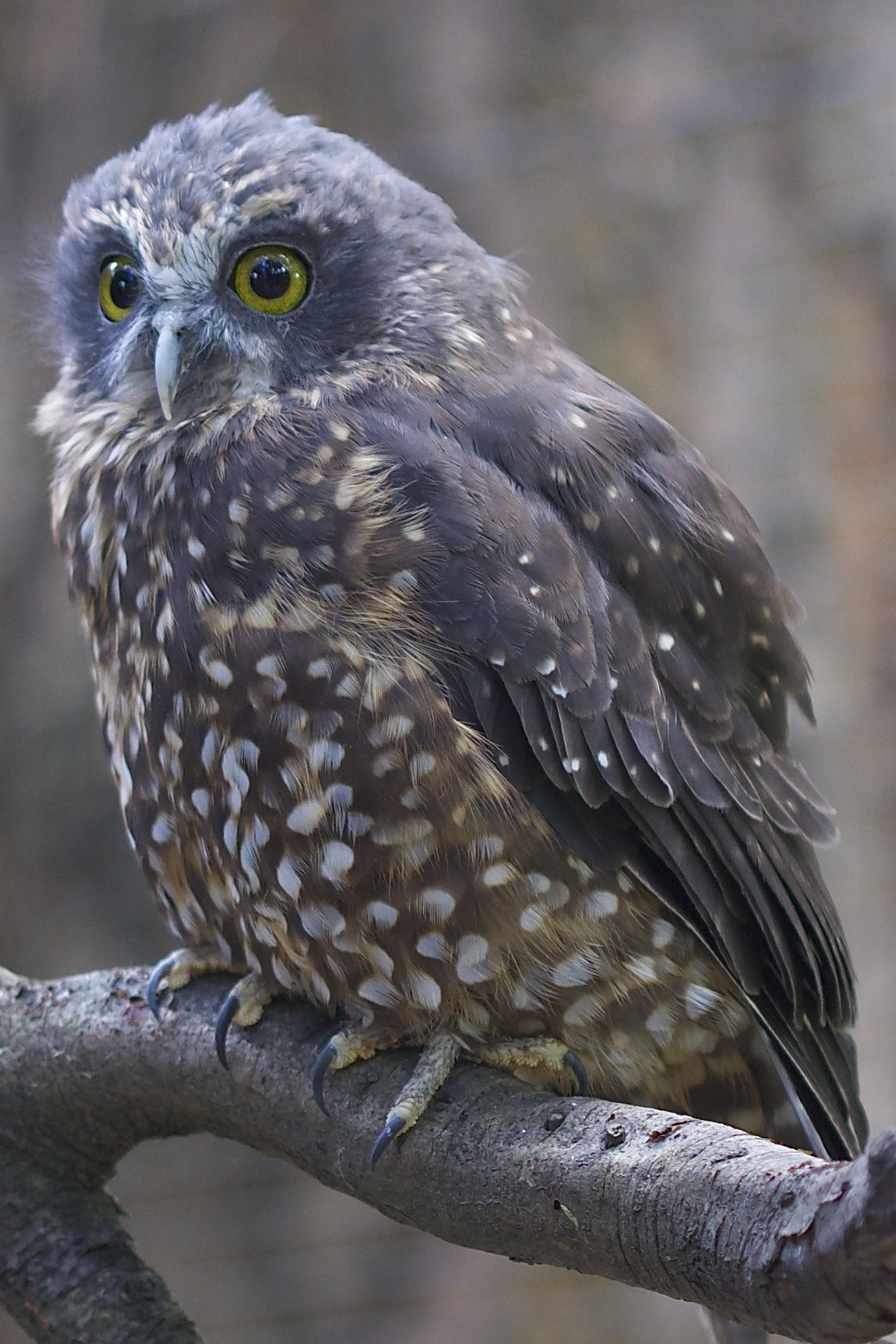
Morepork (ruru), native nocturnal bird and potential predator to the mountain stone wētā

Potential mammalian predators of the mountain stone wētā appear to be present in either very low numbers or not at all at elevations above 1100 m.a.s.l, suggesting that rats, possums, cats and other potential mammalian predators have not dispersed into this area in large numbers.

This means that native nocturnal predators of the mountain stone wētā are most likely to be reptiles such as geckos and skinks or birds such as ruru (morepork).

== Breeding ==
Mountain stone wētā have a several year life cycle, they may take at least 4 years to reach sexual maturity with some individuals surviving at least 4 breeding seasons.

The H. maori mating season tends to end before the alpine cold period, (autumn is March & April in the southern hemisphere) this is a time when the days are cold and the wētā are inactive in their rock refuges.

Males cohabit with many females, (up to seven females with a single male) males that live with a large number of females have a higher chance of mating success. Adult males have larger heads and elongated mandibles compared to adult females (secondary sexual dimorphism). H. maori have a harem-polygynous mating system, copulation tends to occur within their rock refuges with the ability to quickly mate with any female who returns to the retreat. Males use their large mandibles in male-male fights for access to harems.

To copulate males move alongside females making their attennal in contact with her, they then curve their abdomen towards the females terminalia. Copulation tends to last for a mean of 3.1 minutes.

== Conservation status ==
Populations of this widespread species are found on most ranges on the Southern Alps and therefore it is not considered to be at risk of extinction. A mark-recapture study conducted by Leisnham et al. where 480 adult mountain stone wētā were marked, over the period of three field seasons (between November 1997 and April 2000) 72% of marked individuals (n = 229) were recaptured at least once.
