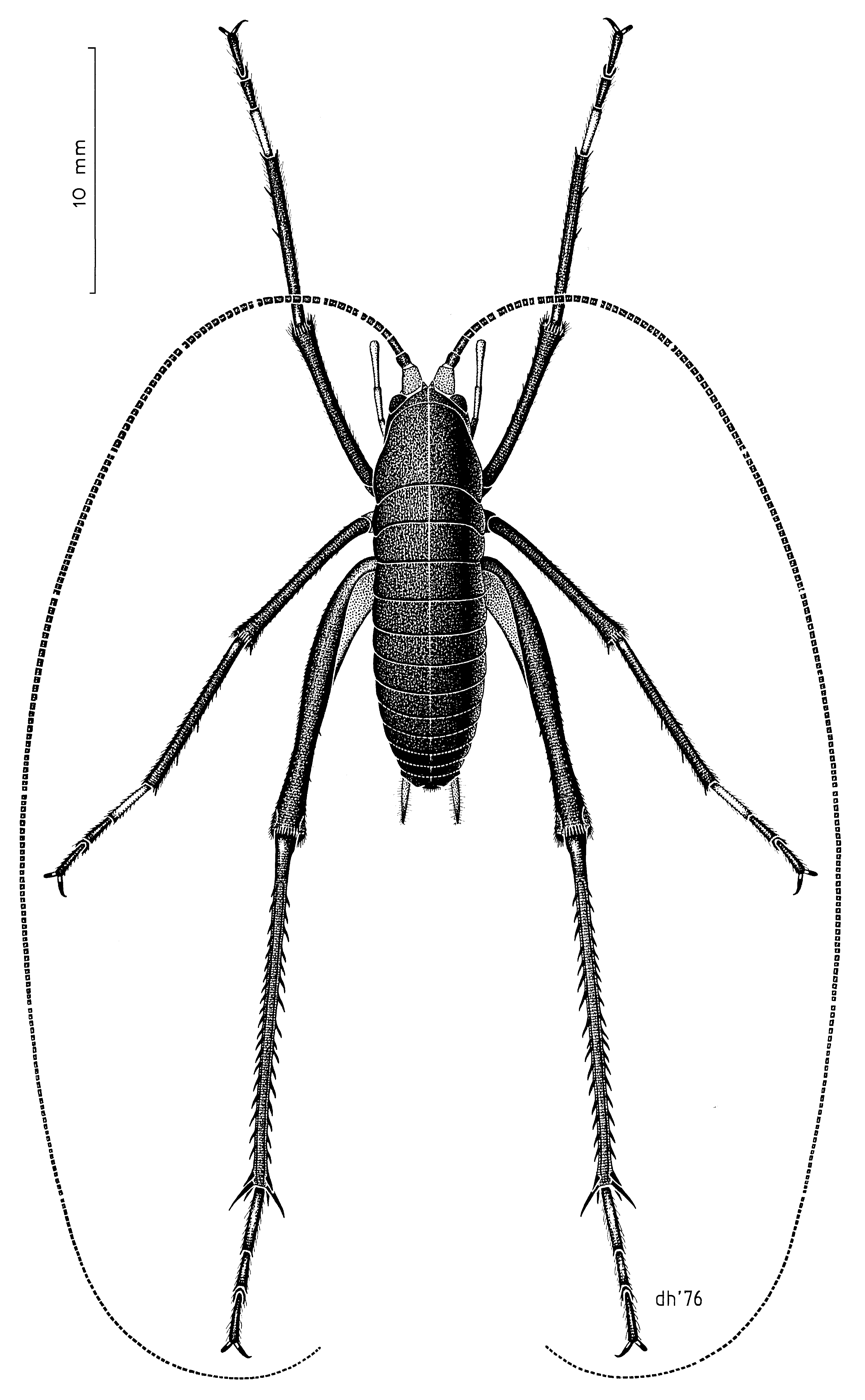
- Pharmacus montanus

Scientific classification
- Kingdom: Animalia
- Phylum: Arthropoda
- Clade: Pancrustacea
- Class: Insecta
- Order: Orthoptera
- Suborder: Ensifera
- Family: Rhaphidophoridae
- Subfamily: Macropathinae
- Genus: Pharmacus; Pictet & Saussure, 1891

Species
- See text

= Pharmacus =

Genus of orthopteran insects

Pharmacus is a genus of cave wētā in the family Rhaphidophoridae, endemic to New Zealand. All species are alpine adapted and found at high elevations in the South Island. They live among rocks on high mountain ridges, often well above glaciers and vegetation. Pharmacus has a geographical range that extends from Nelson south to central Otago and Fiordland. They are small insects with a body length of approximately 14-20mm. In this genus, females are larger than males. All species exhibit dark brown to black pigmentation of the body and legs. They have a dense clothing of setae and a serrated ovipositor. When active they are lively jumpers. For example, Pharmacus montanus is known as the Mount Cook flea because of its habit of leaping out of rock crevices on to mountain climbers.

== Taxonomy ==
The genus Pharmacus was first described by Pictet and de Saussure in 1893 as a monotypic taxon. Pharmacus montanus was thought to be the only species in this genus. However, three species were added to the genus by Richards in 1972. These were Pharmacus brewsterensis (now moved to another genus), P. chapmanae and P. dumbletoni (both synonyms). Six new species and three new subspecies have been recently added in 2022 by Hegg, Morgan-Richards and Trewick. The six new species are Pharmacus concinnus, P. cristatus, P. notabilis, P. perfidus, P. senex, P. vallestris. Three new subspecies of Pharmacus cochleatus have been described and are known as P. cochleatus rawhiti, P. cochleatus fiordensis, P. cochleatus nauclerus.

== Morphology ==
Pharmacus montanus: body length = 14mm, ovipositor = 9.9mm, foreleg = 18.7mm, mid leg = 18.7mm, hind leg = 28.6mm.

== Diet ==
Little is known about the diet of these alpine insects. Pharmacus are mainly herbivorous and have been observed feeding on rock lichen. However, they probably prey on small invertebrates. Pharmacus may also feed on the rich red algal growth that coats snow-fields during the summer season.

== Distribution ==
Pharmacus are alpine specialists and are found throughout the mountain ranges of New Zealand's South Island. They are only found above the tree line and into the nival zone. They have been sighted at 1300m above sea level or higher. On Mt Cook P. montanus has been recorded at 3400 m asl. Different species of Pharmacus have varied distributions throughout the South Island. Pharmacus montanus and Pharmacus cochleatus are the two most widespread species, occupying the length of the Southern Alps from Fiordland to Kahurangi National Park.

== Species ==
- Pharmacus cochleatus (Karny, 1935)
- Pharmacus concinnus Hegg, Morgan-Richards &Trewick 2022
- Pharmacus cristatus Hegg, Morgan-Richards &Trewick 2022
- Pharmacus montanus Pictet & Saussure, 1891
- Pharmacus notabilis Hegg, Morgan-Richards &Trewick 2022
- Pharmacus perfidus Hegg, Morgan-Richards &Trewick 2022
- Pharmacus senex Hegg, Morgan-Richards &Trewick 2022
- Pharmacus vallestris Hegg, Morgan-Richards &Trewick 2022
