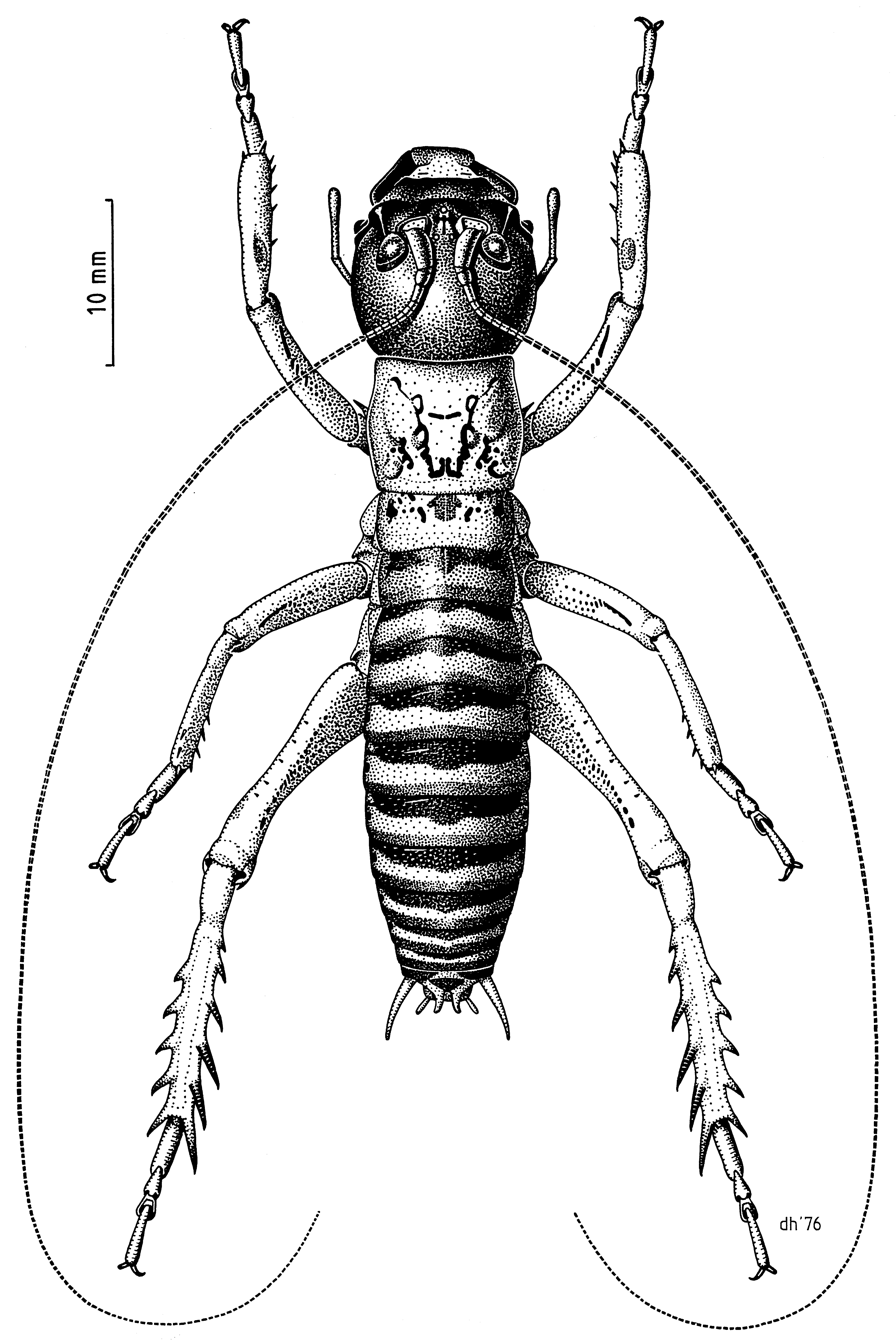
- Hemideina femorata, male illustrated

Scientific classification
- Kingdom: Animalia
- Phylum: Arthropoda
- Class: Insecta
- Order: Orthoptera
- Suborder: Ensifera
- Family: Anostostomatidae
- Genus: Hemideina
- Species: H. femorata

Binomial name
- Hemideina femorata (Hutton, 1898)

= Hemideina femorata =

Species of orthopteran insect

Hemideina femorata, the Canterbury tree wētā (Māori, pūtangatanga) is a flightless nocturnal insect from the order Orthoptera and the genus Hemideina, it is endemic to Canterbury, New Zealand, on the South Island.

== Description ==
The tree wētā in New Zealand are large flightless nocturnal insects. Wētā have three main sections to their body, the head, thorax and abdomen. Tree wētā are often distinguished by their sizable hindlegs, strong jaws, tusks on the males, their glossy and hard exoskeleton and their size. Wētā often have antennae twice as long as their bodies, which are used to help it feel its way in the dark and safely navigate. Structurally male tree wētās have a larger head than the females, which may make up 40% of their body length. The females have a long spike on their back called an ovipositor which is used for egg laying. Male wētā have two cerci (a pair of short tapering sensory feelers) projecting at their rear and they do not have an ovipositor. Males have a proportionately smaller abdomen than the females and "their reproductive structures are internal, apart from two pairs of tiny lobes beneath the cerci." H. femorata is distinguished by its colour patterns, cream-yellow banding which extends around and across the abdomen. Each segment of the abdomen has reddish dark-brown marks. On the prothorax and on the hind femora there are irregular black markings. Some H. femorata have a retrolateral apical spine present on the hind femora.

== Distribution ==
=== Natural global range ===
There are other insects around the world which are related to the wētā family. There are "long-legged Cave crickets or Camel crickets" which look similar to wētā and are found in places such as Australia, Chile, Europe and Asia. Although there are other species worldwide which are similar, wētā are only found in New Zealand. The Canterbury tree wētā is endemic and is restricted to the Canterbury region of New Zealand.

=== New Zealand range ===
Hemideina femorata is limited to a particular range in the Canterbury region. The distribution of this wētā extends along the east coast from Kaikōura to Geraldine and can be found as far west as Nelson. The Kanuka forests near Kaikōura are a common place where these wētā can be found. A study in 1997 examined the distribution of Hemideina femorata on Banks Peninsula and found that all species were found below an altitude of 450 m, with a majority of them located on north-east facing slopes.

=== Habitat preferences ===
Wētā are often found in vacated tunnels in branches or trunks of trees, which are often initially made by other insects. These tunnels are termed as galleries, as the tree wētās are said to enlarge and clean their tunnels. A report in 2001 has been reported that H. femorata occupy a wide variety of trees, including kanuka (Kunzea ericoides), lacebark (Hoheria angustifolia), mahoe (Melicytus ramiflorus), broadleaf (Griselinia littoralis) tree fuchsia (Fuchsia excorticata) and beech (Fuscospora solandri). The research by Townsend in 1997 found that H. femorata were found significantly more within kanuka. Field and Sandlant in 2001 reported that H. femorata was found in at an altitude of 320 m or less within kanuka even if the kanuka extended above 320 m. Tree wētā tend to show a preference for living in groups.

== Life cycle/phenology ==
Adult wētā hardly ever move more than a few metres from their home base. The exception to this is when the females climb down from the tree to lay their eggs. Females tend to need extra protein before laying their eggs, so they will eat their "old skins which shed during their lifetime." "They will also eat other dead or injured insects, and even their own kind at these times."

There is a very simple courtship ritual for the Hemideina femorata. The male initiates the interaction, this involves "the general antennation (touching with the antenna), palpation and genital probing of females prior to attempting to copulate". (Field, 2000).

The tree wētā tends to lay her eggs in autumn (around April or May). This is a good time, because in autumn, the soil is softer, due to rainfall, than in the summer. The female tree wētā travels to the ground to find the right location and soil for her to lay her eggs. The female uses the tip of her ovipositor to check the soil to make sure it is a suitable place for the eggs. When she finds the right location she "lifts the end of her abdomen and twists the ovipositor vertically down, she pushes it as deep as it will go into the soil." The depth of her ovipositor in the soil is about 15 mm.

The females do not lay their eggs all at once, they do this periodically over several weeks. Females can lay up to 200 eggs over two or three months. Each set of eggs is placed in a different location. The female can lay one egg or up to six eggs in a group. Wētā "eggs are about 6mm long and 1.5mm thick". They lie in the soil over winter and they tend to hatch in about October or November. It is very important to have damp soil during this incubation period, so they eggs can hatch more successfully. The tiny wētā splits the egg shell and makes its way up to the surface of the soil. Juvenile wētā are called nymphs, they live in the foliage of bush and trees for the first few months. "They feed on the same food as the adults, mainly leaves but with some insect prey if they can find them."

A study conducted by Stringer showed that adult tree wētā sex ratios change with the time of year. From November to January there are less than 15% more females than males, as the year goes on the males numbers drop drastically until early March where then only females remain. The reproductive cycle of the wētā is incomplete, this is known as an incomplete metamorphosis. Tree wētās mainly go through nine instars.

Moulting occurs after a wētā has lost weight and been relatively inactive tending not to drink or eat for 4 to 14 days. When moulting occurs, most wētā hang from a branch or substrate and moult out of their exuviae and fall to the ground where they rest for a while. Hemideina femorata moults up to six times. Males come to adulthood sooner than females and have to wait for mating until the females are ready. Mating often happens in the galleries at night. H. Femorata will mate for up to 6 minutes. Females will mate only after they weigh four times as much initially and then will lay eggs/oviposit at round roughly 100 days after courtship. The eggs of most wētā are laid in vertically the soil. Females are said to guard their eggs and occasionally guard the first-instar nymphs too.

The juvenile wētā shed their skin many times before they become an adult. This is essential because the exoskeleton of the wētā does not stretch. Canterbury tree wētā are inactive one to two days before they moult and they become paler. Most wētā shed their skin at night. "When moulting, most weta hang head downward with their hind legs, and sometimes also their middle legs, firmly hooked on to vegetation." The ecdysis begins when abdomen of the wētā starts undergoing rhythmic contractions. The thorax and anterior of the abdomen are usually the first to emerge from the old skin. The antenna is commonly the last to be pulled out. The wētā tend to eat their old cuticle (skin) after they shed it. Tree wētā moult at least 10 times over two years. Hemideina femorata reach maturity when they are two years old, they can then go on to live up to 12 years in captivity.

== Diet and foraging ==
The head of the wētā is used for feeding and receiving information about its environment. Hemideina femorata tend to be vegetarians and can survive eating leaves or carrots but if a freshly killed caterpillar, grasshopper or even another wētā comes across their path, they will eat it. These wētā eat "fresh leaves off a variety of trees shrubs and weeds", they are particularly fond of karamu (Coprosma robusta) and mahoe (Melicytus ramiflorus).

== Predators, parasites and diseases ==
Major threats to wētā include short tailed bats, birds, and reptiles such as lizards and tuatara. Birds that tend to eat this wētā include the kiwi, robin, tomtit and ruru. Other introduced threats include cats, hedgehogs, rats and mustelids. Another major threat is humans as they tend to destroy the habitat of the wētā. These wētā tend to avoid locations where spiders are present. The Canterbury tree wētā also have a tendency to avoid slugs.

== Other information ==
To produce sound and communicate the Hemideina femorata moves "the sides of the abdomen against the inner surface of the hind-legs with these legs stationary in the resting position." This rapid stutter is produced by two kinds of movement. One movement involves the "contraction and slight upward curling of the abdomen" of the wētā. The other movement is the wētā "raising and lowering its abdomen." "Both of these are used as eviction or move-along calls by male and female weta" the second movement is used mostly by adult wētā.

The adult Hemideina femorata seem ready to mate with other adult tree wētā, not just their own species. Some of these wētā share the same tree with other wētā such as Hemideina ricta. This attempt to mate can cause a hybridisation in the species of wētā. This only occurs with wētā found in the same geographical location, such as both wētā naturally living in the south or the north. For example, a Wellington tree wētā (Hemideina crassidens) male was placed with a Canterbury tree wētā (Hemideina femorata) female, there was no attempt of them mating at all. It is mostly tree wētā who have been found to mate like this. Hybrids of Hemideina femorata and Hemideina ricta have been found in an overlap of habitat areas in the east of the Akaroa Harbour and Banks Peninsula.

Culturally the Māori people of New Zealand would refer to the wētā as "the devil who comes in the night" Also the Māori would use them as a source of protein.
