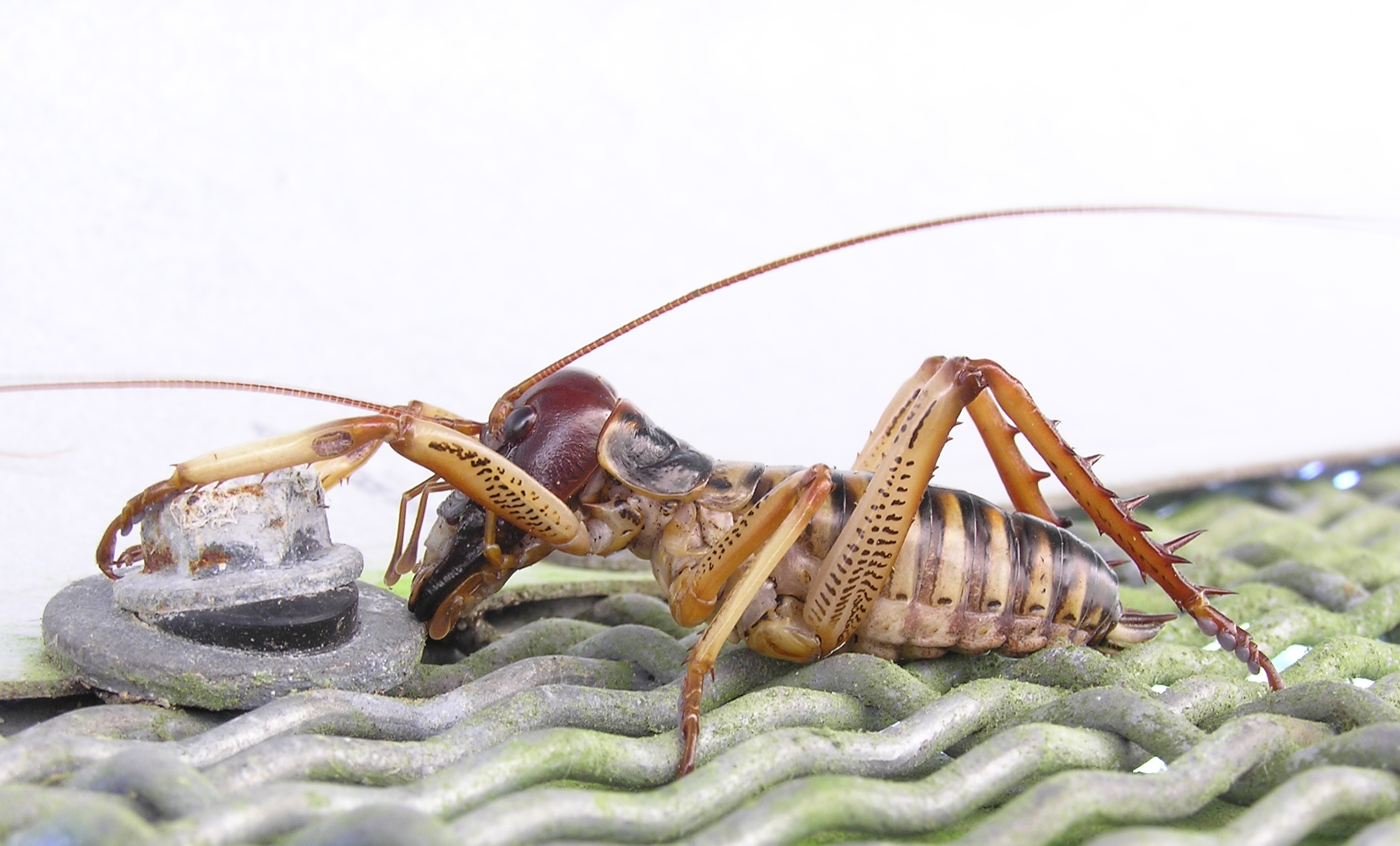
- Male Wellington tree wētā, Hemideina crassidens

Scientific classification
- Kingdom: Animalia
- Phylum: Arthropoda
- Clade: Pancrustacea
- Class: Insecta
- Order: Orthoptera
- Suborder: Ensifera
- Family: Anostostomatidae
- Subfamily: Deinacridinae
- Genus: Hemideina; Walker, 1869

Species
- See text.

= Tree wētā =

Genus of orthopteran insects

Tree wētā (pūtangatanga) are insects in the genus Hemideina of the family Anostostomatidae. The genus is endemic to New Zealand. There are seven species within the wētā genus Hemideina, found throughout the country except lowland Otago and Southland. Because many pūtangatanga species are common and widespread they have been used extensively in studies of ecology and evolution.

== Habitat ==
Tree wētā are commonly encountered in forests and suburban gardens throughout most of New Zealand. They are up to 40 mm (1.6 in) long and most commonly live in holes in trees formed by beetle and moth larvae or where rot has set in after a twig has broken off. The hole, called a gallery, is maintained by the wētā and any growth of the bark surrounding the opening is chewed away. They readily occupy a preformed gallery in a piece of wood (a "wētā motel") and can be kept in a suburban garden as pets. A gallery might house a harem of up to ten adult females and one male.

== Behaviour ==
Tree wētā are nocturnal and arboreal, hiding in hollow tree branches during the day and feeding at night. Their diet consists of leaves, flowers, fruit and small insects. Males have larger heads and stronger jaws than females, though both sexes will stridulate and bite when threatened.

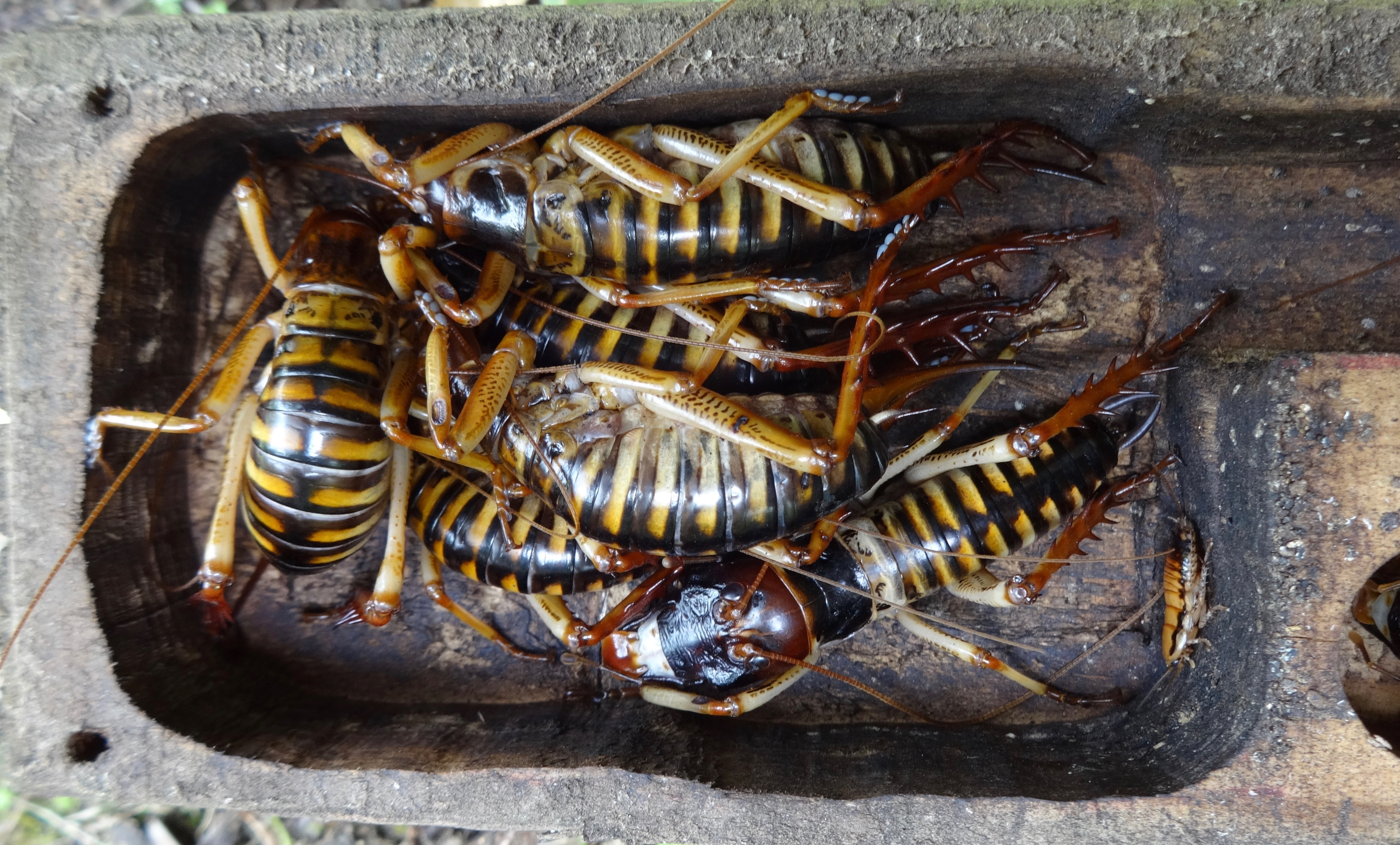
Harem of five adult females and one male Wellington tree wētā (Hemideina crassidens)

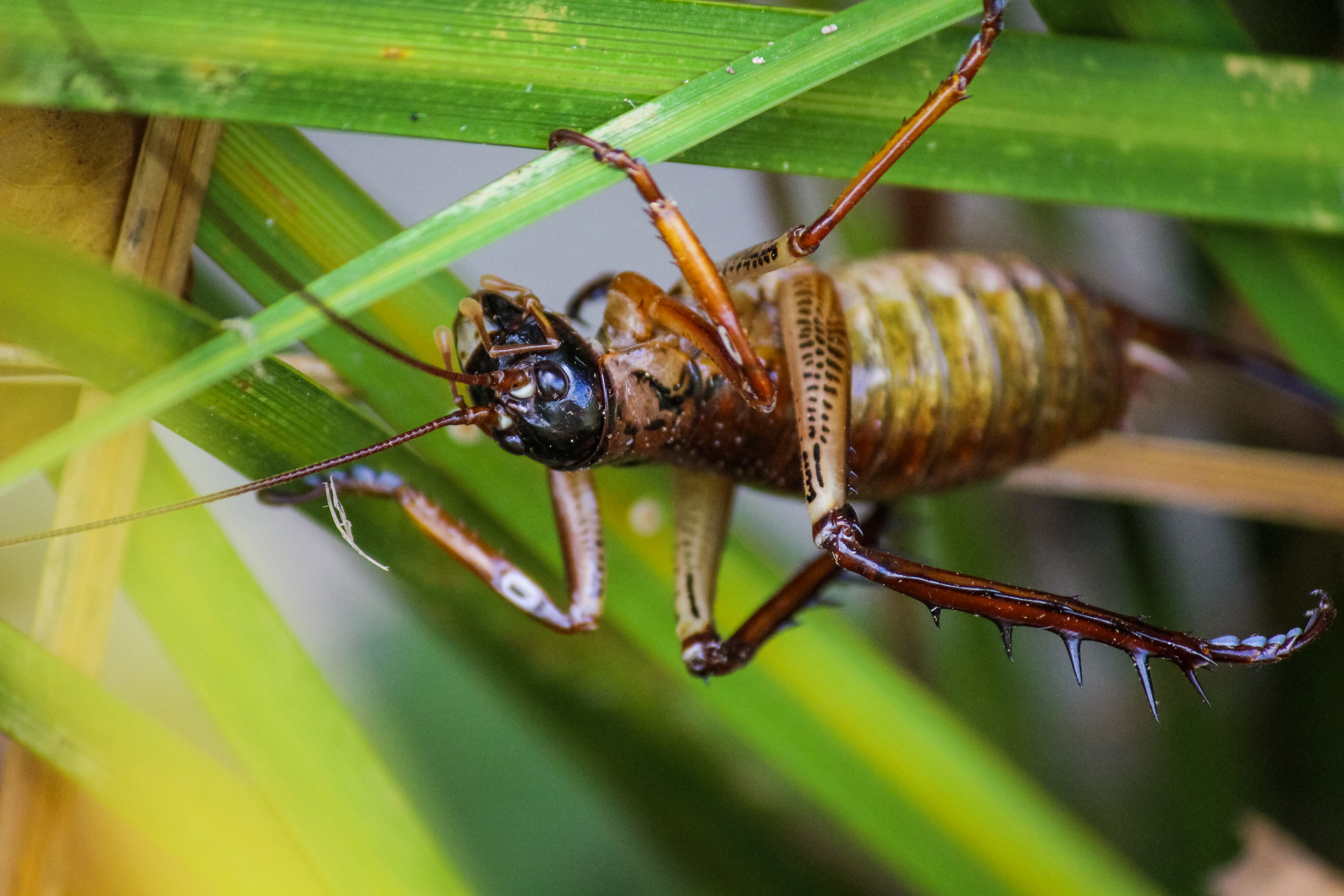
Auckland tree wētā

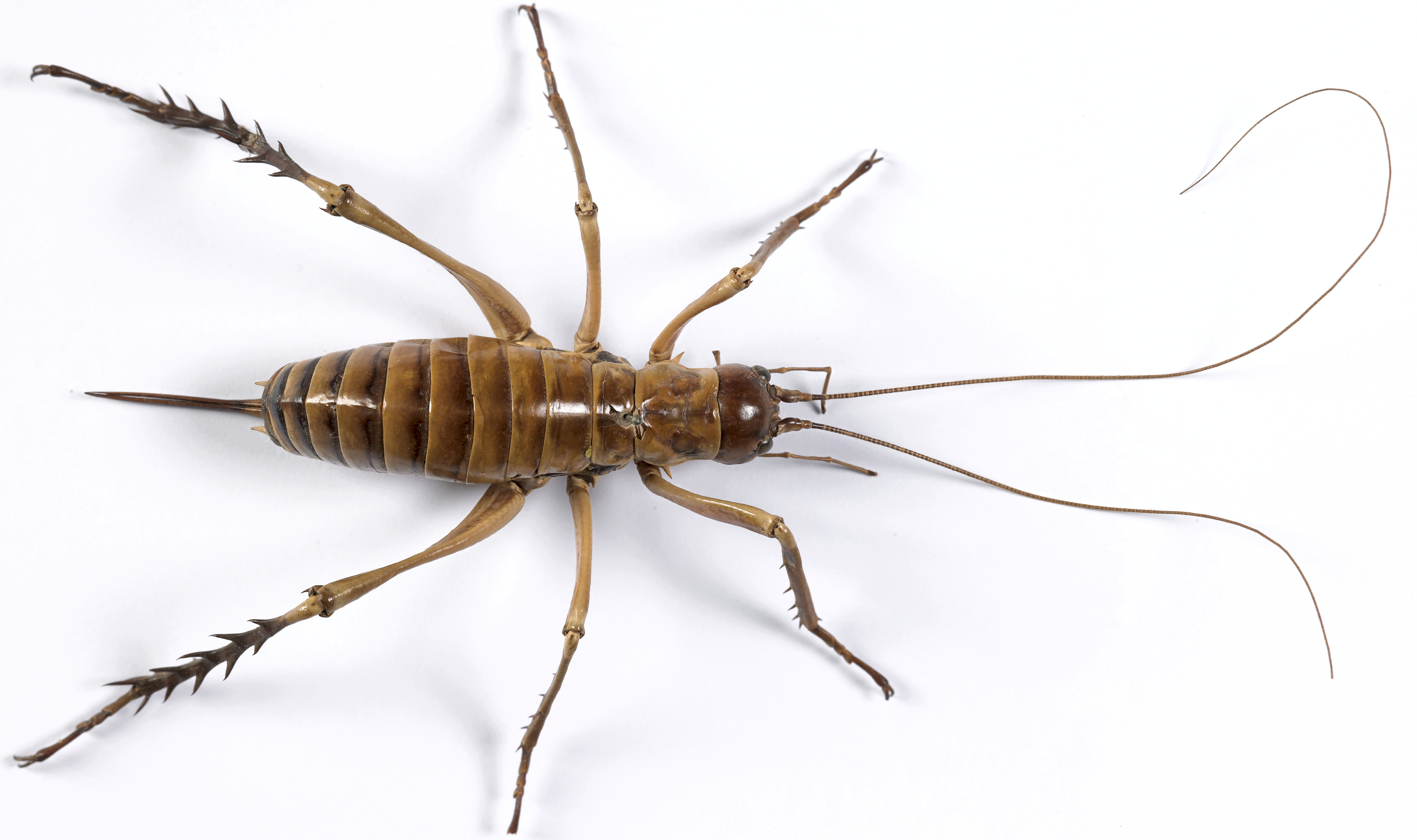
West Coast bush wētā

== Species ==
The seven species of tree wētā are:

Auckland tree wētā, Hemideina thoracica (White, 1846)
Also known as tokoriro; found throughout the North Island apart from the Wellington-Wairarapa region. Within this range are nine chromosome races and there are five hybrid zones where six of these races meet.
Hawke's Bay tree wētā, Hemideina trewicki Morgan-Richards, 1995
Hawke's Bay.
Wellington tree wētā, Hemideina crassidens (Blanchard, 1851)
Wellington, the Wairarapa, the northern part of the South Island, and the West Coast. They have been the subject of studies of coevolution, sexual selection, hybridisation and range shifts.
Canterbury tree wētā, Hemideina femorata Hutton, 1898
Marlborough and Canterbury.
Mountain stone wētā, Hemideina maori (Pictet & Saussure, 1891)
The drier areas of the central South Island high country, living above the treeline. This species abandoned life in the forest millions of years ago in favour of crevices and cavities under rocks.
Banks Peninsula tree wētā, Hemideina ricta Hutton, 1898
A rare species only found on Banks Peninsula.
West Coast bush wētā, Hemideina broughi (Buller, 1896)
Overlaps with the Wellington tree wētā in Nelson and the northern West Coast.

The three North Island tree wētā species are closely related but each has a distinctive set of chromosomes (karyotype). When the territories of species overlap, as with the related species H. femorata and H. ricta on Banks Peninsula, they may interbreed, although offspring are sterile.
