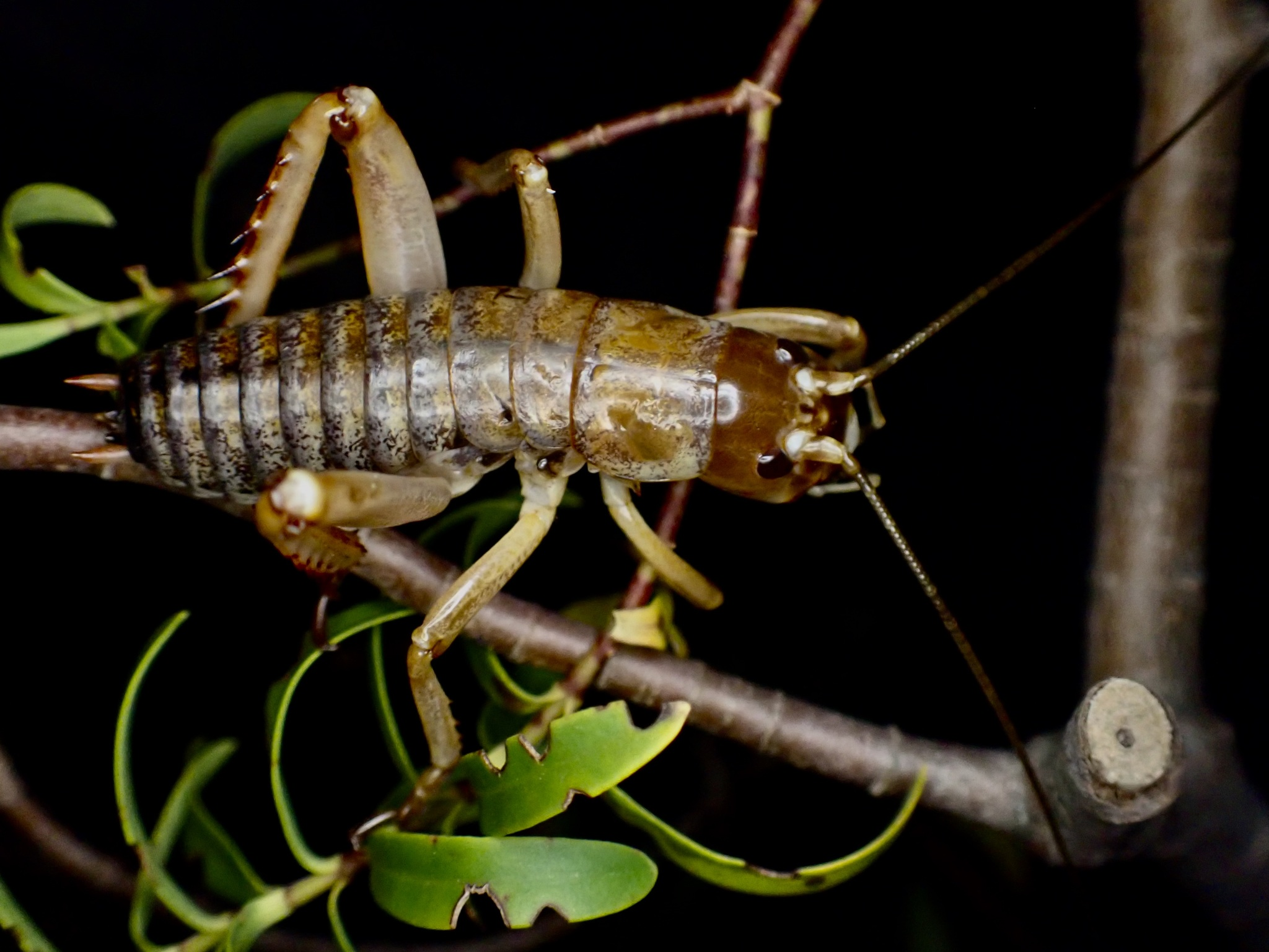
- Hemideina ricta photographed by Mike Bowie

Conservation status
- Naturally Uncommon (NZ TCS)

Scientific classification
- Kingdom: Animalia
- Phylum: Arthropoda
- Clade: Pancrustacea
- Class: Insecta
- Order: Orthoptera
- Suborder: Ensifera
- Family: Anostostomatidae
- Genus: Hemideina
- Species: H. ricta

Binomial name
- Hemideina ricta Hutton, 1896

Synonyms
- Hemideina tibiata (Salmon, 1950)

= Hemideina ricta =

Species of orthopteran insect

Hemideina ricta, known as the Banks Peninsula tree wētā, is an insect that is endemic to New Zealand. Its known range covers the eastern side of the Banks Peninsula.

== Taxonomy ==
Hemideina ricta Hutton, 1896 is a tree wētā that belongs to the insect order Orthoptera. It was originally described by Frederick Hutton in 1896, based on two male and five female specimens from Banks Peninsula and South Canterbury. It is one of seven species in the endemic New Zealand genus Hemideina.

== Identification ==
Adults of the Banks Peninsula tree wētā are red-brown in colour, can weigh 4–6 g, and can reach 40–55 mm in length. The head of the mature male Banks Peninsula tree wētā is much larger and darker than that of females or juvenile males, with large mandibles used to fight other males.

Hemideina ricta is similar to H. femorata, which is also found in forest fragments on Banks Peninsula. These two species can be differentiated using the number of stridulatory ridges on their abdomen. Hemideina ricta has more than 20 ridges in total, whereas H. femorata has fewer than 16 stridulatory ridges. Although these two species will share the same daytime refuge holes, only a few F1 hybrids have been found, and no gene flow has been detected between the two species.

== Geographic distribution and habitat ==
The Banks Peninsula tree wētā is found only on the east side of the Banks Peninsula. Its range is limited to a roughly 200 km^{2} area between Pigeon Bay and Akaroa Harbour, from about 400-800 m above sea level.

Hemideina ricta live in cavities in trees, wooden posts, crevices, rocks, fallen tree logs, or the ground. Some of the tree species it may occupy include lacebark, kanuka, broadleaf, mahoe and five finger. Hemideina ricta generally does not dig its own cavities, instead occupying those previously made by the larvae of other insects, preferably those with a small opening (wide enough for its head to fit through) with a large space inside. There can be several wētā living in a single cavity at any one time, often a single male with several females.

== Conservation status ==
Under the New Zealand Threat Classification System, this species is listed as "Naturally Uncommon" with the qualifiers of "Range Restricted". It has been assessed as this classification in the 2010, 2014 and 2022 reports.

== Life cycle ==
In captivity mating has been reported during the months of April, May and November. Mating generally occurs within cavities at night, as this is where large groups of females gather to seek out shelter. Adult males fight over ownership of cavities and therefore the females within those cavities, males with larger mandible gapes often come out on top in these battles.

After mating the female needs to leave the safety of the tree cavity in order to descend to the ground to lay her eggs. Oviposition, the process of egg laying, typically takes place at night. The female first examines the ground before laying her eggs by placing her ovipositor into it, she then moves on to a nearby patch of land and repeats this process laying more eggs. This procedure takes around 10–15 minutes. The eggs are around 5.9 mm in length, weigh around 16.8 mg and are black, brown or white in color. The eggs can take several months to mature , generally hatching during spring.

When eggs hatch they often do not do so all at once, a single batch of eggs may take up to two weeks to all hatch. A female wētā can lay up to 200 eggs in her lifetime. It can take up to two years for juvenile wētā to mature and reach adulthood, during this time the young wētā must moult several times as it grows. It does this by anchoring itself to a tree branch using its hind legs and hanging upside down. The thorax is the first part of the body to emerge, followed by the abdomen, then the head, next the front and hind legs are pulled out and the antennae emerge last. The Banks Peninsula tree wētā goes into a period of inactivity for a few days before moulting and lightens in colour. After moulting the wētā consumes its exuviae, the shed skin, as this is made up of valuable proteins.

Adults live for several months and in some cases up to a year.

== Behaviour ==
The Banks peninsula tree wētā is a nocturnal omnivore that eats small insects, as well as the leaves of trees, shrubs, and in some cases, pasture species.

The main predators of Hemideina ricta are non-native mammal rodents, specifically rats and possums, which are pests throughout mainland New Zealand and some offshore islands. Native predators include diurnal birds such as kākā and weka, and nocturnal birds such as kiwi and owls. Other less common predators include tuatara and short-tailed bats.

== Gallery ==
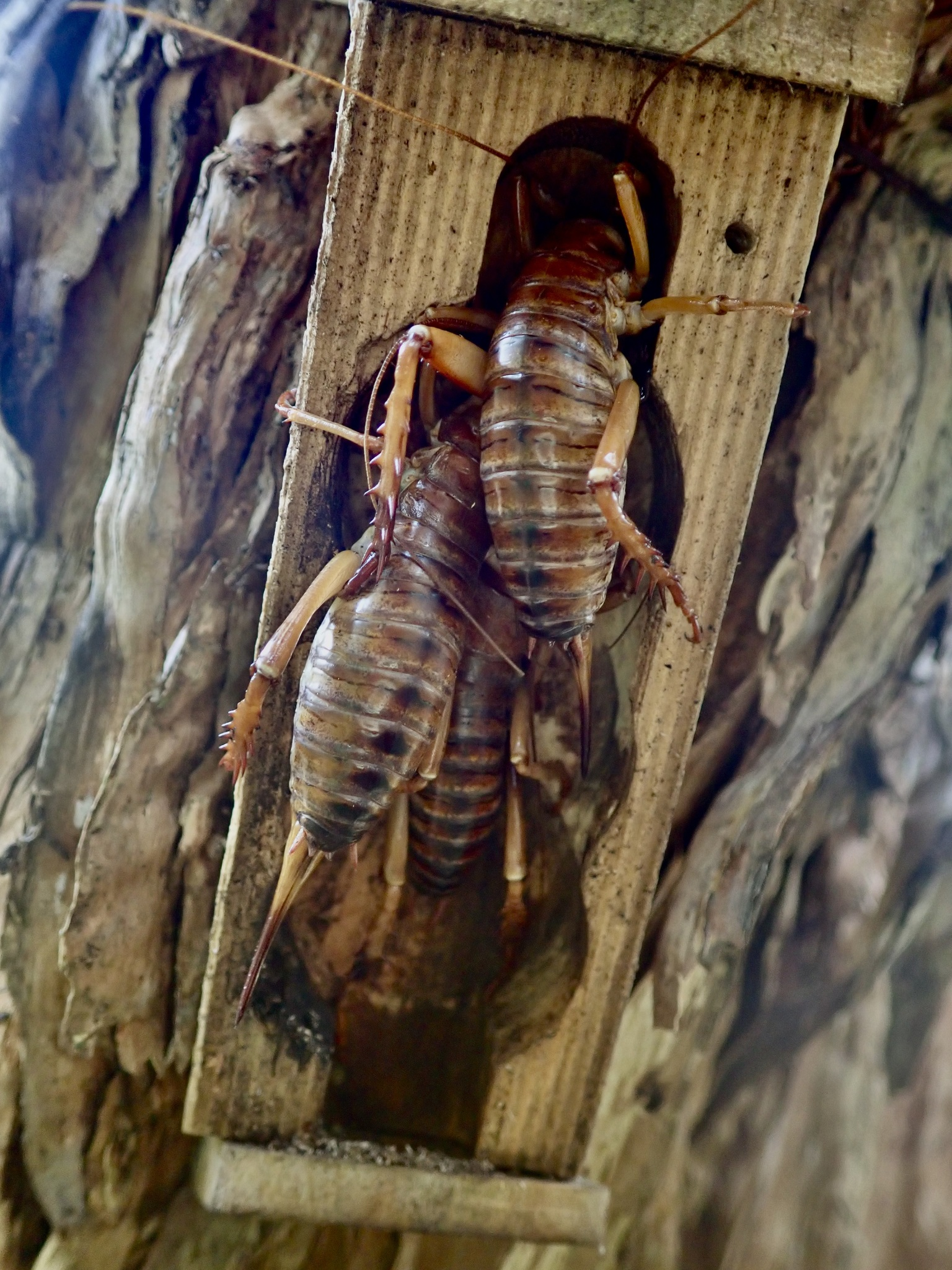

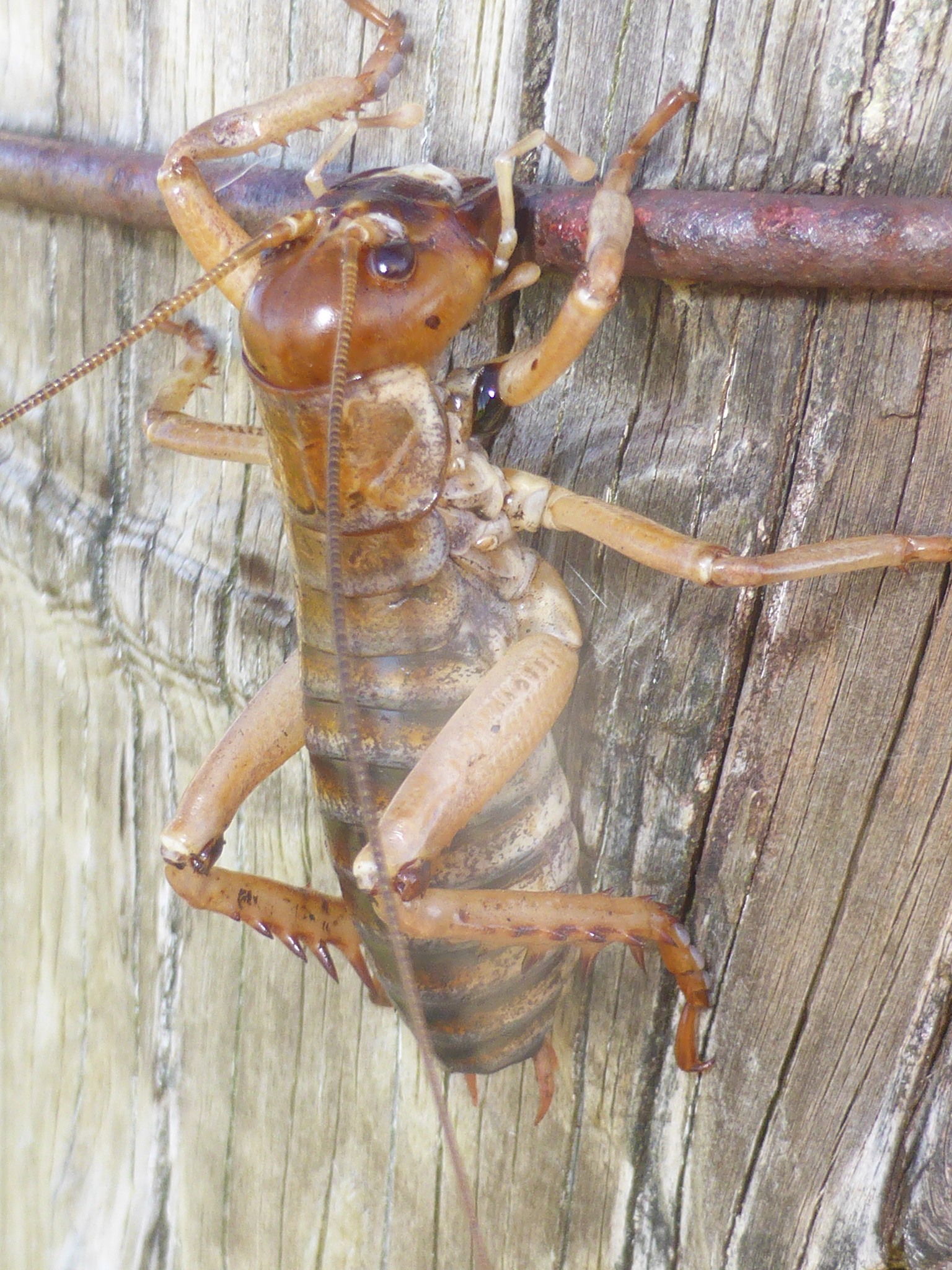

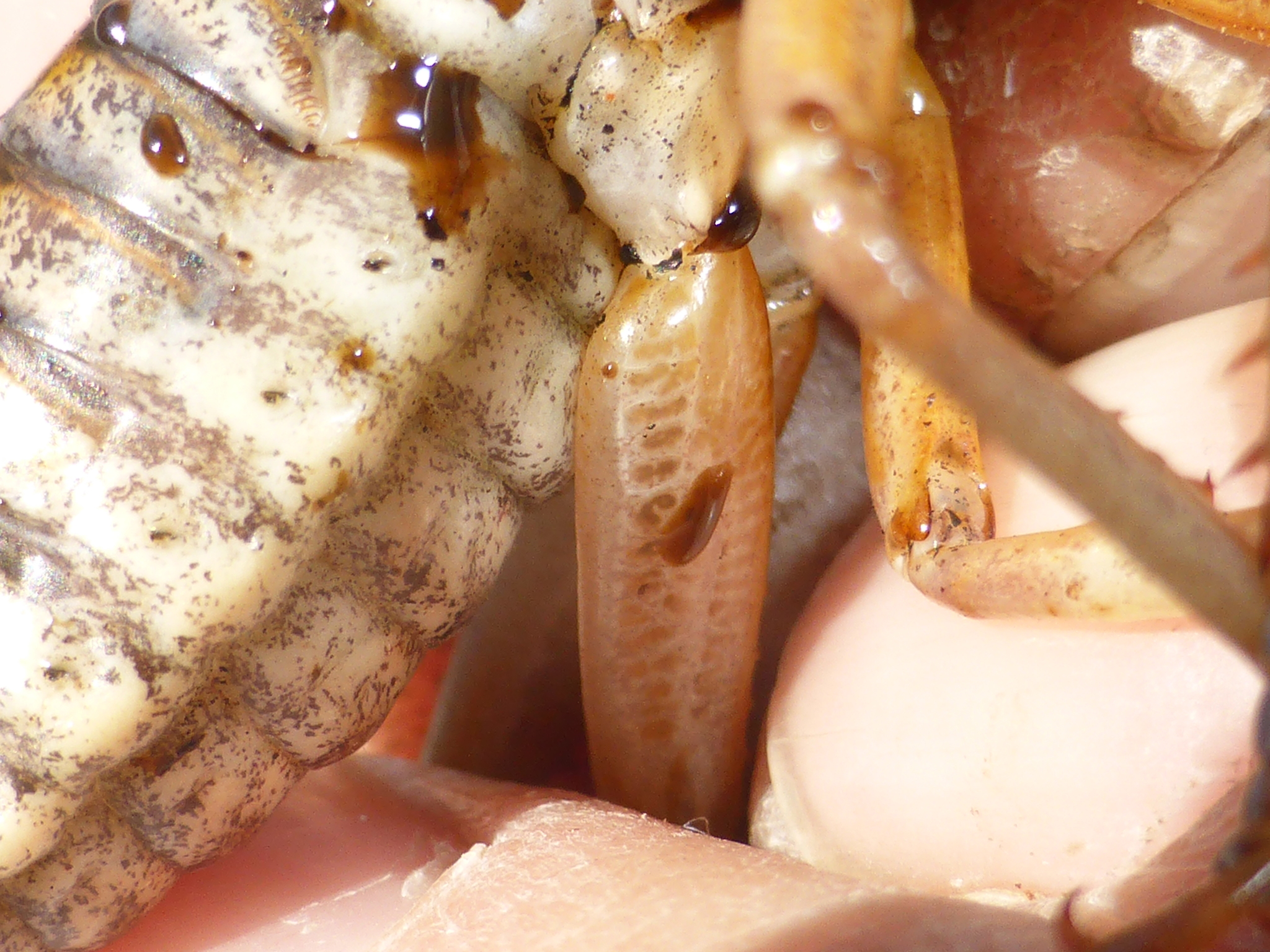

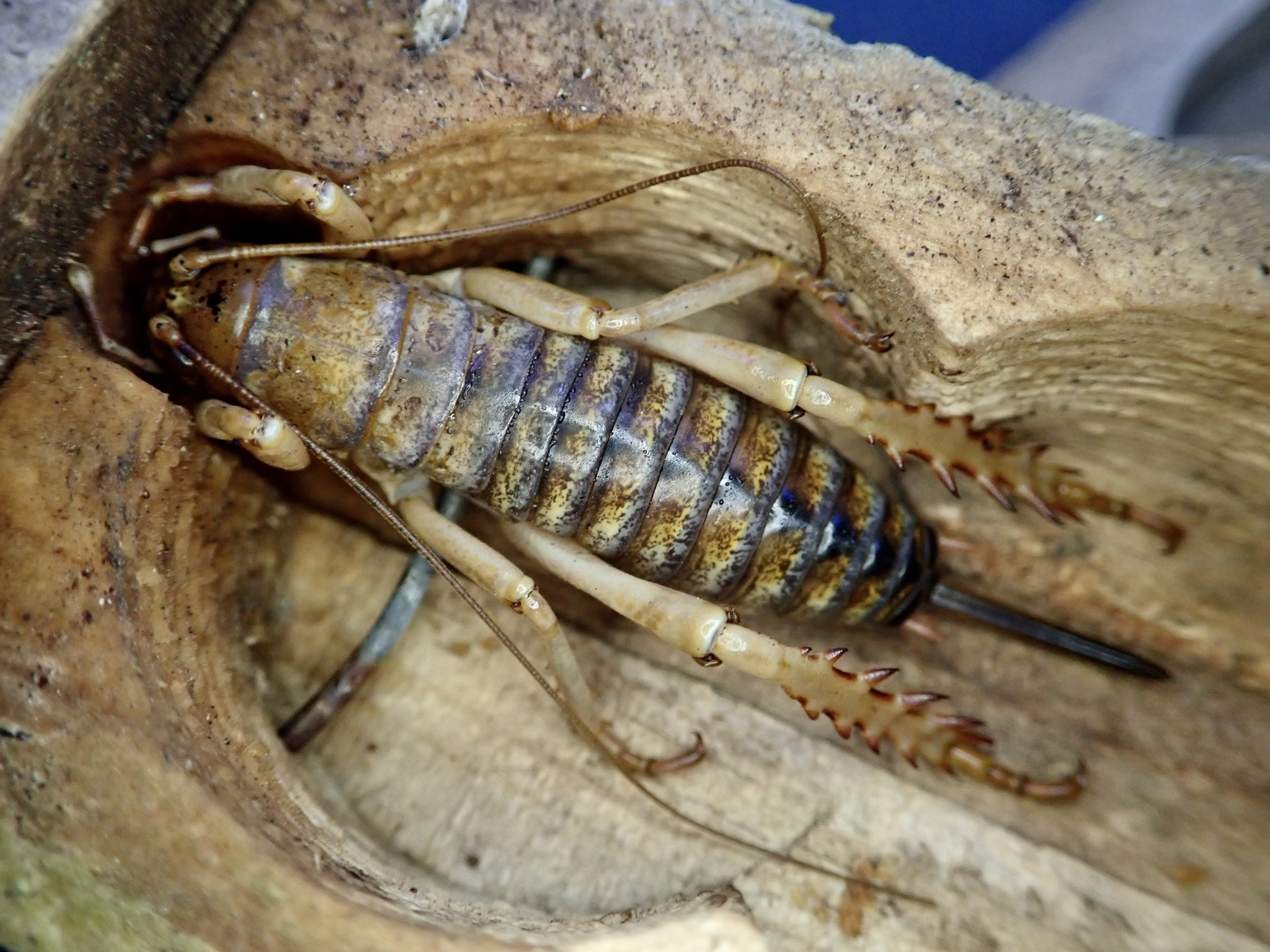

== Sources ==
- Field, L (2000). Biology of Wetas, King Crickets and their Allies. Wallingford, United Kingdom: CABI.
