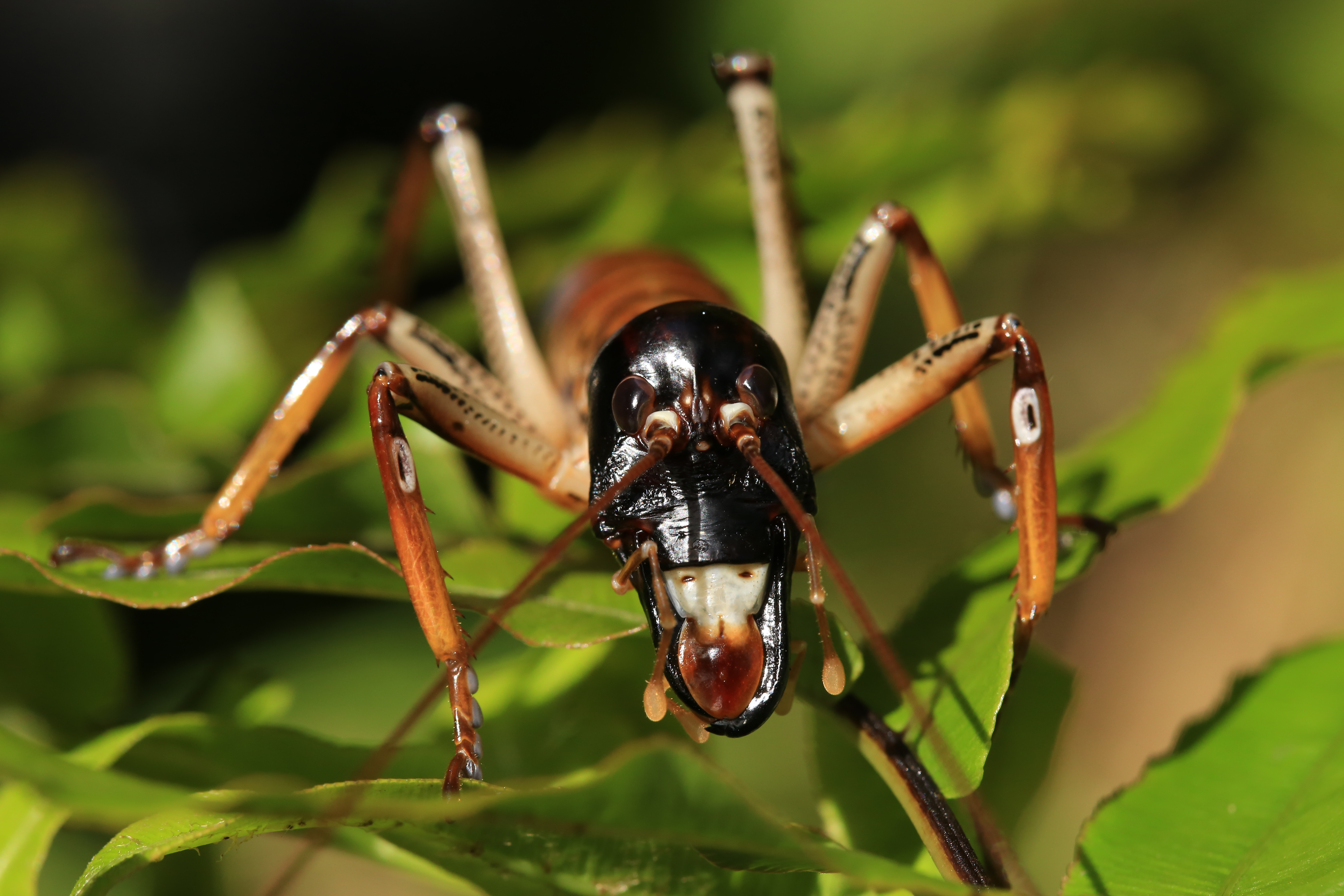

Scientific classification
- Kingdom: Animalia
- Phylum: Arthropoda
- Clade: Pancrustacea
- Class: Insecta
- Order: Orthoptera
- Suborder: Ensifera
- Family: Anostostomatidae
- Genus: Hemideina
- Species: H. thoracica

Binomial name
- Hemideina thoracica (White, 1846)

Synonyms
- Deinacrida thoracica White, 1846; Hemideina attenuata Walker, 1869; Hemideina nitens Colenso, 1888; Hemideina huttoni Kirby, 1906

= Hemideina thoracica =

Species of orthopteran insect

Hemideina thoracica, commonly known as the Auckland tree wētā or tokoriro is a cricket-like insect (within the family Anostostomatidae). It is endemic to New Zealand and is found over most of the North Island, except for the Wellington region and regions 900 metres above sea level. This species is an arboreal, herbivorous generalist however, it is also thought to be polyphagous and is found in all wooded habitats, including forest, scrub and suburban gardens.

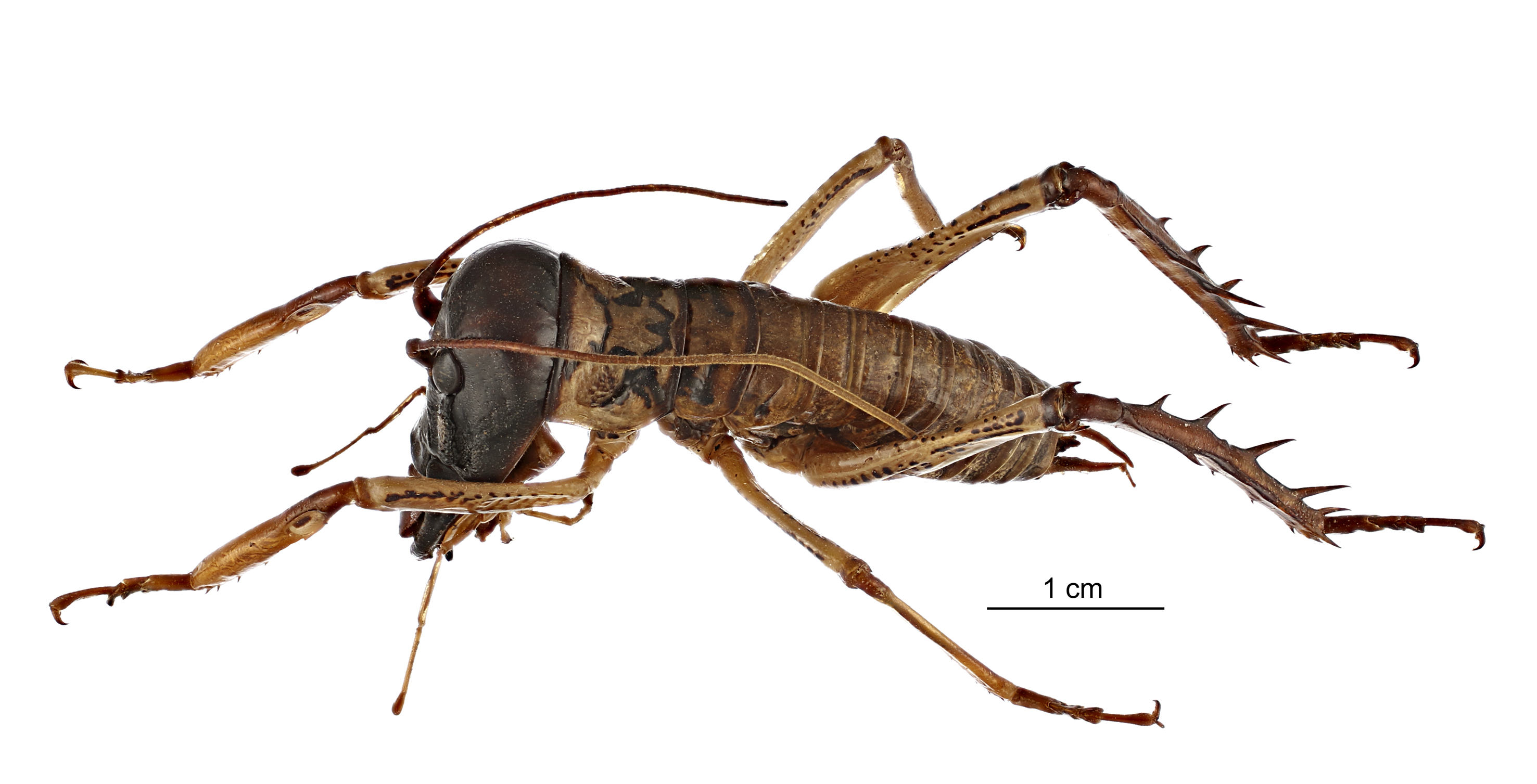
Hemideina thoracica male

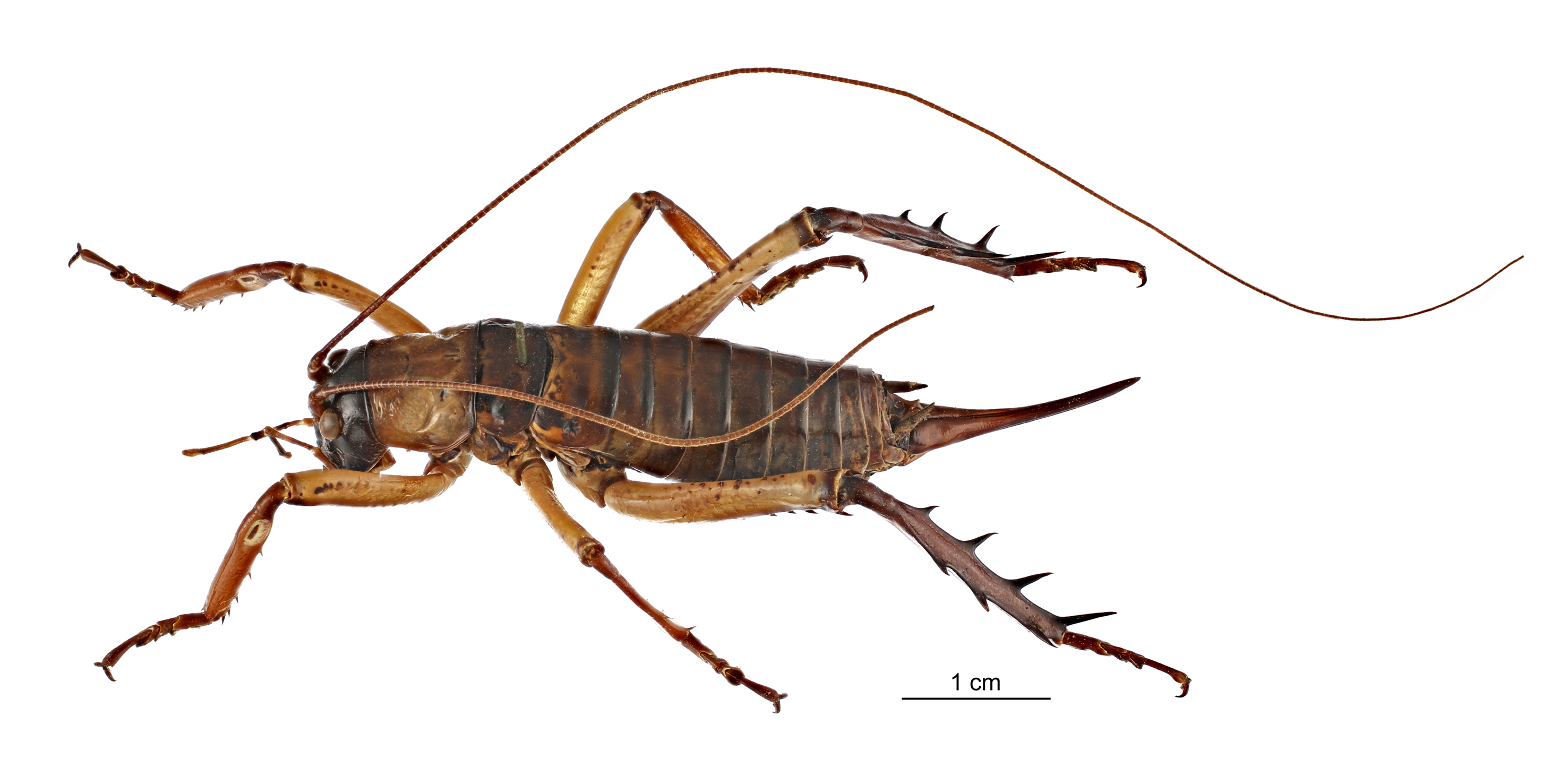
Hemideina thoracica Female

H. thoracica is morphologically uniform but chromosomally polymorphic. It comprises at least eight chromosomal races with diploid numbers from 2n=11 (XO) to 2n=23 (XO). There are hybrid zones where some of the chromosomal races meet. Phylogenetically, it is most closely related to the other North Island species (H. crassidens and H. trewicki). The conservation status of H. thoracica is "not threatened" however, the chromosome race on Karikari Peninsular (2n=23/24) is listed as "nationally vulnerable".

== Taxonomy ==
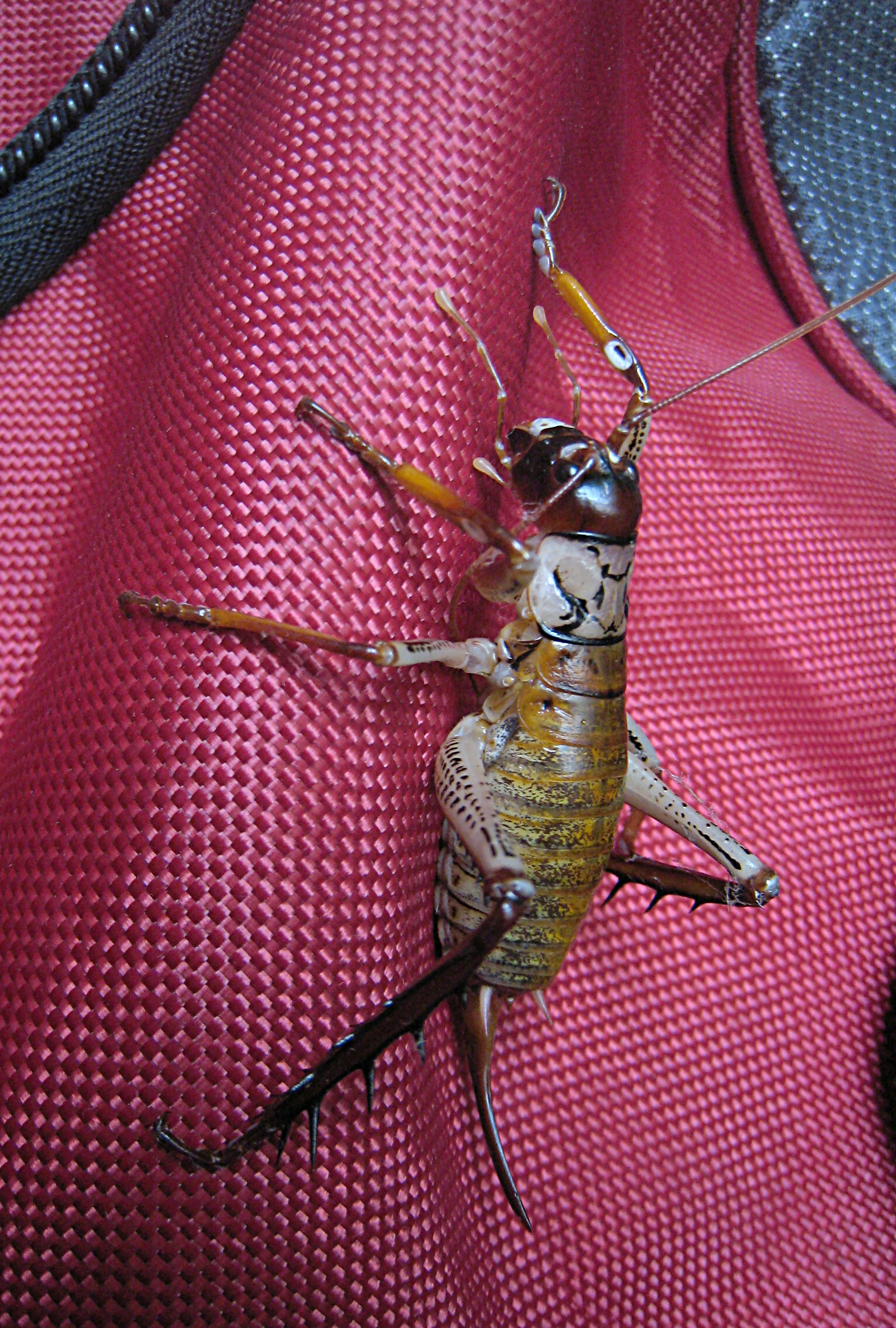
Female

Hemideina thoracica was first described by Scottish zoologist Adam White in 1846, but at that time included in the genus Deinacrida. It was later made the type species for the wētā genus Hemideina, described in 1869 by Walker.

== Habitat and distribution ==
The Auckland tree wētā, Hemideina thoracica is endemic to New Zealand and has a wide distribution over the northern two-thirds of the North Island. It is abundant in central and north North Island where it inhabits forest or scrub at lowland elevation. As a nocturnal and arboreal herbivore this species uses tree cavities to rest and conceal itself in during the day before emerging at night to feed. It is parapatric with two other Hemideina spp. in the North Island: H. crassidens and H. trewicki and in warmer areas it is thought to competitively exclude H. crassidens which is distributed in the lower North Island and north-west of the South Island.

== Diet ==
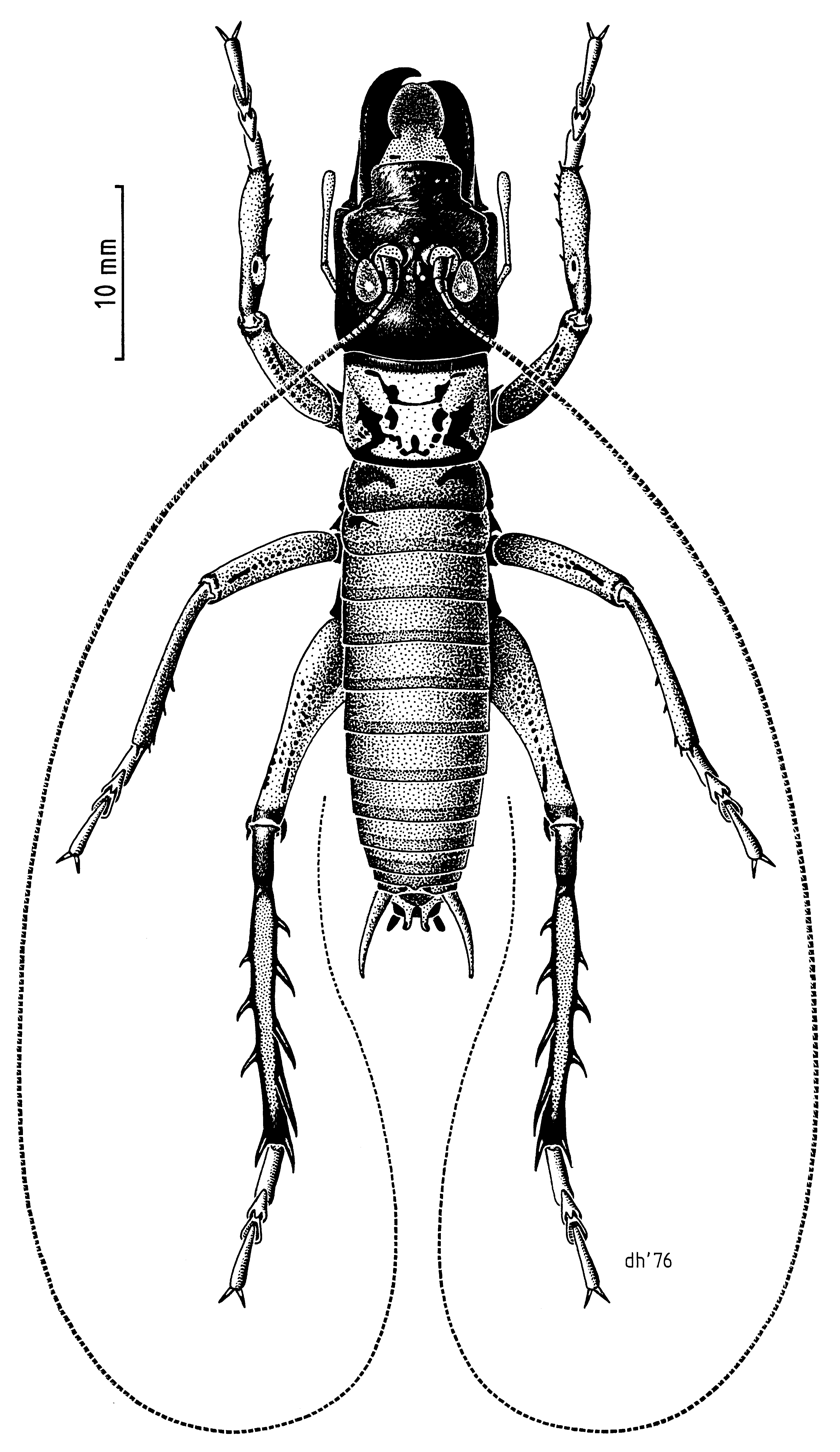
Dorsal view of male; illustration by Des Helmore

Like other tree wētā Hemideina thoracica forages arboreally at night, eating mostly leaves and some fruit and seeds from a range of different plants. Recently, it has been suggested that this species feeds selectively on a range of plant species and is omnivorous with invertebrates and fruit and seeds included in the diet. Plants are selectively eaten with species such as Mahoe (Melicytus ramiflorus) or Karamu (Coprosma robusta) preferred. However, Auckland tree wētā also feed on small insects and are thought to be polyphagous. H. thoracica inhabiting higher elevation sites have been shown to consume more invertebrates and fewer plant species than those at low elevation habitats.

== Morphology ==
Hemideina thoracica are large-bodied as adults (3–7 g), being up to 40mm in length. The abdomen is brown and the pronotum pale with dark hieroglyph-like markings. This body colouration makes H. thoracica easily distinguishable from the Wellington tree wētā (H. crassidens) with which it is parapatric. As in other Hemideina spp. spines are present on the hind legs which function in defense. Morphometric analysis of spination patterns has shown that both H. thoracica and H. crassidens lack the mid-tibial ‘1/3 back’ spine which differentiates these species from all other Hemideina spp.. Hemideina thoracica has the thinnest femur and tibia compared with all other New Zealand tree wētā (Hemideina spp). Adults are sexually dimorphic with males having enlarged mandibles used for fighting other males.

== Cytogenetics ==
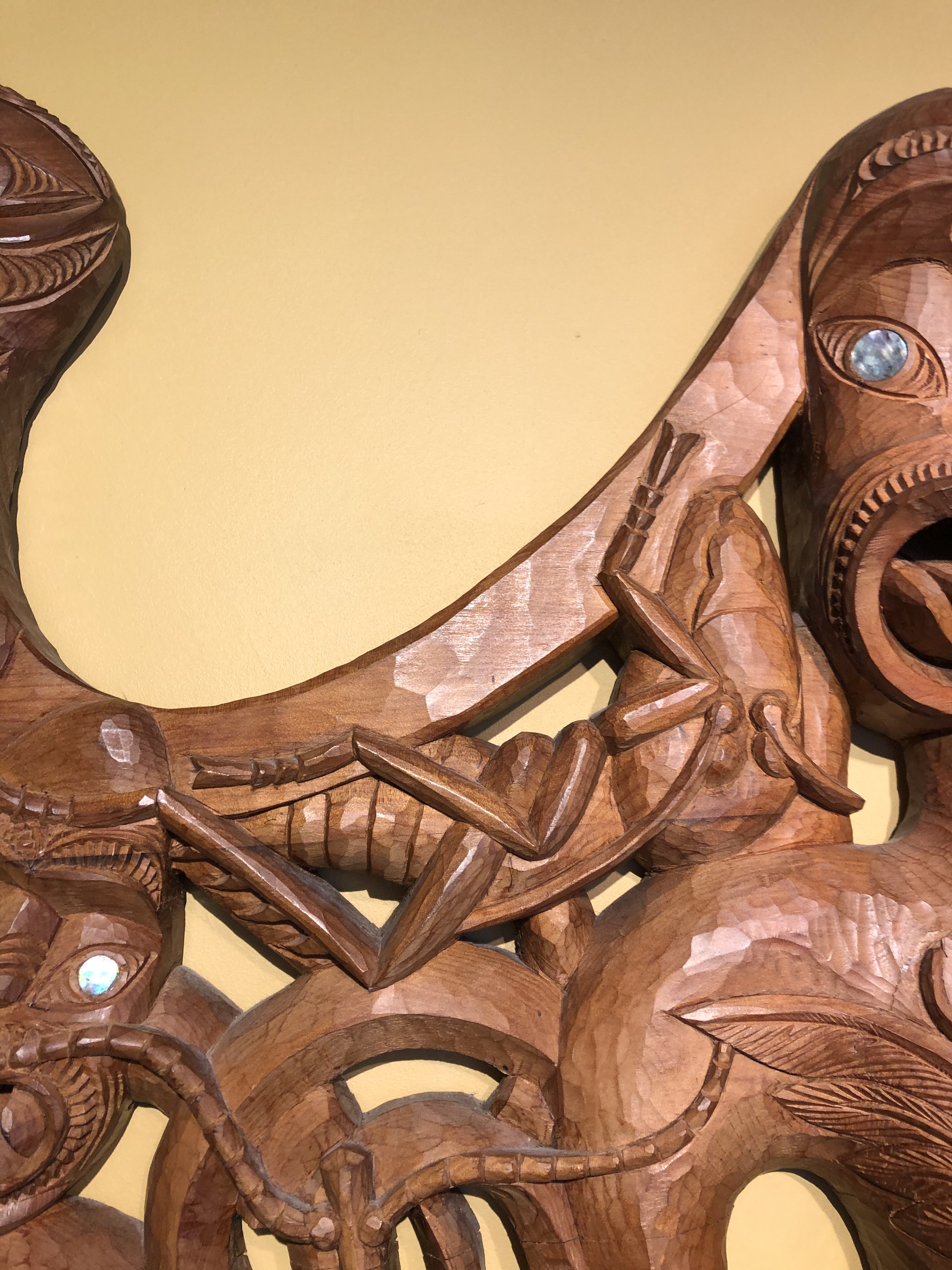
Tree wētā carved on pare on display at the New Zealand Arthropod Collection at Landcare Research, Auckland.

Hemideina thoracica is chromosomally polymorphic meaning that differential chromosomal arrangement occurs among populations of this species. Nine distinct chromosome races each comprising a different karyotype have been described and these range in diploid numbers from 2n=11 (XO) to 2n=23 (XO). Five different hybrid zones have been located where, in different combinations six of the nine chromosome races come into contact with one another. Three of these zones (Mt. Camel, Karikari and Waitangi) involve northern chromosome races which likely originated in the Pliocene, whereas the southern races in the Bream Bay and Taupō zones are likely to be much younger. Despite having differing chromosome numbers, morphology of H. thoracica is uniform (see 'Morphology' above).

== Behaviour ==
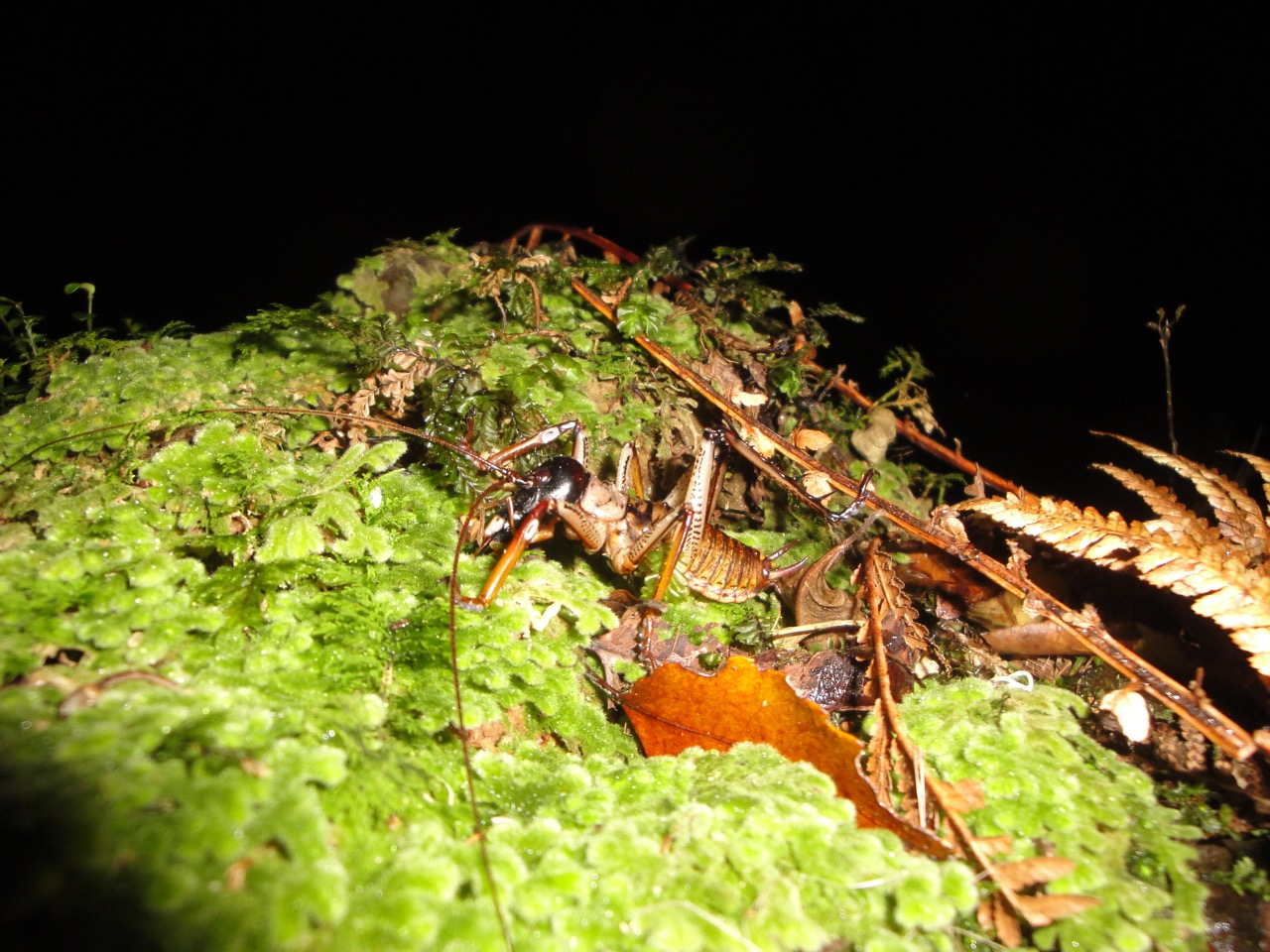
At East Cape

Hemideina thoracica is capable of producing sound using stridulation of the metathoracic legs and the abdomen. Both males and females produce a rasping sound when disturbed by raising and extending the legs above the body followed by a defensive kick while tightly holding the legs against the abdomen. Using abdominal oscillation, males also generate an intraspecific song when in close contact with one another. However, H. thoracica has poor mate recognition systems and forms sterile hybrids with H. crassidens and H. trewicki where they are sympatric in the southern North Island.

As a nocturnal species, H. thoracica occupy cavities during the day and occupancy patterns have been shown to be influenced by both season and sex of previous occupants. Females tend to avoid cavities in which other females reside and are found in cavities alone however, this changes during summer when females form harems Males and females which were previously living apart begin living together in early summer.

== Breeding ==
It has been suggested that Auckland tree wētā have a polygynandrous mating system whereby both males and females mate with multiple partners. This species is a hemimetabolous insect whose eggs hatch in Spring with a minimum of eight instars required to reach adulthood. Females lay eggs in the soil and provide no maternal care.

== Conservation ==
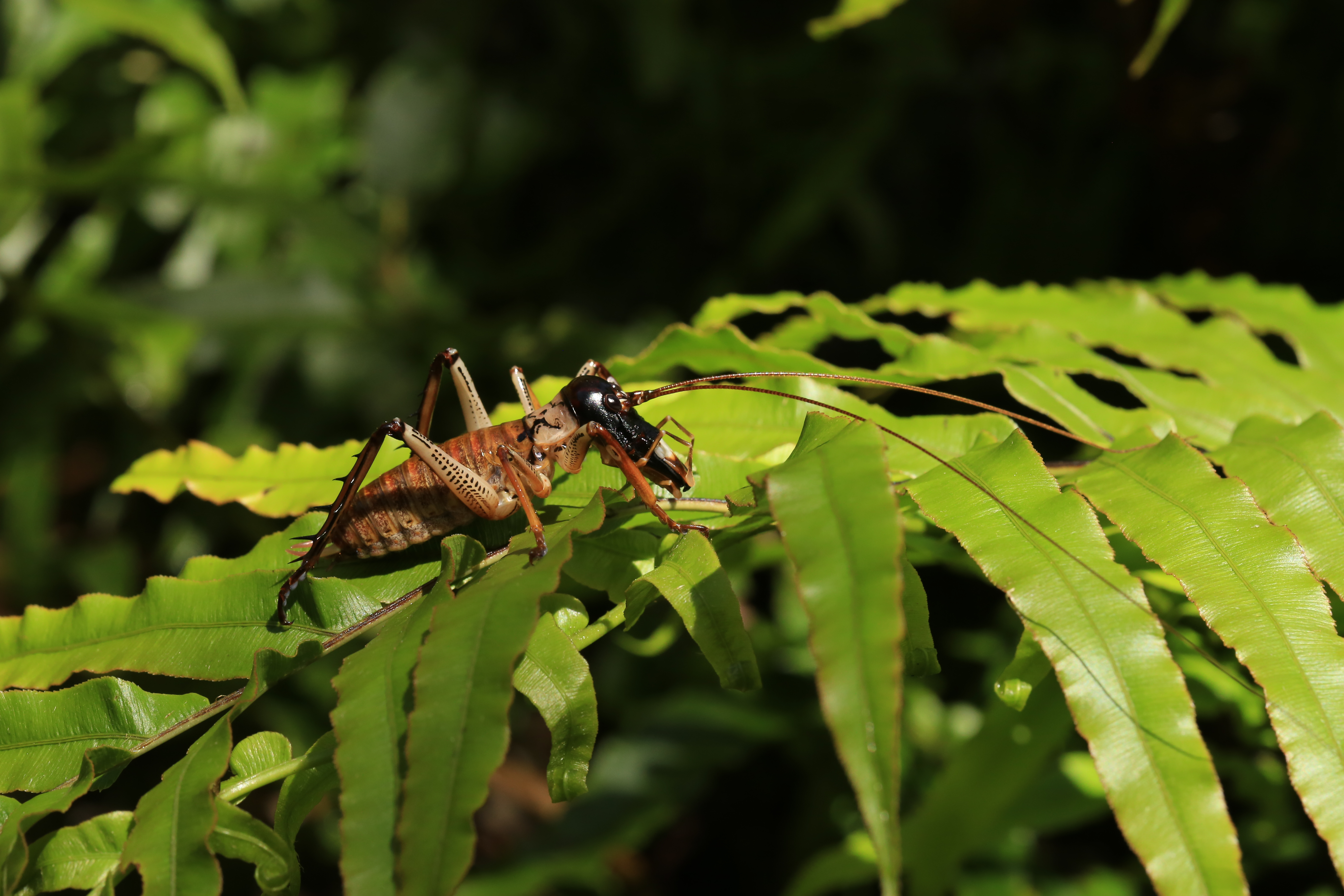
Lateral view

The conservation status of Hemideina thoracica is "not threatened" however, the chromosome race on Karikari Peninsular (2n=23/24) is listed as "nationally vulnerable". Artificial refuges have been used to monitor populations of H. thoracica and H. crassidens and could potentially be used in conservation management of these species by providing available habitat.
