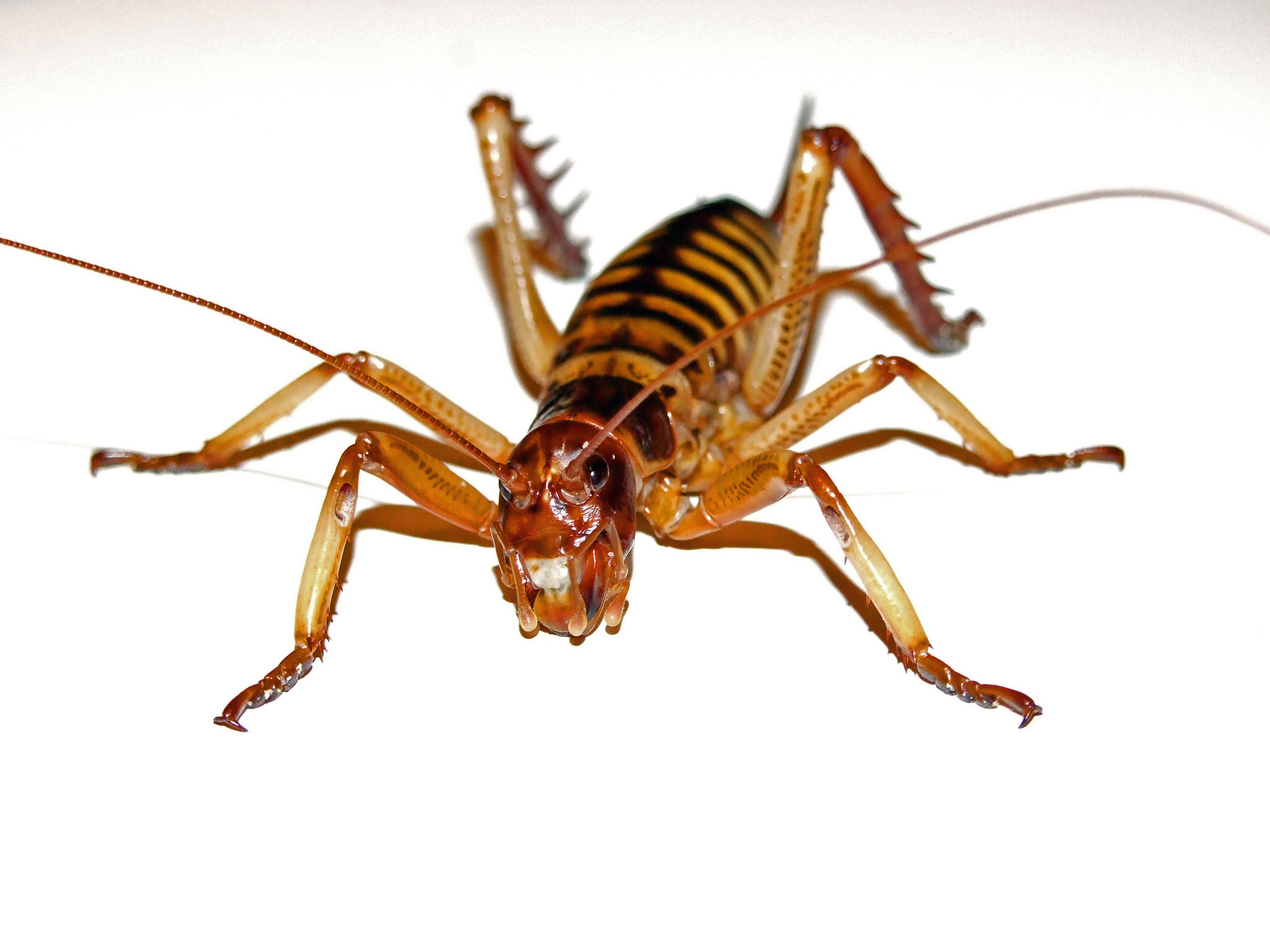
- Female
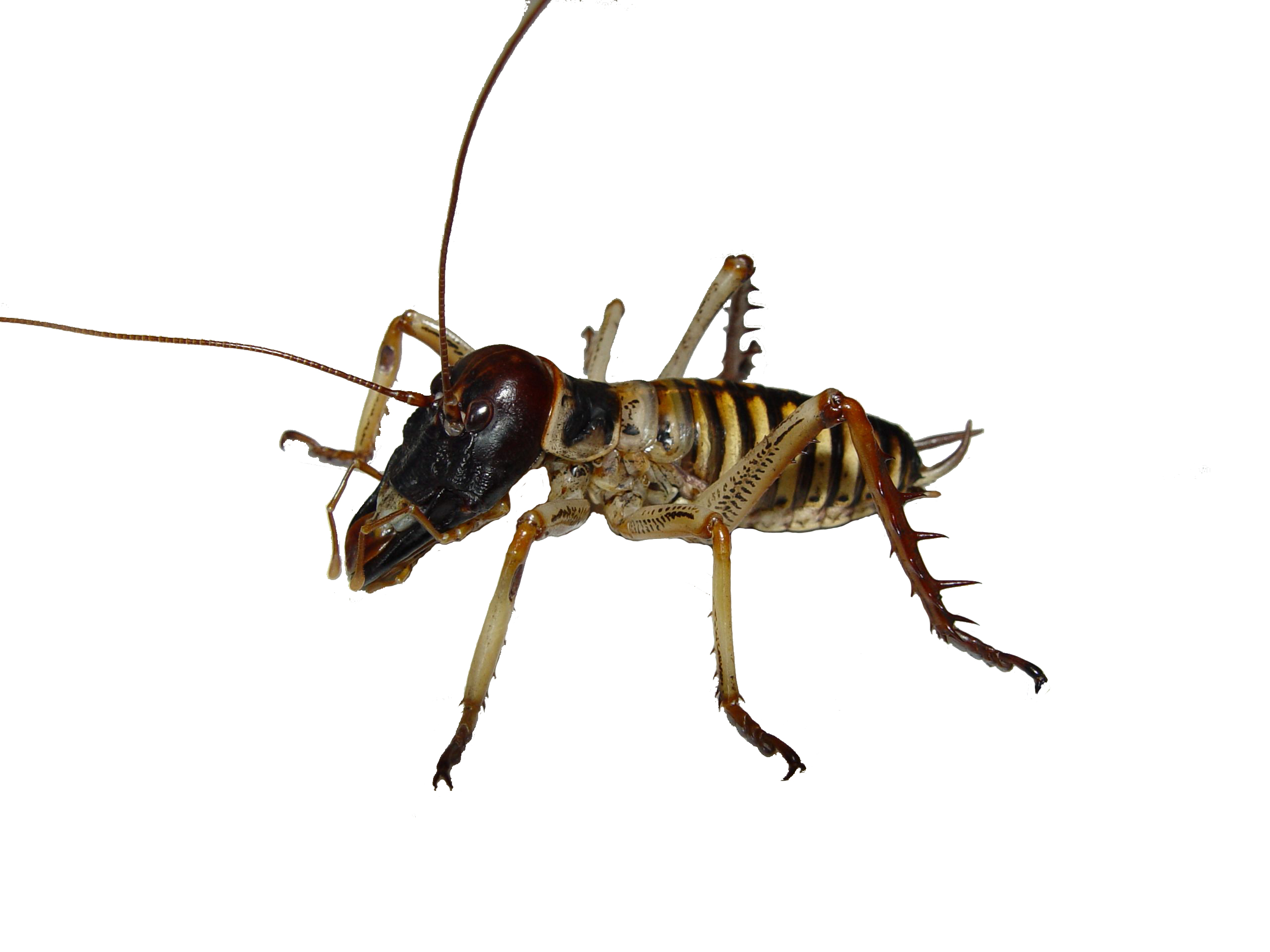
- Male

Conservation status
- Not Threatened (NZ TCS)

Scientific classification
- Kingdom: Animalia
- Phylum: Arthropoda
- Clade: Pancrustacea
- Class: Insecta
- Order: Orthoptera
- Suborder: Ensifera
- Family: Anostostomatidae
- Genus: Hemideina
- Species: H. crassidens

Binomial name
- Hemideina crassidens (Blanchard, 1851)
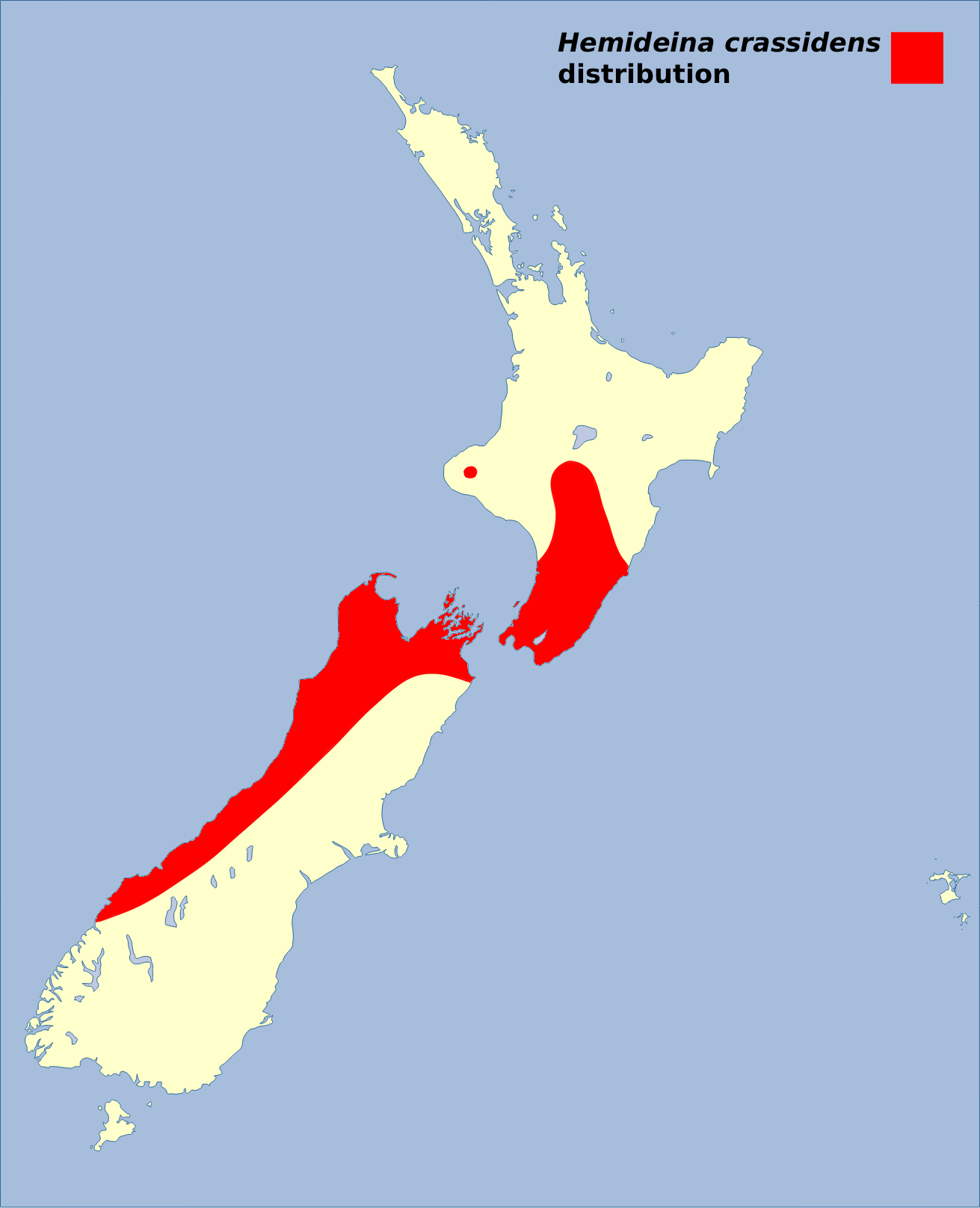
- Hemideina crassidens distribution

Synonyms
- List: Hemideina crassicrurus Salmon, 1950; Anostostoma crassidens Blanchard, 1851; Hemideina crassicruris Salmon, 1950; Deinacrida ligata Brunner von Wattenwyl, 1888; Deinacrida armiger Colenso, 1886; Hemideina crassidens figurata Walker, 1869; Hemideina figurata Walker, 1869; Hemideina fusifera Walker, 1869; Deinacrida megacephala Buller, 1867; Gnathoclita crassidens (Blanchard, 1851); Hemideina abbreviata Walker, 1869; Hemideina armiger (Colenso, 1886); Hemideina brevaculea Salmon, 1950; Hemideina capitolina Walker, 1869; Hemideina megacephala (Buller, 1867); Hemideina producta Walker, 1869; Hemideina tibialis Walker, 1869; Stenopelmatus crassidens (Blanchard, 1851)

= Hemideina crassidens =

Species of orthopteran insect

Hemideina crassidens, commonly known as the Wellington tree wētā, is a large, flightless, nocturnal insect in the family Anostostomatidae. This wētā species is endemic to New Zealand and populates regions in the southern half of North Island/Te Ika a Maui and the north-west of the South Island/Te Wai Pounamu. They forage arboreally during the night and are most likely polyphagous. There is obvious sexual dimorphism in adults. Individuals are reliant on tree cavities for refuge, social interactions and mating.

The conservation status of H. crassidens is "not threatened".

== Taxonomy ==
This species was first described as Anostostoma crassidens in 1851 by Émile Blanchard. Although Hemideina crassidens is endemic to New Zealand, the first known specimen was collected in Chile, presumably by Claude Gay. It has been suggested that this species was accidentally introduced to Chile due to trade routes (although no more specimens have been found). In 1935, it was recognized as belonging to Hemideina by Heinrich Hugo Karny and subsequently moved to this genus.

There have been eleven previous descriptions of H. crassidens that were later synonymized. Of these, eight were in the Hemideina and three were in Deinacrida. These synonyms were created by Francis Walker, Walter Buller, Carl Brunner von Wattenwyl, John Salmon and William Colenso.

== Description ==
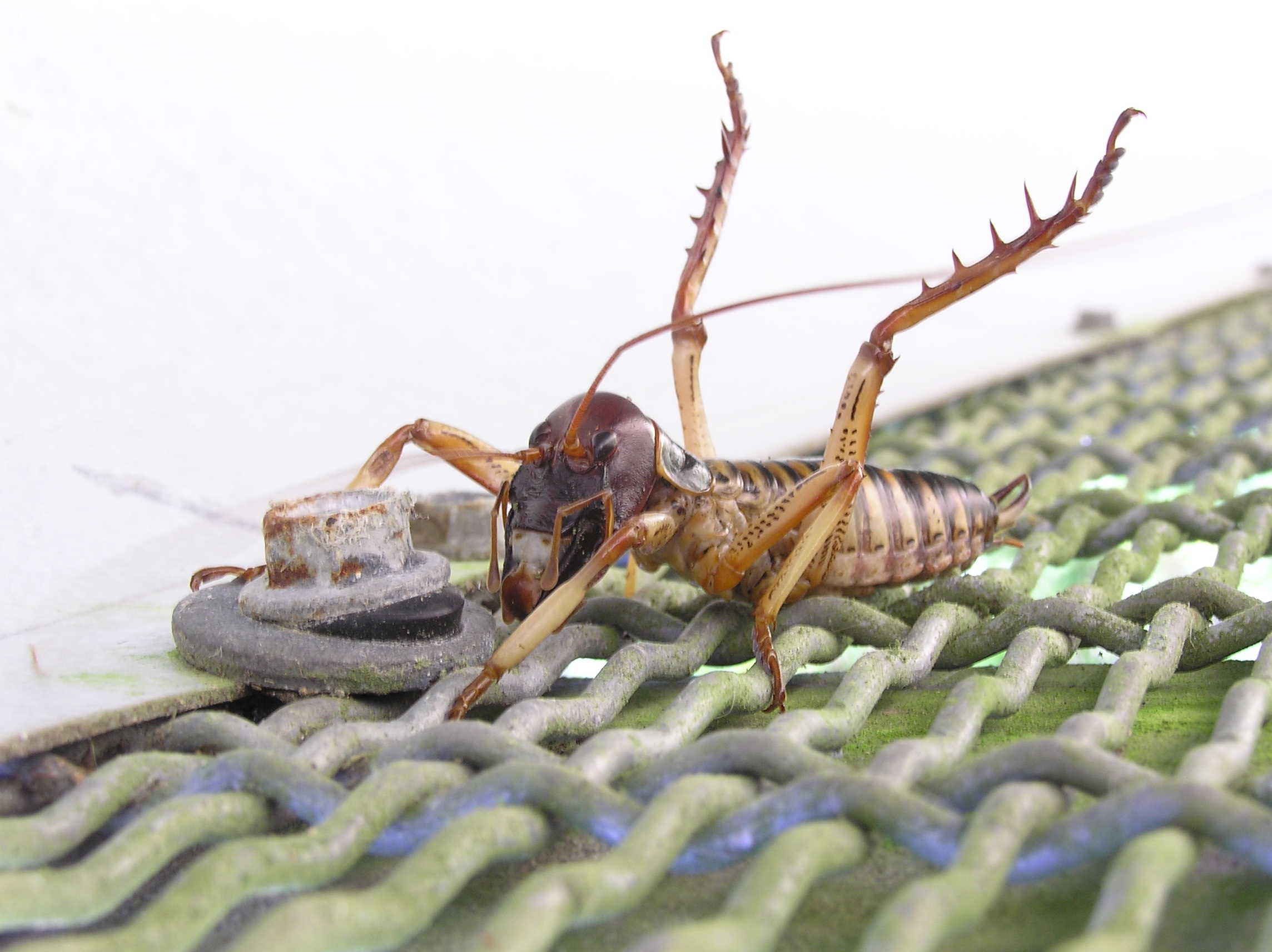
Male Wellington tree wētā showing defensive back legs raised posture (Hemideina crassidens).

Hemideina crassidens are relatively large at maturity (> 6.5 cm body length). Their bodies are smooth and shiny, the abdomen is ringed with contrasting bands of dark brownish to black and yellow, with a pale underside. This colouration is reminiscent of uniform of the Wellington rugby team, the Hurricanes, and can be used to distinguish it from the Auckland tree wētā (Hemideina thoracica). They have heavily spined hind tibiae that are used in defence postures. The antennae are long and mobile to help with sensing and navigation, particularly in the dark. The H. crassidens and the Hawkes Bay tree wētā (Hemideina trewicki) look near identical, but have different numbers of chromosomes.

=== Sexual dimorphism ===
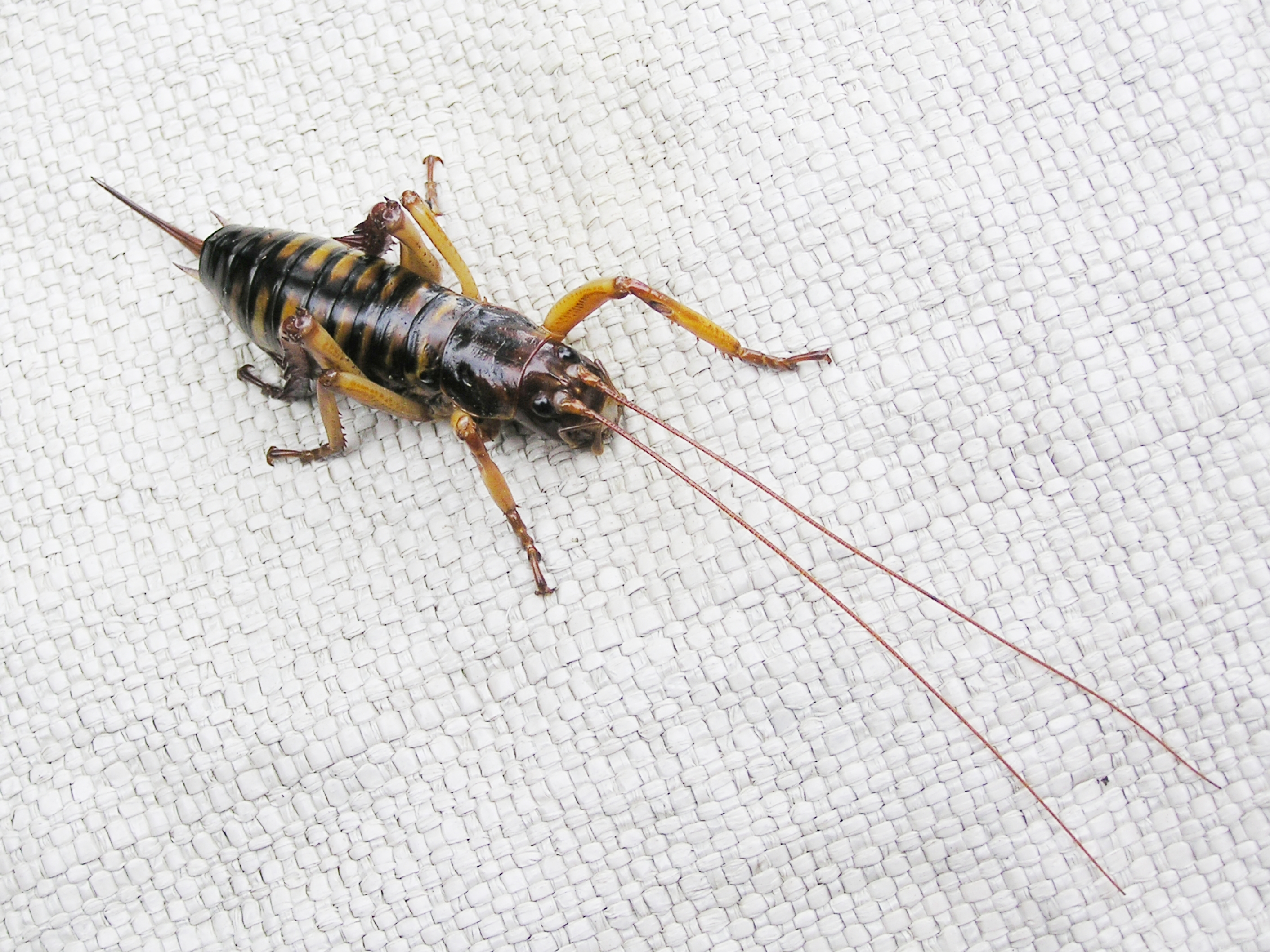
A female H. crassidens showing long ovipositor (top left) and antennae.

Males display highly exaggerated, positively allometric mandibles. Accelerated maturation of males gives rise to three different head sizes that correlate their maturation on either the 8th, 9th or 10th instar. 8th instar males have small heads, 10th instar males have particularly elongated jaws and a large vertex and 9th instar males have an intermediate from. Females only reach maturity at the 10th instar. In this wētā species, females can be identified by their small head and long ovipositor.

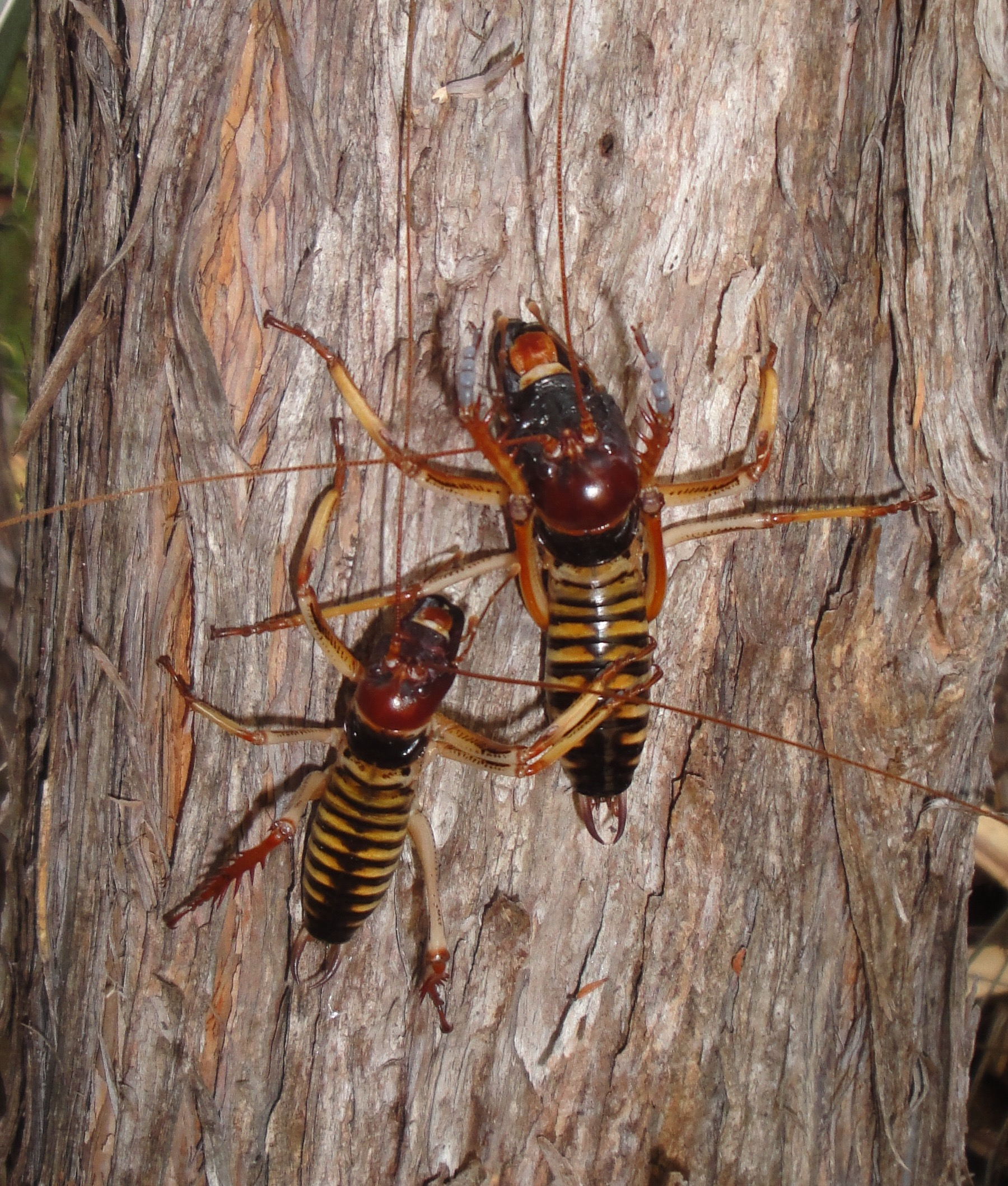
Two male H. crassidens. Both are adult, yet have quite different body, head and mandible size.

== Diet ==
Hemideina crassidens, like other Hemideina, is an omnivore. It feeds primarily on plants and has been observed in the wild feeding upon species such as kawakawa (Piper excelsum), kōtukutuku (Fuchsia excorticata) and rangiora (Brachyglottis repanda). However, in captive conditions they have been recorded feeding on a much broader range of plant species, indicating they have very general plant preferences. The species typically consumes leaves, but also feeds on flowers and fruit. Despite primarily feeding on plants, H. crassidens also opportunistically feeds on invertebrates, both dead and alive. In one experiment where captive H. crassidens individuals were given a choice of moths, fruit, leaves and seeds to feed on, H. crassidens most frequently ate the moths and fruit. Despite this preference, H. crassidens is known to be able to survive on a purely plant based diet in captive conditions.

== Distribution and habitat ==
Hemideina crassidens is endemic to New Zealand. Populations are distributed between the Ruapehu district and Wellington district of the North Island, and in the Westland district of the South Island. A closely related native tree wētā, Hemideina thoracica, is widely distributed in the northern two-thirds of the North Island New Zealand. It has been suggested that H thoracica competitively excludes H. crassidens from warmer northern regions of the North Island. On Mt Taranaki, H. crassidens is found only at elevations above ~700 m asl, and H. thoracica is found lower down the slopes where temperatures are slightly warmer.

Hemideina crassidens is a nocturnal and arboreal. This species uses holes in tree branches to hide during the day. They usually live in tree holes, suggesting a reliance on forest. However, many extant tree wētā populations occupy scrub habitats or even use rock refuges when trees are not available.

=== Climate change ===
In the central North Island populations of H. crassidens have become isolated within areas mostly populated by H. thoracica suggesting previous range contraction due to interactions with competitors and the environment. This contraction is likely to continue southwards during global warming, resulting in the displacement of H. crassidens from many lowland areas of central and southern North Island.

== Galleries ==
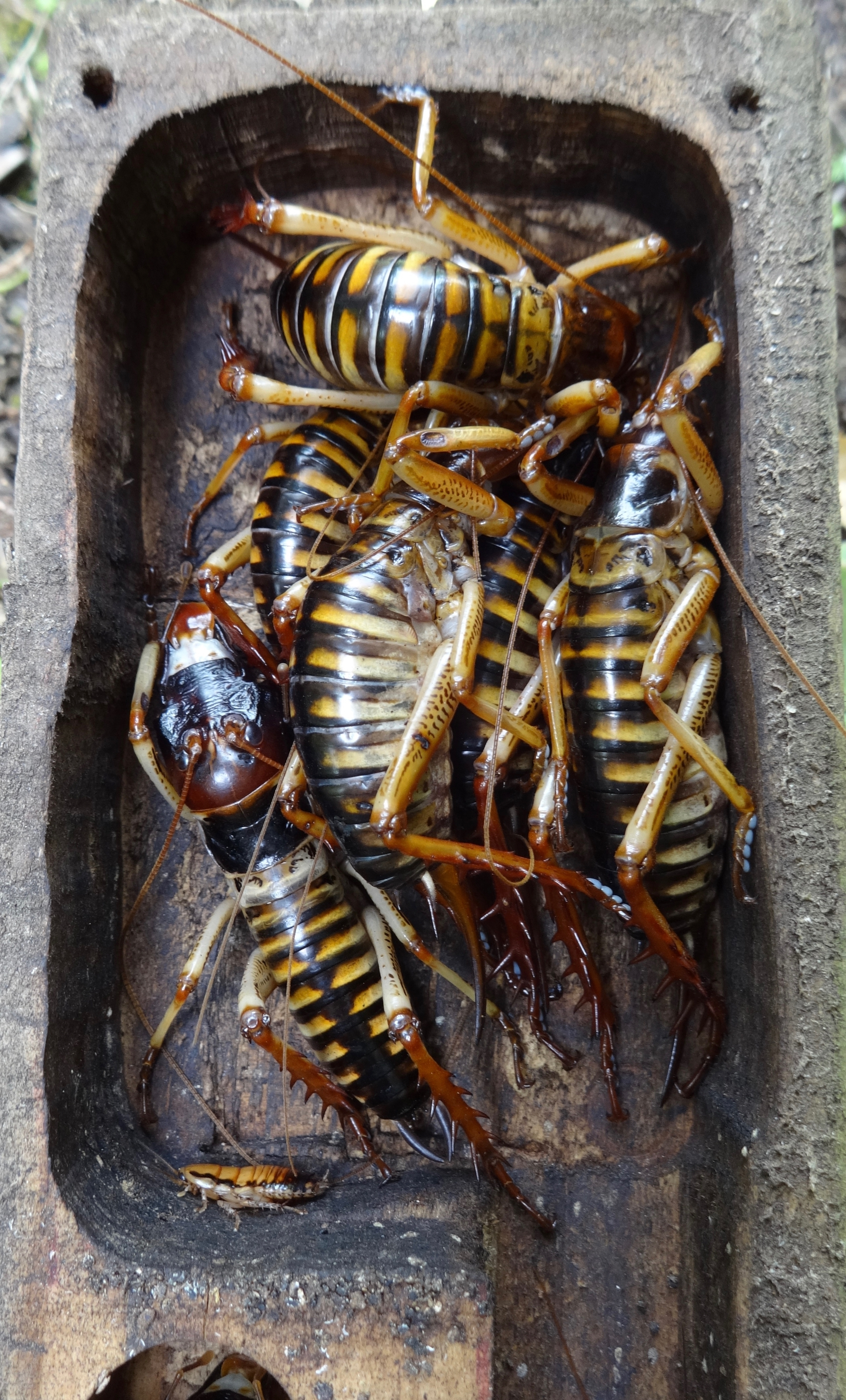
Hemideina crassidens gallery in an artificial roost

Rather than bore their own tree holes, H. crassidens inhabit natural crevices and cavities, or pre-existing tunnels that have been excavated by large wood-boring larva such as Aenetus virescens (Lepidoptera: Hepoalidae). They prefer tree holes in living timber and avoid fallen or rotten logs. Native trees and shrubs such manuka (Leptospermum scoparium), kanuka (Kunzea ericoides), ngaio (Myoporum laetum), kohekohe (Dysoxylum spectabile) and mahoe (Melicytus ramiflorus) are favoured by H. crassidens. Suitable galleries have a narrow entrance hole (~20mm in diameter) in order to provide protection from predators such as birds. The holes are entered head first and exited in reverse so that the spines on their hind tibiae point outwards to defend from intruders. Inhabited galleries can often be identified by the neatly nibbled entrance which is kept clean. Individuals often occupy the same gallery for an extended period of time. Galleries buffer against environmental variation, especially humidity.

H. crassidens galleries can be artificially replicated by creating artificial weta roosts. These roosts are small wooden structures, with entrances and small galleries drilled into them and small galleries for H. crassidens to occupy. They are also designed so they can be opened like a door, so the occupants can be viewed. The roosts are then attached to poles or trees in habitat where H. crassidens occurs. It generally takes years for the roosts to begin being used by H. crassidens. The roosts are also often occupied by other invertebrates such as spiders, cockroaches and cave wētā.

== Life history ==
Hemideina crassidens is a polygynous insect in which males guard females residing in galleries, which are used for breeding and males compete for access to the females within. Male head size is an indicator of combative ability as the head is used as weaponry in combat for dominance and control of a harem. In cases where the gallery is sufficiently large, multiple males can occupy a single gallery, suggesting that a dominant male defends a harem rather than a gallery per se. Males can avoid combat by facing off, opening their jaws and assessing the gape of their opponent's mandibles. In a non-violent contest the male whose mandibles span the furthest is considered dominant. Small headed males can mate by wandering nocturnally and copulating with females outside of a gallery, or by sneaking into a gallery occupied by a dominant male and copulating with females within. A small headed male is able to control a harem within a gallery if the entrance is too small for large headed males to fit through.

Most matings and ovipositions occur over the summer and autumn. Females lay their eggs vertically in the soil approximately 10mm under the surface. Hatching occurs in spring and individuals take about 18 months to become mature, reaching sexual maturity in the following summer. Hemideina crassidens do not show any parental care. Their normal lifespan is about 3 years, with about 18 months as immatures.

In the wild, H. crassidens will hybridise with H. thoracica. Male hybrids collected from the wild were found to be able to mate and produce offspring, but females appeared to be infertile.

The male to female sex ratio of H. crassidens populations has been estimated to be roughly equal based on a metanalysis of numerous surveys. One study predicted that due to mammalian predation, the sex ratio would be biased towards females since the sexually dimorphic morphology and mating behaviour of the male would make them more vulnerable to predation. However, this was proven to not be the case.

== Physiology ==
The rate at which H. crassidens grows can be influenced by elevation. In one study, individuals collected from altitudes of over 800m matured into adults faster and grew larger than those from lower altitudes despite being kept in identical conditions. The rate of female growth and final size was also greater than the males. It was also predicted that high altitude individuals would have higher metabolic rates to compensate for their colder environment, but no significant difference in metabolic rate between low and high altitude individuals could be detected.

In New Zealand, mammalian pest species are often controlled by usage of targeted poisons such as brodifacoum. Although not known to directly cause mortality in H. crassidens, individuals that consume brodifacoum have altered behaviour. In one study where H. crassidens was fed the poison, it began to emerge from roosts earlier and was less active and aggressive than individuals not exposed to the poison. However it is unclear what impact this would have on survival.

== Behaviour ==
The presence of mammalian predators within an ecosystem impacts the behaviour of H. crassidens. In a study of H. crassidens collected from the predator-free ecosanctuary Zealandia, it was found that the wētā were more active and aggressive than those living in unprotected areas. It was suggested that this was because H. crassidens in unprotected areas had exposure to mammalian predators, which caused them to develop more wary behaviour to improve survival odds, especially as aggressive behaviour is likely ineffective against these predators. Similarly, when rats and weka were eradicated (Gallirallus australis) on the Chetwode Islands in the Marlborough Sounds, H. crassidens began to occupy larger galleries near the ground, which are more vulnerable to predation. They also appeared to spend more time actively foraging.

== Predators and parasites ==
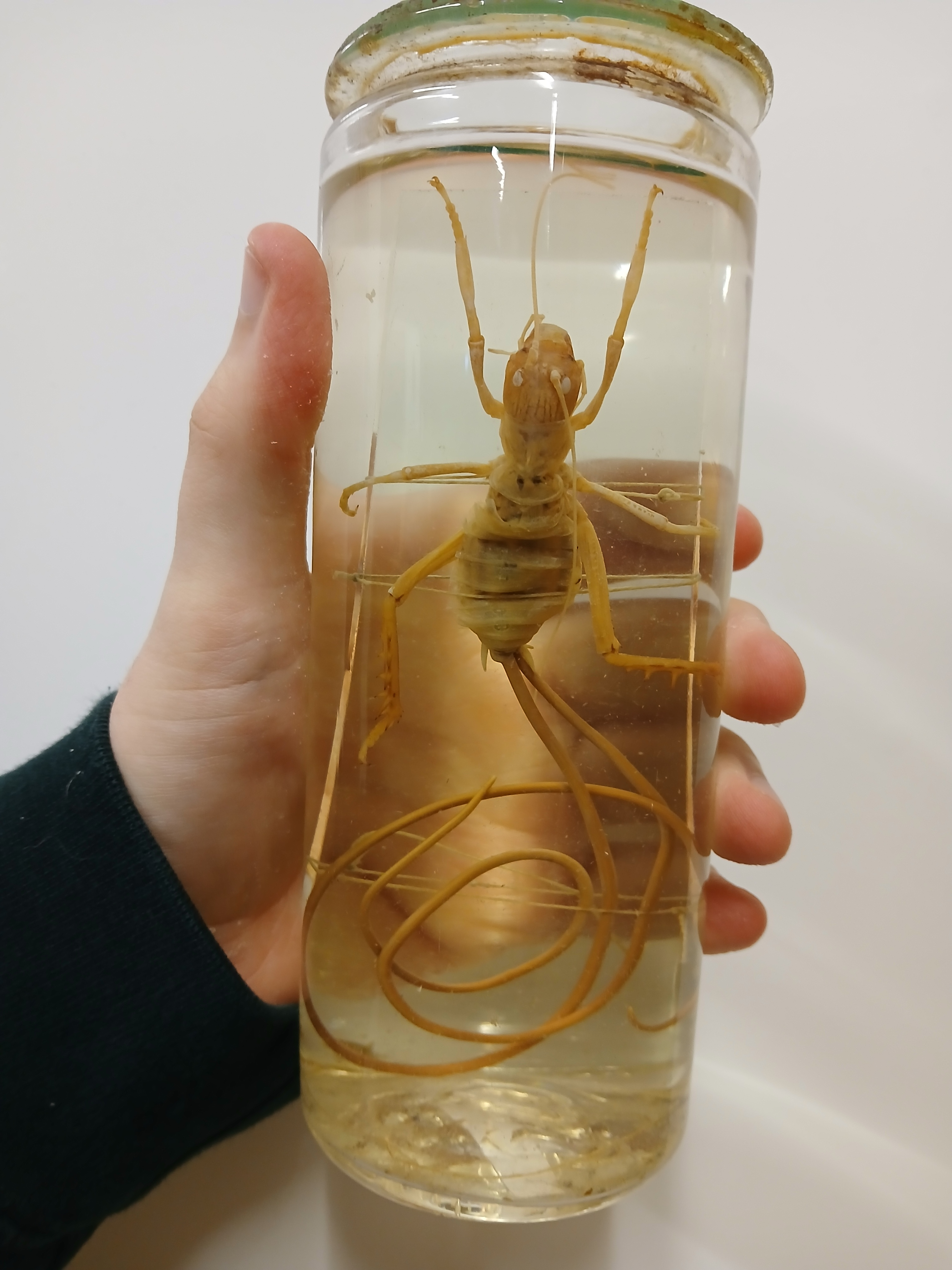
A preserved tree wētā (Hemideina) with a hairworm parasite.

Among New Zealand's exotic mammal pests, kiore (Rattus exulans) and ship rats (Rattus rattus) are well known to feed on H. crassidens. Although they haven't been directly reported to prey upon H. crassidens, other exotic species that prey upon Hemideina include brushtail possums (Trichosurus vulpecula), stoats (Mustela erminea) and feral cats (Felis catus). Native predators include weka and tuatara (Sphenodon punctatus). Similarly, moreporks (Ninox novaeseelandiae) are known to feed on Hemideina. In captive conditions, New Zealand's lesser short-tailed bats (Mystacina tuberculata) feed on H. crassidens and are inferred to predate Hemideina in the wild.

The parasitic hairworm Gordionus diblastus is abundant in the Wellington region within H. crassidens populations, but occurs throughout the country. How individuals become infected with the hairworm has not been observed, but it is presumed that infection occurs after H. crassidens consumes invertebrate prey. Inside the host, the worm develops, often becoming longer than the host itself. Once the worm has matured, it modifies the host behaviour to seek out water, in which the host drowns and the worm leaves the body.

Nothotrombicula deinacridae, a species of mite, parasitises H. crassidens by latching onto soft parts of the host and sucking up fluid. One study investigated whether either sex of H. crassidens is more heavily parasitised by this mite, but found that the rate of parasitism was equal between sexes.

== Genetics ==
In the southern parts of its distribution, which extends throughout most of its range in the South Island, H. crassidens have a 19 karyotype (a complete set of chromosomes), with 19 chromosomes in the male or 20 in the female. However, north of the Buller River in the South Island, H. crassidens has a 15 karyotype, with males having 15 chromosomes and females 16. In contrast to this, the closely related H. trewicki has 17 (male) or 18 (female) chromosomes.

== Conservation ==
The number of suitable galleries in an area is considered to be a major limiting resource of H. crassidens. The construction and distribution of artificial refuges has been suggested as a possible conservation strategy to try and increase populations of H. crassidens and H. thoracica.

Under the New Zealand Threat Classification System, this species is listed as "Not Threatened" as of 2022. The population is considered stable. H. crassidens has been reported as "Not Threatened" in previous assessments.
