= Stenocerus longulus =

Scientific classification
- Domain: Eukaryota
- Kingdom: Animalia
- Phylum: Arthropoda
- Class: Insecta
- Order: Coleoptera
- Suborder: Polyphaga
- Infraorder: Cucujiformia
- Family: Anthribidae
- Genus: Stenocerus
- Species: S. longulus

Binomial name
- Stenocerus longulus Jekel, 1855

Species of beetle

Stenocerus longulus is a species of fungus weevil in the beetle family Anthribidae. It is found in Central America, North America, and South America.
