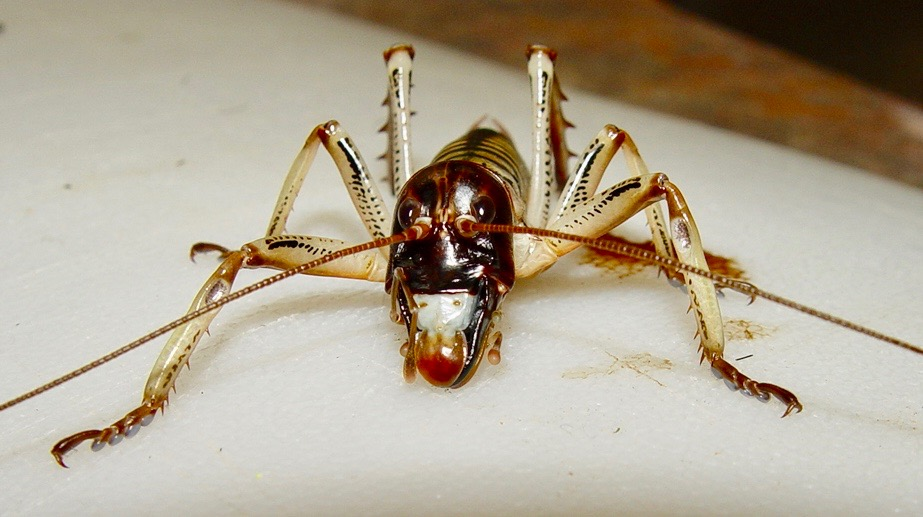
- Hemideina trewicki (male)

Scientific classification
- Kingdom: Animalia
- Phylum: Arthropoda
- Clade: Pancrustacea
- Class: Insecta
- Order: Orthoptera
- Suborder: Ensifera
- Family: Anostostomatidae
- Genus: Hemideina
- Species: H. trewicki

Binomial name
- Hemideina trewicki Morgan-Richards 1995

= Hemideina trewicki =

Species of orthopteran insect

Hemideina trewicki, the Hawke's Bay tree wētā, is a large arboreal long-horned cricket in the order Orthoptera. The species is endemic to New Zealand and restricted to the Hawke's Bay region of North Island

Hemideina trewicki is a cryptic species: it looks like the Wellington tree wētā, H. crassidens, but has a different number of chromosomes. All tree wētā (genus Hemideina) are nocturnal flightless herbivores. During the day they hide from predators in hollow branches and crevices. At night they search in trees for leaves, flowers and fruits to eat.

== Distribution and identification ==
Hemideina trewicki is common in forests and suburban gardens over most of the Hawke's Bay region. Within this range it overlaps with the Auckland tree wētā H. thoracica. The two species can be found sharing daytime refuge holes but hybridisation is limited to rare first generation hybrids. Hemideina trewicki has black and yellow bands on its abdominal tergites (as seen in the Wellington tree wētā H. crassidens) but has a pale pronotum with black marks as seen in H. thoracica. However, H. thoracica lacks the abdominal bands, and is more uniform body colour. All tree wētā have long antenna, spines on their hind legs and adults can bite. The number of prolateral spines on each hind tibea can be used to distinguish the Hawke's Bay tree wētā from the Auckland tree wētā: Hemideina trewicki has 8 spines and H. thoracica has 6 (or sometimes 7) spines on each hind tibea.

== Life cycle and mating ==
Tree wētā are hemimetabolous insects, meaning they hatch from eggs as small versions of adults. Eggs are laid in the soil and hatch after about 8 months without parental care. Over about 12 months nymphs grow and molt nine times before reaching full size (8–12 grams) and sexual maturity. Hemideina trewick are smaller than the sympatric H. thoracica and reach maturity earlier in the summer. During the late summer and autumn adult female tree wētā shelter together in the same tree cavities. Male wētā use chemical cues to find other adult wētā and fight for access to harems.

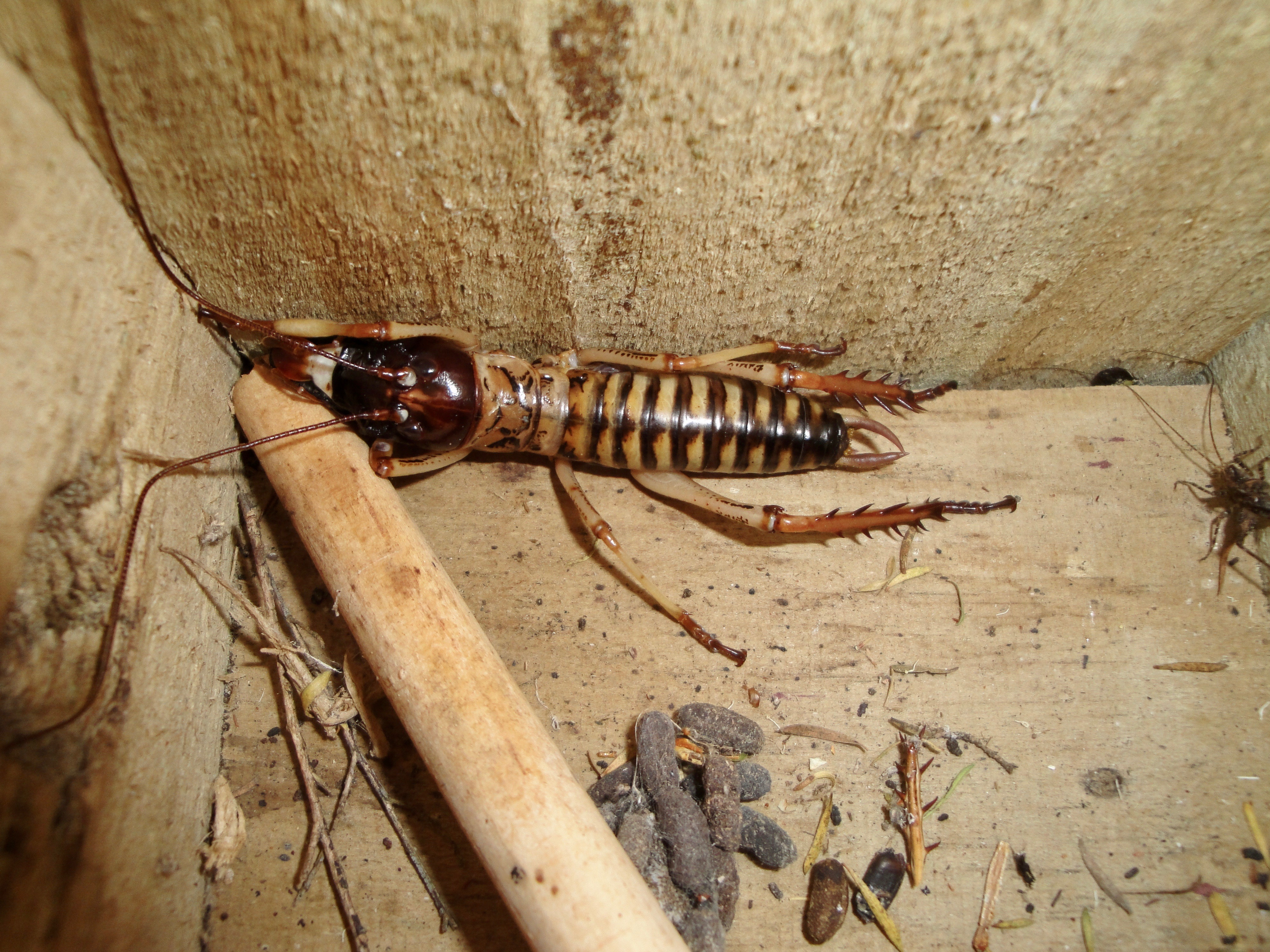
This adult male Hemideina trewicki is using a bird nesting box as a daytime refuge at the Cape Kidnappers Reserve, Hawkes Bay
