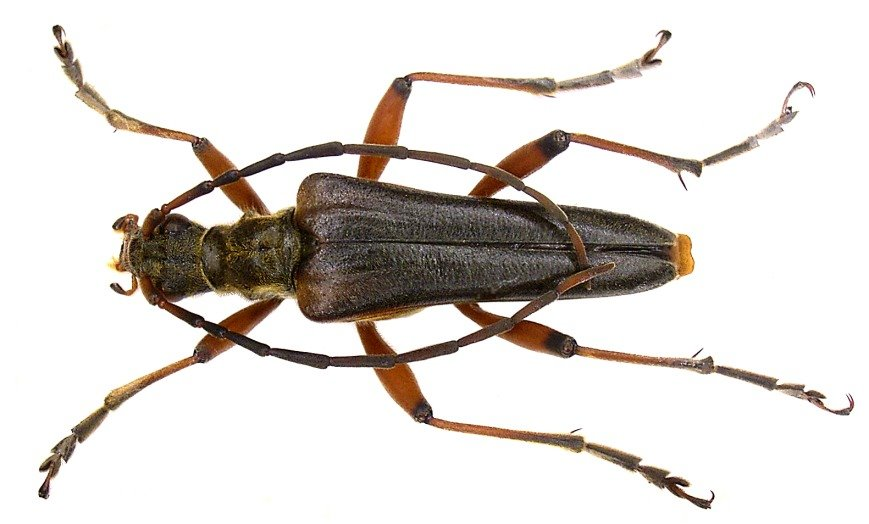
- Stenocerus meridianus

Scientific classification
- Domain: Eukaryota
- Kingdom: Animalia
- Phylum: Arthropoda
- Class: Insecta
- Order: Coleoptera
- Suborder: Polyphaga
- Infraorder: Cucujiformia
- Family: Anthribidae
- Tribe: Stenocerini
- Genus: Stenocerus; Schoenherr, 1826

= Stenocerus =

Genus of beetles

Stenocerus is a genus of fungus weevils in the beetle family Anthribidae. There are more than 20 described species in Stenocerus.

== Species ==
These 29 species belong to the genus Stenocerus:

- Stenocerus amazonae Jekel, 1855
- Stenocerus anatinus Perty, 1832
- Stenocerus angulicollis Jekel, 1855
- Stenocerus aspis Erichson, 1847
- Stenocerus blanchardi Jekel, 1855
- Stenocerus brunnescens Jekel, 1855
- Stenocerus collaris Gyllenhal, 1833
- Stenocerus frontalis Gyllenhal, 1833
- Stenocerus fulvitarsis Schoenherr, 1833
- Stenocerus garnotii Boisduval, 1835
- Stenocerus knullorum Sleeper, 1953
- Stenocerus longulus Jekel, 1855
- Stenocerus mexicanus Jekel, 1855
- Stenocerus migratorius Jekel, 1855
- Stenocerus nigritasis Jordan, 1895
- Stenocerus nigrotesselatus Blanchard, 1843
- Stenocerus nigrotessellatus Blanchard, 1846
- Stenocerus nubifer Schoenherr, 1823
- Stenocerus paraguayensis Jordan, 1895
- Stenocerus platalea Jordan, 1906
- Stenocerus sigillatus Jordan, 1906
- Stenocerus tesselatus Desmarest & E., 1842
- Stenocerus tessellatus Jekel, 1855
- Stenocerus testudo Jekel, 1855
- Stenocerus tuberculosus Blanchard, 1849
- Stenocerus variegatus Motschulsky, 1874
- Stenocerus varipes Fahraeus, 1839
- Stenocerus velatus Erichson, 1847
- Stenocerus verticalis Jekel, 1855
