= Des Helmore =

New Zealand artist and scientific illustrator

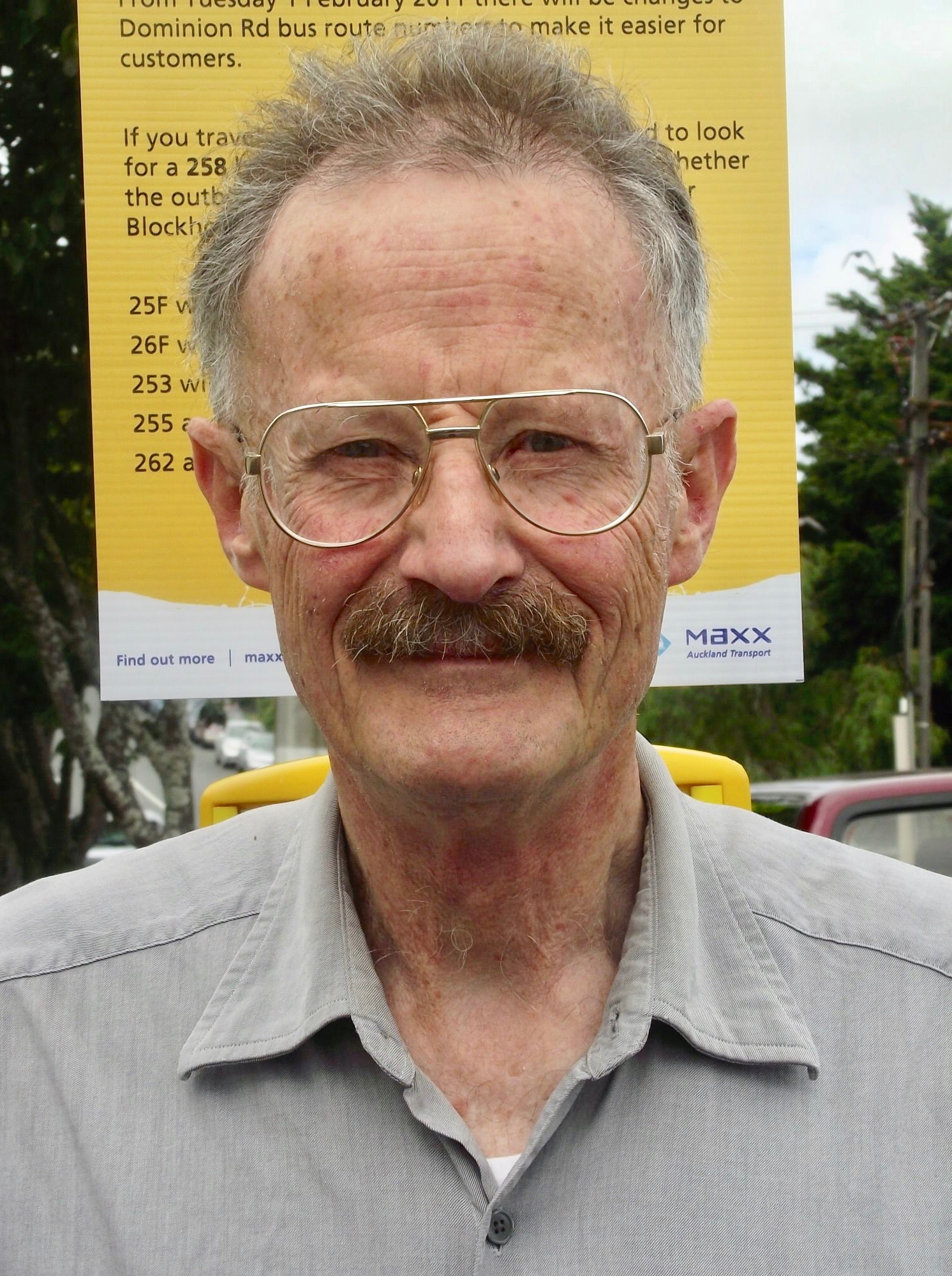
- Helmore in 2011
- Born: 1940 (age 85–86)
- Education: Ilam School of Fine Arts, Christchurch
- Occupations: Artist; Illustrator
- Known for: New Zealand Arthropod Collection

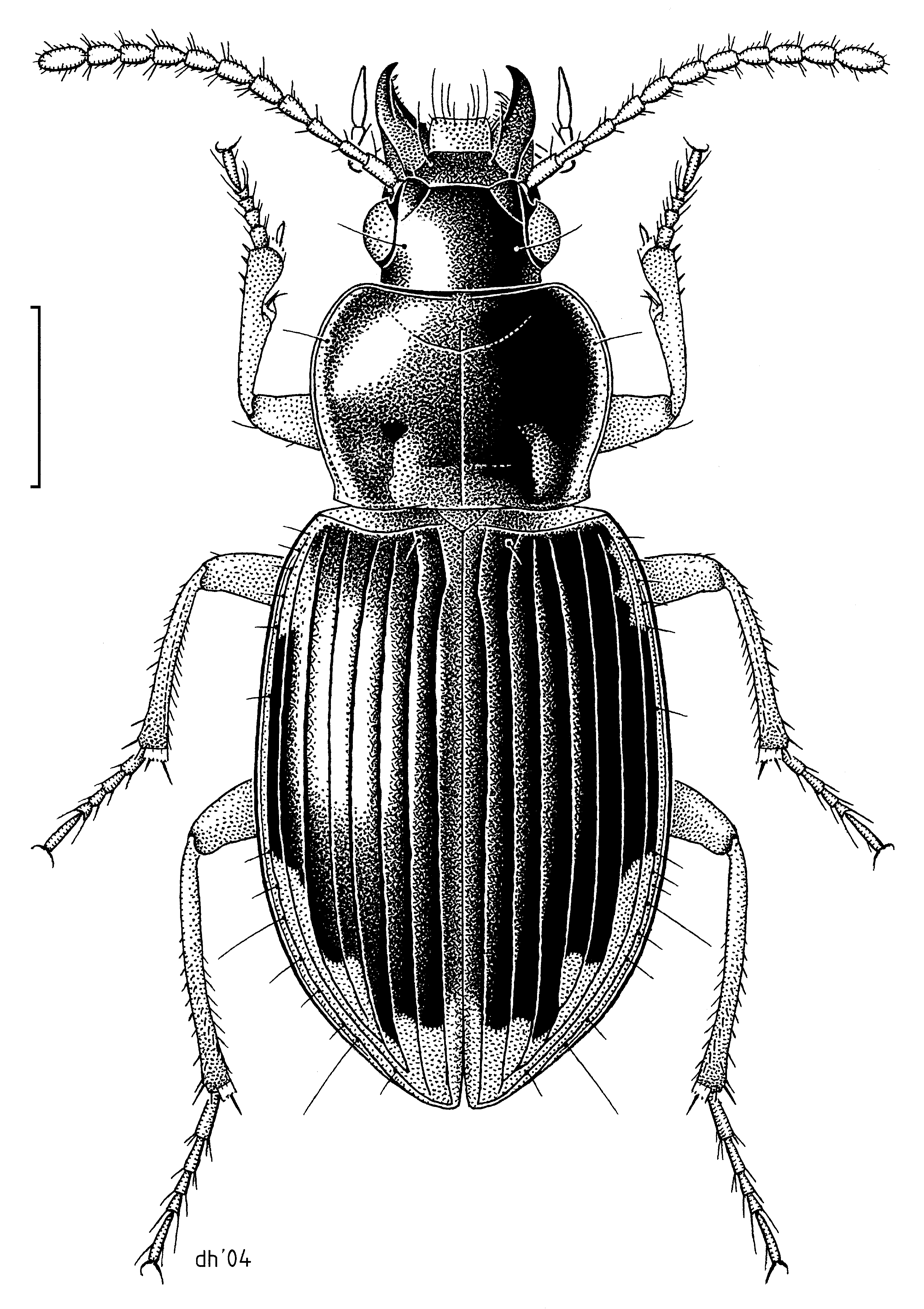
Drawing of Lecanomerus sharpi by Helmore, made in 2004 for the New Zealand Arthropod Collection

Desmond W. Helmore (born 1940) is a New Zealand artist and illustrator, known both for his fine art and for his scientific work depicting insects, not least illustrating the New Zealand Arthropod Collection. One of the country's most noted and prolific biological illustrators, over 1000 of his illustrations of insects were published in research papers from 1976 to 2006.

== Life and education ==
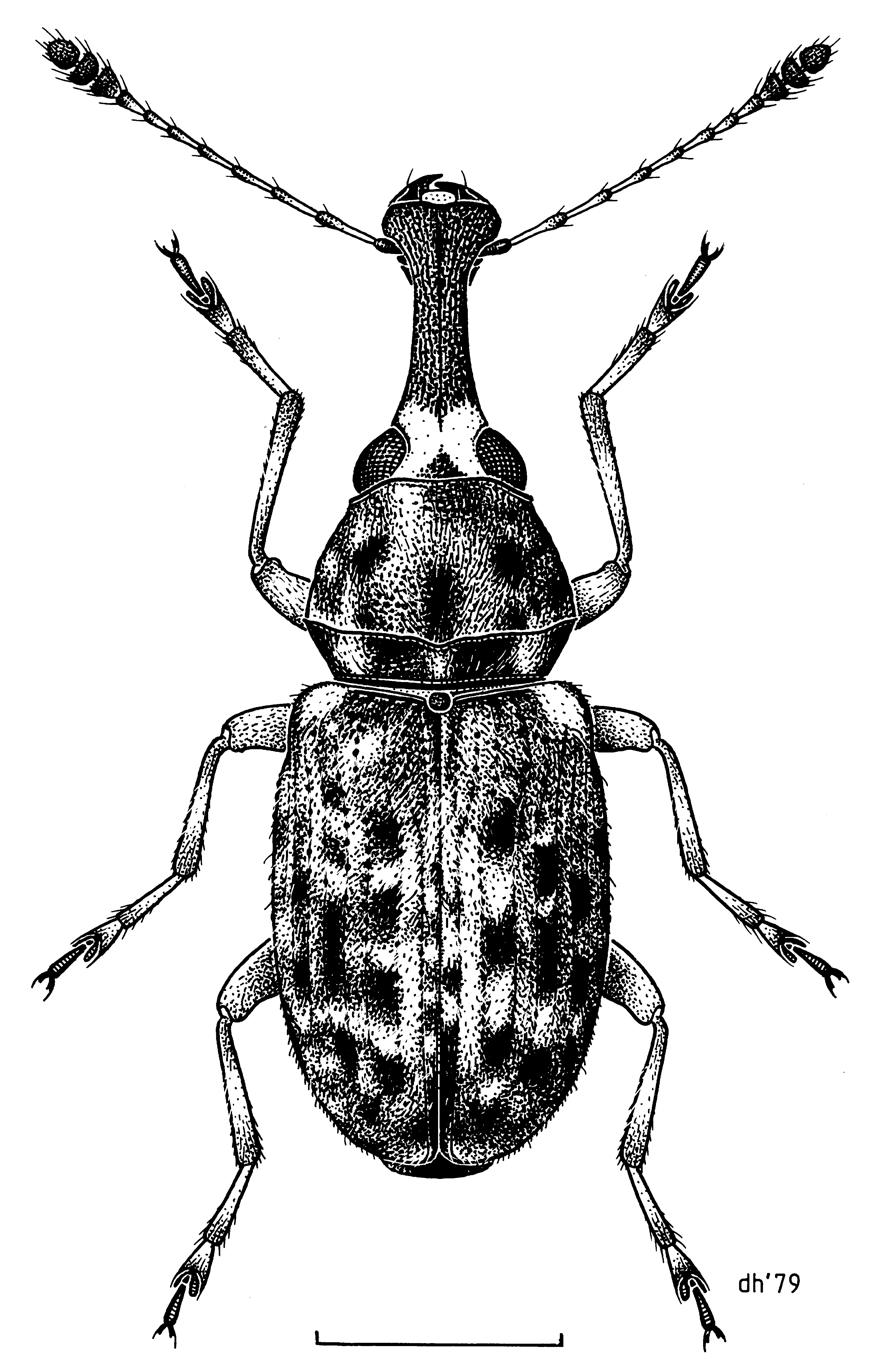
A 1979 Des Helmore drawing of the weevil Helmoreus sharpi; the genus was named after him.

Helmore was born in Takapau, Hawkes Bay, New Zealand, and lived there on a farm until age 12. Interested in drawing since childhood, he attended Christ's College in Christchurch, and then the Ilam School of Fine Arts at the University of Canterbury from 1959 to 1962, where he was taught by Rudi Gopas, Russell Clark, and Bill Sutton. His fellow students at Ilam included Dick Frizzell, Tony Fomison, and John Panting. In his survey of New Zealand art, Frizzell described Helmore as someone who "seemed to have already graduated from somewhere else. All that quiet abstract pondering. I [Frizzell] couldn't believe he knew what he was doing, because I certainly didn't." At this time Helmore, through beatnik culture, became interested in Zen Buddhism and Taoism. He won a life-painting prize, and graduated in 1963 with a Diploma of Fine Arts (Hons). After working in London from 1967 to 1969, Helmore returned to New Zealand and lived in Auckland for over 40 years. He moved to Hastings in 2018.

== Illustration ==
From 1967 to 1969 Helmore worked as a geographical illustrator at University College London where he learnt the technical aspects of creating maps and illustrations for publication. Upon returning to New Zealand in 1970 he was employed as an entomological illustrator at Canterbury Museum, Christchurch, working alongside the painter Tony Fomison. From 1971 to 1975 he worked as a graphic artist and graphic designer for NZBC Television and TV1 News in Christchurch, creating lettering, illustrations, and title sequences, but was unhappy with the daily deadlines.

In June 1975 Helmore moved to Auckland and worked as an entomological illustrator for the Systematics Section of Entomology Division, Department of Scientific and Industrial Research, until 1992, then for Invertebrate Systematics at Landcare Research from 1992 to 2006. Over these years he created over 1000 insect illustrations for scientific publications, particularly the Fauna of New Zealand series. The illustrations were created using a stereomicroscope with a camera lucida, and were drawn two to three times larger than final print size on illustration board with technical pens (or sometimes on scraperboard). Each took three or four days to complete.

His drawings have been described as "magnificent" and "exquisitely executed" by entomologists. The scientist Sir Charles Fleming wrote, "Des Helmore's drawings supply the need for pictures of entire insects felt by many New Zealand amateurs and interdisciplinary students, to an artistic standard few can hope to emulate." The entomologist Anthony Harris said, "Desmond Helmore's superb illustrations rank with the very best in the field – such as those of Arthur Smith, A. J. E. Terzi, and T. Nagatani."

Helmoreus, a genus of weevils, is named in his honour, "in recognition of his contribution to New Zealand entomology as a scientific illustrator". In 2014 a species of beetle, Sagola helmorei, was also named in his honour.

== Art ==
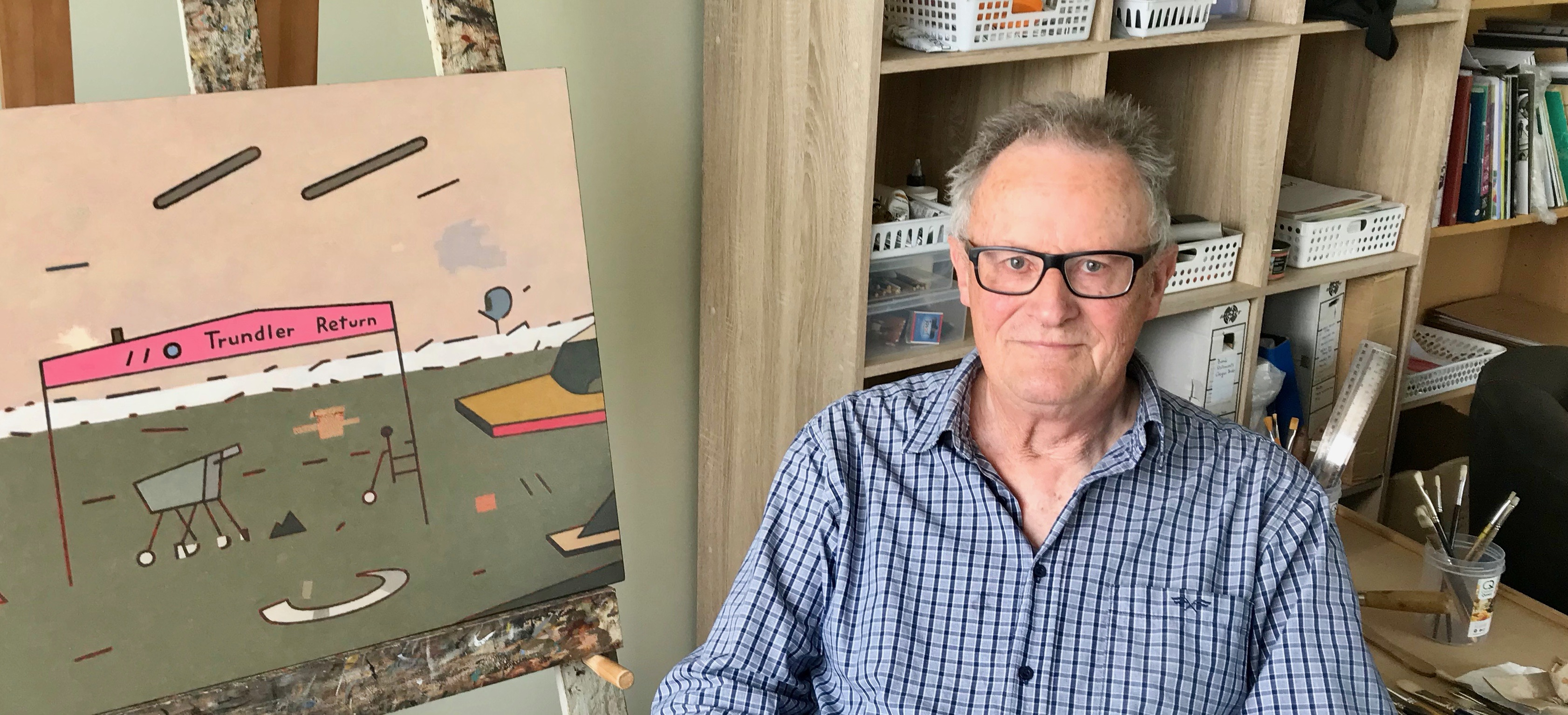
Helmore and his art, taken in 2018 in his Hastings home

Since leaving art school Helmore has continued painting. His work has been described by Dick Frizzell as having a "strangely dense atmosphere" and critic T.J. McNamara has referred to its "lonely vertical shapes" and "dim and strange" light. After being influenced by constructivism and cubism in the 1960s, he began painting depictions of rural landscapes after about 1985. Since 2000 his work has focussed on depictions of urban environments. His first solo show was in 1964 at the Hawke's Bay Art Gallery, Napier. In 1965 he received a Merit Award for the Manawatu Contemporary Art Competition, which was followed in 1966 by a solo exhibition at the Manawatu Art Gallery (now Te Manawa) in Palmerston North. While living in London he had a solo show at the B. H. Corner Gallery in 1968, and in 1972 he was a finalist in the Benson & Hedges Art Awards. Helmore has exhibited since 1990 in solo and group shows at the Auckland galleries Lopdell House, Claybrook, Anna Bibby, Jane Sanders Art, and nkb Gallery. He has also exhibited at Ramp Gallery in Hamilton, the Hastings City Art Gallery, and, in 2017, at Spa_ce Gallery, Napier.

Reviewing his 2011 solo exhibition at Jane Sanders Art, for The New Zealand Herald, T.J. McNamara said:

He is an artist who cultivates enigma. He takes ordinary places, landscapes and buildings and combines them into paintings that are truly strange yet curiously familiar... Helmore is an old-fashioned painter. His draughtsmanship is impeccable as witnessed by his accurate scientific illustrations but there is no virtuoso flourish of drawing in his paintings: his forms are simple and clear. Rather his virtuosity is shown in his handling of paint. Skies and surfaces are deftly brushed in and the handling works in with his individual palette of dark, shadowy colour to give tension and life to the work. The paintings in this exhibition have an extra energetic factor. Forms shatter into the sky and bits and pieces scatter about. Sometimes this makes the structure too open but generally the works are held together by strong compositions of angles, checks and balances... These are fine paintings, carefully made, evoking wastelands and familiar territories. They evoke emotions but with no subtext of social comment.

His work is in a number of collections, including those of Christchurch Art Gallery, the University of Canterbury, the Hocken Library, the Canterbury Society of Arts, and Hawke's Bay Art Gallery.

== Publications ==
- Deitz, L.L., and Helmore, Desmond W. (1979). "Illustrated key to the families and genera of planthoppers (Homoptera: Fulgoroidea) from the New Zealand sub-region". New Zealand Entomologist: 7(1). 11–19.
- Helmore, Desmond W. (1982). "Drawings of New Zealand insects". Bulletin of the Entomological Society of New Zealand. 8. Entomological Society of New Zealand. ISBN 978-0-477-06714-0. (contains 22 drawings of a variety of insects, with additional information about each drawing and an introduction on the purpose of the illustrations.)
