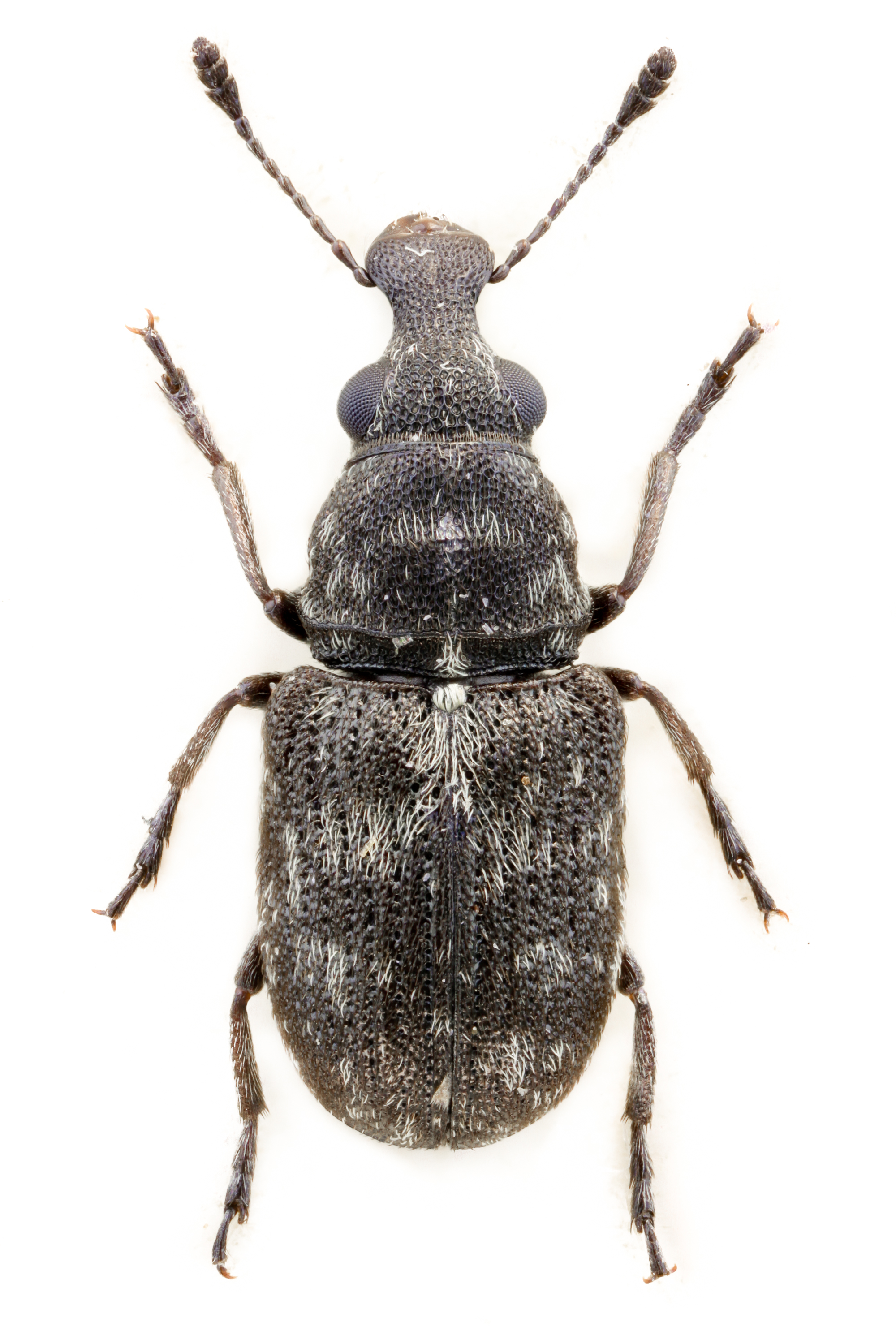
- Allandrus undulatus

Scientific classification
- Kingdom: Animalia
- Phylum: Arthropoda
- Class: Insecta
- Order: Coleoptera
- Suborder: Polyphaga
- Infraorder: Cucujiformia
- Family: Anthribidae
- Tribe: Stenocerini
- Genus: Allandrus; LeConte, 1876

= Allandrus =

Genus of beetles

Allandrus is a genus of fungus weevils in the beetle family Anthribidae. There are about nine described species in Allandrus.

== Species ==
These nine species belong to the genus Allandrus:

- Allandrus angulatus Jordan, 1906
- Allandrus bifasciatus LeConte, 1876
- Allandrus brevicornis Frost, 1920
- Allandrus comorensis Frieser & R., 1993
- Allandrus fuscipennis (Guillebeau, 1891)
- Allandrus indistinctus Jordan, 1904
- Allandrus populi Pierce, 1930
- Allandrus therondi (Tempère, 1954)
- Allandrus undulatus (Panzer & G.W.F., 1795)
