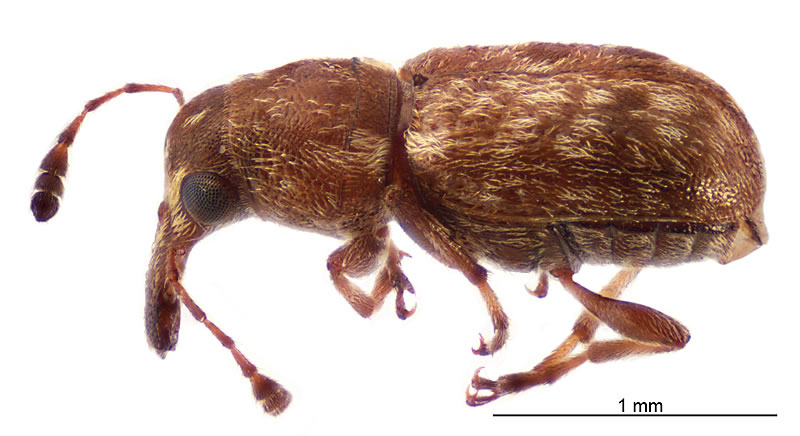
- Lateral view of Helmoreus sharpi

Scientific classification
- Kingdom: Animalia
- Phylum: Arthropoda
- Class: Insecta
- Order: Coleoptera
- Suborder: Polyphaga
- Infraorder: Cucujiformia
- Family: Anthribidae
- Tribe: Stenocerini
- Genus: Helmoreus; Holloway, 1982

Type species
- Anthribus sharpi Broun, 1880

= Helmoreus =

Genus of beetles

Helmoreus is a genus of fungus weevil which was circumscribed by the New Zealand entomologist Beverley Holloway in 1982. The generic name honors the scientific illustrator Des Helmore. It is found in New Zealand, Australia, and New Caledonia. It is in the tribe Stenocerini.

As of 1998, species include:

- Helmoreus agathidis Kuschel, 1998
- Helmoreus curvirostris Kuschel, 1998
- Helmoreus dugdalei Kuschel, 1998
- Helmoreus dufouri (Montrouzier, 1861)
- Helmoreus gressitti Kuschel, 1998
- Helmoreus nothofagi Kuschel, 1998
- Helmoreus sharpi (Broun, 1880)
- Helmoreus watti Kuschel, 1998
