= Stenocerini =

Scientific classification
- Domain: Eukaryota
- Kingdom: Animalia
- Phylum: Arthropoda
- Class: Insecta
- Order: Coleoptera
- Suborder: Polyphaga
- Infraorder: Cucujiformia
- Family: Anthribidae
- Subfamily: Anthribinae
- Tribe: Stenocerini; Kolbe, 1897

Tribe of beetles

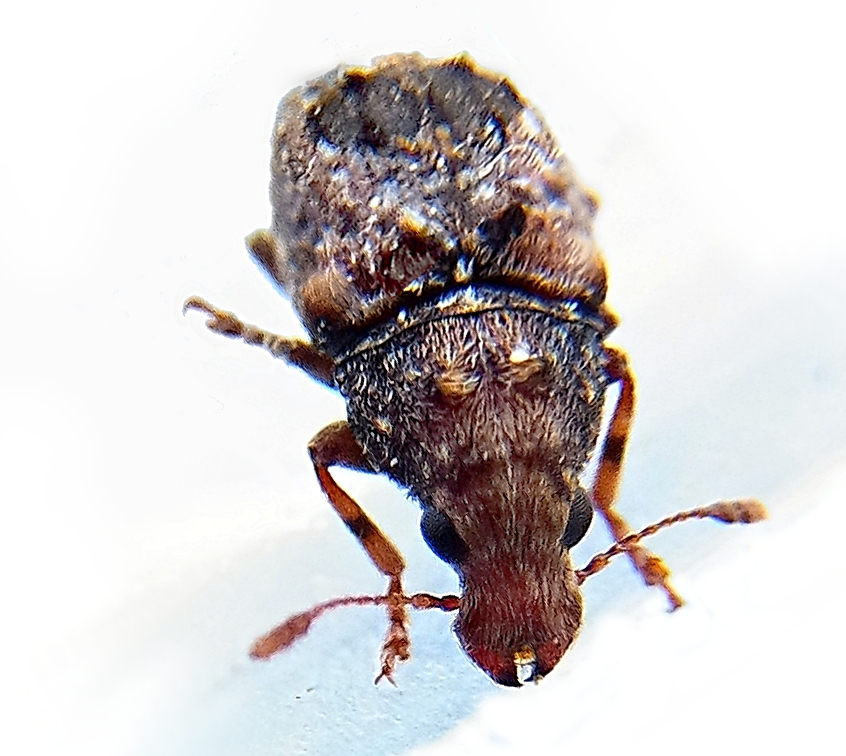
Enedreytes sepicola from France 20 km east of Clamecy

Stenocerini is a tribe of fungus weevils in the subfamily of beetles known as Anthribinae. There are at least sixteen genera in Stenocerini.

== Genera ==
The following genera are included in the tribe Stenocerini:

- Allandrus LeConte, 1876^{i c g b}
- Helmoreus Holloway, 1982
- Stenocerus Schoenherr, 1826^{i c g b}

Data sources: i = ITIS, c = Catalogue of Life, g = GBIF, b = Bugguide.net
