= Allandrus populi =

Scientific classification
- Domain: Eukaryota
- Kingdom: Animalia
- Phylum: Arthropoda
- Class: Insecta
- Order: Coleoptera
- Suborder: Polyphaga
- Infraorder: Cucujiformia
- Family: Anthribidae
- Genus: Allandrus
- Species: A. populi

Binomial name
- Allandrus populi Pierce, 1930

Species of weevil beetle

Allandrus populi is a species of fungus weevil in the beetle family Anthribidae. It is found in North America.
