= Allandrus bifasciatus =

Scientific classification
- Domain: Eukaryota
- Kingdom: Animalia
- Phylum: Arthropoda
- Class: Insecta
- Order: Coleoptera
- Suborder: Polyphaga
- Infraorder: Cucujiformia
- Family: Anthribidae
- Genus: Allandrus
- Species: A. bifasciatus

Binomial name
- Allandrus bifasciatus LeConte, 1876

Species of beetle

Allandrus bifasciatus is a species of fungus weevil in the beetle family Anthribidae. It is found in North America.
