= I.J. Berthe Hess =

French painter

I. J. Berthe Hess
- Born: Berthe Isapow; 4 November 1925; Paris, France
- Died: 6 April 1996 (aged 70); Bazas, France
- Movement: Bertisme
- Spouse: Adolph Hess
- Website: ijberthehess.com

I. J. Berthe Hess (4 November 1925 - 6 April 1996) was a French-born painter recognized for having created the Bertisme technique, which involves the "sculpting" by brush of great quantities of oil paint on canvas.

== Early life ==
Hess was born Berthe Isapow on 4 November 1925 in Belleville, Paris, France to Russian parents, Joseph and Chaja Isapow, who owned a leather factory and had four other children. On her father's side, she is related to Igor Stravinsky, the Russian composer. In 1933, when Berthe was eight years of age, they moved to the Porte des Lilas. During the second world war, their house was used by partisans and resistants, and Berthe was engaged in delivering messages to French Resistance leader, Jean Moulin. At the age of 24, she met a 21-year-old British citizen, Adolph Hess. They married immediately and in 1951, she gave birth to a daughter, the dancer and choreographer Mauricette Fortunée Hess, mother of singer, musician and graphic novel author, Sol Hess.

== Career ==
Les Chevaux Demi-Sauvages, by Hess, 1964

During her career, she both signed her work and authenticated it by a thumb print in the back of the canvas. Hess' Bertisme technique, named as such by the influential British art critic Peter Fuller, involved the "sculpting" by brush of great quantities of oil paint on canvas. As a result, the surface on most paintings by Hess are about two inches thick and took up to several years to dry. When seen up-close, the surface appears as a labyrinth of colour and light trapped in thick tunnels of paint and, when viewed from a certain distance, Hess' scenes progressively emerge from the canvas. The biggest paintings would take her a year to complete and seven years to dry. As Hess' production was greatly limited in terms of quantity by the time each painting took, her work is extremely rare. In addition the technique is so demanding and complex that it has been said to be impossible to forge, and all attempts to do so seem to have failed.

Due to its use of colour and light, Bertisme has often been described as being "One Step Beyond Impressionism", and while Hess has been compared to artists such as Turner, Pissarro, Manet, Rubens, Utrillo, and also Pollock, it has however been admitted by all that her work is unique. In 1969, Peter Fuller, who was to write a book about Hess before his tragic accident declared Hess' art as "… a real contribution to the art of this century."

Hess died 6 April 1996 in Bazas, France.

== The B. H. Corner Gallery ==
In 1967, the Hess family moved to London, England and opened the B. H. Corner Gallery, on Cathedral Place next to Paternoster Square and Saint Paul's Cathedral in the City of London. They used the gallery to promote the work of young contemporary artists, and in 1972 a part of it gave birth to a permanent exhibition of Hess' work. The gallery was a very popular venue, which saw a procession of all kinds of visitors, including show-business stars, politicians, artists and writers, and was a frequent hangout for all strata of the City's population. Adolph Hess ran the gallery until his death of multiple sclerosis in 1977 after which Berthe and her daughter Mauricette continued his work until 1987 when it had to close due to redevelopment of Paternoster Square.
