= Chromosomal polymorphism =

In genetics, chromosomal polymorphism is a condition where one species contains members with varying chromosome counts or shapes. Polymorphism is a general concept in biology where more than one version of a trait is present in a population.

In some cases of differing counts, the difference in chromosome counts is the result of a single chromosome undergoing fission, where it splits into two smaller chromosomes, or two undergoing fusion, where two chromosomes join to form one.

This condition has been detected in many species. Trichomycterus davisi, for example, is an extreme case where the polymorphism was present within a single chimeric individual.

It has also been studied in alfalfa, shrews, Brazilian rodents, and an enormous variety of other animals and plants. In one instance it has been found in a human.

Another process resulting in differing chromosomal counts is polyploidy. This results in cells which contain multiple copies of complete chromosome sets.

Possessing chromosomes of varying shapes is generally the result of a chromosomal translocation or chromosomal inversion.

In a translocation, genetic material is transferred from one chromosome to another, either symmetrically or asymmetrically (a Robertsonian translocation).

In an inversion, a segment of a chromosome is flipped end-for-end.

== Implications for speciation ==
All forms of chromosomal polymorphism can be viewed as a step towards speciation. Polymorphisms will generally result in a level of reduced fertility, because some gametes from one parent cannot successfully combine with all gametes of the other parent. However, when both parents contain matching chromosomal patterns, this obstacle does not occur. Further mutations in one group will not flow as rapidly into the other group as they do within the group in which it originally occurred.

Further mutations can also cause absolute infertility. If an interbreeding population contains one group in which (for example) chromosomes A and B have fused, and another population in which chromosomes B and C have fused, both populations will be able to interbreed with the parent population. However, the two subpopulations will not be able to breed successfully with each other if the doubling of chromosome B is fatal. Similar difficulties will occur for incompatible translocations of material.
