= Penwiper =

Penwiper is a common name that can refer to a number of plant species in different nations.

In Britain and Africa it usually refers to Kalanchoe marmorata.

In New Zealand it usually refers to one of the species of alpine plants of the genus Notothlaspi - usually Notothlaspi rosulatum.

The name refers to the layered, dark-blotched leaves, which appear ink-spattered like penwipers, cloth blotting papers used to clean the nibs of early ink pens.

== Gallery ==
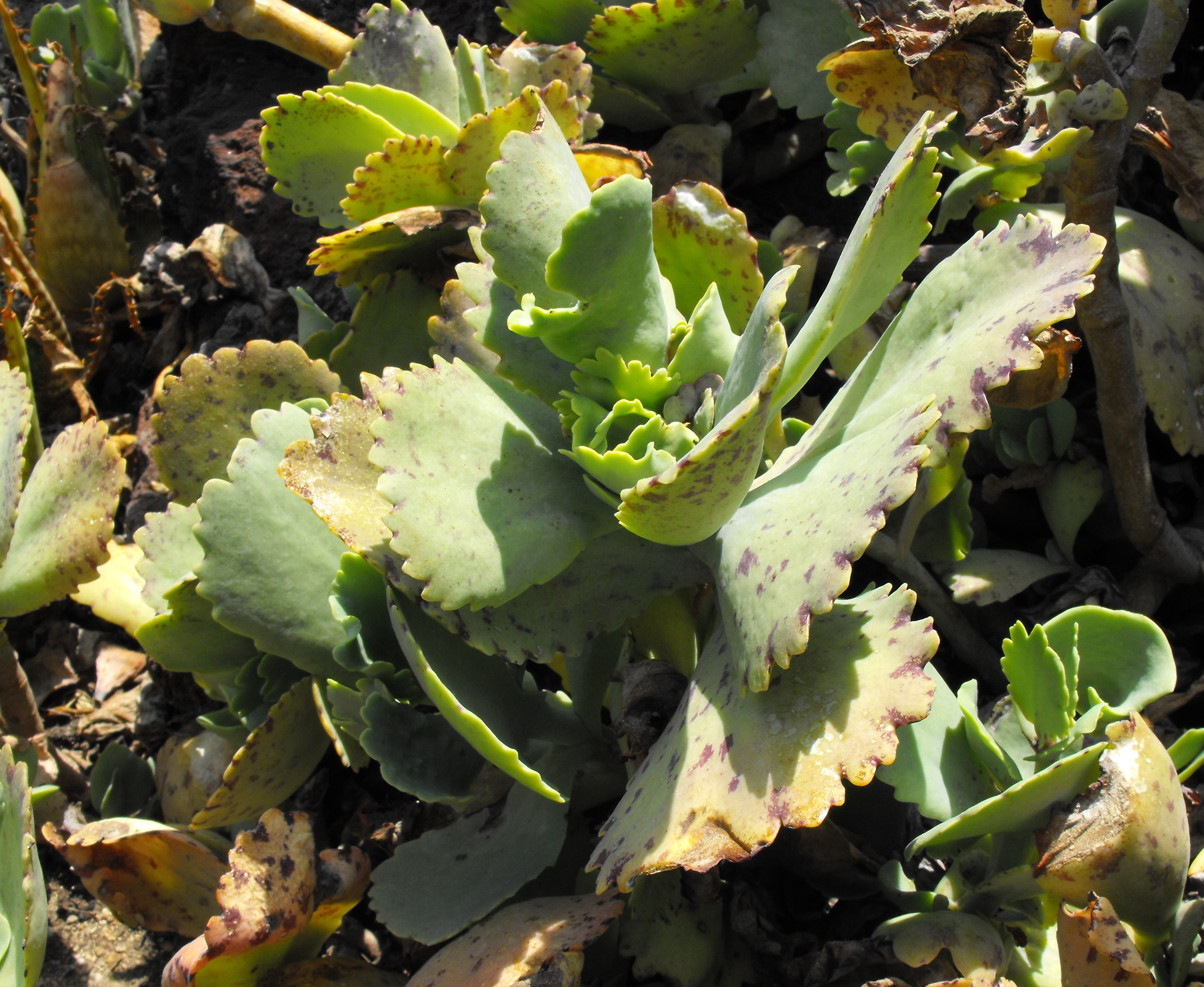
Penwiper plant
Kalanchoe marmorata

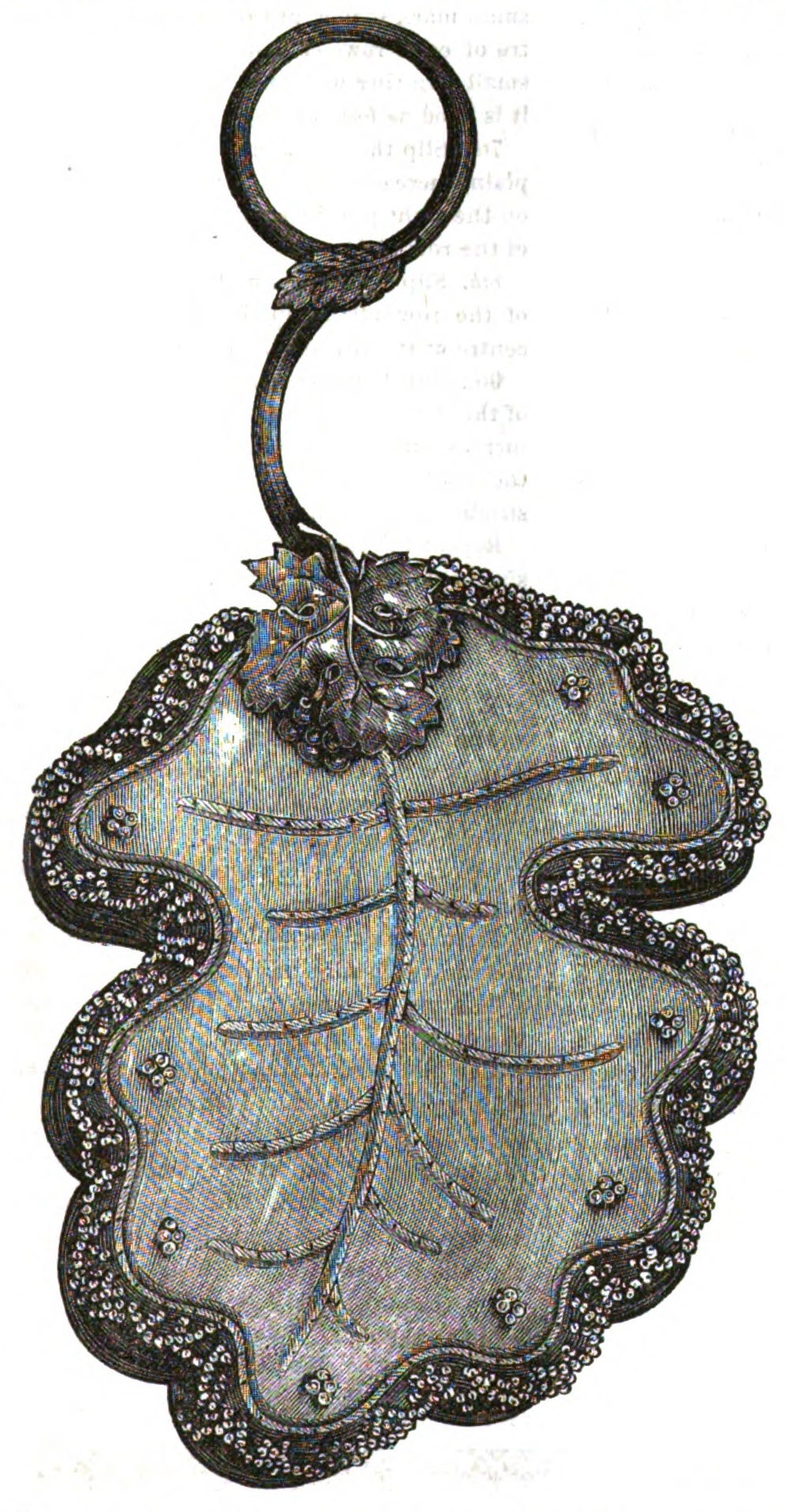
Antique penwiper
