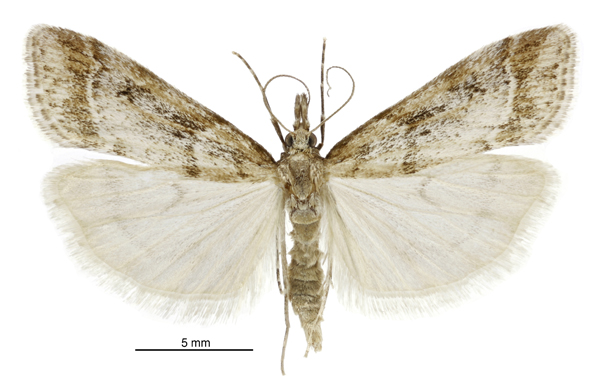
- Male

Scientific classification
- Kingdom: Animalia
- Phylum: Arthropoda
- Clade: Pancrustacea
- Class: Insecta
- Order: Lepidoptera
- Family: Crambidae
- Genus: Eudonia
- Species: E. chalara

Binomial name
- Eudonia chalara (Meyrick, 1901)

Synonyms
- Scoparia chalara Meyrick, 1901

= Eudonia chalara =

Species of moth endemic to New Zealand

Eudonia chalara is a moth in the family Crambidae. It was first described by Edward Meyrick in 1901. It is endemic to New Zealand and is found in the South Island. In 1950 the New Zealand entomologist George Hudson stated this species also occurs on the coastal hills near Sinclair Head in the lower North Island. E. chalara frequents open spaces ranging from lowland to alpine habitat. The larvae of this species are thought to feed on mosses. Adults are on the wing from November until February and have a habit of resting on the branches of Discaria toumatou.

== Taxonomy ==
This species was first described by Edward Meyrick in 1901 and originally named Scoparia chalara. George Hudson discussed and illustrated this species under the name Scoparia chalara in his 1928 book The butterflies and moths of New Zealand. In 1988 John S. Dugdale placed this species in the genus Eudonia. The male holotype, collected by Hudson at Mount Cook, is held at the Natural History Museum, London.

== Description ==
Illustration of male.

Live E. chalara.

Meyrick described the species as follows:

♂♀. 23-25 mm. Head and thorax whitish-ochreous, sometimes mixed with fuscous and whitish. Palpi 3 1/4, whitish-ochreous mixed with fuscous, white towards base beneath. Antennal ciliations in ♂ 1/2. Forewings elongate, posteriorly dilated, apex obtuse, termen almost straight, oblique, rounded beneath ; whitish-ochreous, more or less mixed or tinged with brownish-ochreous and sometimes with whitish, and in dise with dark fuscous ; first and second lines whitish, usually very indistinct, first right-angled in middle, usually nearly obsolete, posteriorly obscurely dark-edged, second nearly straight, parallel to termen, slightly sinuate inwards below costa; orbicular indicated by an undefined dark fuscous longitudinal mark ; claviform obsolete ; discal 8-shaped, obscurely outlined with dark fuscous ; subterminal line indicated by cloudy whitish suffusion along termen or obsolete ; a more or less distinct series of dark fuscous terminal dots: cilia whitish-fuscous, with two cloudy dark fuscous lines. Hindwings 1 !/3, whitish-ochreous, brassy-tinged ; cilia whitish, base ochreous-tinged.

E. chalara is very similar in appearance to Eudonia octophora. E. chalara can be distinguished from that species by its pale colouring, much straighter second line of fore-wings, and absence of dusky brownish-grey shading along the outer edge of its rear pair of wings. Eudonia legnota can be distinguished as it is much smaller and more distinctly marked.

== Distribution ==
This species is endemic to New Zealand and is found in the South Island. Hudson stated this species also occurs on the coastal hills near Sinclair Head in the North Island.

== Habitat and hosts ==
E. chalara is a lowland to alpine species that inhabits open areas. It has also been observed in native fescue grassland that is interspersed with native shrubs. Larvae are thought to feed on mosses.

== Behaviour ==
Adults are on the wing from November to February. Adults have a habit of resting in the branches of Discaria toumatou.
