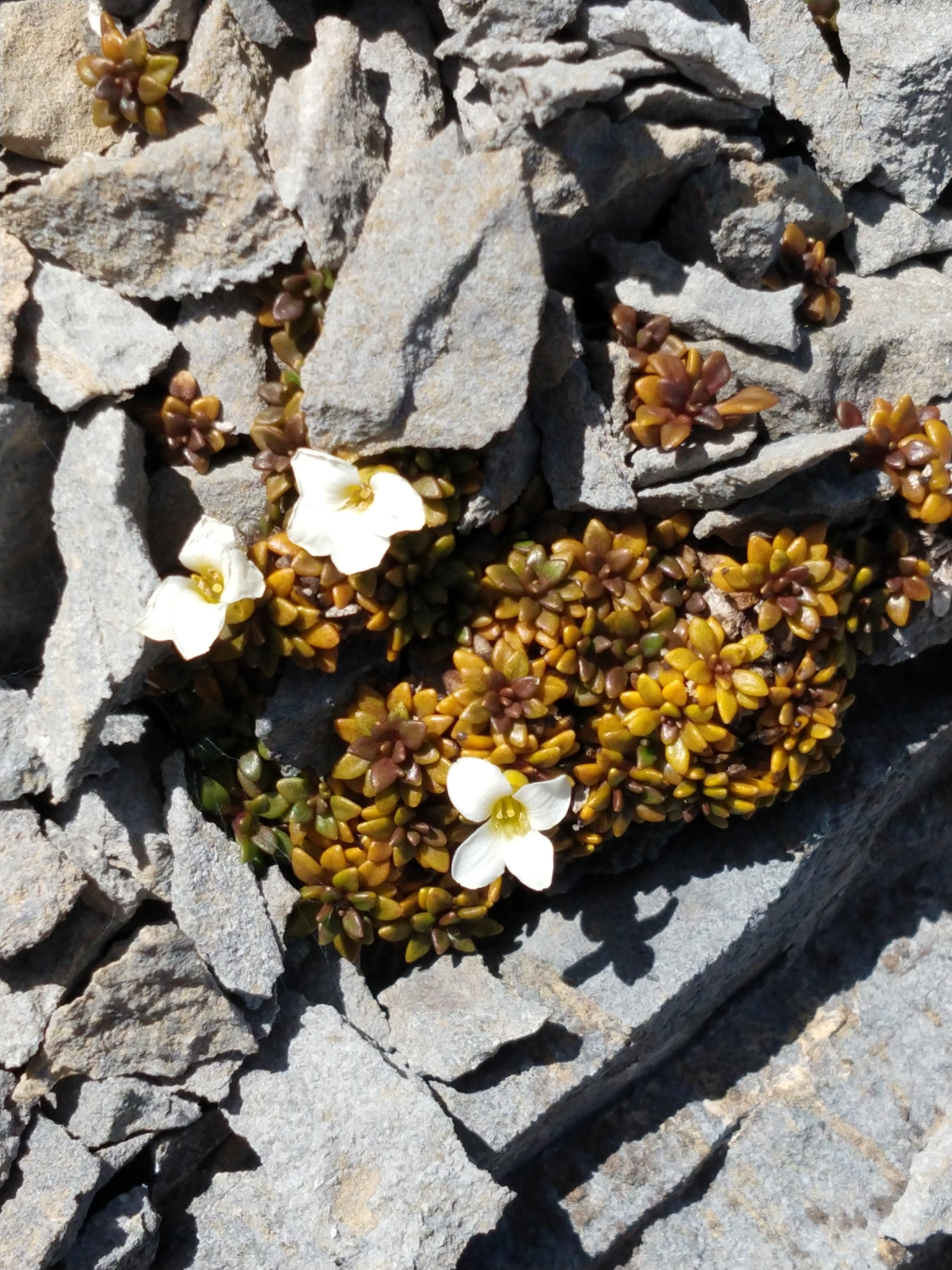
- Notothlaspi australe in Kahurangi National Park

Conservation status
- Not Threatened (NZ TCS)

Scientific classification
- Kingdom: Plantae
- Clade: Tracheophytes
- Clade: Angiosperms
- Clade: Eudicots
- Clade: Rosids
- Order: Brassicales
- Family: Brassicaceae
- Genus: Notothlaspi
- Species: N. australe

Binomial name
- Notothlaspi australe (Hook.f.) Hook.f.

Synonyms
- Notothlaspi australe var. stellatum Kirk; Thlaspi australe Hook.f.

= Notothlaspi australe =

Species of flowering plant

Notothlaspi australe is a species of alpine Brassicaceae from New Zealand. These species are often called penwipers, which can apply as a generic term for this species as well. It is endemic to the South Island of New Zealand.

== Description ==
Notothlaspi australe is a small plant, with radiating leaves from a central stem. The leaves have a small pointed tip, and are green to brown. They are "3.0–6.5 mm wide, ovate to broadly ovate and with 1–6 teeth". The form is prostrate.

The flowers are small and white, with a single flower forming from the axil of the uppermost stem. Young plants may form a single rosette, but with time these will branch out to form multiple, matted rosettes.

Notothlaspi australe is perennial, unlike Notothlaspi rosulatum.

== Distribution and habitat ==
Notothlaspi australe is known exclusively on to the northern mountain ranges of the South Island of New Zealand, where it is present in alpine and subalpine habitats. Notothlaspi australe does not tend to live on the subranges that are composed of ultramafic rock like Maungakura / Red Hill, where the newly described Notothlaspi viretum dominates instead.

== Ecology ==
Notothlaspi australe is one of the few species that lives in plant communities on barren alpine rock and scree fields, along with plants like Anistome imbricata, Dracophyllum pronum, Veronica pulvinaris, and grasses like Poa colensoi.

== Taxonomy and etymology ==
Notothlaspi australe contains the following varieties:

- Notothlaspi australe stellatum
- Notothlaspi australe australe

The type specimen is from Gordon's Knob, in Nelson, New Zealand. The species name australe comes from the Latin adjective australis, and means 'southern'.

== Conservation ==
Notothlaspi australe is considered Not Threatened, but it has two qualifiers attached, DPS and DPT, both of which indicate that more data is needed for this species.
