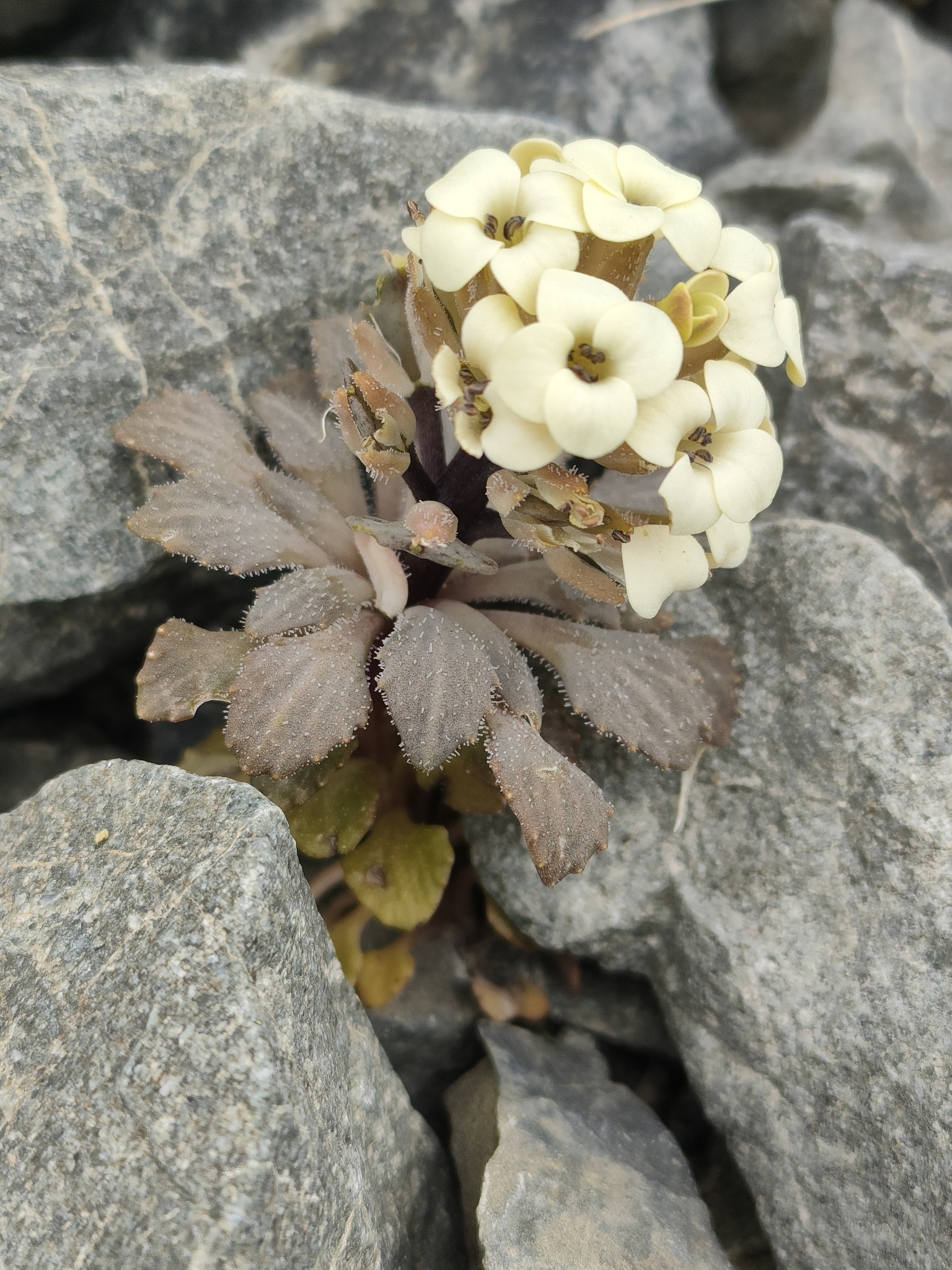
- A Notothlaspi rosulatum in bloom in Craigieburn Forest Park

Conservation status
- Not Threatened (NZ TCS)

Scientific classification
- Kingdom: Plantae
- Clade: Tracheophytes
- Clade: Angiosperms
- Clade: Eudicots
- Clade: Rosids
- Order: Brassicales
- Family: Brassicaceae
- Genus: Notothlaspi
- Species: N. rosulatum

Binomial name
- Notothlaspi rosulatum Hook.f., 1864

= Notothlaspi rosulatum =

Species of plant

Notothlaspi rosulatum, or penwiper, is a species of alpine plant, endemic to New Zealand. It is the logo of the Canterbury Botanical Society.

== Description ==
A short small herb, with circular form and small flattened leaves with denticulate margins, and flat gray seedpods on top.

== Distribution and habitat ==
Its current known range is in the Southern Alps of the South Island in New Zealand. It is not threatened. It is known from alpine scree slopes up to 1850 m.

This species overlaps with two others species in its genera, N. viretum and N. australe, although it is the only one found in the central and southern alps.
