= Gordons Knob =

Alpine summit near Nelson, New Zealand

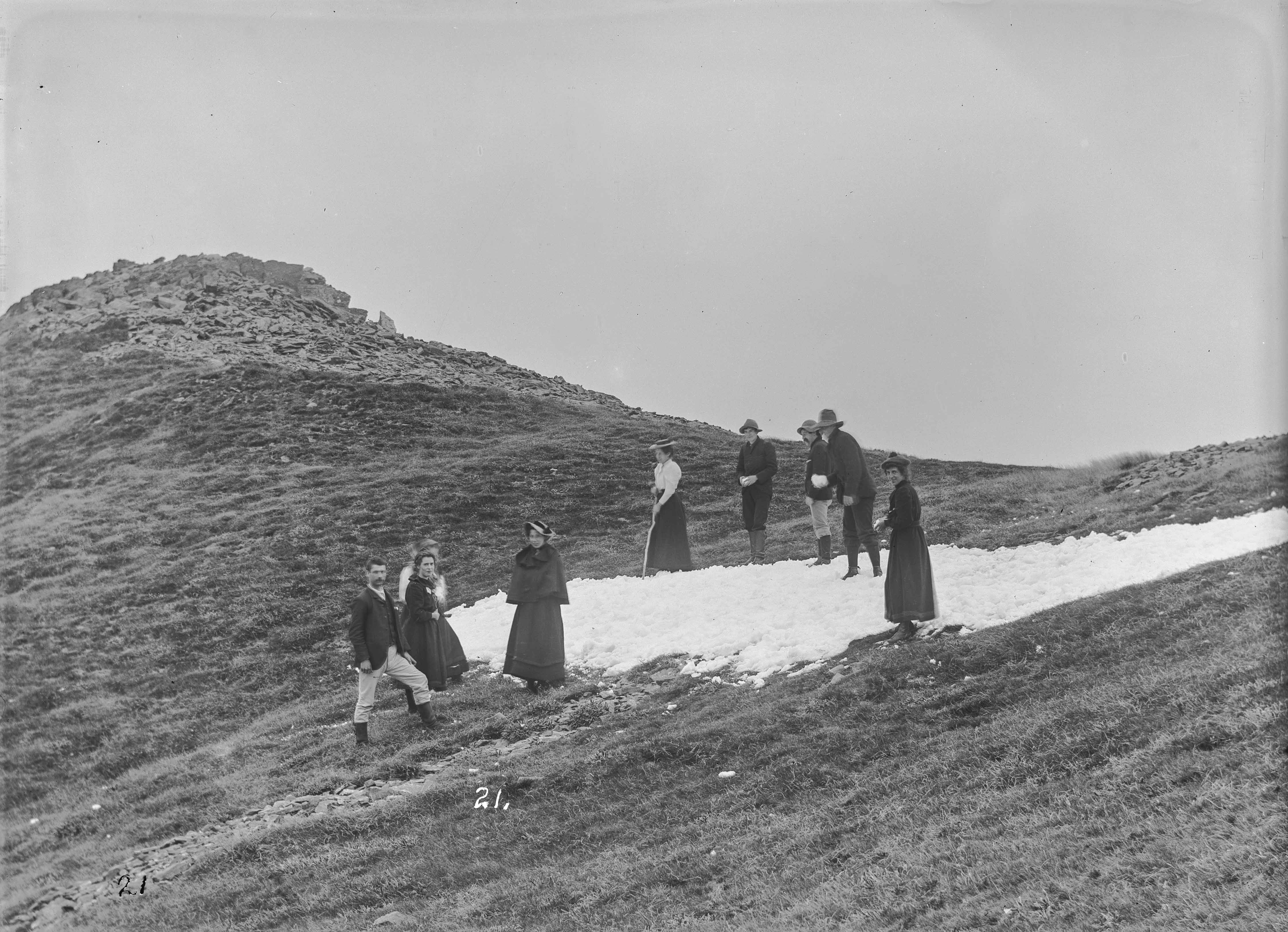
- Snow Scene on Gordon’s Knob. Nelson Provincial Museum, F G Gibbs Collection: 321435.

Highest point
- Elevation: 1,592 m (5,223 ft)
- Coordinates: 41.604°S 172.937°E

Naming
- Etymology: After William Gordon Bell

Geography
- Country: New Zealand
- District: Tasman District
- Parent range: Gordon Range
- Topo map: Land Information New Zealand NZTopo50-BR25 948942

Climbing
- First ascent: 16 November 1895

Gordons Knob is an alpine summit near Nelson, in New Zealand. The summit is 1592m in elevation.

It was named after William Gordon Bell, who bought land in the area, near Motueka, in 1852. The summit is near the place where the penwiper Notothlaspi australe was first collected.

== Hiking ==
The ridge can be biked, and is trampable in winter, although it is alpine and may be dangerous.

The first known successful summit of Gordons Knob was at least as early as 16 November 1895, when Frederick Gibbs recorded a photo of some of his friends and family standing on a snowfield near the summit.

The Te Araroa track passes slightly to the east of Gordons Knob. Hunter's Hut is a tramping hut directly to the east which can be used as a base camp an ascent.
