= Korowai / Torlesse Tussocklands Park =

Protected area in New Zealand

Coordinates: 43°17′40″S 171°43′20″E

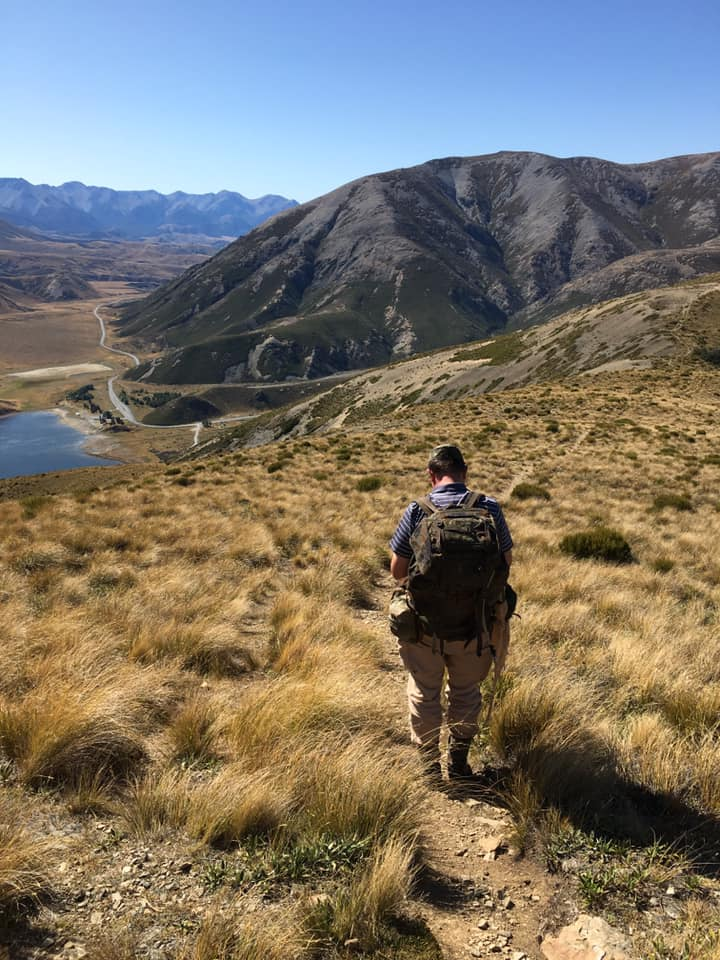
Walking down from Trig 'M'

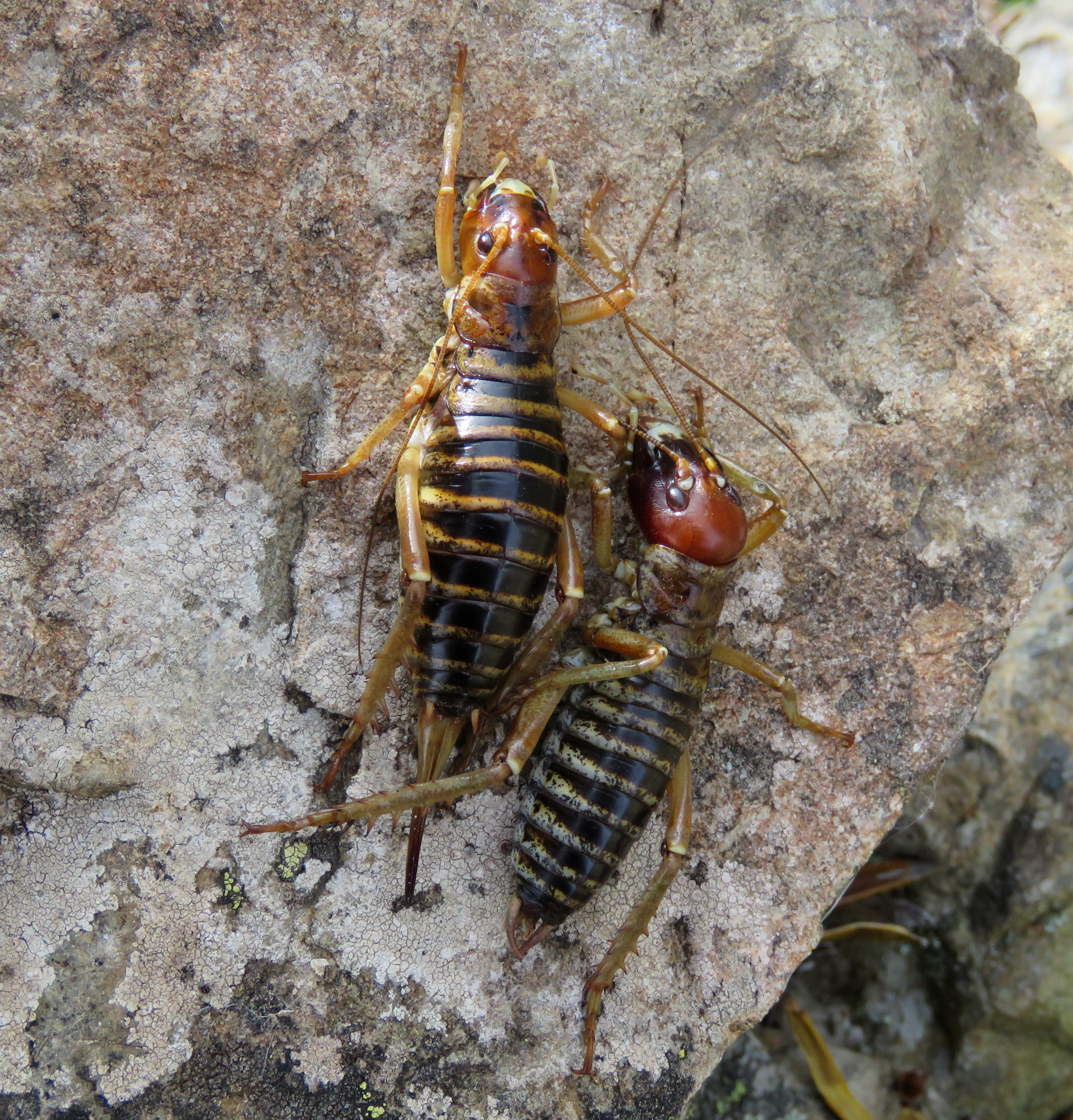
Pair of Mountain Stone Weta (Hemideina maori) on rock along one of the park's tracks. This is one of many native insect species that can be seen within the park.

Korowai / Torlesse Tussocklands Park is a protected area in Canterbury, New Zealand. Covering around 21,000 hectares, it is located on both sides of State Highway 73, from east of Porters Pass to south of Castle Hill Village.

The park is important for the preservation of South Island high country ecosystems. It contains:

- mountain beech forest
- species-rich shrublands
- unusual scree plants such as vegetable sheep, penwiper, Haast's scree buttercup, scree lobelia, and scree pea
- native grasshoppers, wētā, cockroaches, lizards and butterflies
- grassland birds such as kea, New Zealand falcon, and New Zealand pipit
- forest birds such as tomtit, rifleman, and pipipi

Trig 'M' is a notable track for the Korowai / Torlesse Tussocklands Park; it is an easy climb through subalpine scrub to a windy summit. From here there is a panoramic view north to the Craigieburn Range, east to Christchurch, and southwest to Lake Coleridge.
