= Maungakura / Red Hill =

Mountain in Mount Richmond Forest Park, New Zealand

Highest point
- Elevation: 1,791 m (5,876 ft)
- Coordinates: 41°37′37″S 173°03′29″E

Geography
- Location: Marlborough District and Tasman District, New Zealand
- Parent range: Richmond Range

Geology
- Mountain type: Ultramafic plateau

Climbing
- Easiest route: Te Araroa track

Maungakura / Red Hill is a culturally significant and geologically distinct mountain in Mount Richmond Forest Park, on the boundary of Marlborough and Tasman districts, New Zealand. The hill is 1,791 metres (5,876 ft) in height, and is the summit of the Richmond Range. The mountain is important to Ngāti Apa ki te Rā Tō, Ngāti Koata, Ngāti Kuia, Ngāti Rārua, Ngāti Tama ki Te Tau Ihu, Rangitāne o Wairau and Te Atiawa o Te Waka-a-Māui. It is on the official list of New Zealand places with dual names.

The plateau is made up of limestone, with some serpentine and heavy metal deposits in the ultramafic plateau. The soils near the alpine region allow a unique ecology for some plant communities; for instance, Notothlaspi viretum is known to grow in the area.

The Te Araroa track passes over Red Hills at the northern and southern end of the range, where there is also a hut for trampers.
