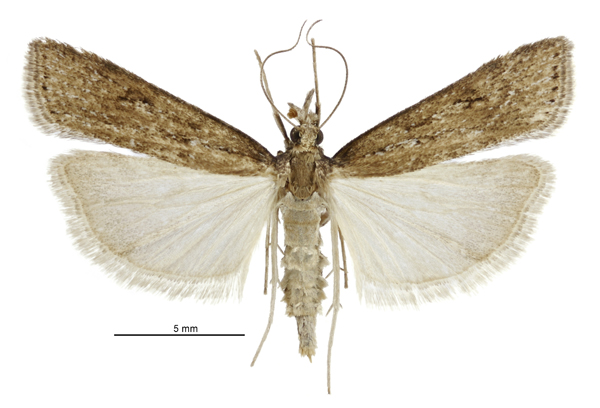
- Female
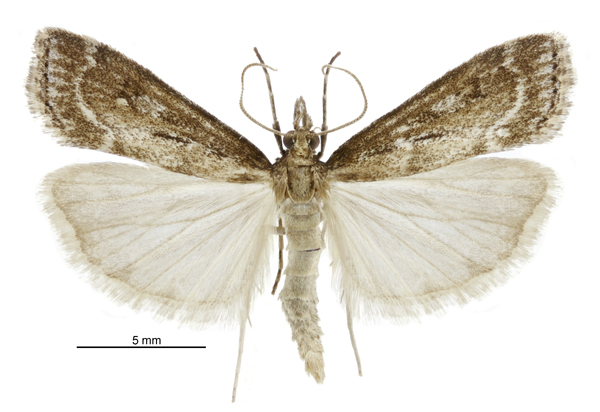
- Male

Scientific classification
- Kingdom: Animalia
- Phylum: Arthropoda
- Clade: Pancrustacea
- Class: Insecta
- Order: Lepidoptera
- Family: Crambidae
- Genus: Eudonia
- Species: E. octophora

Binomial name
- Eudonia octophora (Meyrick, 1884)

Synonyms
- Xeroscopa octophora Meyrick, 1884; Scoparia octophora (Meyrick, 1884)

= Eudonia octophora =

Species of moth

Eudonia octophora is a species of moth belonging to the family Crambidae. It was named by Edward Meyrick in 1884. It is endemic to New Zealand and has been observed in both the North and South Islands as well as the Chatham Islands. This species is known to inhabit wetlands and its larval plant host are species within the genus Juncus. Adults are commonly on the wing from October until May and are attracted to light.

== Taxonomy ==
This species was first described by Edward Meyrick in 1884 and originally named Xeroscopa octophora. He described this species more fully in 1885. He used species collected at various locations in the lower half of the South Island. George Hudson discussed and illustrated this species under the name Scoparia octophora, though his illustration was regarded by John S. Dugdale as dubious. In 1988 Dugdale placed this species in the genus Eudonia. The male lectotype specimen, collected at Castle Hill, Canterbury, is held at the Natural History Museum, London.

== Description ==
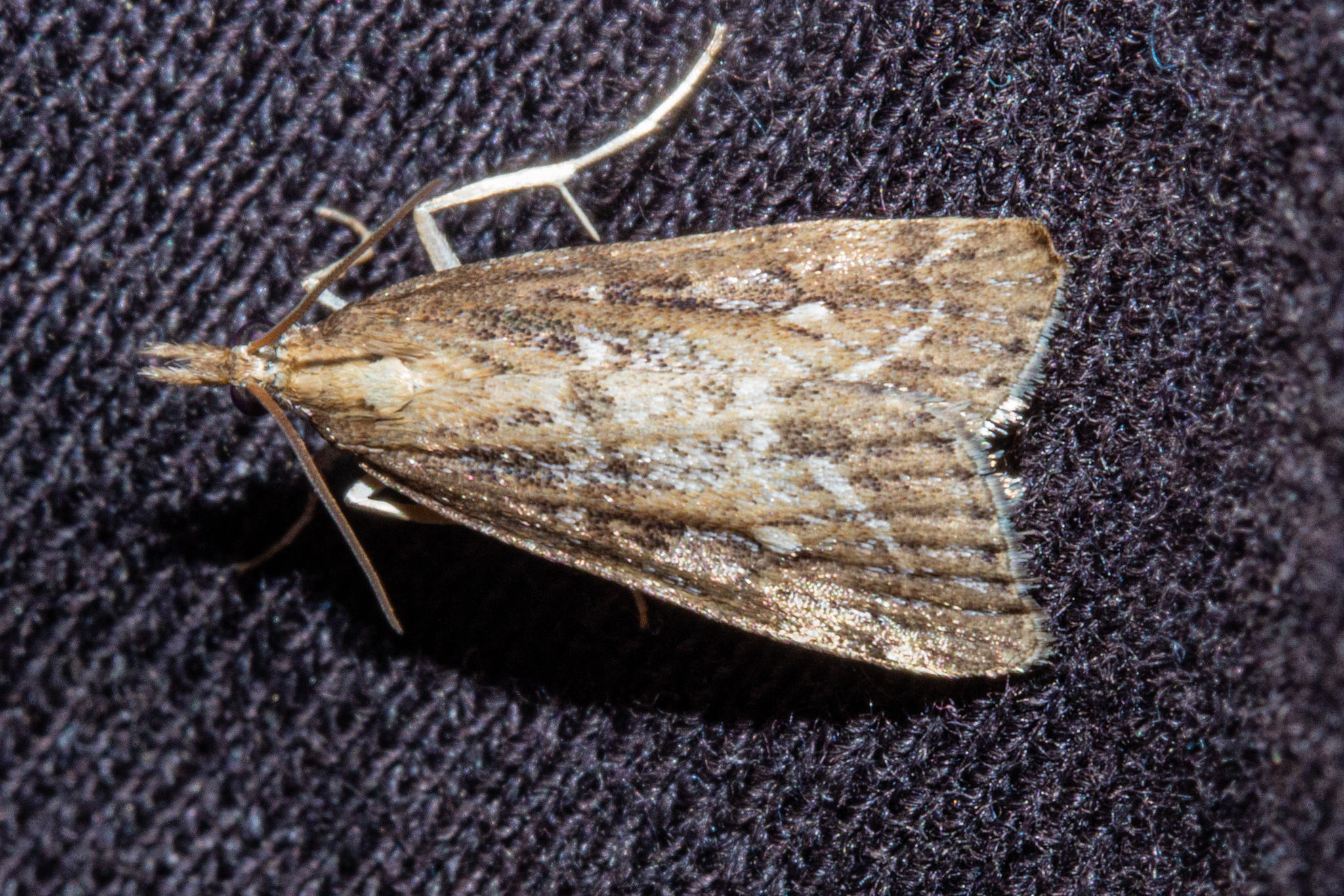
Live E. octophora.

Meyrick described this species as follows:

Male, female. — 22-24 mm. Head and thorax brownish-ochreous, shoulders irrorated with dark fuscous. Palpi 3 1/2, dark fuscous, mixed with white above, basal joint white. Antennae fuscous; ciliations 1/2. Abdomen ochreous-whitish. Legs whitish-ochreous, anterior pair suffused with dark fuscous. Forewings rather elongate, triangular, costa slightly arched, apex round-pointed, kind margin slightly sinuate, rather oblique; brownish-ochreous, more or less irrorated with dark fuscous, generally forming dark lines on veins, and with a few white scales; first line obscurely pale, posteriorly indistinctly dark-margined, curved, indented, hardly oblique; orbicular and claviform suffused, dark fuscous, generally obscure; reniforrn 8-shaped, somewhat blackish-margined, upper half ochreous, lower half white; second line whitish, distinct, dark-margined, moderately curved in middle; a hindmarginal row of black clots : cilia ochreous-whitish, with two dark grey lines. Hindwings 1 2/5, ochreous-grey-whitish, postmedian line and apex obscurely greyer; cilia ochreous-white, with a faint grey line. Recognizable by the brownish-ochreous ground-colour and well-defined reniforrn, with the lower half white.

== Distribution ==
This species is endemic to New Zealand. This species has been observed in both the North and South Islands as well as the Chatham Islands.

== Habitat and hosts ==
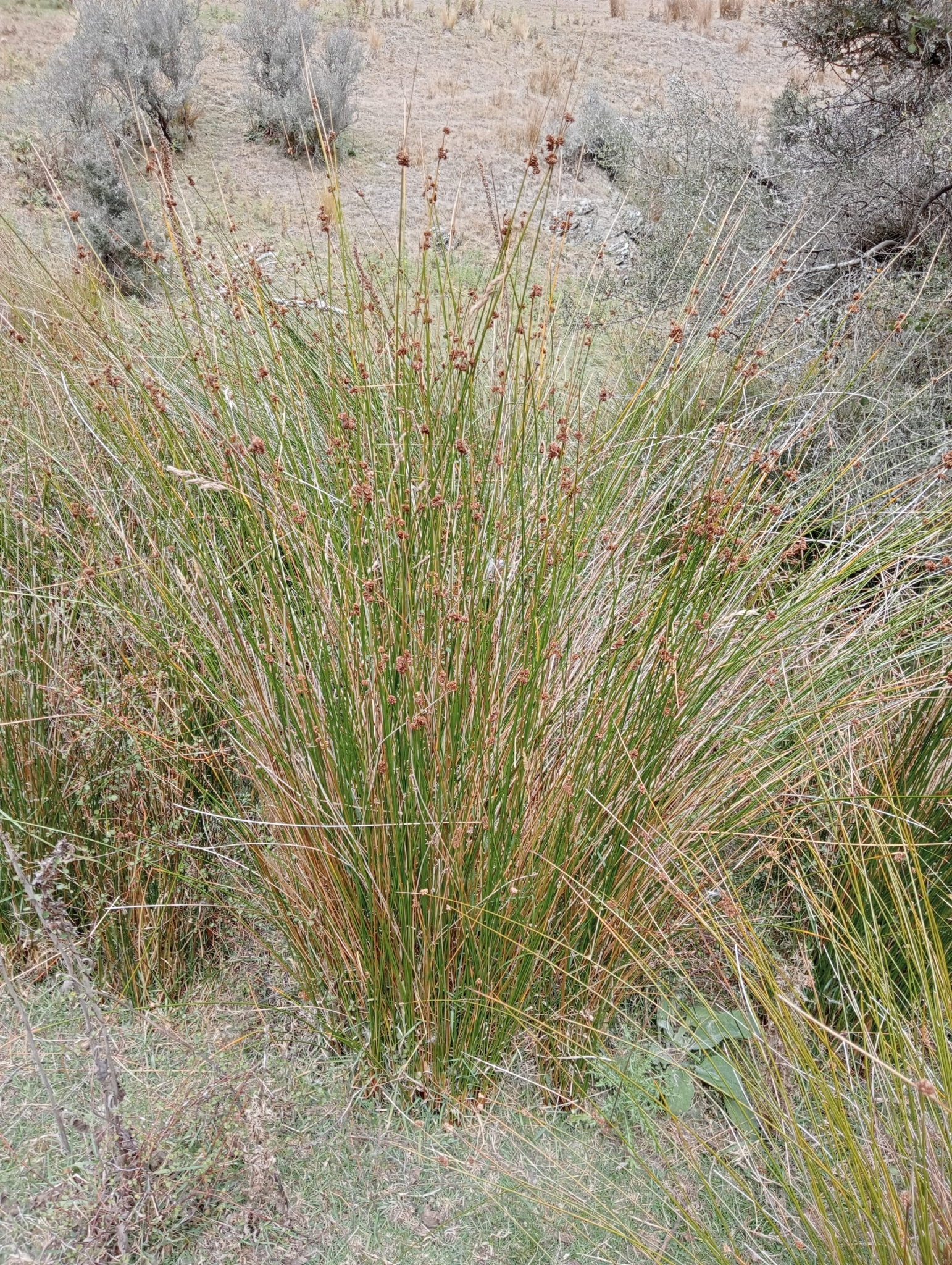
Juncus edgariae

This species is known to inhabit wetlands with rushes present. The larval host plant are species within the genus Juncus.

== Behaviour ==
Adults have been recorded on wing most commonly between October and May. Adults are attracted to light and have been collected via a mercury vapour light trap.
