= Castle Hill Peak =

Mountain in New Zealand

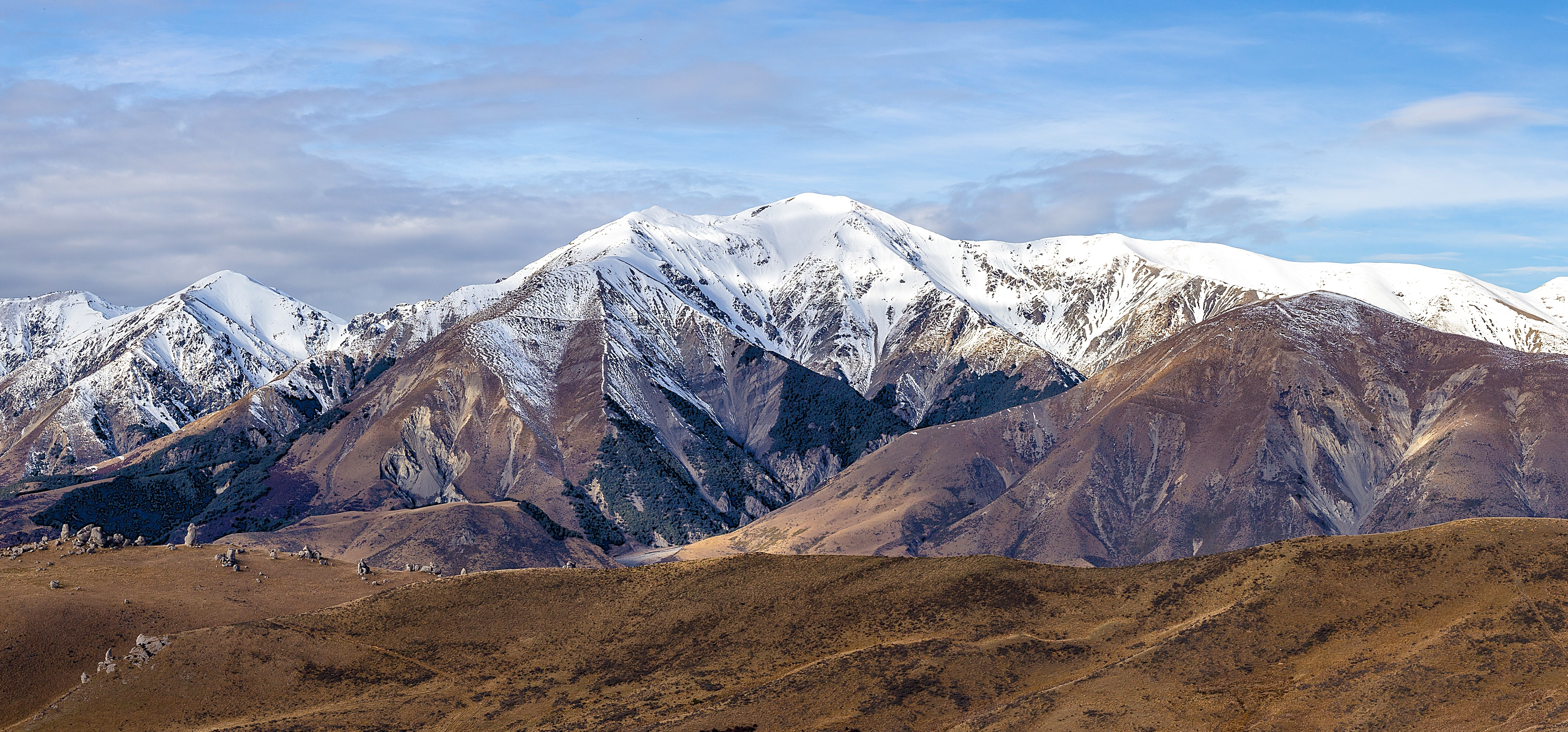
- Northwest aspect

Highest point
- Elevation: 1,998 m (6,555 ft)
- Prominence: 1,148 m (3,766 ft)
- Isolation: 4.95 km (3.08 mi)
- Coordinates: 43°15′28″S 171°46′11″E

Geography
- Location within New Zealand
- Interactive map of Castle Hill Peak
- Location: South Island
- Country: New Zealand
- Region: Canterbury
- Protected area: Korowai / Torlesse Tussocklands Park
- Parent range: Southern Alps; Torlesse Range
- Topo map: NZMS260 L34

Castle Hill Peak is a 1,998-metre-elevation (6,555-foot) mountain in the Canterbury Region of New Zealand.

== Description ==
Castle Hill Peak is the highest summit of the Torlesse Range which is a subrange of the Southern Alps. It is situated 70 kilometres (43 mi) west-northwest of the city of Christchurch and set on the boundary of Korowai / Torlesse Tussocklands Park. It is the second-highest peak in the Selwyn District of the Canterbury Region of South Island. Precipitation runoff from the mountain drains west to the Porter River, north to the Broken River and east into the Kowai River, all of which are part of the Waimakariri River drainage basin. Topographic relief is significant as the summit rises 1,300 metres (4,265 feet) above Ghost Creek in two kilometres. Climbing to the summit is a popular destination that can be accomplished by starting at Porters Pass and following an unmarked, well-worn trail towards Foggy Peak, then following the long, high, connecting ridge to Castle Hill Peak, 12 km (round-trip) from the pass. The nearest higher peak is Mount Enys, six km west in the Craigieburn Range.

== Climate ==
Based on the Köppen climate classification, Castle Hill Peak is located in a marine west coast (Cfb) climate zone. Prevailing westerly winds blow moist air from the Tasman Sea onto the mountains, where the air is forced upward by the mountains (orographic lift), causing moisture to drop in the form of rain or snow. The months of December through February offer the most favourable weather for viewing or climbing this peak. Climate data for Castle Hill Village which is six kilometres northwest of Castle Hill Peak:

Climate data for Castle Hill Village (averages 2006–2020, records 2006–present), 726m
Month	Jan	Feb	Mar	Apr	May	Jun	Jul	Aug	Sep	Oct	Nov	Dec	Year
Record high °C (°F)	33.6 (92.5)	32.8 (91.0)	30.1 (86.2)	23.7 (74.7)	20.7 (69.3)	16.8 (62.2)	15.6 (60.1)	19.3 (66.7)	21.5 (70.7)	26.5 (79.7)	29.7 (85.5)	29.9 (85.8)	33.6 (92.5)
Mean maximum °C (°F)	29.6 (85.3)	29.2 (84.6)	26.0 (78.8)	21.8 (71.2)	17.7 (63.9)	14.6 (58.3)	13.3 (55.9)	15.3 (59.5)	19.3 (66.7)	22.6 (72.7)	25.8 (78.4)	27.6 (81.7)	31.1 (88.0)
Mean daily maximum °C (°F)	22.2 (72.0)	22.0 (71.6)	19.4 (66.9)	15.1 (59.2)	11.6 (52.9)	8.1 (46.6)	7.8 (46.0)	9.9 (49.8)	12.8 (55.0)	15.1 (59.2)	17.8 (64.0)	20.0 (68.0)	15.2 (59.4)
Daily mean °C (°F)	14.7 (58.5)	14.2 (57.6)	11.9 (53.4)	8.4 (47.1)	5.5 (41.9)	2.4 (36.3)	2.1 (35.8)	3.7 (38.7)	6.1 (43.0)	8.1 (46.6)	10.6 (51.1)	12.8 (55.0)	8.4 (47.1)
Mean daily minimum °C (°F)	7.8 (46.0)	7.4 (45.3)	5.7 (42.3)	3.1 (37.6)	0.9 (33.6)	−1.8 (28.8)	−2.2 (28.0)	−1.1 (30.0)	0.4 (32.7)	1.9 (35.4)	4.1 (39.4)	6.5 (43.7)	2.7 (36.9)
Mean minimum °C (°F)	1.8 (35.2)	1.6 (34.9)	−0.7 (30.7)	−2.8 (27.0)	−5.0 (23.0)	−7.4 (18.7)	−7.8 (18.0)	−7.0 (19.4)	−5.5 (22.1)	−3.2 (26.2)	−2.0 (28.4)	0.7 (33.3)	−9.0 (15.8)
Record low °C (°F)	−1.4 (29.5)	−1.2 (29.8)	−2.9 (26.8)	−5.1 (22.8)	−6.8 (19.8)	−11.0 (12.2)	−10.6 (12.9)	−9.8 (14.4)	−6.9 (19.6)	−5.9 (21.4)	−3.9 (25.0)	−1.7 (28.9)	−11.0 (12.2)
Average rainfall mm (inches)	57.3 (2.26)	56.7 (2.23)	41.5 (1.63)	67.3 (2.65)	75.8 (2.98)	67.5 (2.66)	77.1 (3.04)	71.8 (2.83)	71.7 (2.82)	94.8 (3.73)	75.2 (2.96)	72.4 (2.85)	829.1 (32.64)
Source: Weather Summary Reports – Castle Hill Village

== Gallery ==
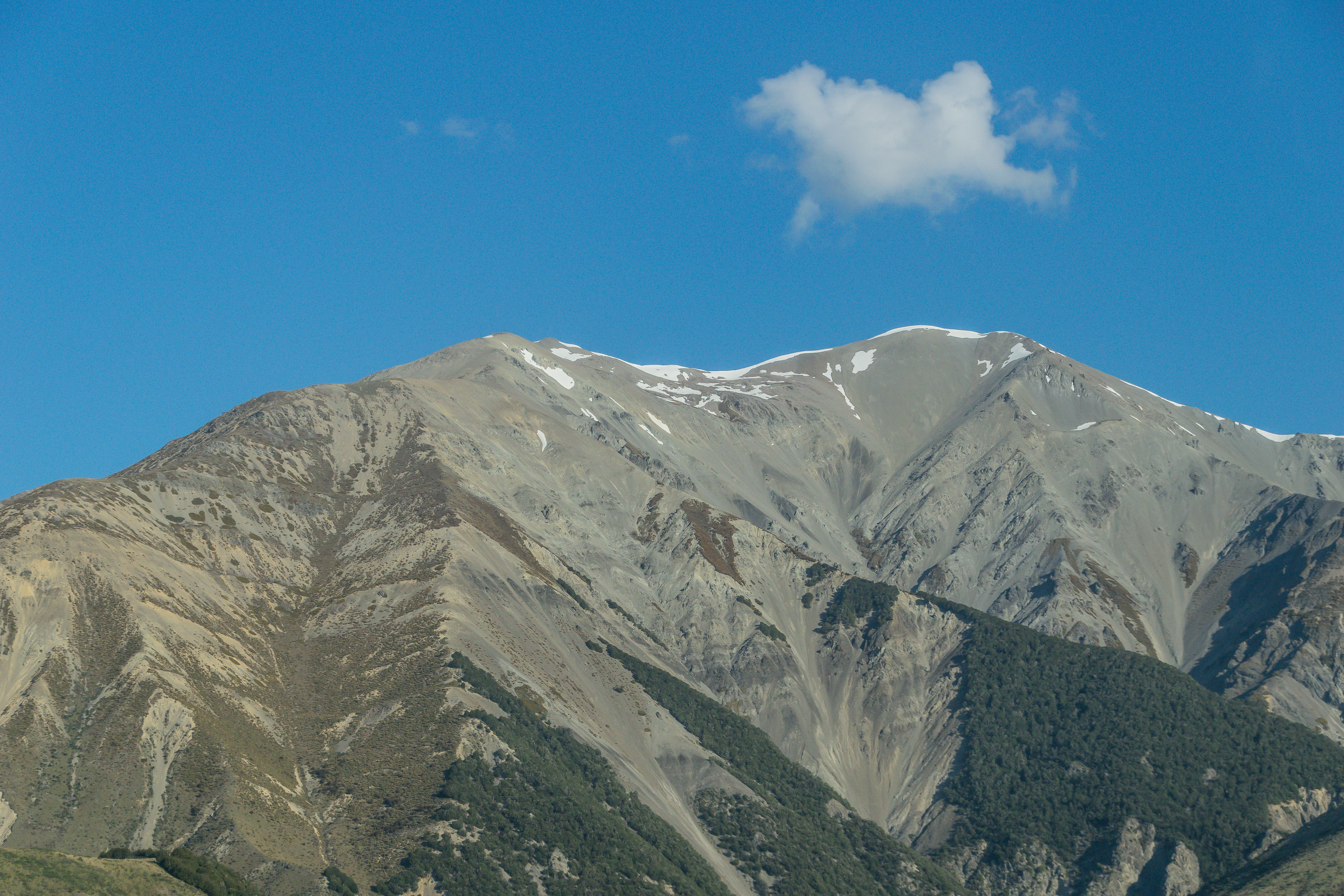
Northwest face

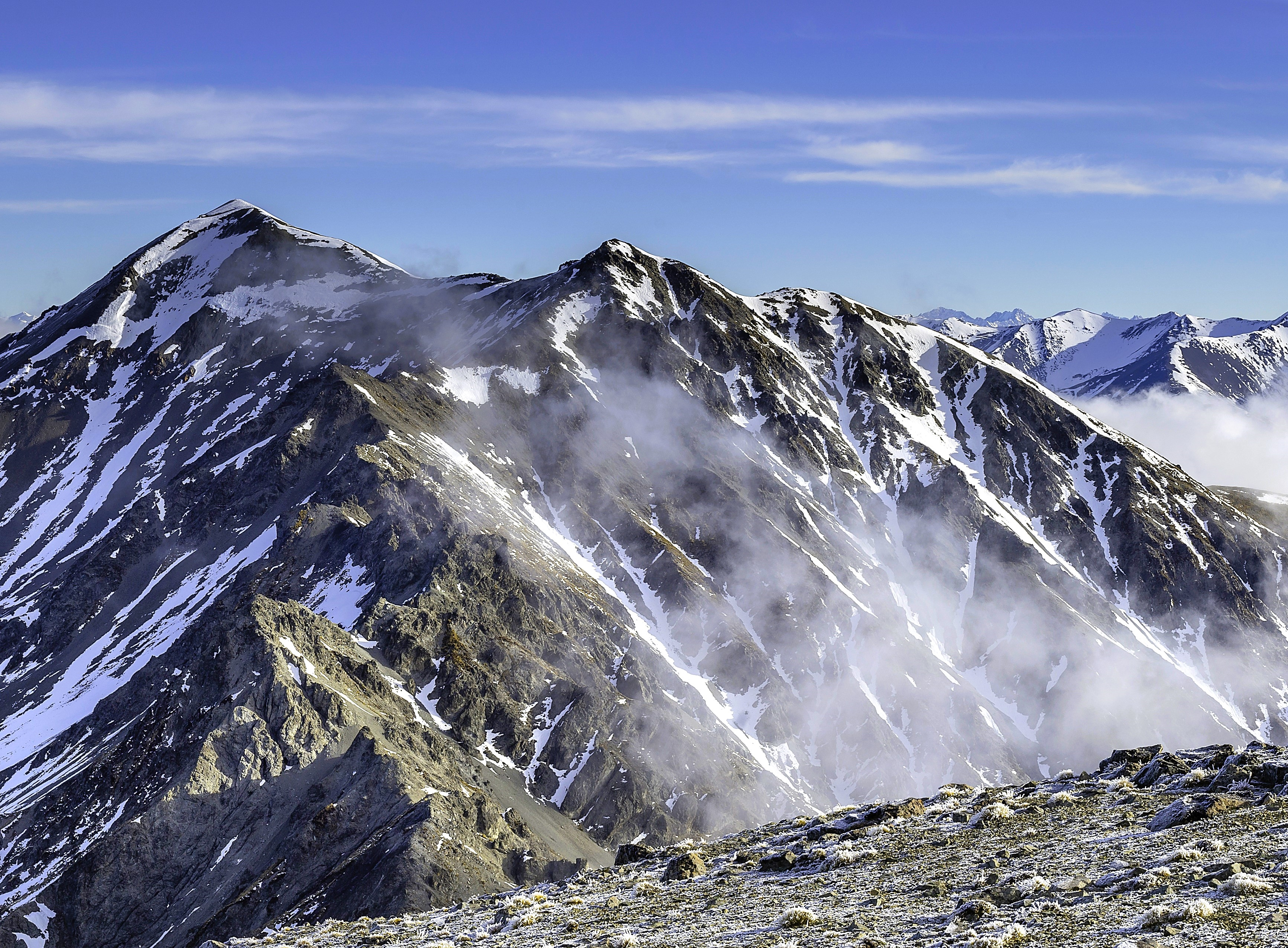
Northeast aspect, summit in upper left

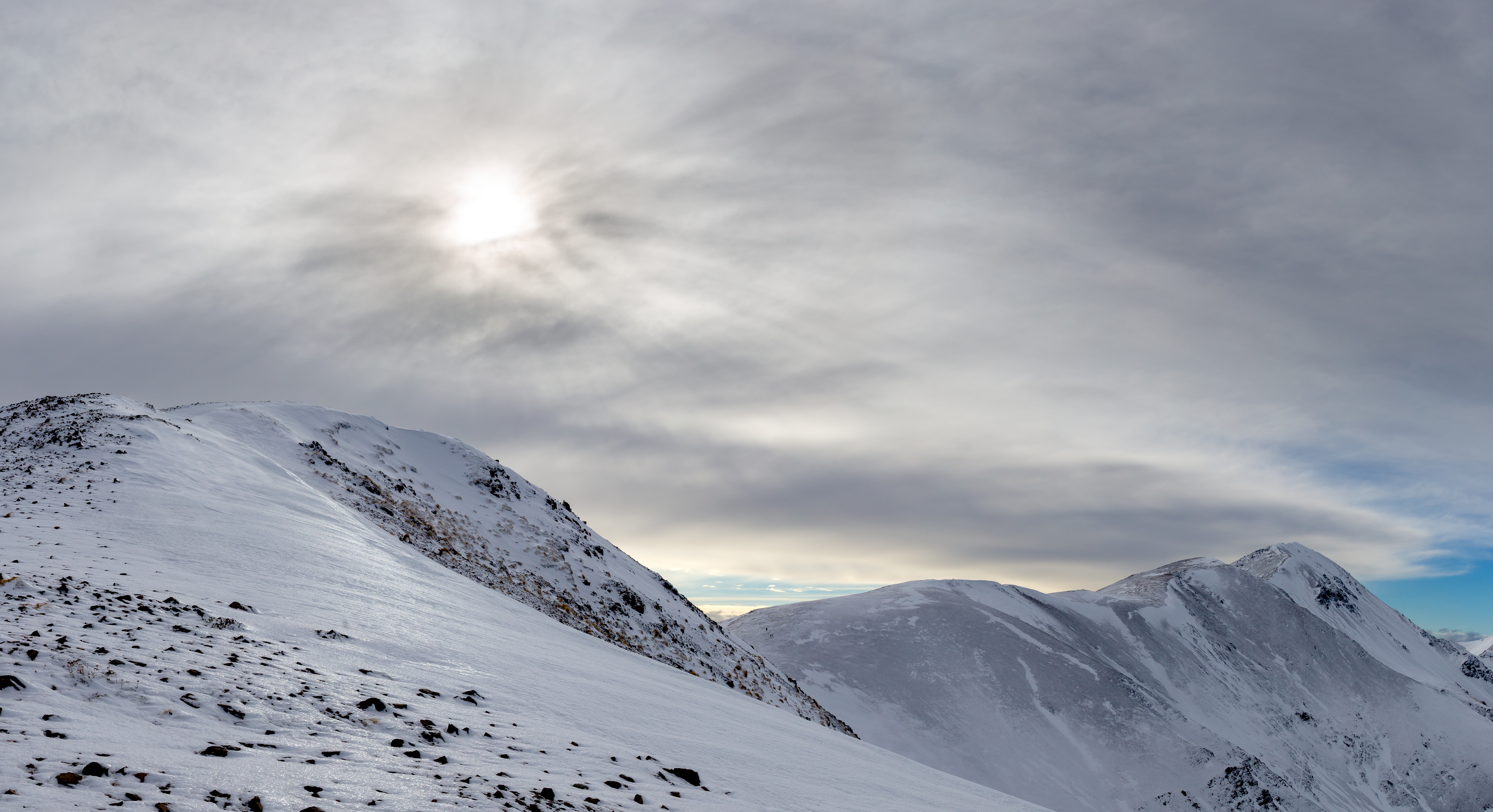
Foggy Peak (left) and Castle Hill Peak (right)

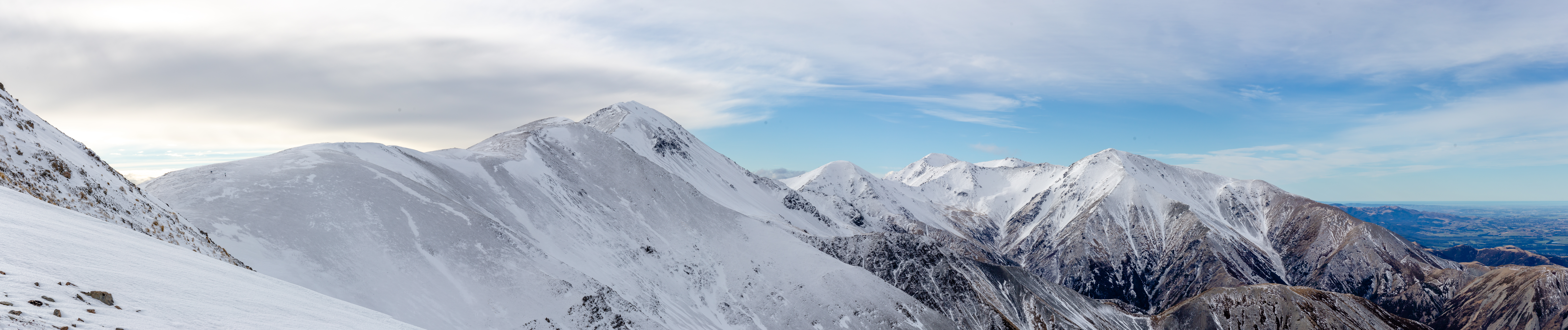
Castle Hill Peak (left of center) and Mount Torlesse (right)

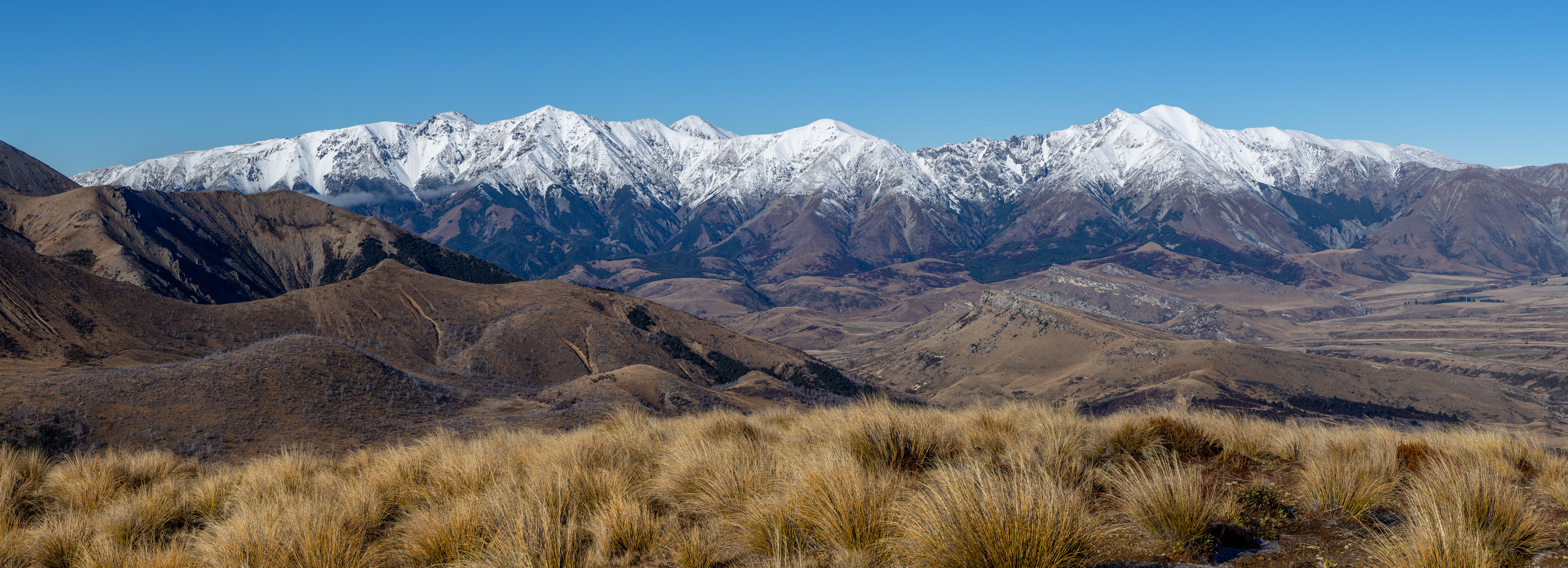
Torlesse Range, with Castle Hill Peak to right

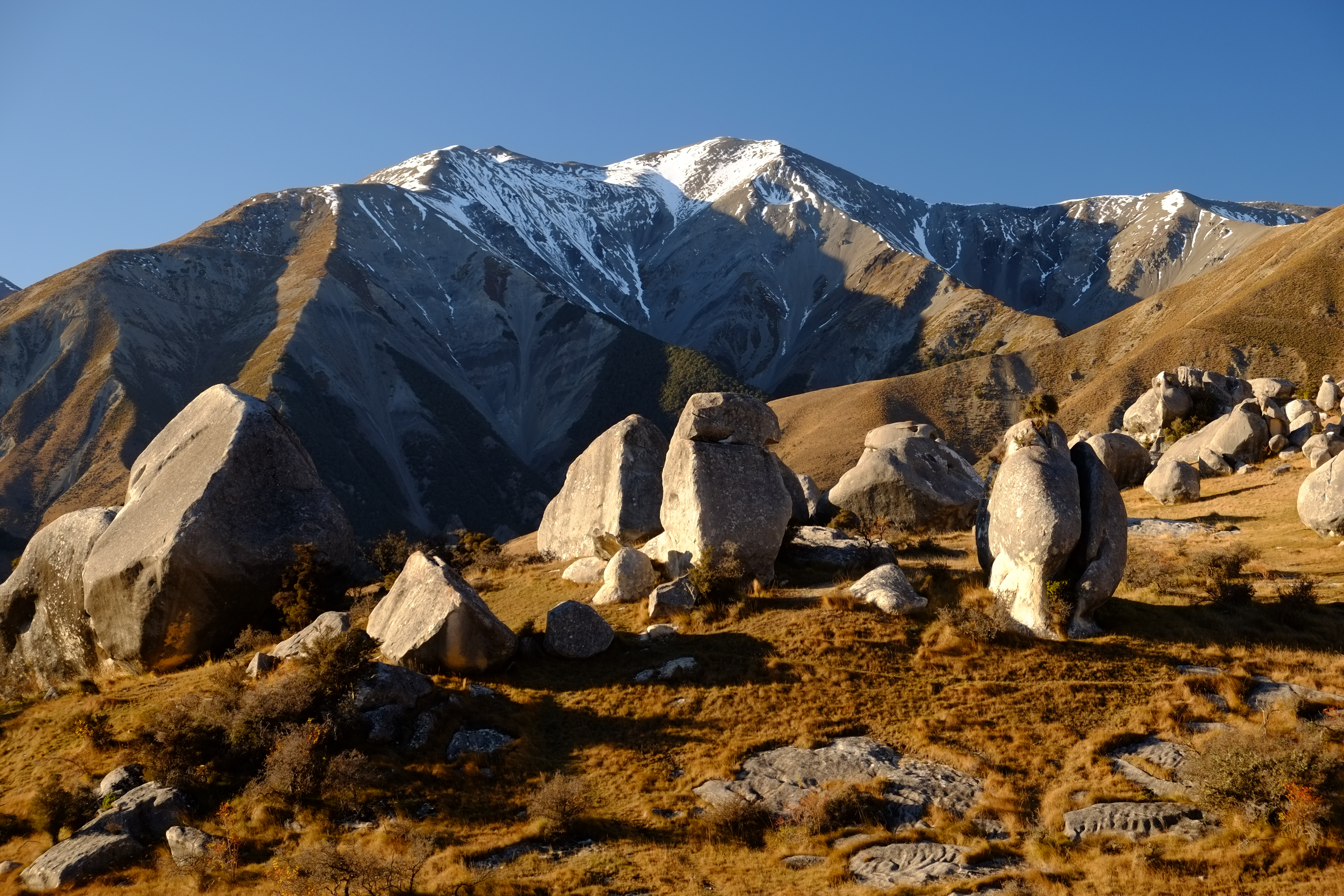
Northwest aspect

== See also ==
- Castle Hill, New Zealand
- List of mountains of New Zealand by height
