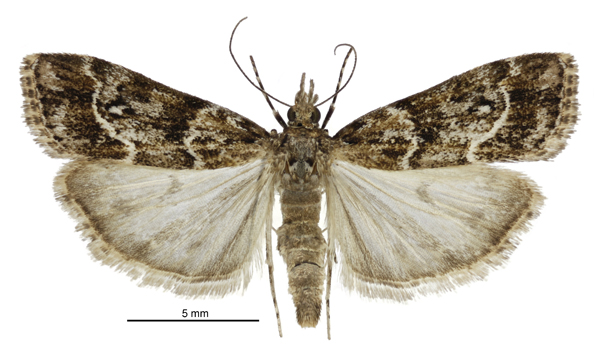
- Female
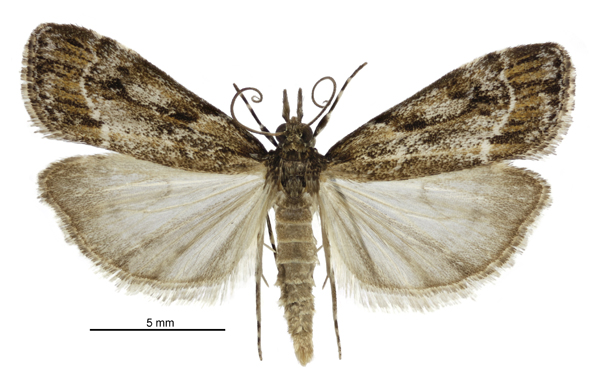
- Male

Scientific classification
- Kingdom: Animalia
- Phylum: Arthropoda
- Class: Insecta
- Order: Lepidoptera
- Family: Crambidae
- Genus: Eudonia
- Species: E. legnota

Binomial name
- Eudonia legnota (Meyrick, 1884)

Synonyms
- Xeroscopa legnota Meyrick, 1884; Scoparia legnota (Meyrick, 1884)

= Eudonia legnota =

Species of moth

Eudonia legnota is a moth in the family Crambidae. This species was named by Edward Meyrick in 1884. It is endemic to New Zealand.

The wingspan is 18–23 mm. The forewings are pale brownish-ochreous, irrorated with dark fuscous or blackish on the veins. The first line is white, suffused with whitish anteriorly and margined with dark posteriorly. The second line is white and there is a hindmarginal row of black dots. The hindwings are ochreous-grey-whitish. Adults have been recorded on wing in December and January.
