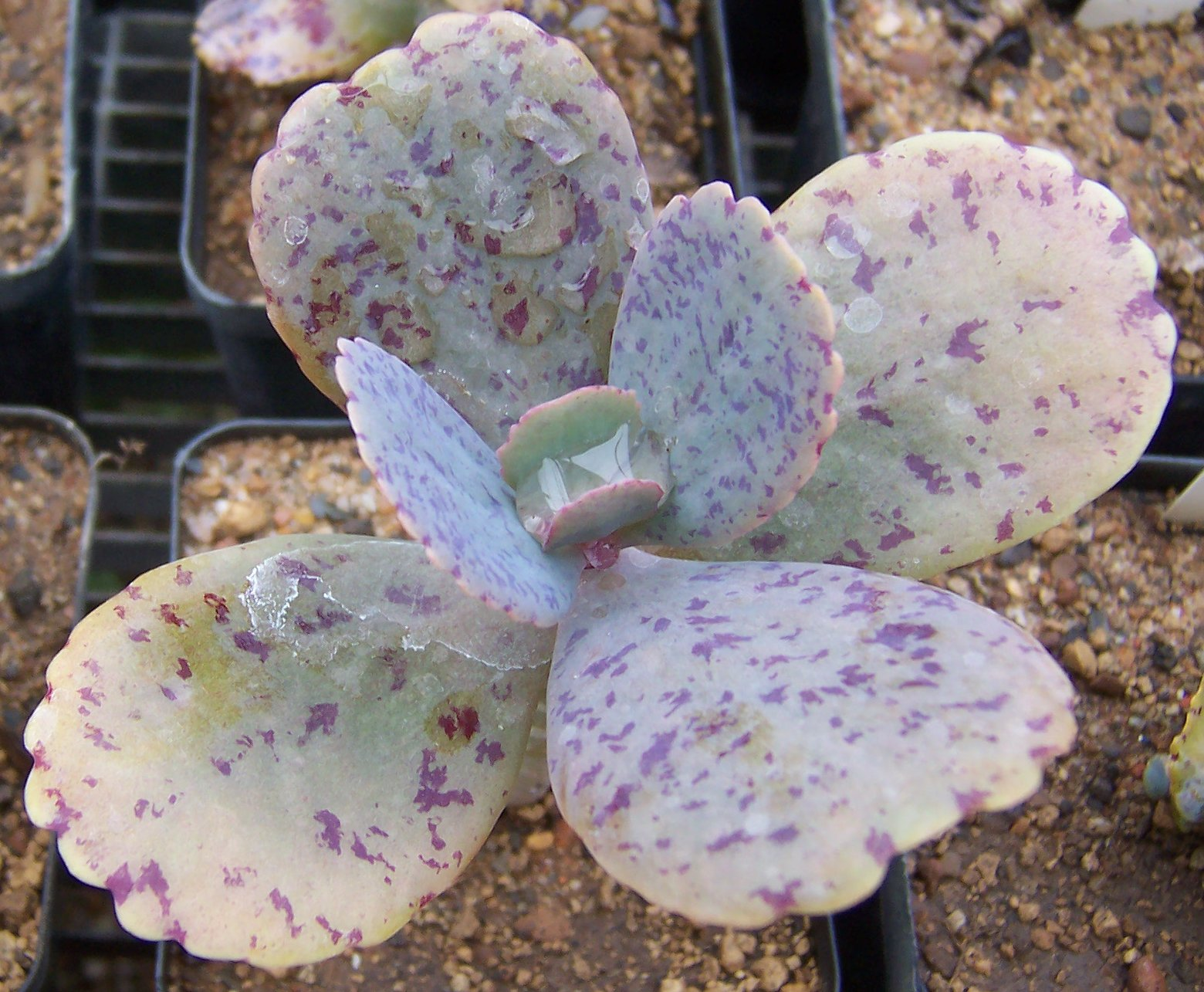
- Young plant

Scientific classification
- Kingdom: Plantae
- Clade: Embryophytes
- Clade: Tracheophytes
- Clade: Angiosperms
- Clade: Eudicots
- Order: Saxifragales
- Family: Crassulaceae
- Genus: Kalanchoe
- Species: K. marmorata

Binomial name
- Kalanchoe marmorata Baker

Synonyms
- Kalanchoe kelleriana Schinz; Kalanchoe somaliensis Baker; Kalanchoe stuhlmannii Engl.

= Kalanchoe marmorata =

Species of plant

Kalanchoe marmorata, commonly known as the penwiper or spotted kalanchoe, is a species of flowering plant in the family Crassulaceae. It is a succulent perennial native to parts of central and East Africa, including the Democratic Republic of the Congo (formerly Zaire), Ethiopia, Sudan, Somalia, Kenya, Rwanda, and Tanzania.

The plant typically grows as an erect or decumbent shrub-like succulent to about 40 cm (16 in) in cultivation, but may reach up to 1.2 m (3.9 ft) in its natural habitat. It has fleshy, obovate to elliptic, glaucous leaves marked with irregular purple or brown blotches, giving a distinctive marbled appearance. Older plants often lose their lower leaves, leaving bare stems. The flowers are produced in upright inflorescences in late winter to spring and are star-shaped, white, and four-petalled, sometimes tinged with pale pink.

== Taxonomy and nomenclature ==
The species was first formally described in 1892 by the British botanist John Gilbert Baker. The Latin specific epithet marmorata refers to the marbled or mottled surface of the leaves.

Several synonyms have been published historically, reflecting regional variation and earlier taxonomic uncertainty within the genus Kalanchoe, a group known for morphological diversity and complex species boundaries.

== Distribution and habitat ==
Kalanchoe marmorata occurs naturally in rocky grasslands, open scrub, and stony slopes, often on hill ridges at elevations between approximately 1,250 and 2,400 m (4,100 and 7,870 ft). It is adapted to seasonally dry environments and is frequently found in areas subject to grazing pressure.

== Ecology and physiology ==
Like many members of the Crassulaceae, K. marmorata exhibits xerophytic adaptations, including thickened leaves for water storage. Anatomical and physiological studies of the genus indicate that the species is likely capable of Crassulacean acid metabolism (CAM) photosynthesis, a water-use efficient pathway common among succulents.

== Phytochemistry and uses ==
Phytochemical investigations of Kalanchoe marmorata have identified a range of phenolic compounds and flavonoids in the leaves, including quercetin derivatives. These compounds are associated with antioxidant activity and have been studied in the context of traditional medicinal use of the genus Kalanchoe in Africa.

While several species of Kalanchoe are widely used in traditional medicine, documented ethnobotanical use of K. marmorata itself appears limited compared to more extensively studied species such as Kalanchoe pinnata.

== Cultivation ==
Kalanchoe marmorata is widely cultivated as an ornamental plant for its decorative foliage and flowers. It prefers bright light or full sun, well-drained soil, and infrequent watering. The minimum temperature for cultivation is approximately 12 °C (54 °F), and in temperate regions it is commonly grown under glass or as a houseplant.

== Toxicity ==
As with many species in the genus, K. marmorata contains secondary metabolites that may be toxic if ingested. While species-specific toxicity data are limited, ingestion of kalanchoes has been associated with adverse effects in livestock and pets, and caution is advised.

== Awards ==
This plant has gained the Royal Horticultural Society's Award of Garden Merit.
