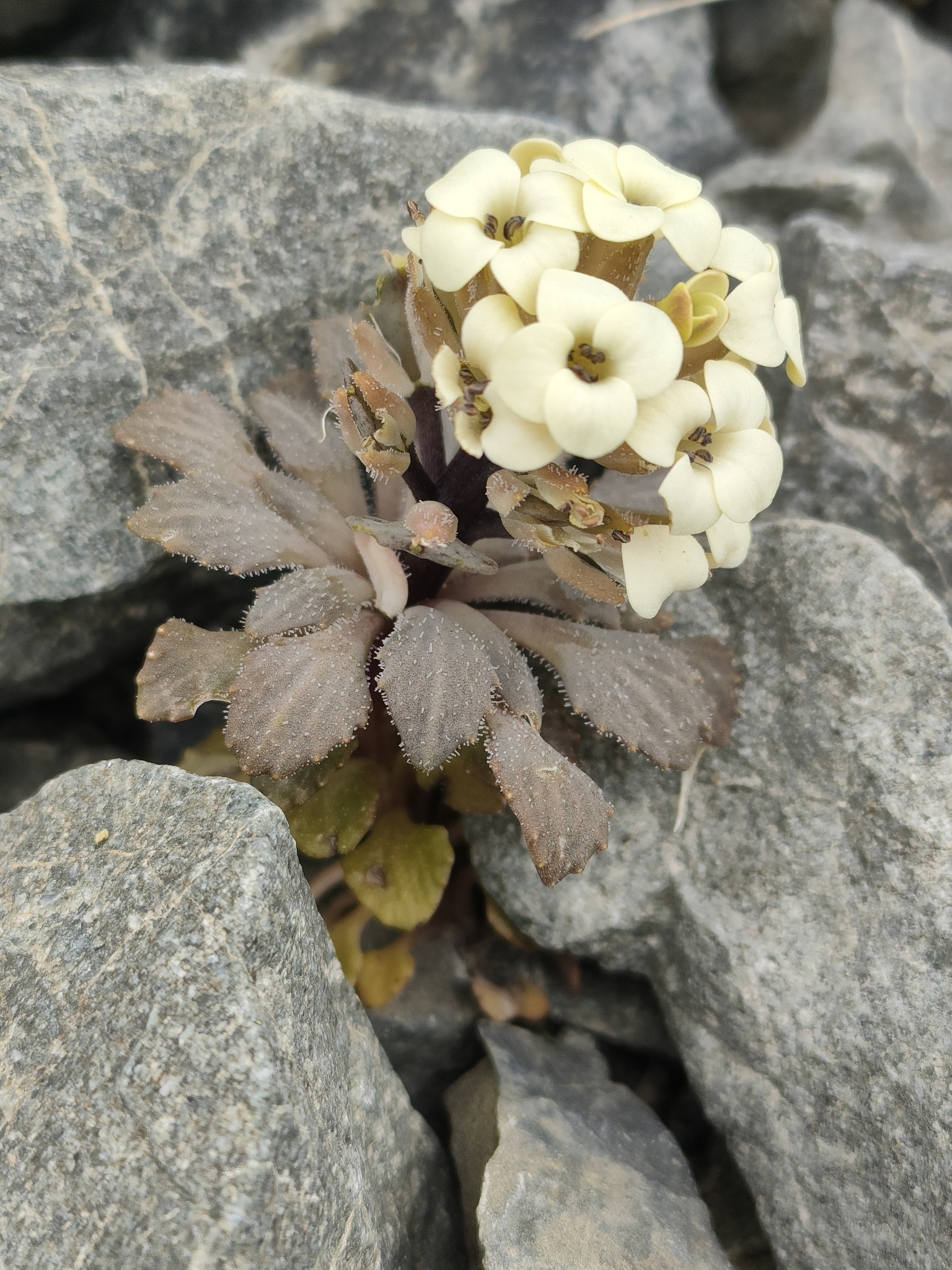
- A Notothlaspi rosulatum in bloom in Craigieburn Forest Park

Scientific classification
- Kingdom: Plantae
- Clade: Tracheophytes
- Clade: Angiosperms
- Clade: Eudicots
- Clade: Rosids
- Order: Brassicales
- Family: Brassicaceae
- Genus: Notothlaspi; Hook.f.

= Notothlaspi =

Genus of plants

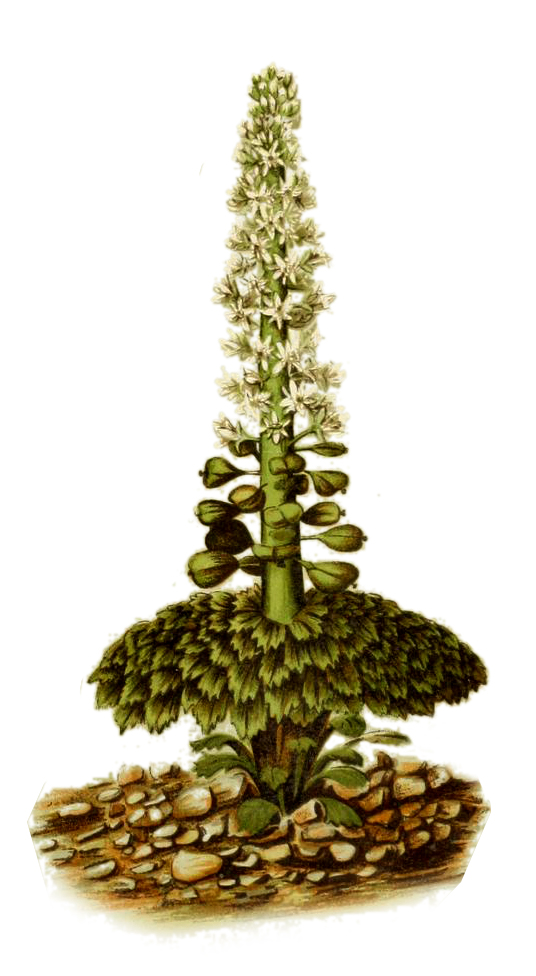
Notothlaspi rosulatum

Notothlaspi, or penwiper, is a genus of flowering plants belonging to the family Brassicaceae.

Its native range is New Zealand.

Species:

- Notothlaspi australe (Hook.f.) Hook.f.
- Notothlaspi rosulatum Hook.f.
- Notothlaspi viretum Heenan
