= Notothlaspi viretum =

- Notothlaspi viretum plant with fruits

Conservation status
- Nationally Critical (NZ TCS)

Scientific classification
- Kingdom: Plantae
- Clade: Tracheophytes
- Clade: Angiosperms
- Clade: Eudicots
- Clade: Rosids
- Order: Brassicales
- Family: Brassicaceae
- Genus: Notothlaspi
- Species: N. viretum

Binomial name
- Notothlaspi viretum Heenan

Species of plant

Notothlaspi viretum, commonly known as Red Hills penwiper, is a species of alpine herb endemic to New Zealand's South Island. It was originally described in 2019. The holotype is held at the Allan Herbarium.

The specific name viretum means 'green grass'.

== Description ==
Notothlaspi viretum is a small plant with several clustered rosettes of bright green leaves and white flowers. It is more compact than N. australe with distinct leaves.

== Behaviour ==
It flowers from December to January and fruits from February to April.

== Conservation ==
Rosette habit

Notothlaspi viretum is considered Nationally Critical under the New Zealand Threat Classification System, with a single population present in the Richmond Range. It is vulnerable to hybridisation with N. australe.

== Gallery ==
Close up of fruits

Close up of rosette leaves

In rocky habitat

Fruiting rosettes
