= Craigieburn, New Zealand =

Settlement in Canterbury, New Zealand

Craigieburn
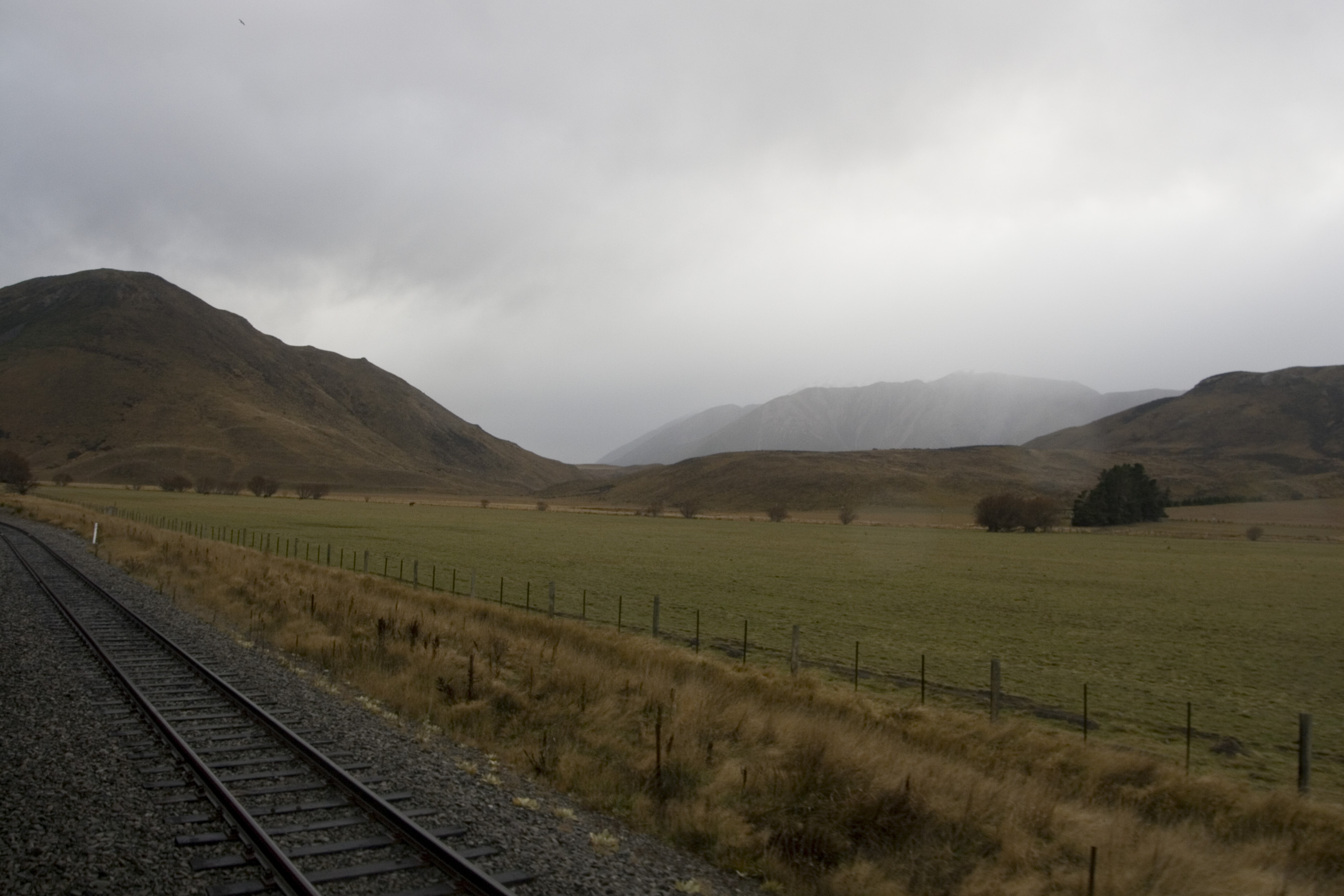
- View from TranzAlpine train near Craigieburn
- Interactive map of Craigieburn
- Coordinates: 43°06′S 171°52′E
- Country: New Zealand
- Region: Canterbury Region
- District: Selwyn District
- Ward: Malvern
- Community: Malvern
- Electorates: Selwyn; Te Tai Tonga (Māori)

Government
  - Territorial Authority: Selwyn District Council
  - Regional council: Environment Canterbury
  - Mayor of Selwyn: Lydia Gliddon
  - Selwyn MP: Nicola Grigg
  - Te Tai Tonga MP: Tākuta Ferris

Craigieburn is the name of a settlement and several geographic features in northwest Canterbury, in New Zealand's South Island.

The Craigieburn Range of mountains is located on the south banks of the Waimakariri River, south of Arthur's Pass. The Craigieburn Valley Ski Area is located on its slopes, as is the Craigieburn Forest Park. The ski slopes are within an hour and a half from Christchurch New Zealand.

The small Lake Hawdon lies immediately to the west of Craigieburn.

== Fauna ==
During the summer months five species of grasshoppers can be found along the Craigieburn Range. They include Sigaus villosus which can be found along the ridgelines, Brachaspis nivalis which lives on the rocky scree, Sigaus australis, Paprides nitidus which both live in the alpine tussocklands and Phaulacridium marginale which can be found in the tussocklands below 1100 m.

== Demographics ==
Craigieburn statistical area, which includes Arthur's Pass and Castle Hill Village, covers 3,407.52 km^{2} (1,315.65 sq mi). It had an estimated population of 210 as of June 2025, with a population density of 0.062 people per km^{2}.

Historical population
Year	Pop.	±% p.a.
2006	198	—
2013	222	+1.65%
2018	159	−6.46%
2023	210	+5.72%

Craigieburn had a population of 210 in the 2023 New Zealand census, an increase of 51 people (32.1%) since the 2018 census, and a decrease of 12 people (−5.4%) since the 2013 census. There were 120 males and 90 females in 177 dwellings. 2.9% of people identified as LGBTIQ+. The median age was 50.2 years (compared with 38.1 years nationally). There were 27 people (12.9%) aged under 15 years, 30 (14.3%) aged 15 to 29, 105 (50.0%) aged 30 to 64, and 48 (22.9%) aged 65 or older.

People could identify as more than one ethnicity. The results were 92.9% European (Pākehā); 8.6% Māori; 1.4% Pasifika; 2.9% Asian; 1.4% Middle Eastern, Latin American and African New Zealanders (MELAA); and 4.3% other, which includes people giving their ethnicity as "New Zealander". English was spoken by 100.0%, and other languages by 12.9%. New Zealand Sign Language was known by 1.4%. The percentage of people born overseas was 18.6, compared with 28.8% nationally.

Religious affiliations were 28.6% Christian, 1.4% Hindu, 1.4% Buddhist, and 1.4% New Age. People who answered that they had no religion were 61.4%, and 4.3% of people did not answer the census question.

Of those at least 15 years old, 57 (31.1%) people had a bachelor's or higher degree, 96 (52.5%) had a post-high school certificate or diploma, and 33 (18.0%) people exclusively held high school qualifications. The median income was $44,800, compared with $41,500 nationally. 15 people (8.2%) earned over $100,000 compared to 12.1% nationally. The employment status of those at least 15 was 105 (57.4%) full-time and 39 (21.3%) part-time.
