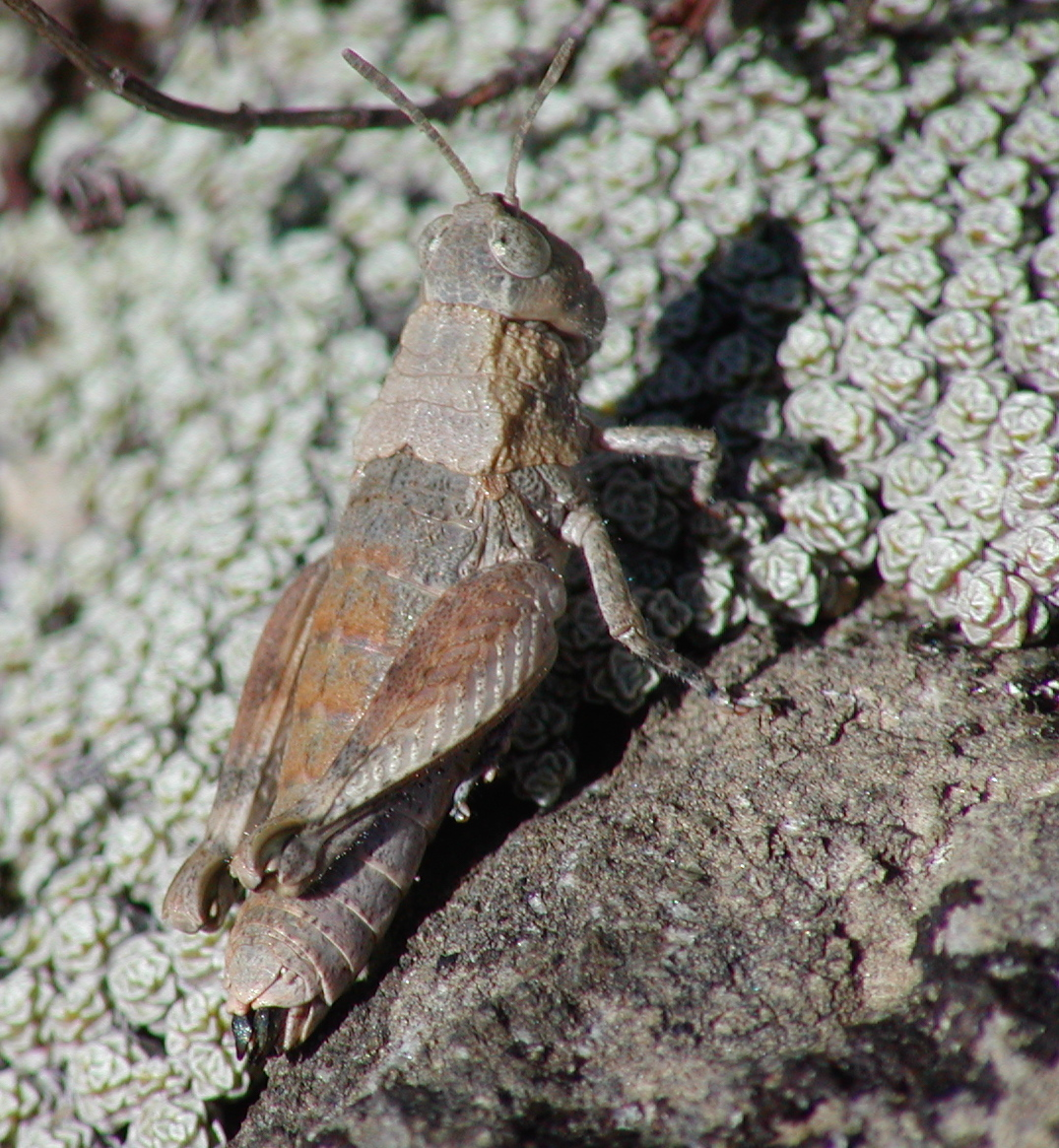
- Female
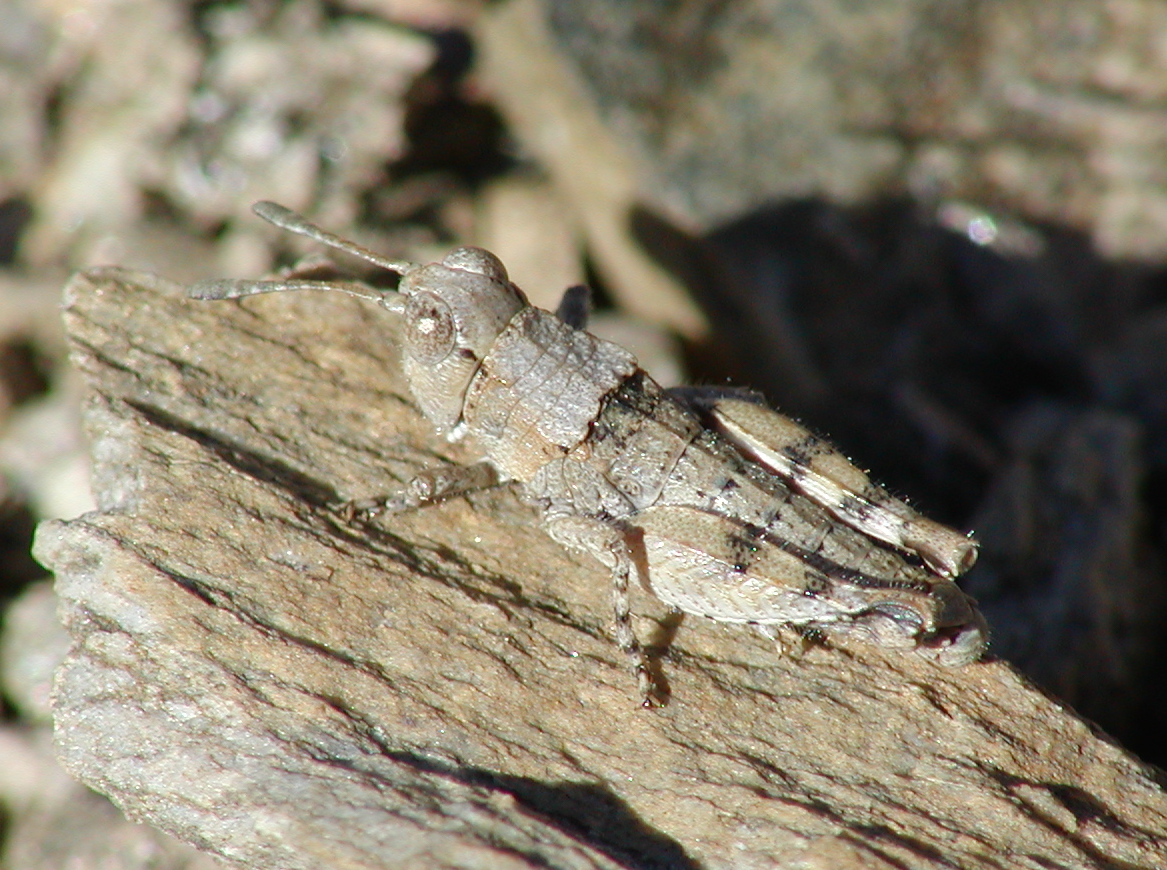
- Male

Scientific classification
- Kingdom: Animalia
- Phylum: Arthropoda
- Clade: Pancrustacea
- Class: Insecta
- Order: Orthoptera
- Suborder: Caelifera
- Family: Acrididae
- Genus: Sigaus
- Species: S. childi

Binomial name
- Sigaus childi Jamieson, 1999
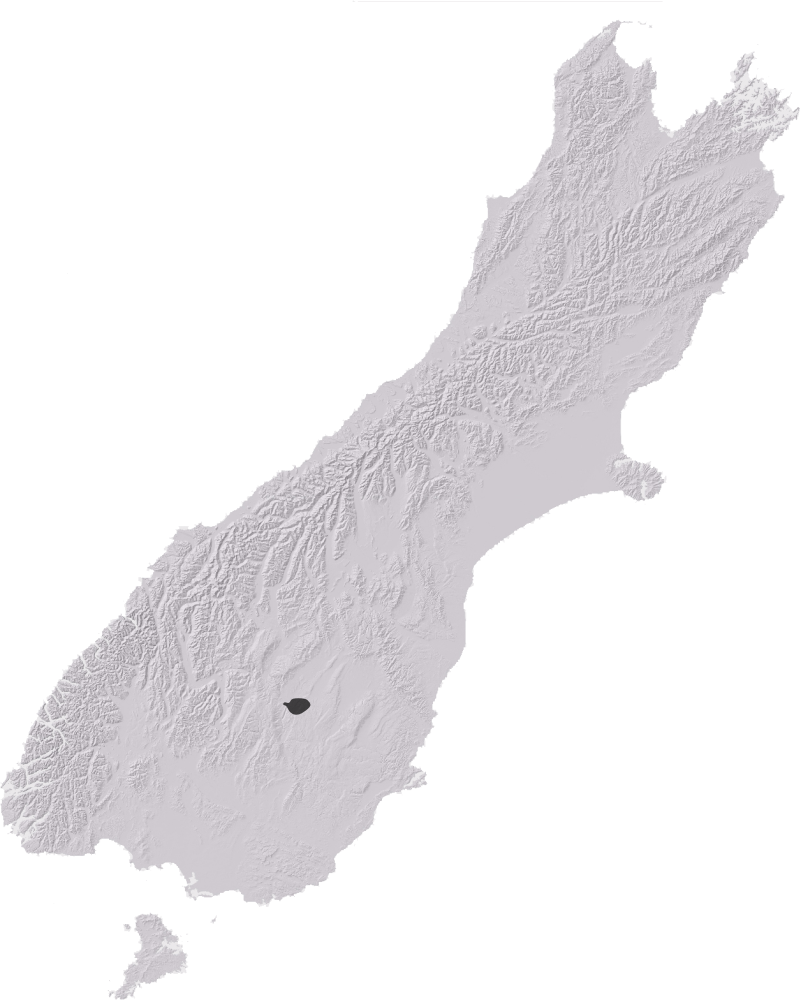
- Distribution of S. childi

= Sigaus childi =

Species of grasshopper endemic to New Zealand and classified as critically endangered

Sigaus childi is an endangered protected species of grasshopper known only from the Alexandra district of the South Island of New Zealand. It is one of just two species of grasshopper listed for protection under the New Zealand Wildlife Act 1953 (the other is Brachaspis robustus). It is currently classified as "At Risk, Naturally Uncommon" by the Department of Conservation. The genus Sigaus is endemic to New Zealand.

== Taxonomy ==
Sigaus childi was described by Colleen Jamieson in 1999, from a male specimen collected on 15 December 1997 at Galloway Station, Otago (45°12′35″S 169°29′26″E). The holotype and paratype are deposited in the Otago Museum, Dunedin. The species was named after the late Peter Child of Alexandra, who first collected it from Graveyard Gully in 1967.

== Description ==
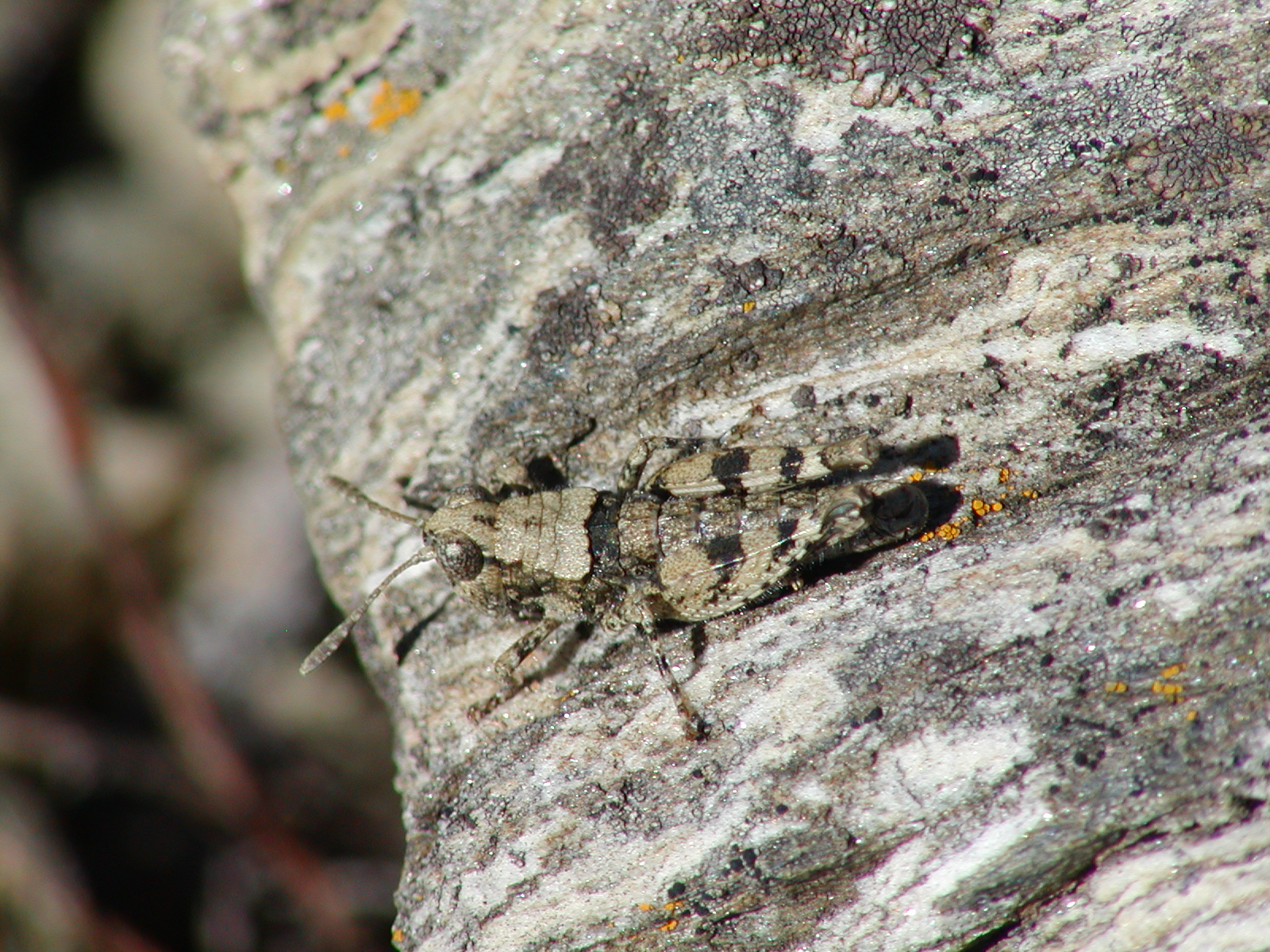
Sigaus childi displaying its cryptic coloration

Sigaus childi is morphologically cryptic and polymorphic in colour, ranging from pale grey through earthy tones to green and black. Some individuals closely match foliose lichens that grow in rocks in the area, but others more closely resemble gravels or pebbles. They rely on camouflage rather than hopping to evade predators, and their hops are short: 30–40 cm and 15 cm high. Sigaus childi was originally mistaken for Sigaus minutus, a small grasshopper species from lowland McKenzie district (South Island NZ), that it looks very similar to.

The wings on S. childi are very small – between 1–2 millimetres (0.039–0.079 in); like most New Zealand grasshoppers, this species is flightless. Males are 11–13 millimetres (0.43–0.51 in) long; females are twice as large, 21–25 millimetres (0.83–0.98 in). They have no ears, and do not sing.

== Distribution and habitat ==
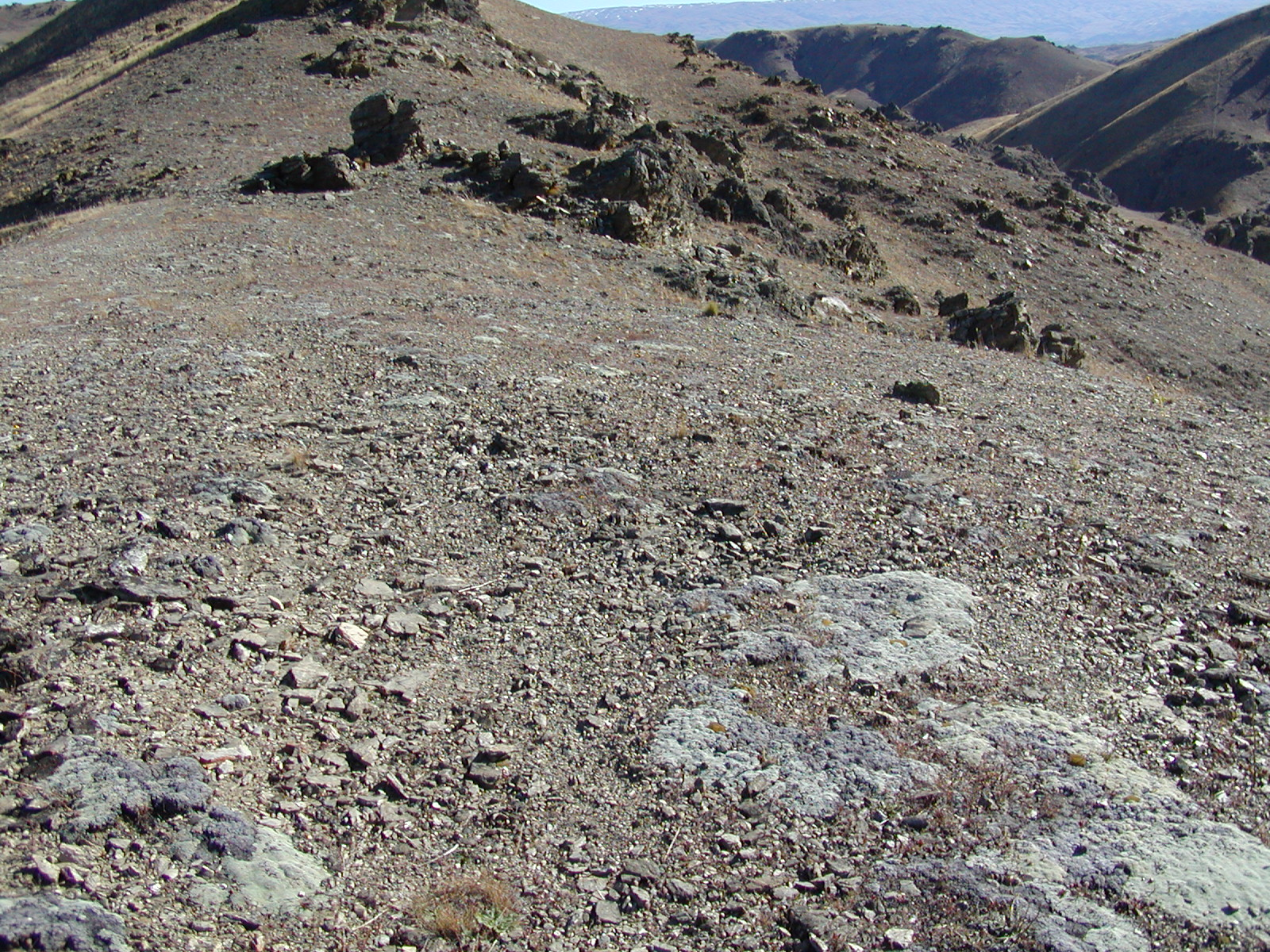
Typical S. childi habitat (Galloway Station 45°14′55″S 169°29′31″E)

This species has a patchy distribution in a small area of about 200 square kilometres around the township of Alexandra, 200–500 m above sea level. The current distribution of S. childi is likely to shrink due to climate change, and without human efforts to translocate and protect habitat the species will be extinct by 2070. Searches have been carried out on the northern end of the Knobby Range, North Rough Ridge, and the Rock and Pillar Range: all have failed to locate further populations. Sigaus childi is primarily found on dry, open, sparsely vegetated slopes, usually on north-facing hillsides, but rarely on modified farmland. Most of these sites appear rocky, mainly due to their low growing and sparse vegetation.

Another more widespread species, S. australis, that lives mostly in alpine and subalpine habitat in the mountain ranges nearby, also occurs in this lowland semi-arid habitat. This brings it into close contact and sympatry with S. childi at some locations. Genetic data indicate extensive gene flow between these two species despite maintaining morphological differences. The alpine grasshoppers of New Zealand are sister to alpine species from Tasmania, but the New Zealand clade radiated about 12 million years ago.

== Conservation ==
Threats to S. childi include introduced predators such as cats, rodents, mustelids, and hedgehogs. They are also eaten by native skinks. Rabbits compete with them for food plants (sorrel, hare's-foot clover, viper's bugloss, and Raoulia). Sigaus grasshoppers are adapted to arid open habitats, so they are threatened by landscape modification like irrigation and climate change. As at 2016 this species was classified as "At Risk, Naturally Uncommon" by the Department of Conservation.
