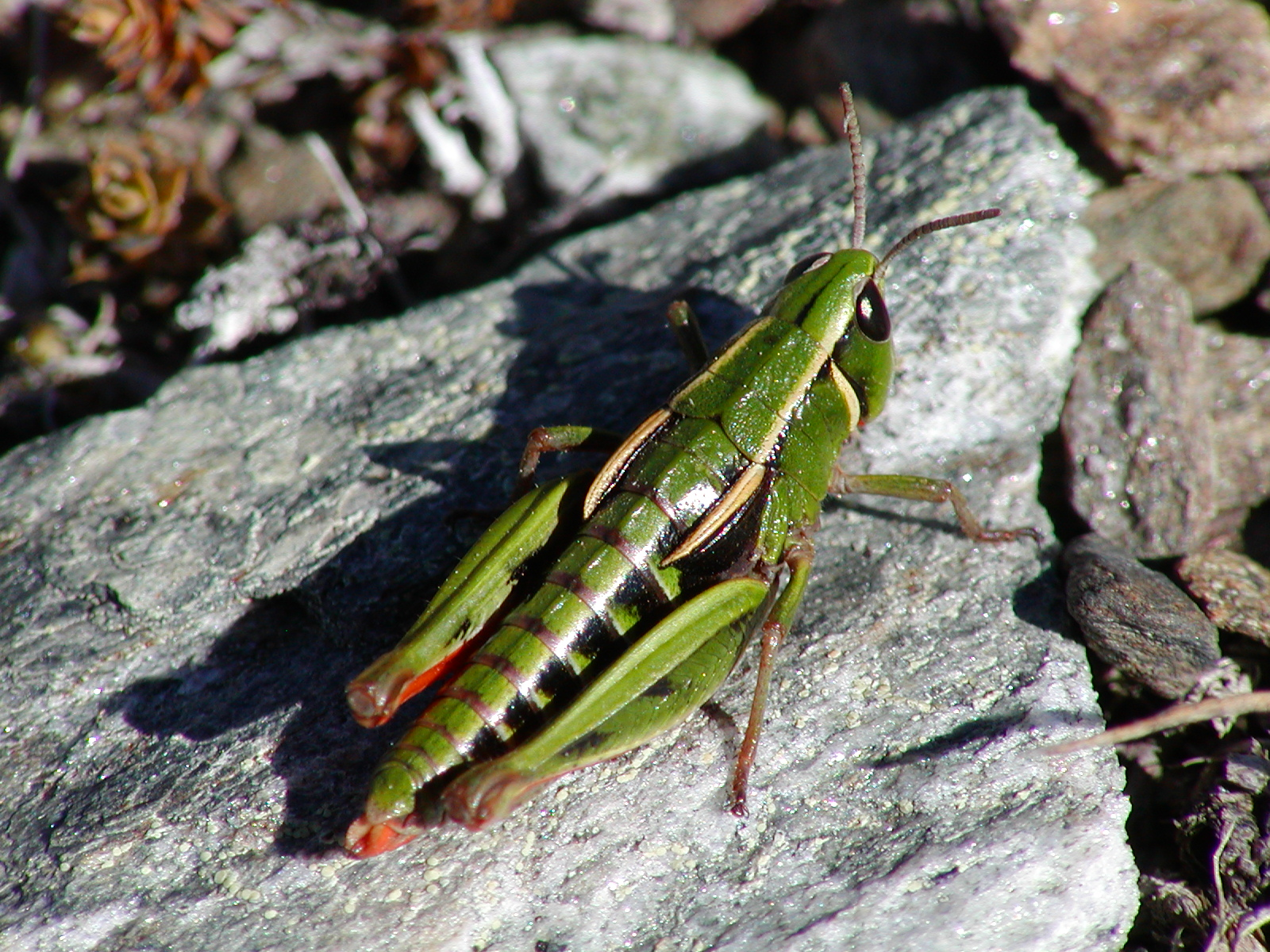
- Female

Conservation status
- Not Threatened (NZ TCS)

Scientific classification
- Kingdom: Animalia
- Phylum: Arthropoda
- Clade: Pancrustacea
- Class: Insecta
- Order: Orthoptera
- Suborder: Caelifera
- Family: Acrididae
- Genus: Sigaus
- Species: S. tumidicauda

Binomial name
- Sigaus tumidicauda (Bigelow, 1967)
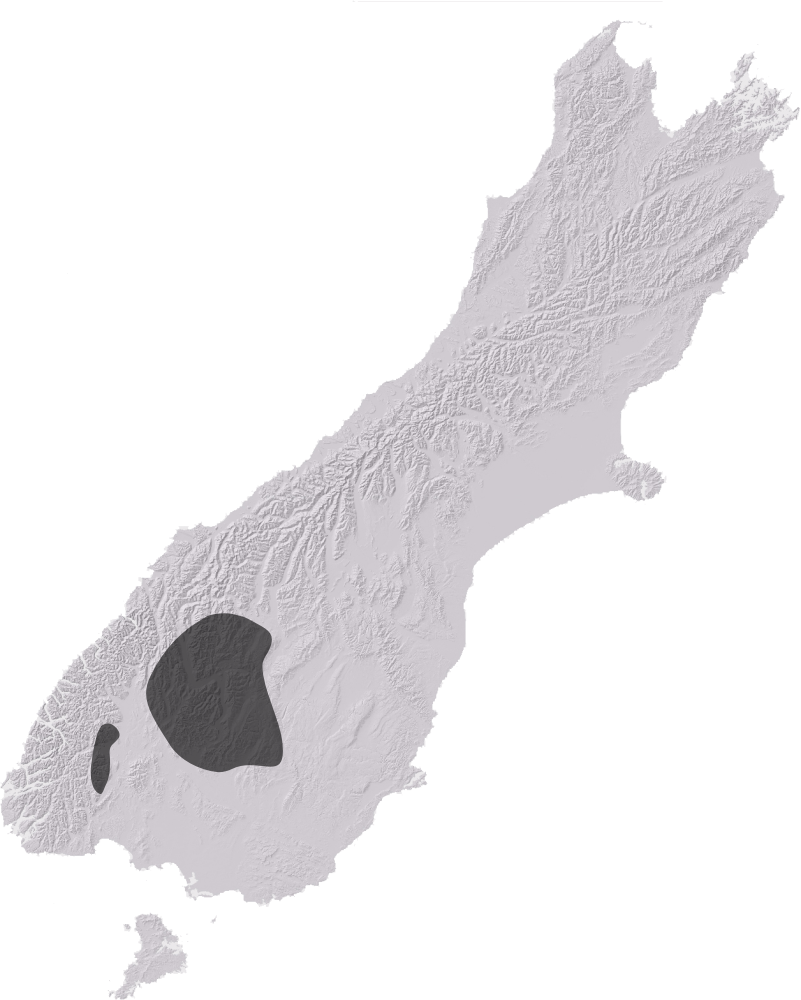
- The distribution of S. tumidicauda in New Zealand

= Sigaus tumidicauda =

Species of grasshopper

Sigaus tumidicauda is a species of alpine grasshopper, endemic to New Zealand. Like all of New Zealand sub-alpine and alpine grasshoppers, S. tumidicauda has a 2- or 3-year life cycle. The eggs must "overwinter" before they will hatch. Hoppers are found throughout the year, and adult grasshoppers can be found throughout the New Zealand summer between December and April. This grasshopper is flightless.

== Distribution and habitat ==
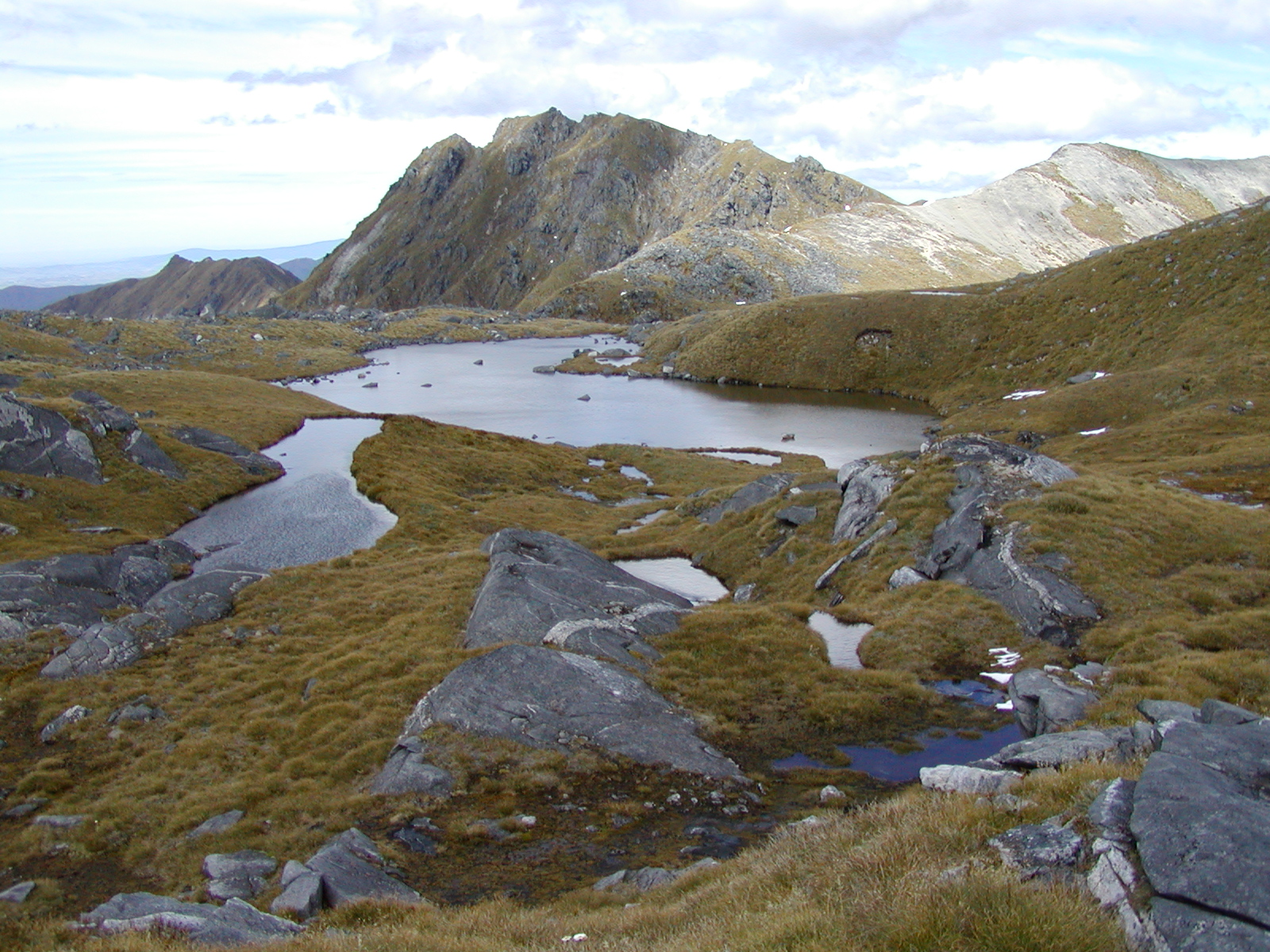
An overview S. tumidicauda habitat. Mount Burn 45°44′46″S 167°24′29″E

Sigaus tumidicauda is known only from the Otago and Southland regions of the South Island of New Zealand. It can be found as far south as Cleughearn Peak (45°49′43″S 167°24′11″E) and as far north as Mount Aurum (44°46′10″S 168°37′21″E). Sigaus tumidicauda prefers alpine tussock grasslands between 1,300 and 1,700 metres (4,300 and 5,600 ft); it can, however, be found as low as 700 metres (2,300 ft) near the Nevis River (45°08′49″S 169°00′00″E). It is one of three known species of alpine grasshoppers that are found in Fiordland, the other two being Sigaus homerensis and Sigaus takahe.

Alpinacris tumidicauda is sister to the widespread species Sigaus australis. The genus Alpinacris included Alpinacris crassicauda previously thought to be sister to A. tumidicauda. Climate change will reduce the current range of this species by 35 – 75%.

== Species description ==
Sigaus tumidicauda is micropterous (small-winged), with wings measuring between 2 and 4 millimetres (0.079 and 0.157 in), making this species flightless like most New Zealand grasshoppers. Male body length is 12–14 millimetres (0.47–0.55 in); female body length is 21–24 millimetres (0.83–0.94 in).

Sigaus tumidicauda was described in 1967 by Robert Sidney Bigelow, in the genus Alpinacris, with a type locality of Obelisk (Māori: Kopuwai) in the Old Man Range (45°19′22″S 169°12′27″E). A male holotype and paratype are deposited in the Canterbury Museum, Christchurch.

=== Type information ===
- Bigelow, R. S. (1967). The Grasshoppers of New Zealand, Their Taxonomy and Distribution. Christchurch: University of Canterbury
- Type locality: Obelisk, Old Man Range, Otago, 1,372 metres (4,501 ft)
- Type specimen: Male; 3 December 1963; R. S. Bigelow. Holotype and paratype are deposited in the Canterbury Museum, Christchurch.

=== Polymorphism ===
Four colour morphs are known for adult S. tumidicauda: green, olive, dark olive and yellow-brown. The most common colour morph is green, followed by the yellow-brown colour morph.

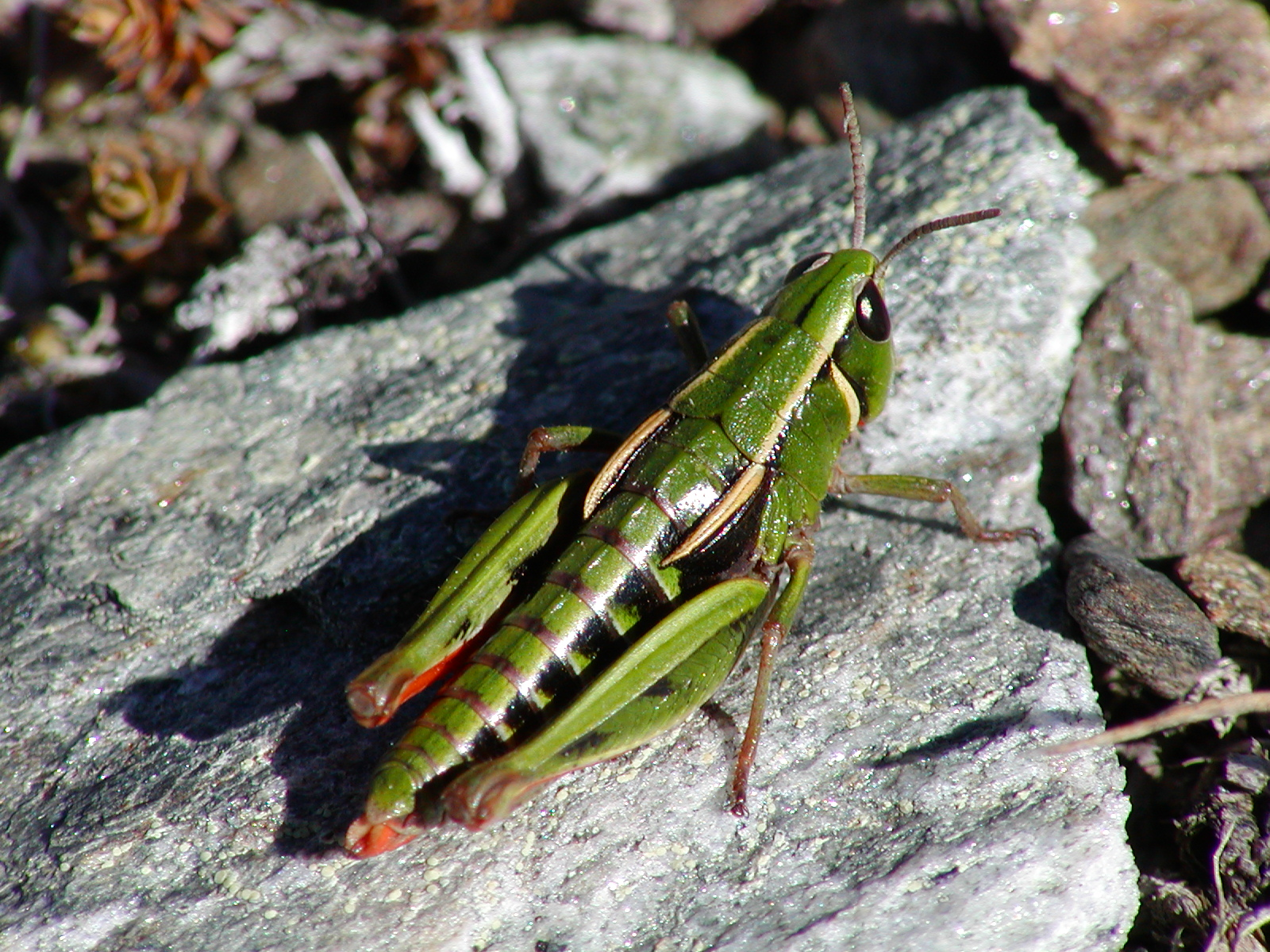
Green colour morph

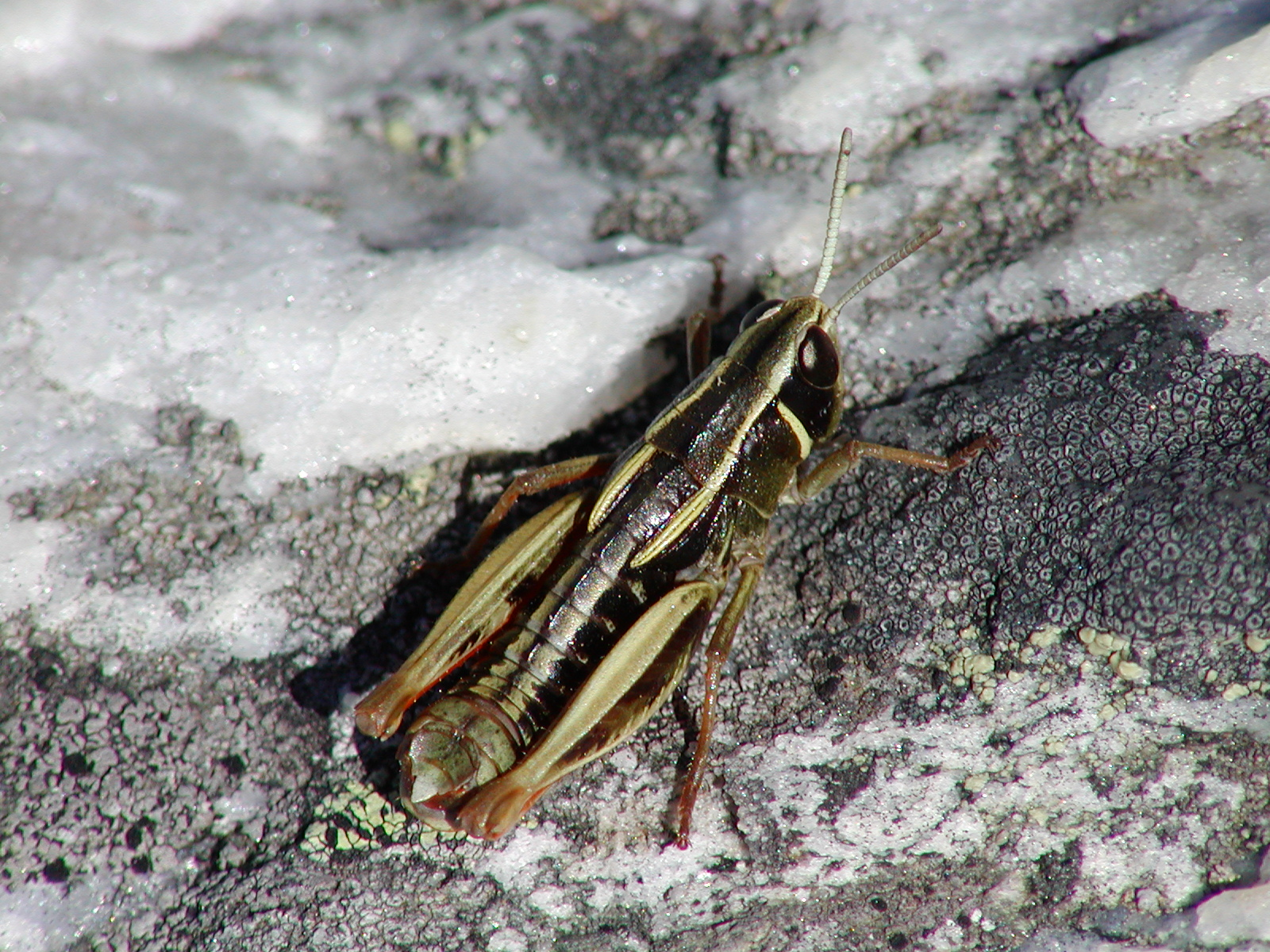
Olive colour morph

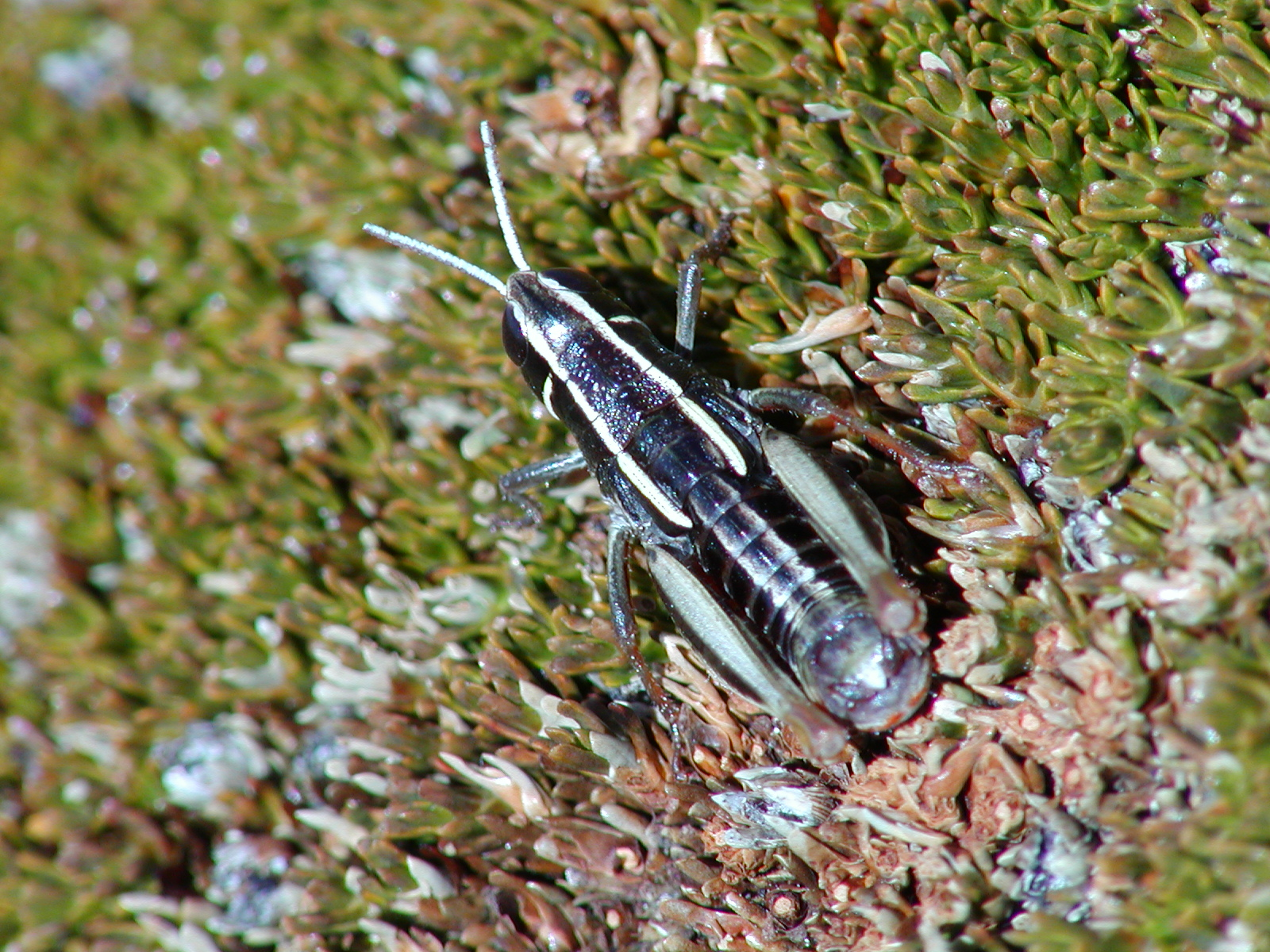
Dark olive colour morph

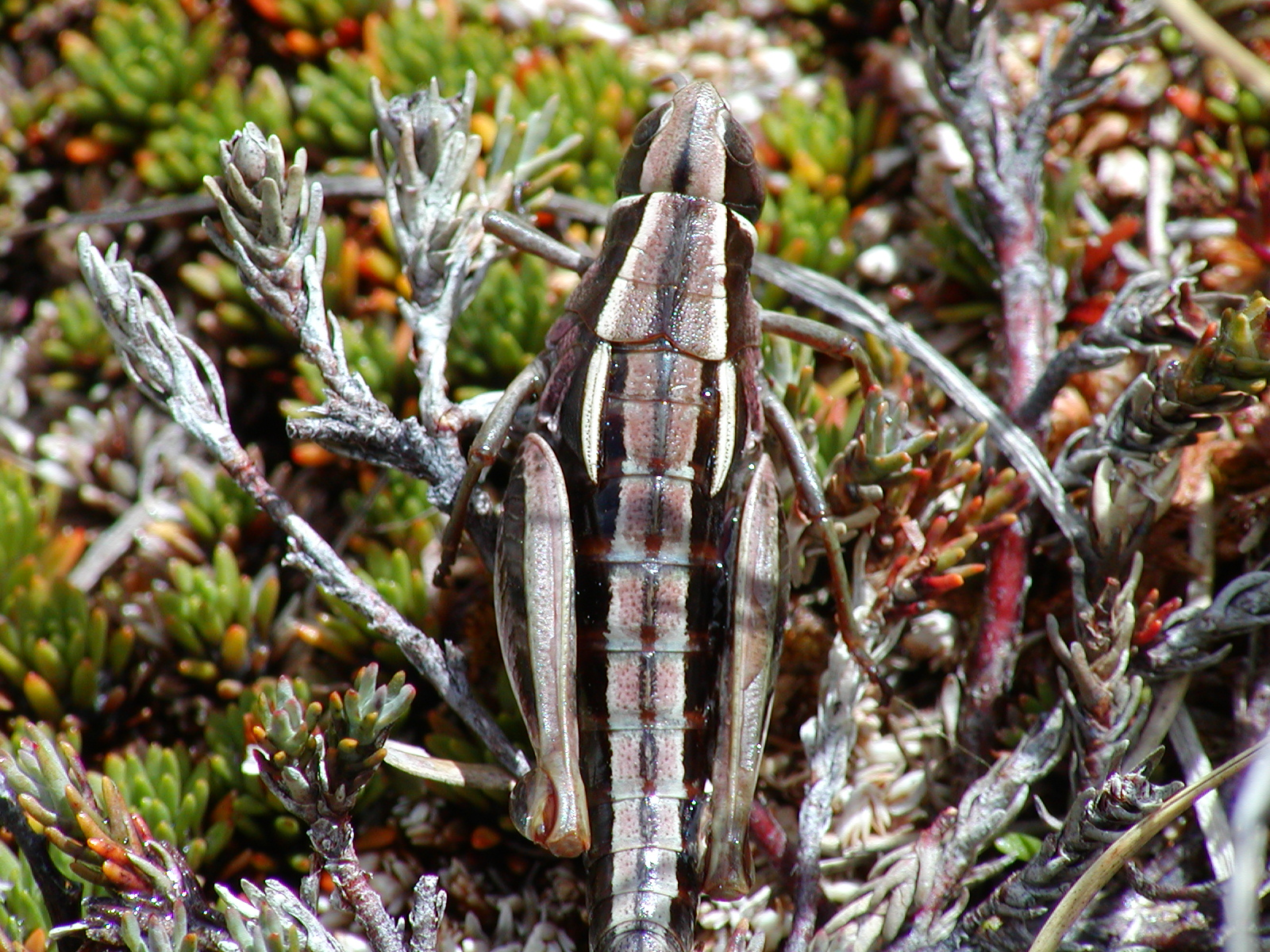
Yellow-brown colour morph

== Conservation status ==
Under the New Zealand Threat Classification System, this species is listed as "Not Threatened".
