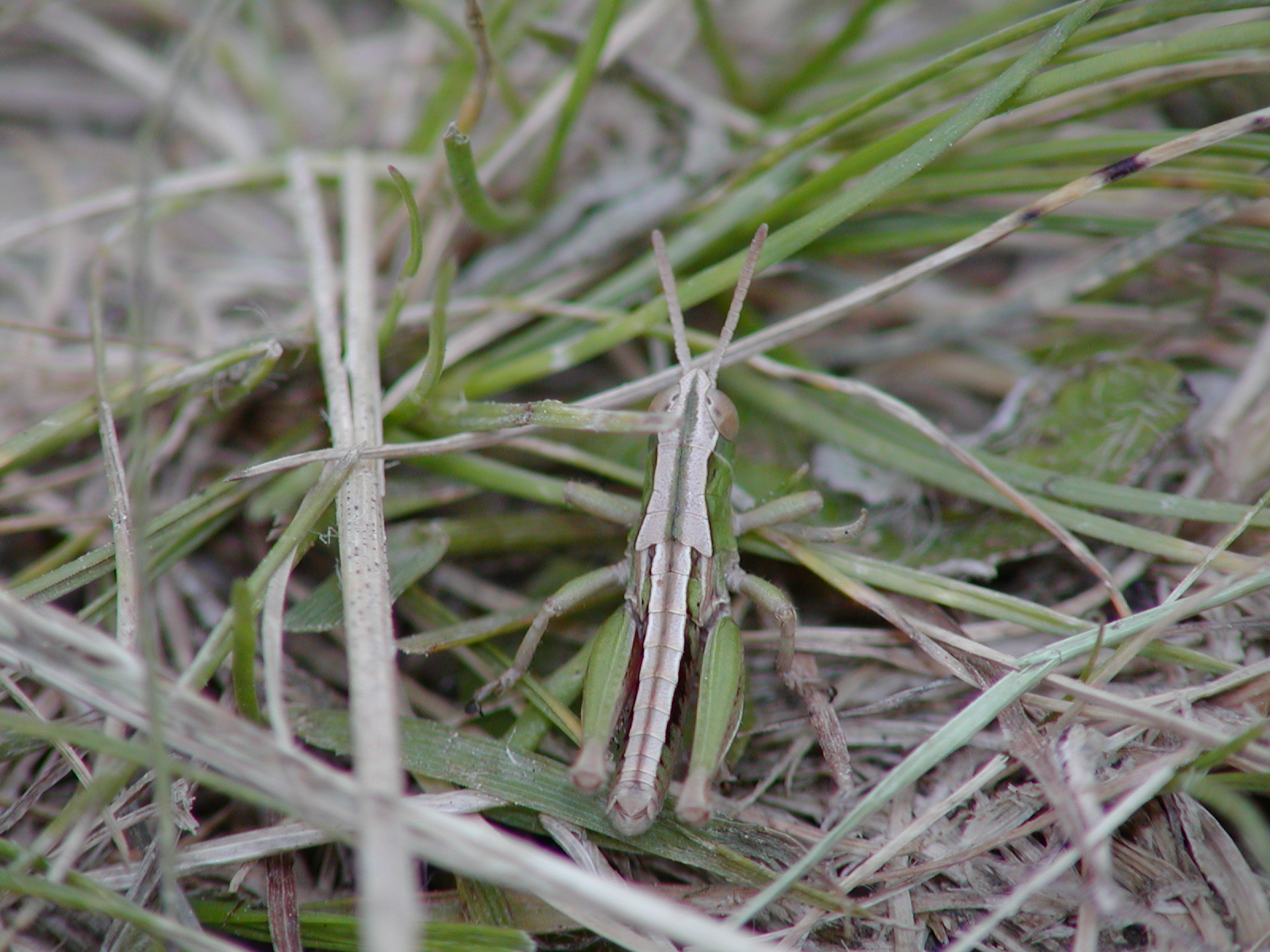
- Sigaus campestris

Scientific classification
- Kingdom: Animalia
- Phylum: Arthropoda
- Clade: Pancrustacea
- Class: Insecta
- Order: Orthoptera
- Suborder: Caelifera
- Family: Acrididae
- Subfamily: Catantopinae
- Tribe: Catantopini
- Genus: Sigaus
- Species: S. campestris

Binomial name
- Sigaus campestris Hutton, 1898

= Sigaus campestris =

Species of grasshopper

Sigaus campestris is a species of short-horned grasshopper in the family Acrididae. It is found in South Island of New Zealand. This species is fairly widespread in Canterbury and Otago, found from 400 to 1,200 m above sea level. Sigaus campestris is a flightless species and expected to lose 45 - 67% of its current range due to climate change. Sigaus campestris is sister to the endangered species Sigaus minutus.

Observations of S. campestris showing species distribution in New Zealand [from iNaturalist 2024]
