= Lake Hawdon (New Zealand) =

Lake in New Zealand

- Location within New Zealand
- Location: Canterbury, New Zealand
- Coordinates: 43°06′15″S 171°51′00″E
- Primary inflows: Lake Marymere
- Primary outflows: Slovens Stream
- Max. length: 1,000 metres (3,300 ft)
- Max. width: 450 metres (1,480 ft)
- Surface area: 30 hectares (74 acres)
- Surface elevation: 579 metres (1,900 ft)

Lake Hawdon is a small high country lake in Canterbury, New Zealand.

The lake lies approximately 130 kilometres to the northwest of Christchurch, and is one of a series of lakes which make up part of the Waimakariri River system, along with the nearby Lake Marymere, which lies immediately to the south. The waters from Marymere flow into Hawdon, which has an outflow to the Slovens Stream, a tributary of the Broken River (itself a tributary of the Waimakariri). Immediately to the west of the lake is the peak of Mount St Bernard.

Lake Hawdon lies at an altitude of 579 metres (1,900 ft). At its maximum extent, the lake is 1,000 metres (3,300 ft) in length and 450 metres (1,480 ft) wide. The total surface area is approximately 30 hectares (74 acres).

The lake is a popular fly fishing site for both brown and rainbow trout.

The small settlement of Craigieburn is immediately to the east of the lake. Access is via a walking track off Craigieburn Road.

The lake was named after Joseph Hawdon, a colonial land owner in Canterbury during the 19th century.
