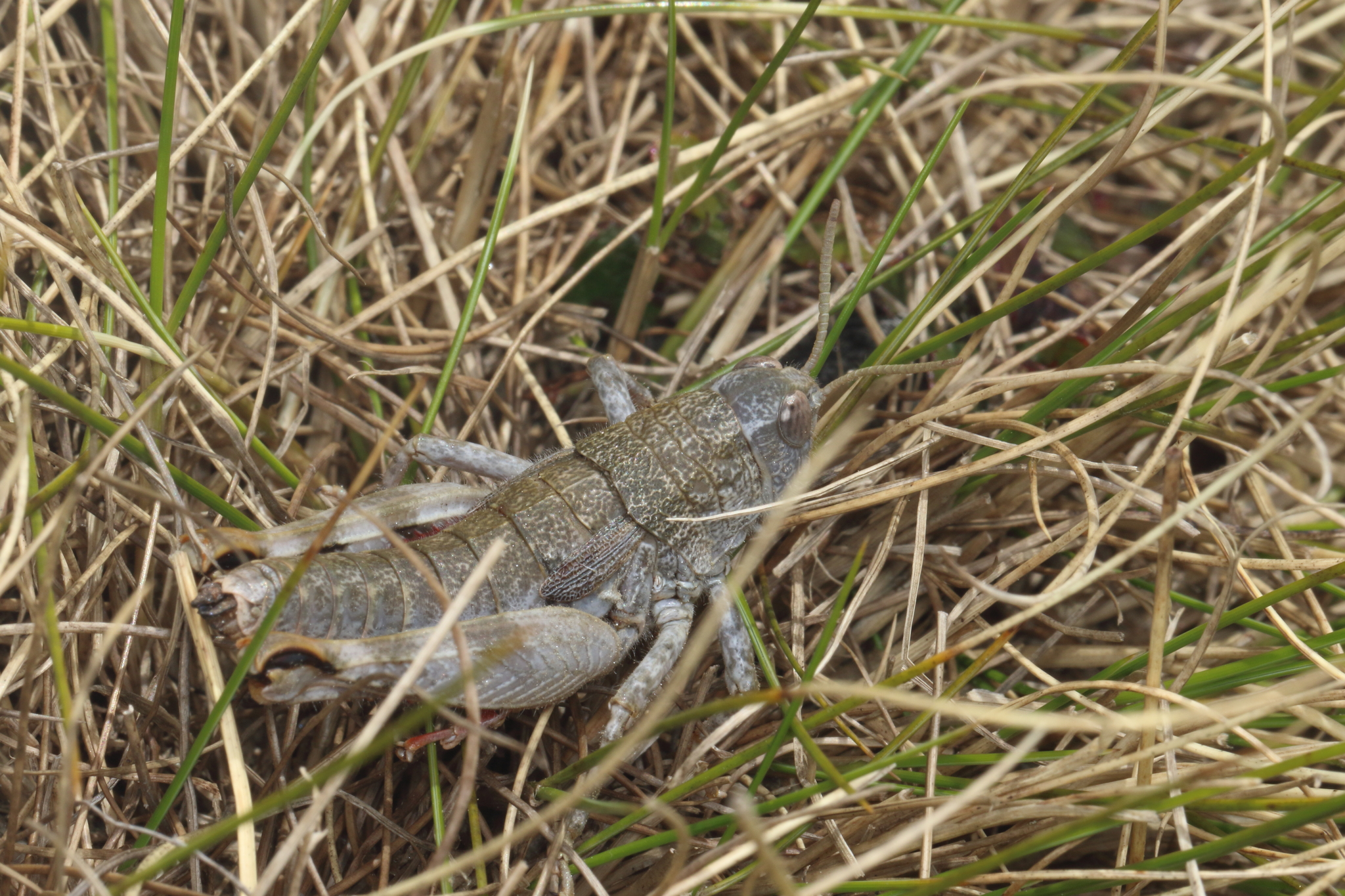
- Sigaus collinus, New Zealand

Scientific classification
- Kingdom: Animalia
- Phylum: Arthropoda
- Clade: Pancrustacea
- Class: Insecta
- Order: Orthoptera
- Suborder: Caelifera
- Family: Acrididae
- Tribe: Catantopini
- Genus: Sigaus
- Species: S. collinus

Binomial name
- Sigaus collinus (Hutton, 1898)

= Sigaus collinus =

Species of grasshopper

The Green Rock-hopper grasshopper, Sigaus collinus is an alpine species of short-horned grasshopper in the family Acrididae. It is found in New Zealand in the mountains of northern South Island, above the tree line and as high as 2000 m asl. In New Zealand alpine grasshoppers can freeze solid at any time of the year and are alive when they thaw out when temperatures rise.

Sigaus collinus is flightless and adults are relative large (females 32 mm), and common amongst scree and tussock. Although widespread in 2020, about 97% of the habitat of the green rock-hopper grasshopper will be lost due to global warming by 2070. The species is variable in colour; most individuals are green with yellow markings, but some are olive-grey. In the Kaikōura Ranges (Mt Luxford) S. collinus hybridises with S. nivalis, but elsewhere the two species are well differentiated.

An endemic species of mite (Erythrites jacksoni) is an ectoparasite of this grasshopper.

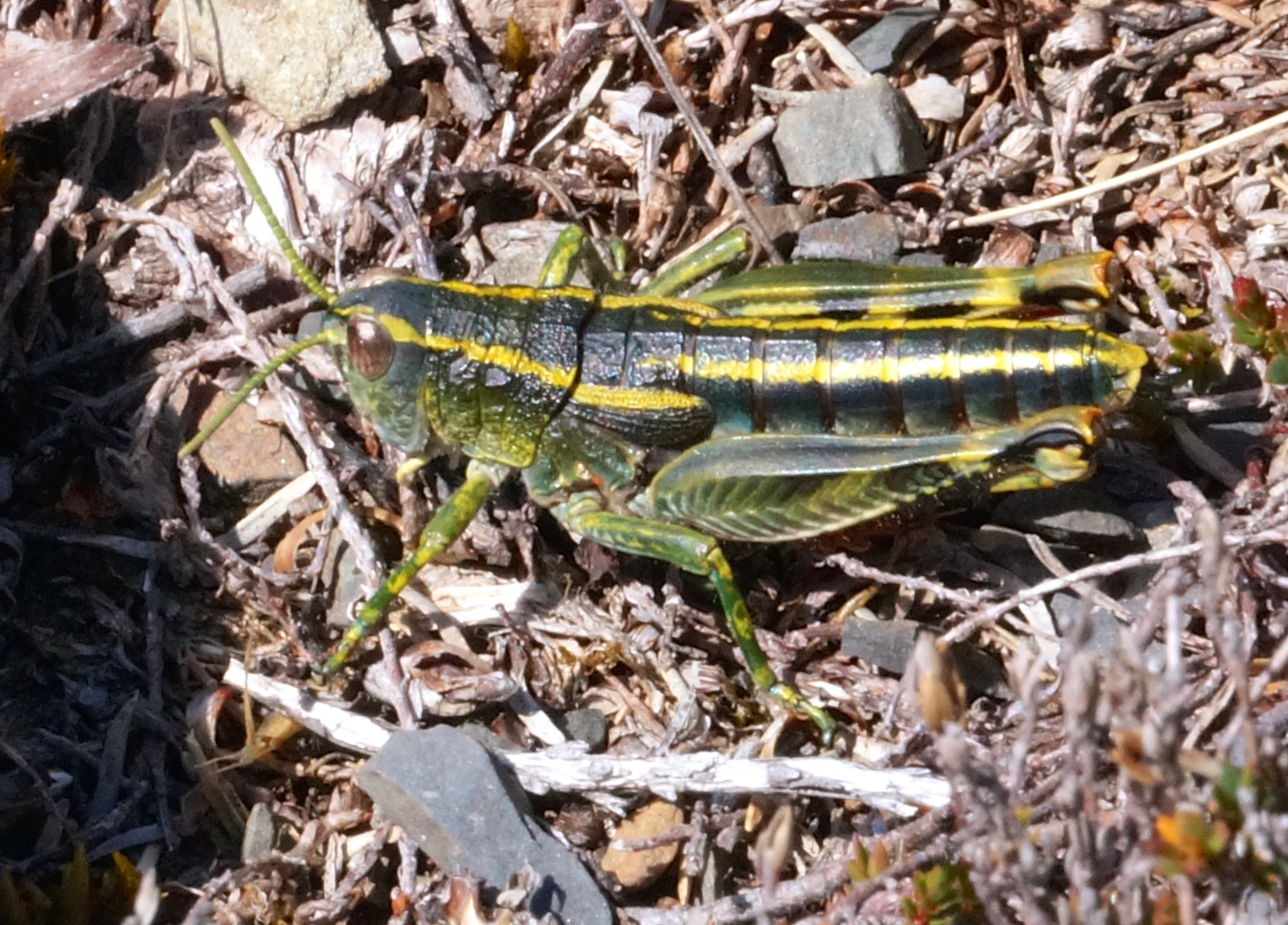
The New Zealand alpine green rock-hopper grasshopper, Brachaspis collinus, at Rainbow Ski Field, Nelson Lakes National Park (adult female)
