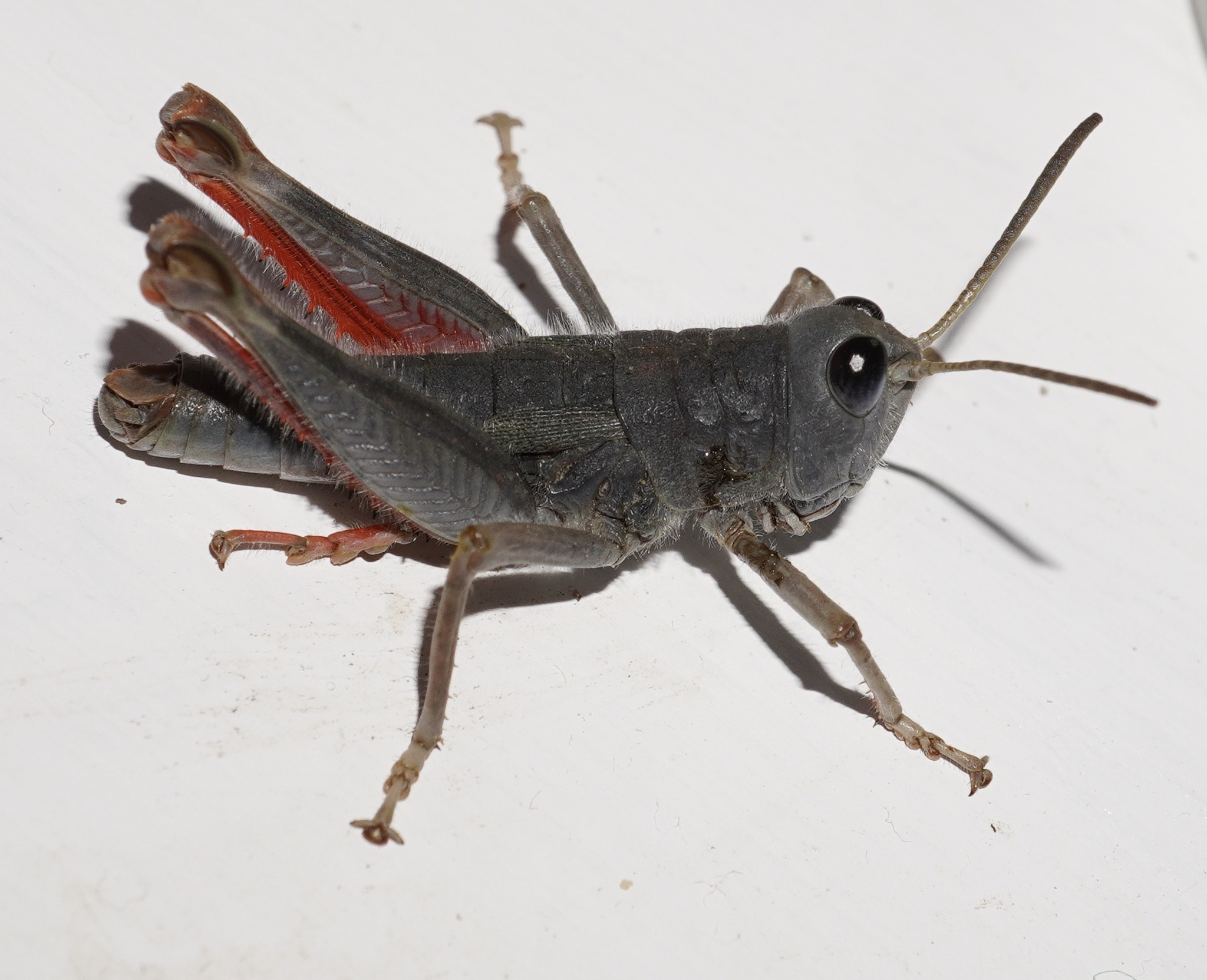
- A male specimen

Scientific classification
- Kingdom: Animalia
- Phylum: Arthropoda
- Clade: Pancrustacea
- Class: Insecta
- Order: Orthoptera
- Suborder: Caelifera
- Family: Acrididae
- Genus: Sigaus
- Species: S. villosus

Binomial name
- Sigaus villosus (Salmon, 1950)
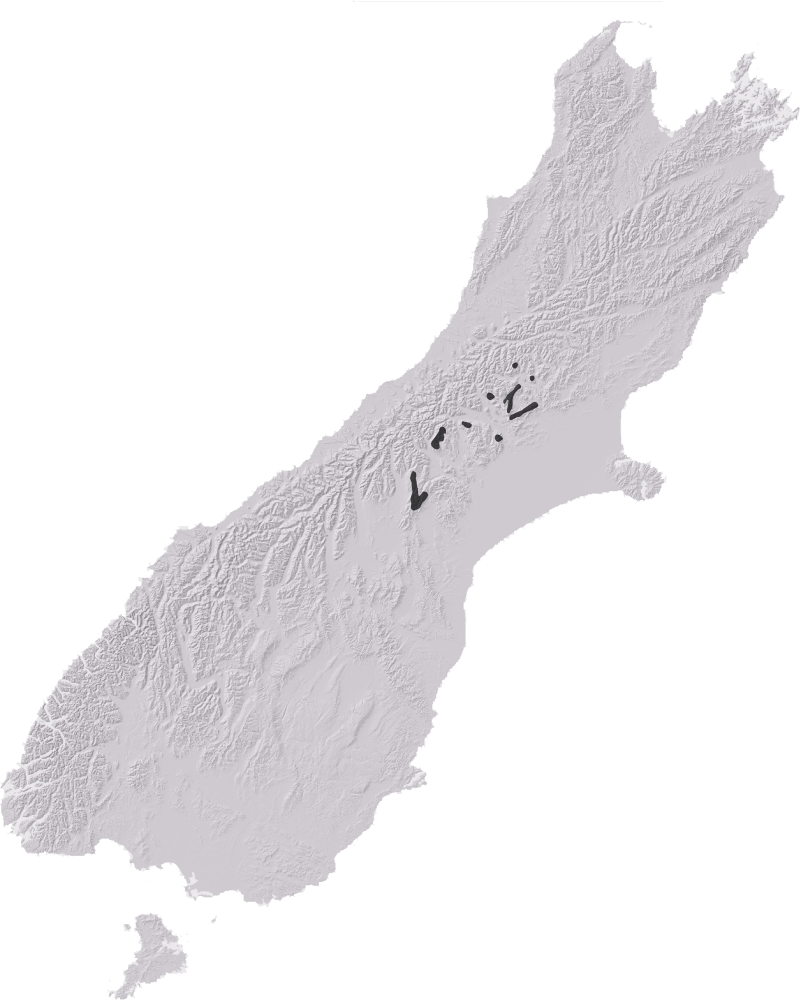
- The distribution of S. villosus in New Zealand

Synonyms
- Brachaspis villosa Salmon, 1950

= Sigaus villosus =

Species of grasshopper

Sigaus villosus is New Zealand's largest grasshopper. It is only found in the central mountains of the South Island. The genus Sigaus is endemic to New Zealand. Like all of New Zealand sub-alpine and alpine grasshoppers Sigaus villosus has a 3 or 4 year life cycle. The eggs must 'overwinter' before they will hatch. Hoppers are found throughout the year and adult grasshoppers can be found throughout the New Zealand summer between December and April. These flightless grasshoppers have distinctive black eyes.

== Distribution and habitat ==
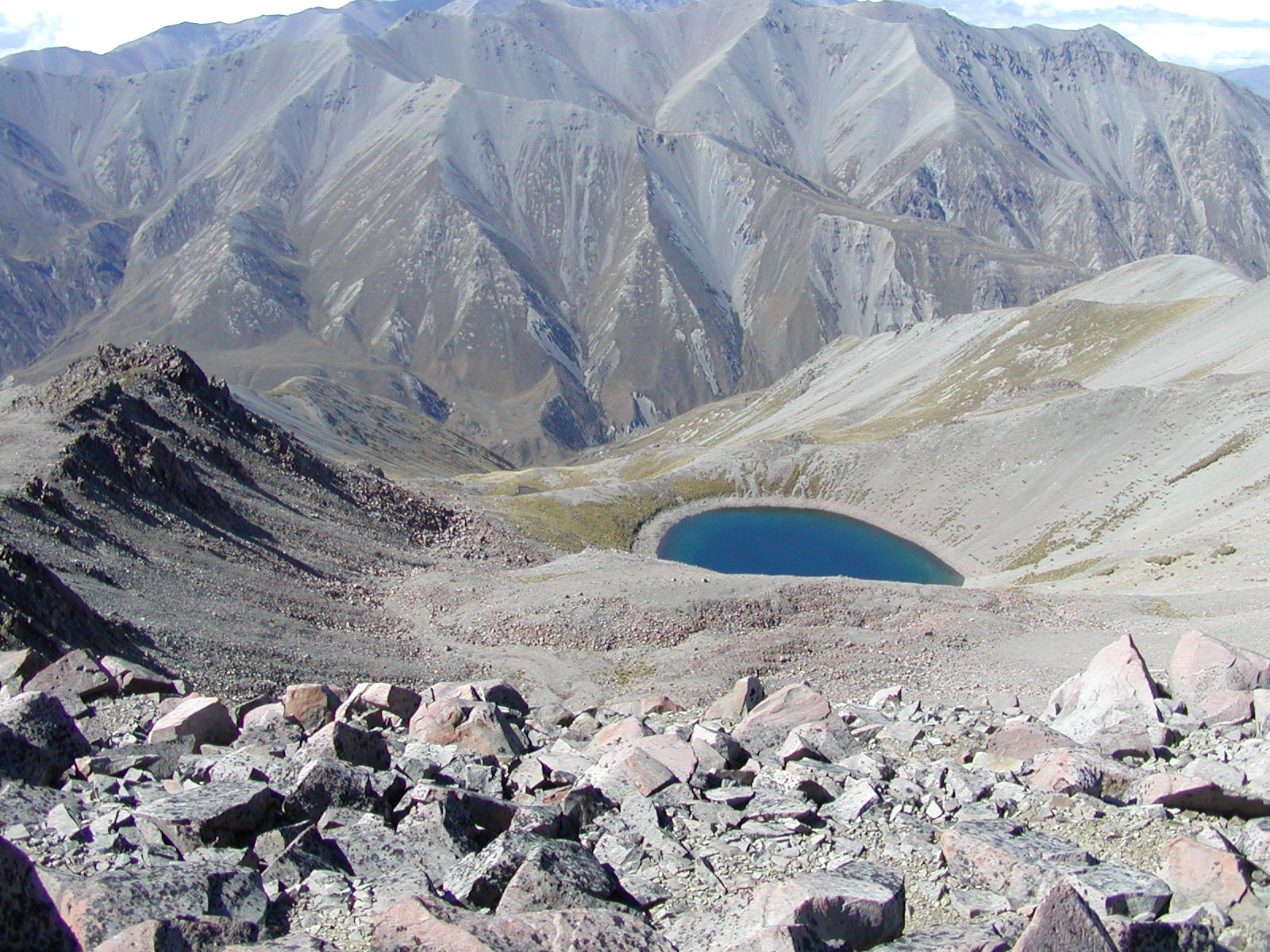
A overview of the S. villosus habitat. Lagoon Peak 43°22′29″S 171°14′16″E

Sigaus villosus is known from the central mountains of the South Island, with the largest population on the Craigieburn Range. It can be found as far south as the Fox Peak (43°50′20″S 170°47′02″E) and as far north as the Mount Wilson (42°57′32″S 171°40′32″E). The black eye grasshopper is a truly high alpine species, as it prefers open bare rocky screes between 1,900–2,100 metres (6,200–6,900 ft) in elevation. In the past, it could be found down as low as 1,320 metres (4,330 ft) at the Porters Ski Area at the bottom of long open screes (43°16′23″S 171°38′32″E). With global warming Sigaus villosus is expected to lose between 20% and 95% of its distribution.

== Species description ==
This species was first described by J. T. Salmon in 1950 and originally named Brachaspis villosa. The wings on S. villosus are micropterous (small wings) between 2–4 millimetres (0.079–0.157 in) making this species flightless like most of New Zealand grasshoppers. Sigaus villosus is sister to the North Island alpine species Sigaus piliferus.

=== Polymorphism ===
Only one colour morph are known for adults S. villosus, 'Grey'. All specimens are light grey with black coloured eyes.

=== Type information ===
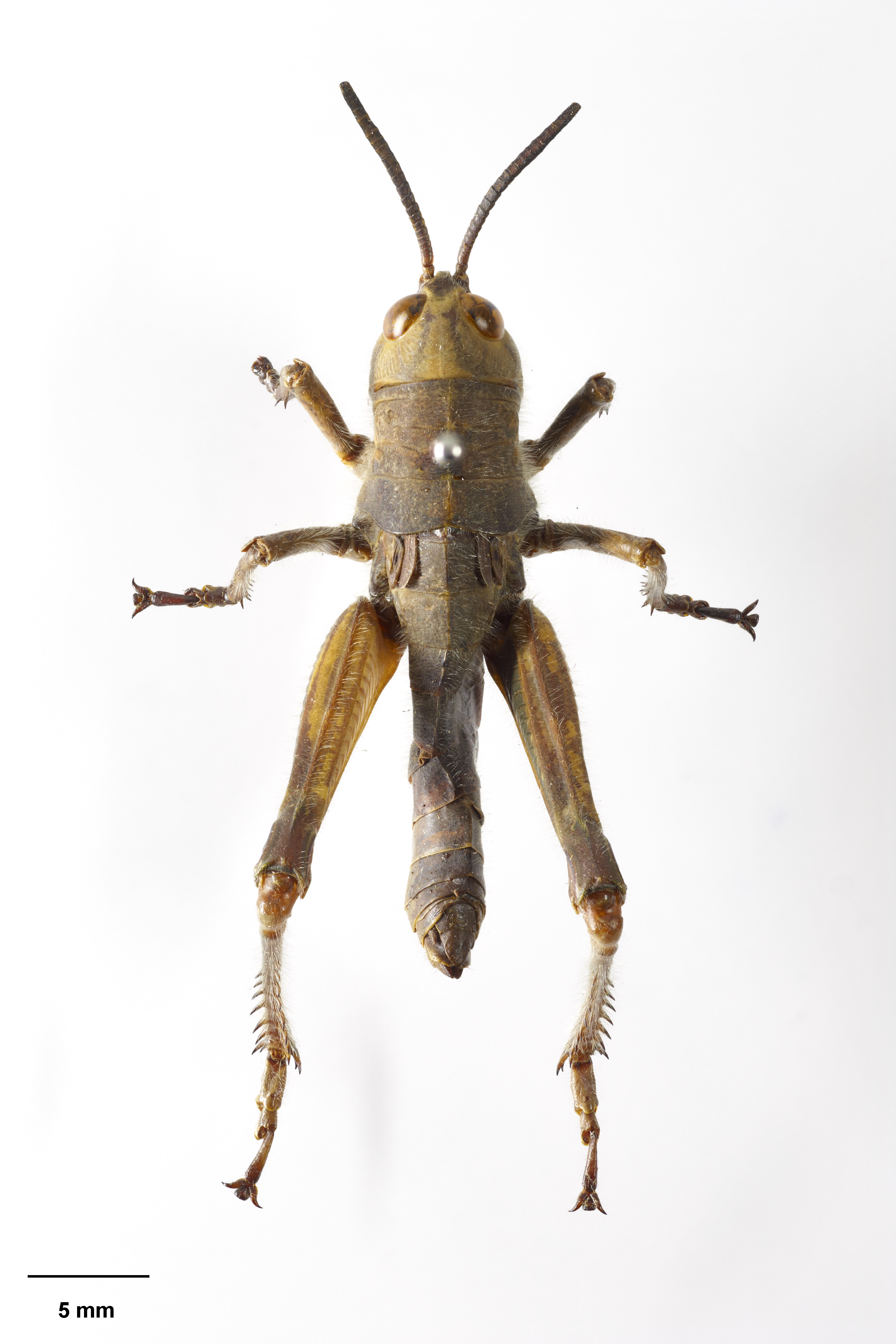
Holotype of Sigaus villosus

- Salmon, J.T. 1950: A new species of Acrididae (Insecta: Orthoptera) from New Zealand. Transactions of the Royal Society of New Zealand, Vol. 78, Part 1, page 69, February 1950
- Type locality: Mount Torlesse, 1,524–1,707 metres (5,000–5,600 ft), Canterbury. 43°15′21″S 171°49′17″E
- Type specimen: Immature female; J. T. Salmon; Holotype, Paratype and Allotype are deposited in the Museum of New Zealand Te Papa Tongarewa. Plesiotype are deposited in the Canterbury Museum, Christchurch.
