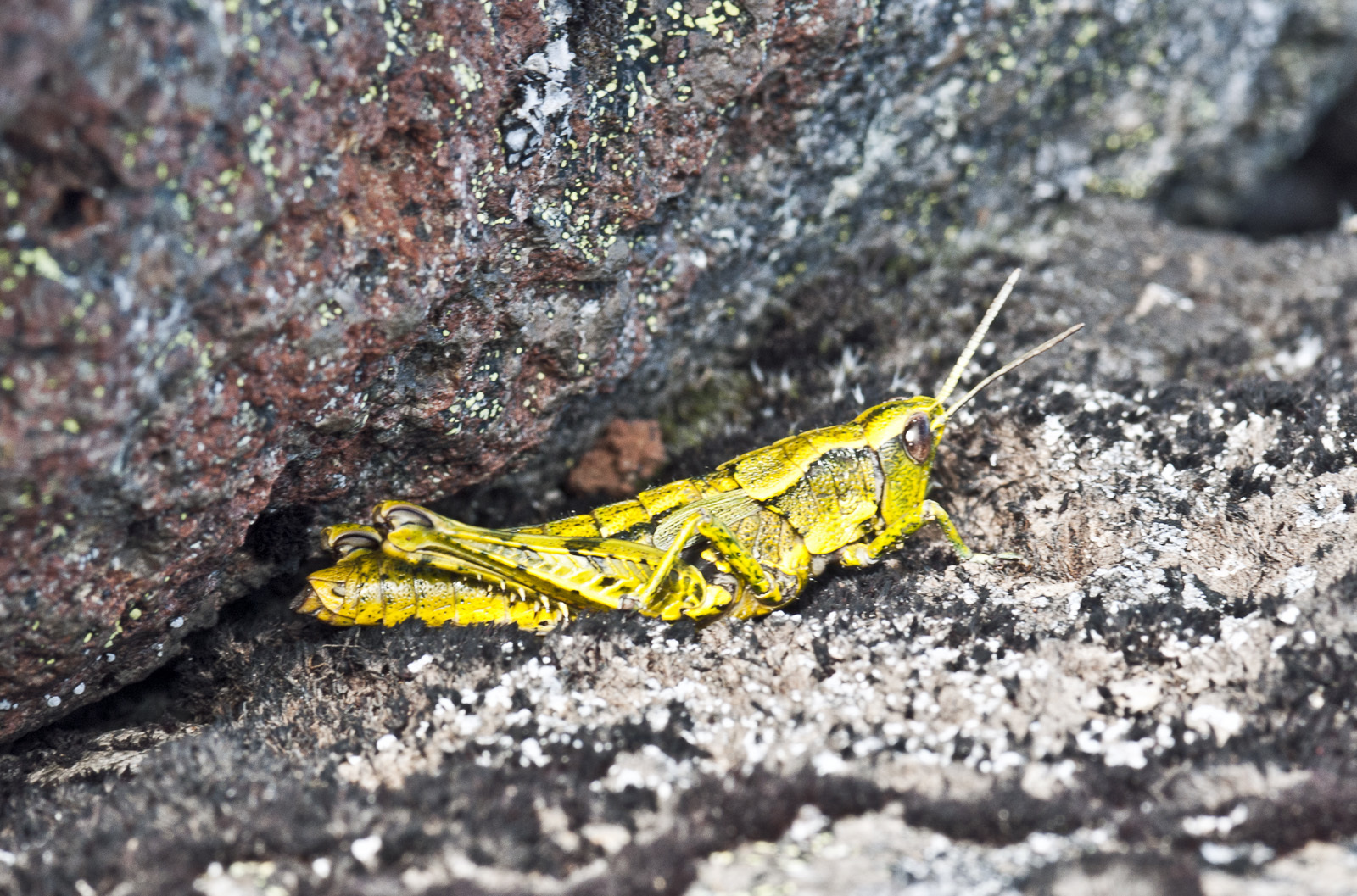
- Sigaus piliferus

Scientific classification
- Kingdom: Animalia
- Phylum: Arthropoda
- Clade: Pancrustacea
- Class: Insecta
- Order: Orthoptera
- Suborder: Caelifera
- Family: Acrididae
- Tribe: Catantopini
- Genus: Sigaus; Hutton, 1897

Species
- Sigaus australis Sigaus campestris Sigaus crassicauda Sigaus collinus Sigaus childi Sigaus dugdali Sigaus minutus Sigaus nitidus Sigaus nivalis Sigaus piliferus Sigaus robustus Sigaus tumidicauda Sigaus villosus

= Sigaus =

Genus of grasshoppers

Sigaus is a genus of grasshoppers in the tribe Catantopini that is endemic to New Zealand. All but one Sigaus species is endemic to the South Island: Sigaus piliferus is the only North Island representative and is the type species. Most species in this genus are restricted to alpine habitats. All are wingless and make no sounds.

There are thirteen species in the genus all are adapted to cold conditions, and many are coloured for camouflage against rocky ground. The largest species Sigaus villosus can reach 48mm (body length of adult female). The smallest species Sigaus minutus and S. childi are threatened with extinction.

== Taxonomy ==
The taxonomy of New Zealand endemic grasshoppers was substantially revised by Bigelow in 1967, based mostly on female genitalia, and again in 2023 using genetic data. The New Zealand radiation of cold-adapted grasshoppers is monophyletic but neither genetics nor morphology resolve distinctive genera, therefore it was suggested that all thirteen species be placed in the genus Sigaus. The genus Sigaus is distinguished from other Acrididae as flightless, silent acridids with short tegmina, crypsis colouration and endemic to New Zealand. Each species has distinctive pronotum shape and structures of the internal male genitalia: the epiphallus lophi are saddle-like in shape with the mesal protuberance of the lophus having a smooth, rounded outline. The genus is monophyletic and sister to grasshoppers from Tasmania, Australia.

	Sigaus australis	Sigaus campestris	Sigaus childi	Sigaus australis (homerensis)	Sigaus minutus	Sigaus piliferus	Sigaus australis (obelisci)	Sigaus australis (takahe)	Sigaus villosus
Photograph									
Elevation	1,300–1,700 m (4,300–5,600 ft)	400–1,500 m (1,300–4,900 ft)	200–500 m (660–1,600 ft)	900–1,000 m (3,000–3,300 ft)	300–800 m (980–2,600 ft)		1,600–1,800 m (5,200–5,900 ft)	1,000–1,400 m (5,900–6,900 ft)	1,800–2,100 m (–6,900 ft)
Described	1897; Hutton	1897; Hutton	1999; Jamieson	2003; Morris	1967; Bigelow	1897; Hutton	1967; Bigelow	2003; Morris	1950; Salmon
Habitat	Tussock grasslands	Dry rocky hillsides/ tussock grasslands	Dry rocky hillsides	Tussock grasslands	Fluvial outwash	Tussock grasslands	Alpine lichen fields	Tussock grasslands	Scree
Polymorphism	Highly cryptic	Highly cryptic	Highly cryptic	2	Highly cryptic	2	Highly cryptic		1
Regions	Canterbury; Otago	Canterbury; Otago; Southland	Otago	Southland	Canterbury	Waikato; Gisborne; Hawke's Bay; Manawatū-Whanganui; Wellington	Otago	Southland	Canterbury
Size	Medium	Medium/large	Medium	Medium	Very small	Large	Large	Medium	Large
Status	Not threatened	Not threatened	Nationally Critical	Range Restricted	Nationally Endangered	Not threatened	Range Restricted	Range Restricted	Not threatened
Wings	Micropterous; 2–3 mm	Micropterous; 2–3 mm	Micropterous; 1–2 mm	Micropterous; 2–3 mm	Micropterous; 1 mm		Micropterous; 3–4 mm	Micropterous; 3–4 mm	Micropterous; 2–4 mm
