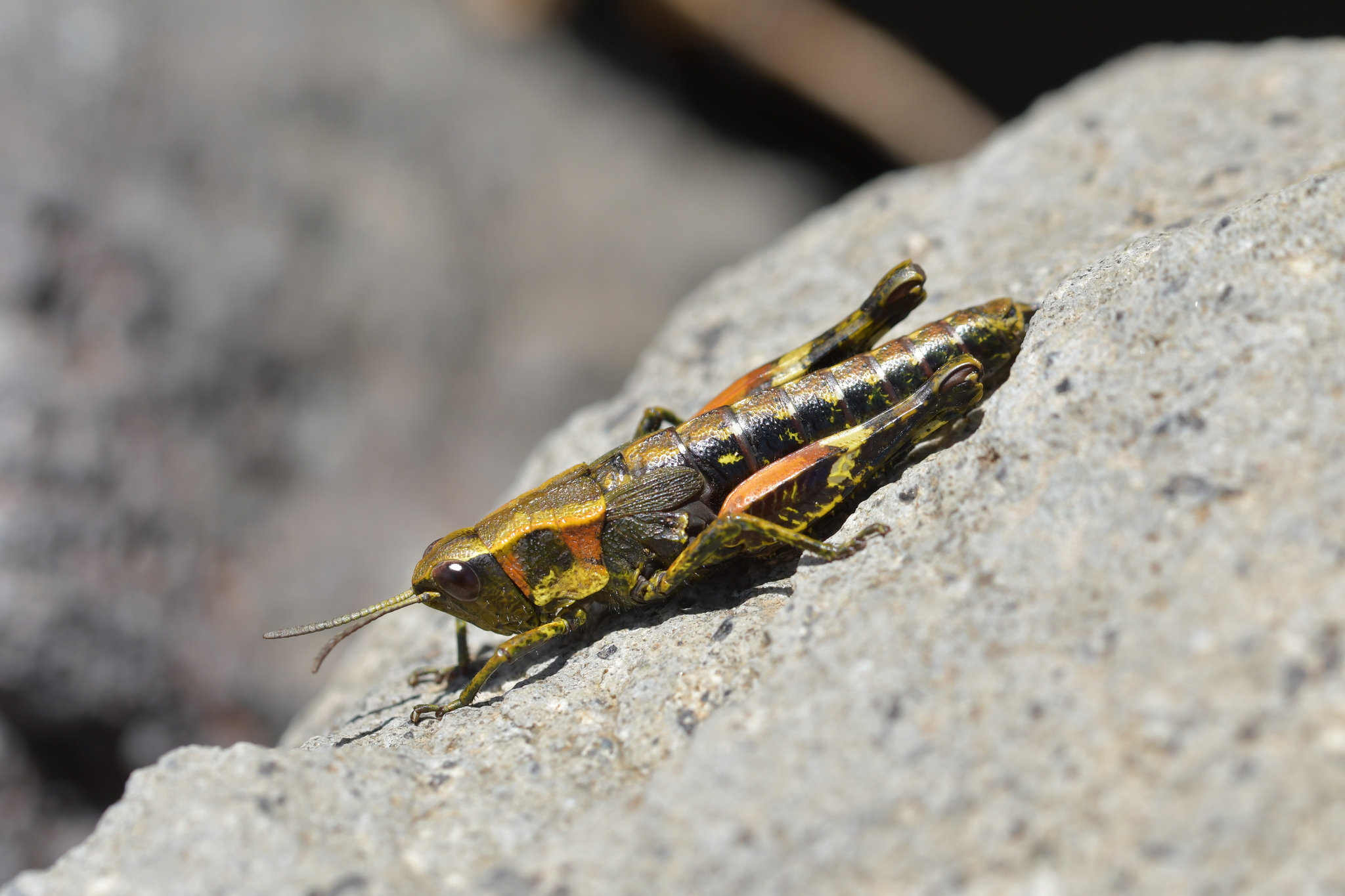

Scientific classification
- Kingdom: Animalia
- Phylum: Arthropoda
- Clade: Pancrustacea
- Class: Insecta
- Order: Orthoptera
- Suborder: Caelifera
- Family: Acrididae
- Subfamily: Catantopinae
- Tribe: Catantopini
- Genus: Sigaus
- Species: S. piliferus

Binomial name
- Sigaus piliferus Hutton, 1898

= Sigaus piliferus =

Species of short-horned grasshopper

Sigaus piliferus is a species of short-horned grasshopper in the family Acrididae. It is found in New Zealand. Sigaus piliferus is restricted to alpine and sub-alpine habitats in North Island New Zealand. This grasshopper species has two ecotypes - the shrubland form in the north with relatively long legs and the alpine form in the south. The two ecotypes were probably isolated during the last glacial maximum but are now in contact in the central volcanic region of North Island.
