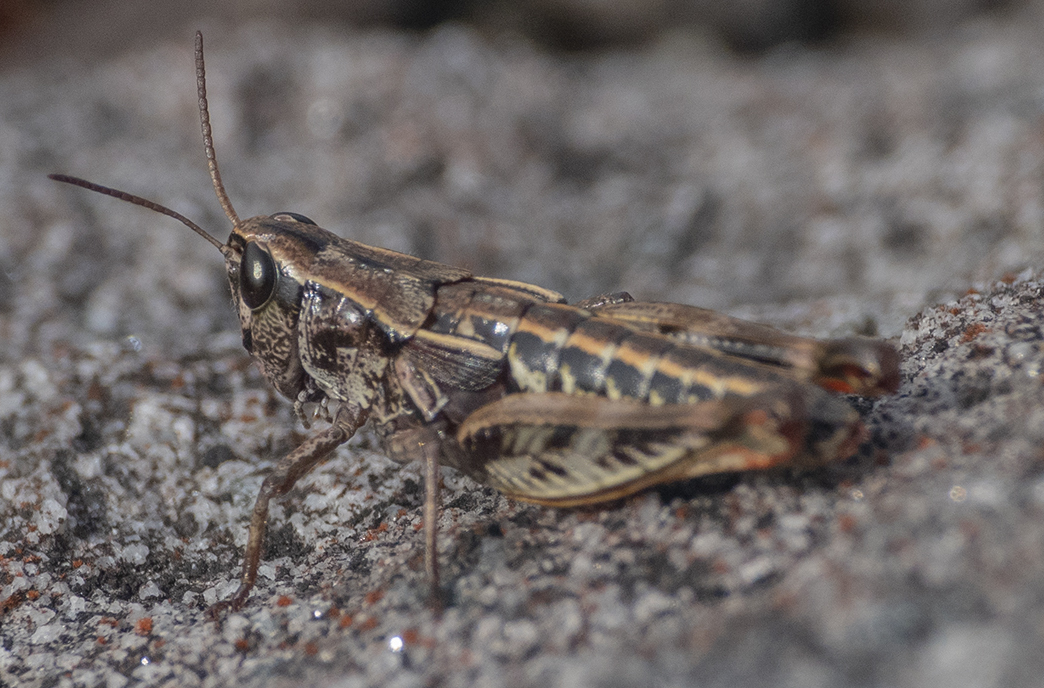

Conservation status
- Not Threatened (NZ TCS)

Scientific classification
- Kingdom: Animalia
- Phylum: Arthropoda
- Clade: Pancrustacea
- Class: Insecta
- Order: Orthoptera
- Suborder: Caelifera
- Family: Acrididae
- Genus: Sigaus
- Species: S. crassicauda

Binomial name
- Sigaus crassicauda (Bigelow, 1967)
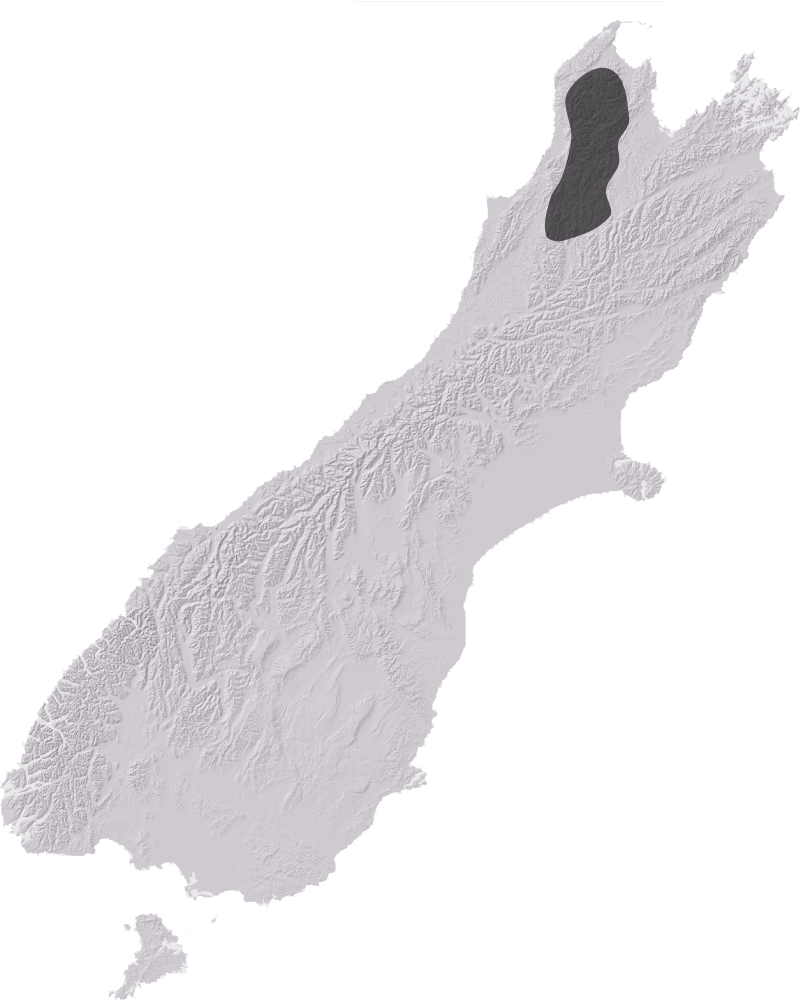
- The distribution of S. crassicauda in New Zealand

= Sigaus crassicauda =

Species of grasshopper

Sigaus crassicauda is a species of alpine grasshopper endemic to New Zealand. Like all of New Zealand sub-alpine and alpine grasshoppers S. crassicauda has a 2 or 3 years life cycle. The eggs must ‘overwinter’ before they will hatch. Grasshoppers are found throughout the year and adult grasshoppers can be found throughout the New Zealand summer between December and April. Sigaus crassicauda cannot fly.

== Distribution and habitat ==
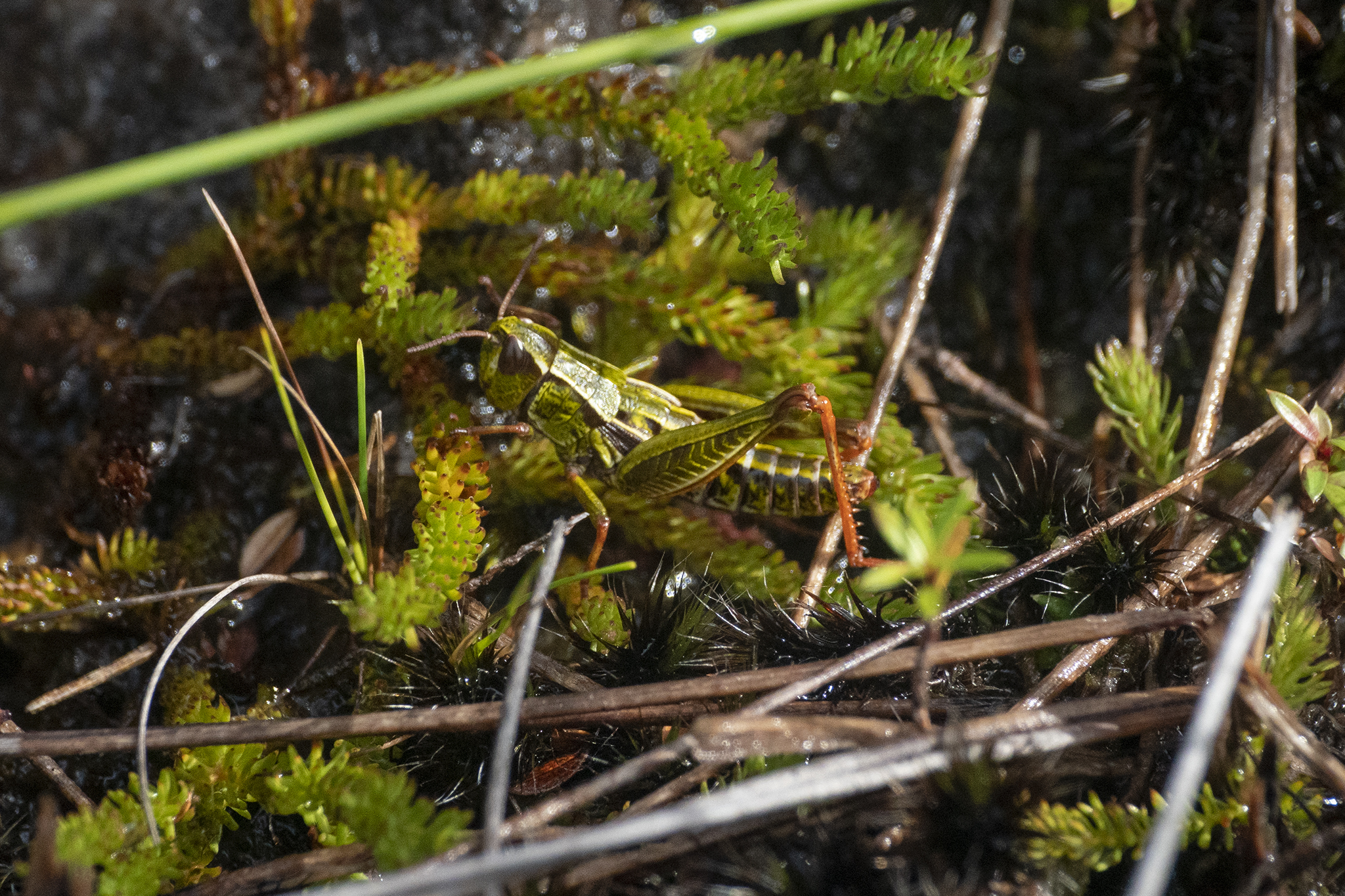
Sigaus crassicauda among the flora of the Denniston Plateau

Sigaus crassicauda is only known from West Coast Region and Tasman Region of New Zealand. It can be found as far south as the Right Branch of the Rahu River, Spring Junction (42°17′31″S 172°07′24″E) and as far north as the Thousand Acres Plateau, Matiri Range (41°35′37″S 172°19′21″E). Alpinacris crassicauda prefer alpine tussock grasslands between 1,200–1,500 metres (3,900–4,900 ft), however, can be found as low as 1,020 metres (3,350 ft) on the Thousand Acres Plateau, Matiri Range (41°35′37″S 172°19′21″E). Climate change is likely to reduce the suitable habitat that this species can occupy by 10 - 60% of its current range.

== Species description ==
The wings on S. tumidicauda are micropterous (small wings) between 2–4 millimetres (0.079–0.157 in) making this species flightless like most of New Zealand grasshoppers. Male body length 18–22 millimetres (0.71–0.87 in); Female body length 25–35 millimetres (0.98–1.38 in).

Sigaus crassicauda was described in 1967 by Robert Sidney Bigelow, in the genus Alpinacris, with type locality of Lead Hills, Boulder Lake (40°53′35″S 172°32′56″E). A male holotype and paratype are deposited in the Canterbury Museum, Christchurch.

=== Type information ===
- Bigelow, R.S. 1967: The Grasshoppers of New Zealand, Their Taxonomy and Distribution. University of Canterbury, Christchurch.
- Type locality: Lead Hills, Boulder Lake, Tasman Region. 40°53′35″S 172°32′56″E
- Type specimen: Male; 27 October 1963; P. M. & M Johns. Holotype and Paratype are deposited in the Canterbury Museum, Christchurch.

== Conservation status ==
Under the New Zealand Threat Classification System, this species is listed as "Not Threatened".
