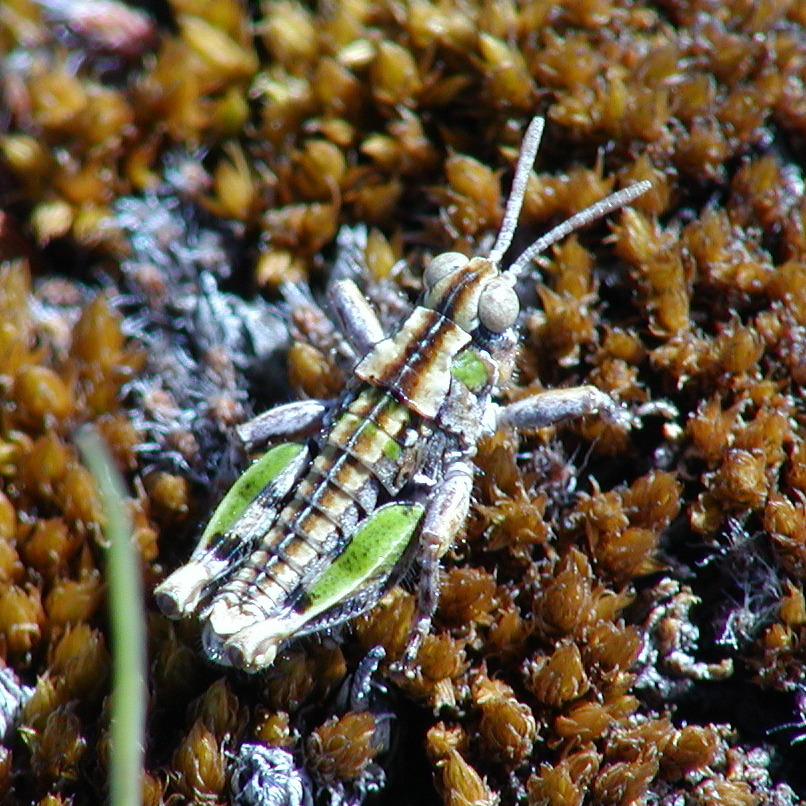

Conservation status
- Declining (NZ TCS)

Scientific classification
- Kingdom: Animalia
- Phylum: Arthropoda
- Clade: Pancrustacea
- Class: Insecta
- Order: Orthoptera
- Suborder: Caelifera
- Family: Acrididae
- Genus: Sigaus
- Species: S. minutus

Binomial name
- Sigaus minutus Bigelow, 1967

= Sigaus minutus =

Species of grasshopper

Sigaus minutus is a species of short-horned grasshopper in the family Acrididae. It is one of the smallest and rarest species of grasshopper in New Zealand, found only in the Mackenzie district of South Island. There are 13 species within the genus Sigaus described by Bigelow (1967), all endemic to New Zealand. The population status of Sigaus minutus is declining according to threat assessments made by orthopteran experts in 2010.

== Habitat and distribution ==
Sigaus minutus is found near Lake Tekapo, Lindis Pass and in the Mackenzie district, South Island, New Zealand. It has also been observed near Alexandra in Otago. This grasshopper is very well camouflaged on stony surfaces and amongst lichen. It is absent in areas of dense vegetation as it needs to bask.

== Morphological characters ==
Sigaus minutus is one of the smallest Sigaus species but very similar to the Otago species S. childi. Genetically, S. minutus is sister to the alpine species S. campestris from central and southern South Island mountains. As seen in most New Zealand grasshoppers, these species are all without functioning wings and their cryptic colouring is variable within populations but always aids camouflage. Females are larger than males.

=== Dimensions ===
Adult male: length 9–10 mm, pronotum length 1.6-1.9 mm, pronotum width 1.80-2.20 mm, femur length 4.90-5.60 mm, femur width 1.60-1.90 mm.

Adult female: length 14 –16 mm, pronotum length 2.50-2.65 mm, pronotum width 3.05- 3.30 mm, femur length 7.00-7.20 mm, femur width 2.10-2.50 mm.

=== External characters ===
FEMALE

The fastigium is concave with upraised margins and bumps laterally on posterior margin. Posterior margin of pronotum sinuate with broad indent medially, sometimes with small v within the broad indentation (Bigelow, 1967). The character differentiating S. minutus from S. childi is the absence of a second pronotum suculus.

MALE

Genitalia: principal lobes of lophi tongue-shaped, Mesal lobes very round projecting medially. Ancorae present, with bulbous swelling when viewed dorso-caudally narrowing to an inwardly directed point. Dorsal sclerite well developed as in other members of this genus, with broad lateral arms converging to form a broad, blunt, upturned projection with swelling at apex projecting caudal. Large swollen shell-shaped supraramus closely flanking the aedeagus. Dorsal aedeagal sclerites large and swollen, ventral aedeagal sclerites long.

Cryptic colour variation in Sigaus minutus

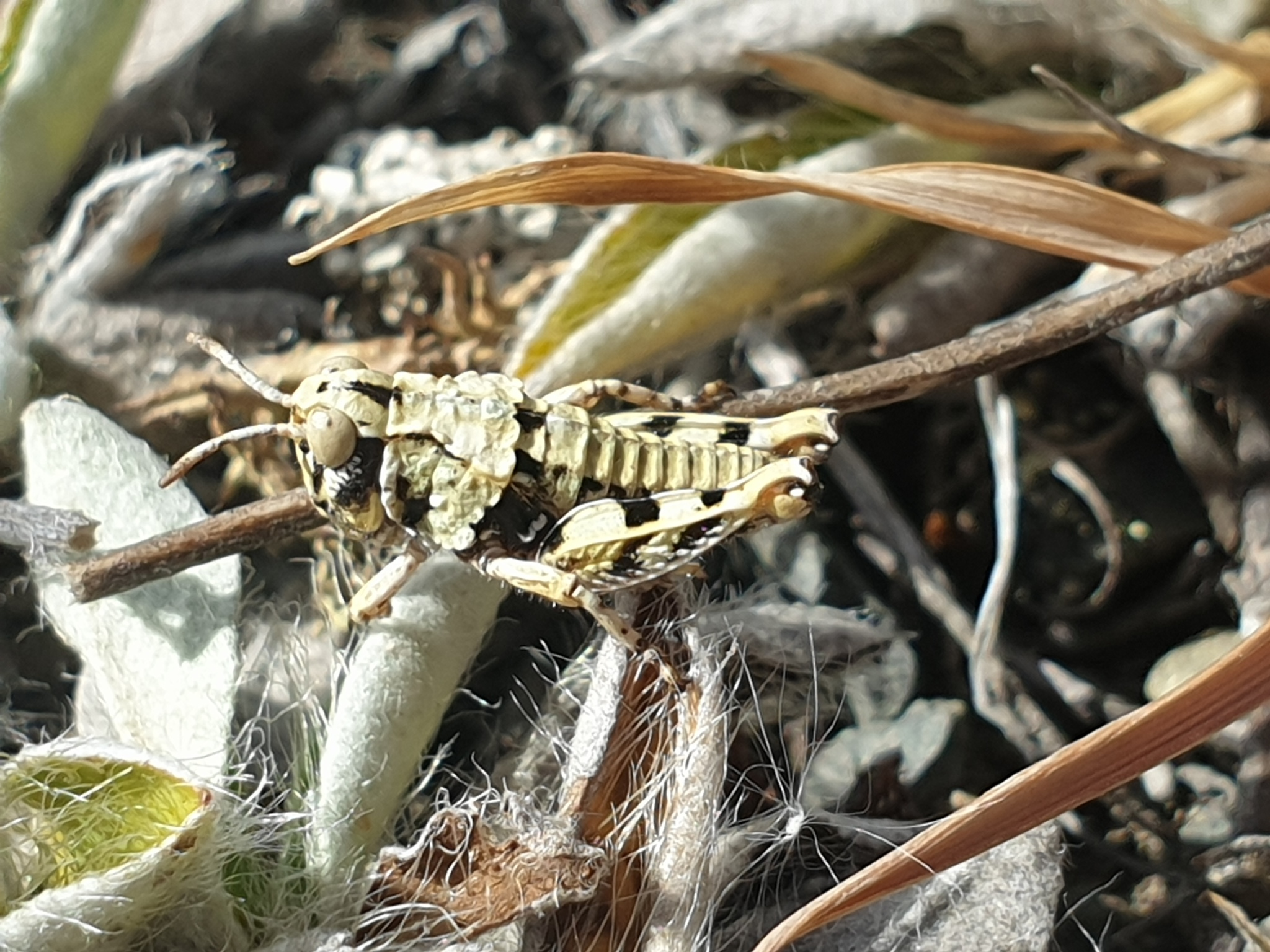

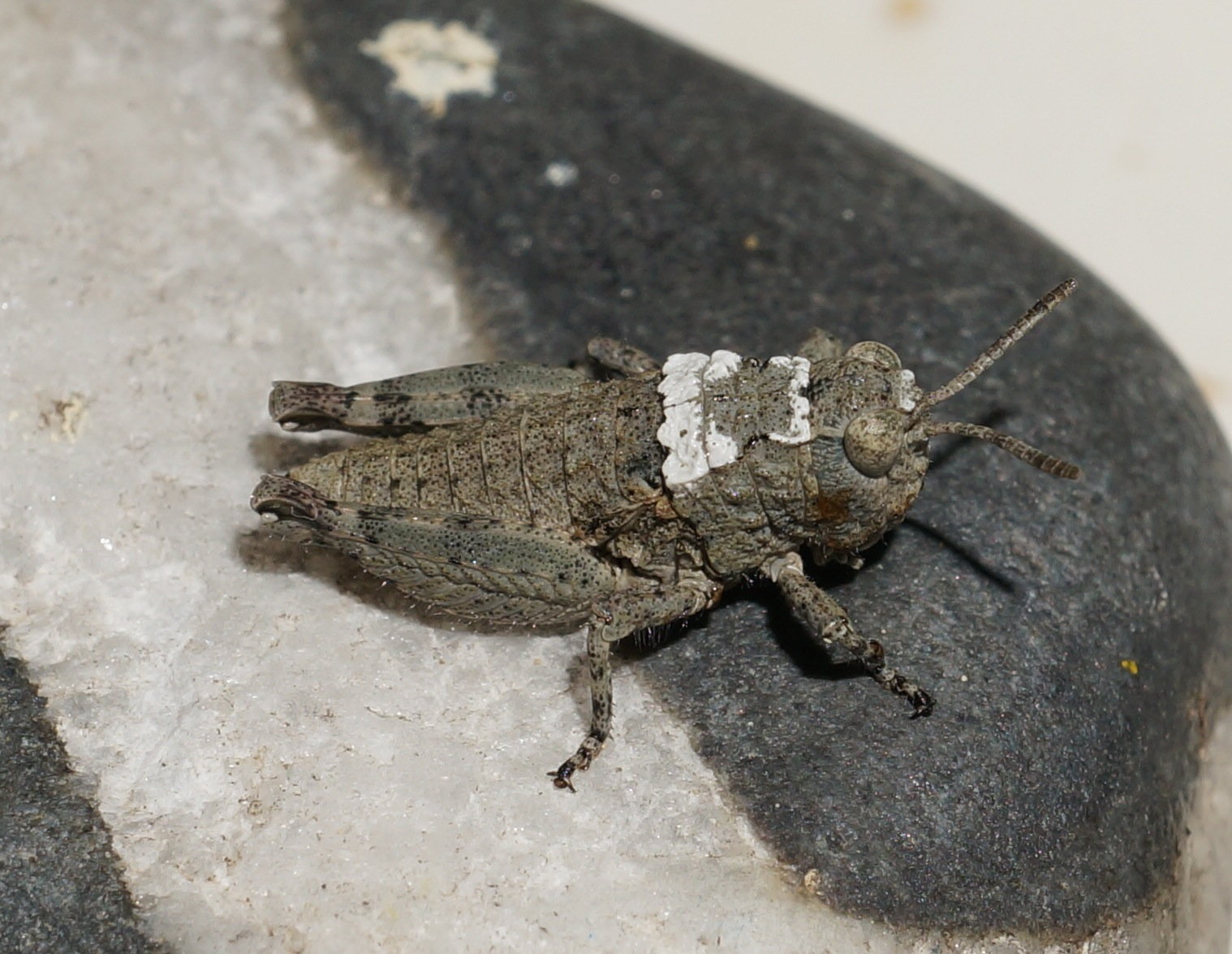

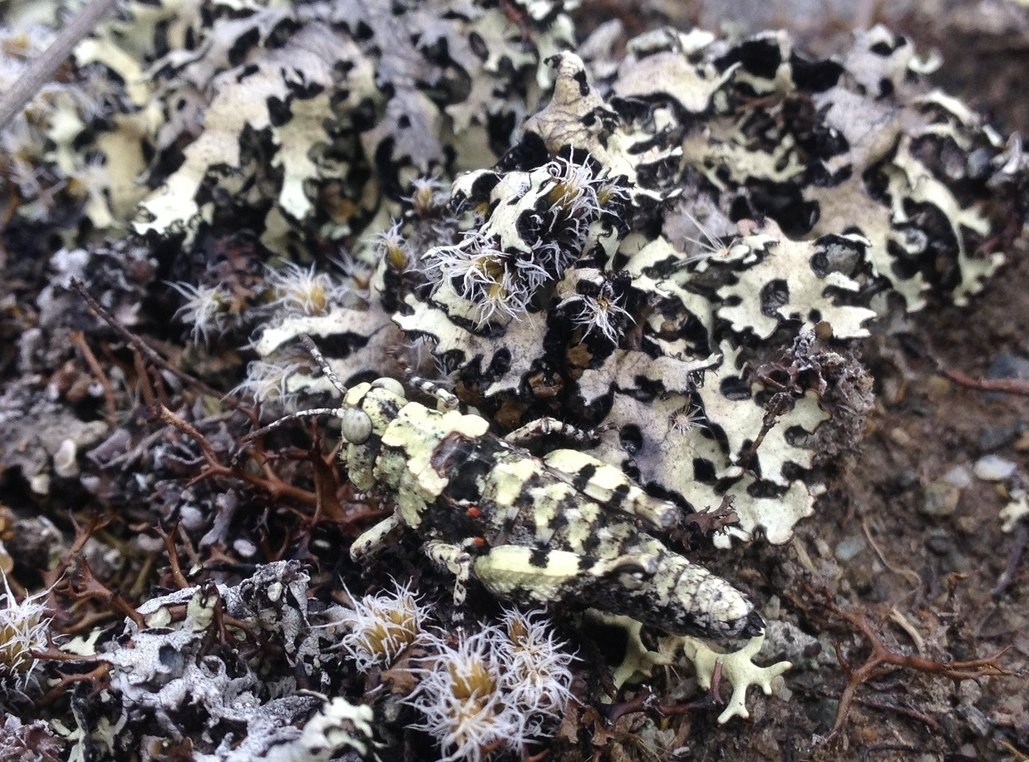

== Behavior ==
As with other New Zealand grasshoppers, S. minutus is a diurnal herbivore, requiring open ground to bask. Males are smaller than females when adult and will remain on the back on the females (in copula) during prolonged mating. Eggs are laid in the soil.

== Areas for conservation ==
The majority of populations of S. minutus are on small isolated patches of privately owned farmland where land management practices will ensure their extinction. In a survey of 20 sites on Crawford Hills Rd, Alexandra (Jamieson & Manly 1997), no Sigaus childi or S. minutus were found on land which is in pasture, used for growing orchards, or being irrigated. Experiments have shown that acridids cannot tolerate insecticides or herbicides and are very sensitive to heavy metals and fertilizers in the soil.
