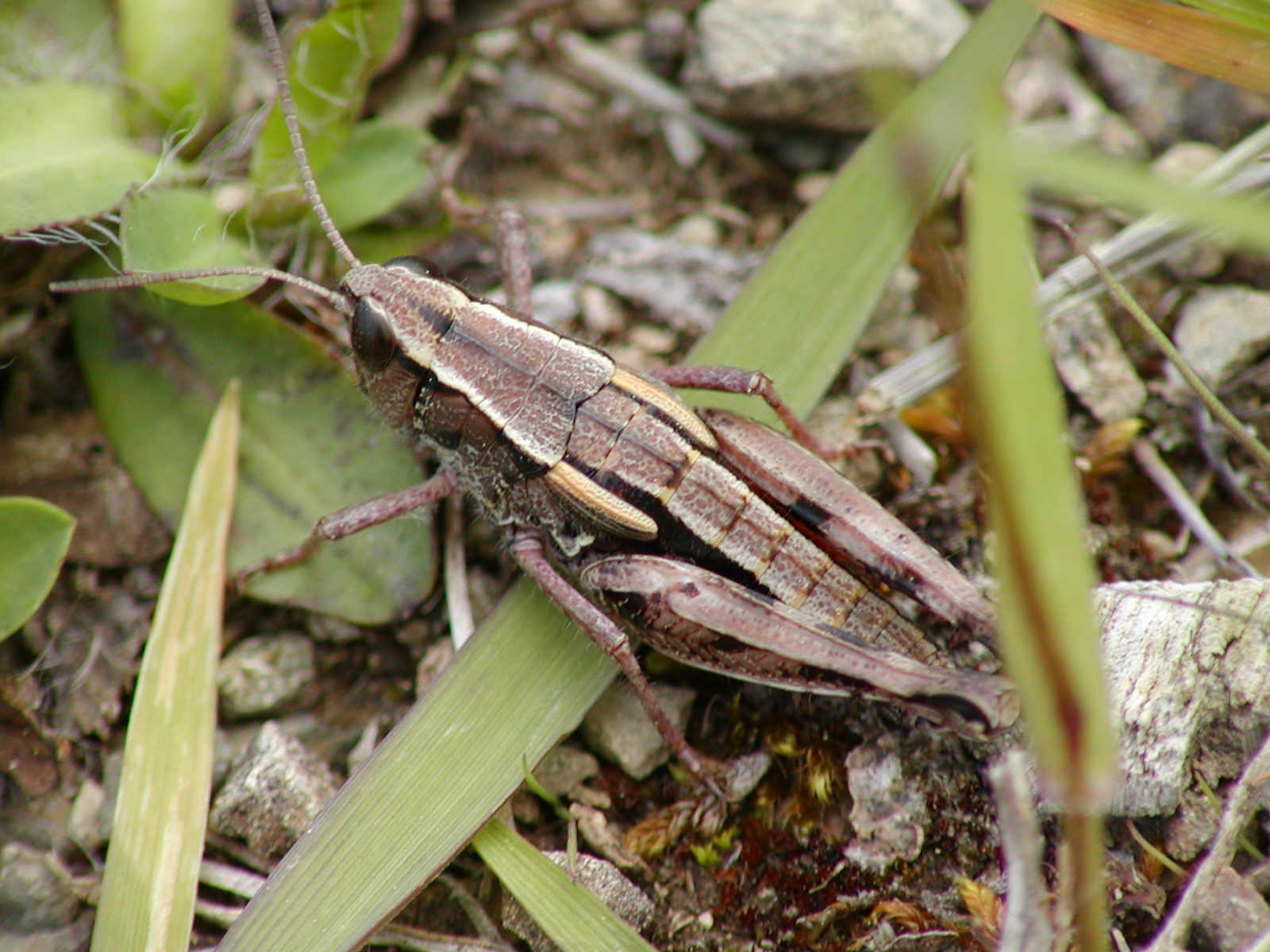
- A female Sigaus australis

Scientific classification
- Kingdom: Animalia
- Phylum: Arthropoda
- Clade: Pancrustacea
- Class: Insecta
- Order: Orthoptera
- Suborder: Caelifera
- Family: Acrididae
- Genus: Sigaus
- Species: S. australis

Binomial name
- Sigaus australis (Bigelow, 1967)
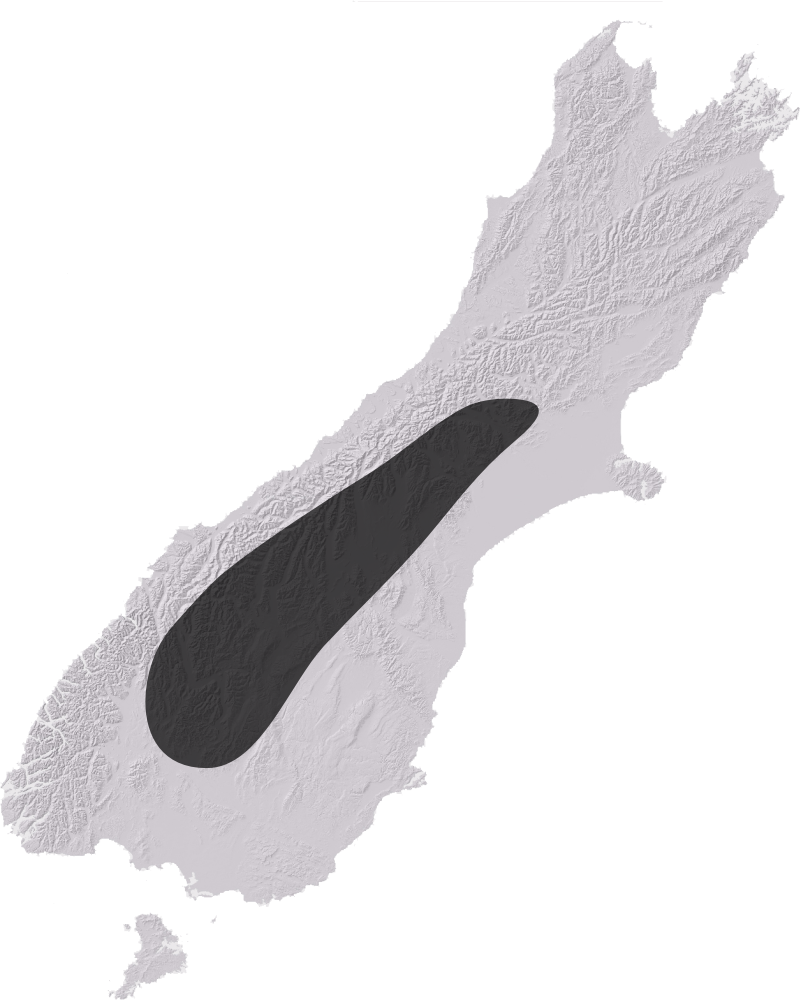
- The distribution of Sigaus australis in New Zealand

= Sigaus australis =

Species of grasshopper

Sigaus australis is the most common alpine grasshopper found in New Zealand. It can be found in the southern half of the South Island above the tree line. Sigaus australis was described in 1897 by Frederick Hutton. Like all of New Zealand sub-alpine and alpine grasshoppers S. australis has a 2 or 3 years life cycle. Individuals can survive the cold by freezing solid at any life stage, at any time of the year. Sigaus australis adults are relatively large grasshoppers (females ~ 26mm, 0.8g). The genus Sigaus is endemic to New Zealand.

== Distribution and habitat ==
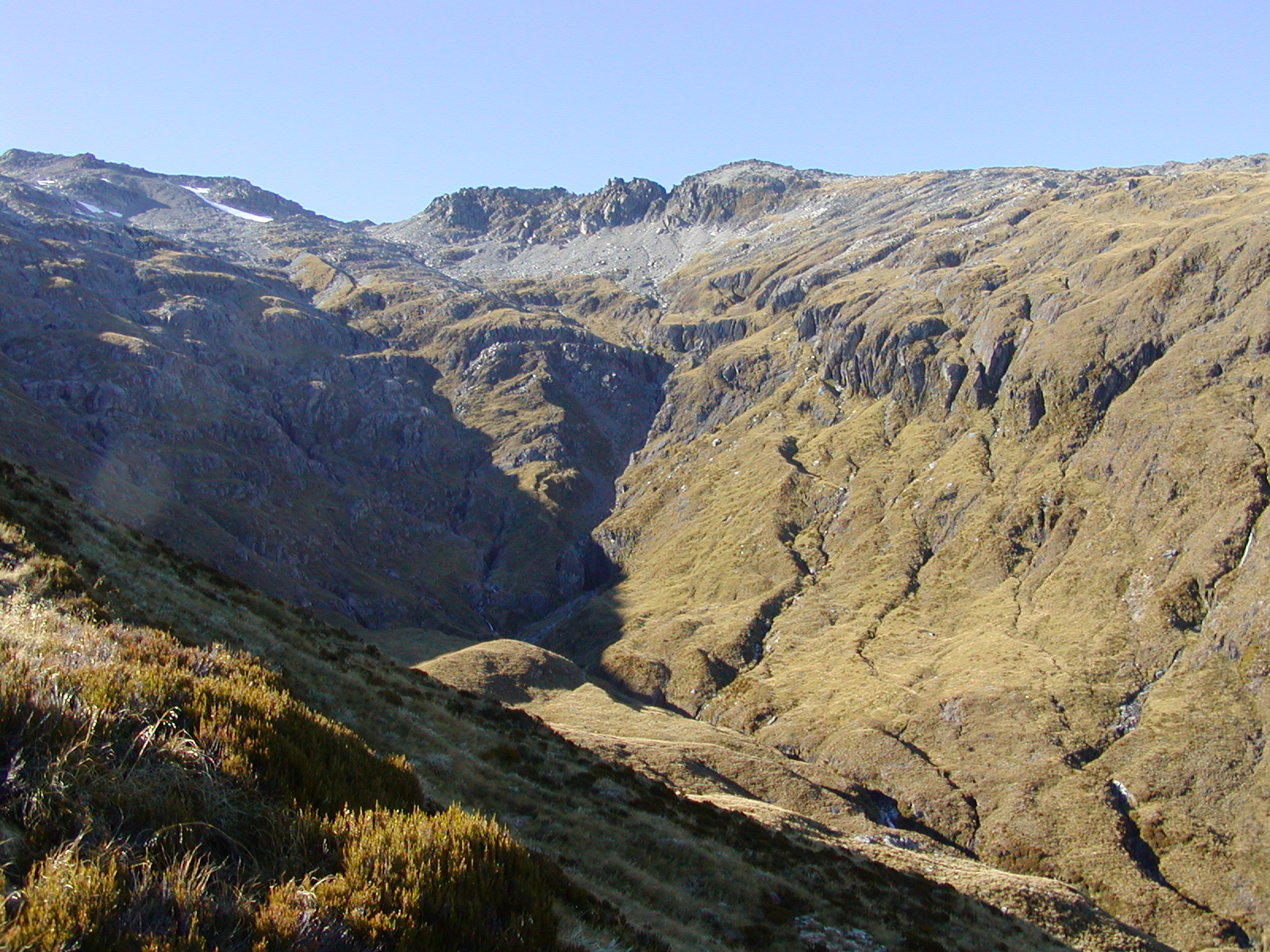
An overview of the S. australis habitat. Mount Armstrong 44°05′15″S 169°25′27″E

Sigaus australis can be found in the southern half of the South Island, from Otago and Canterbury regions. It can be found as far south as the Takitimu Mountains and as far north as the Torless Range (43°14′39″S 171°48′34″E). Sigaus australis prefer tussock grasslands between 1,300–1,700 metres (4,300–5,600 ft) elevation, however, can be found as low as 200 metres (660 ft) on the Alexandra Tailings, (45°14′49″S 169°22′07″E) and as high as 2,000 metres (6,600 ft) on Smite Peak (43°21′10″S 171°14′17″E). Evidence from mtDNA sequencing suggests that S. australis encompasses several narrow endemic taxa and one widespread species.Sigaus australis would have been more widespread during the last glacial period with both morphological and genetic signature of greater population connectivity in the past. With climate warming and low dispersal potential, S. australis will probably lose 75% to 93% of its suitable habitat by 2070.

Sigaus australis eats hundreds of different plant species but avoids the abundant snow tussocks (Chionochloa spp.) and eats soft dicotyledonous plants including introduced hawkweeds and dandelion.

== Species description ==
The wings on S. australis are micropterous (small wings) between 2–4 millimetres (0.079–0.157 in) making this species flightless like most of New Zealand grasshoppers. Sigaus australis is highly cryptic, with colour polymorphism. They will match the surrounding vegetation with colours of green and earth tones.

== Type Information ==
Paprides australis Hutton (1897:147)

- Hutton, F.W. 1897: The grasshopper and locusts of New Zealand and the Kermadec Island. Proc. Trans. NZ Inst. 30: 135-50
- Type locality: Probably from Glenorchy, Lake Wakatipu, Otago. 44°51′05″S 168°23′16″E.
- Type specimen: Female; C Chilton; Holotype and Lectotype are deposited in the Canterbury Museum, Christchurch.

Paprides torquatus Hutton (1898:47)

- Hutton, F.W. 1898: Notes on the New Zealand. Proc. Trans. NZ Inst. 31: 44-50
- Type locality: Probably from Mount Torlesse, Canterbury. 43°15′23″S 171°49′16″E.
- Type specimen: Male; Holotype deposited in the Canterbury Museum, Christchurch.

Paprides armillaus Hutton (1898:47-48)

- Hutton, F.W. 1898: Notes on the New Zealand. Proc. Trans. NZ Inst. 31: 44-50
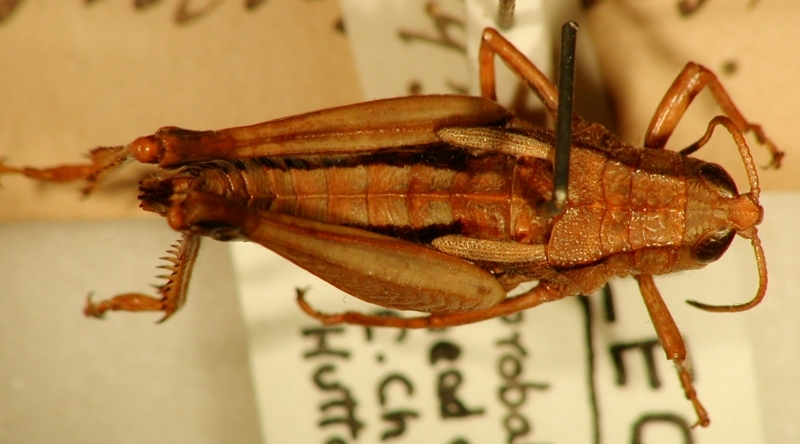
Paprides australis; Holotype and Lectotype.

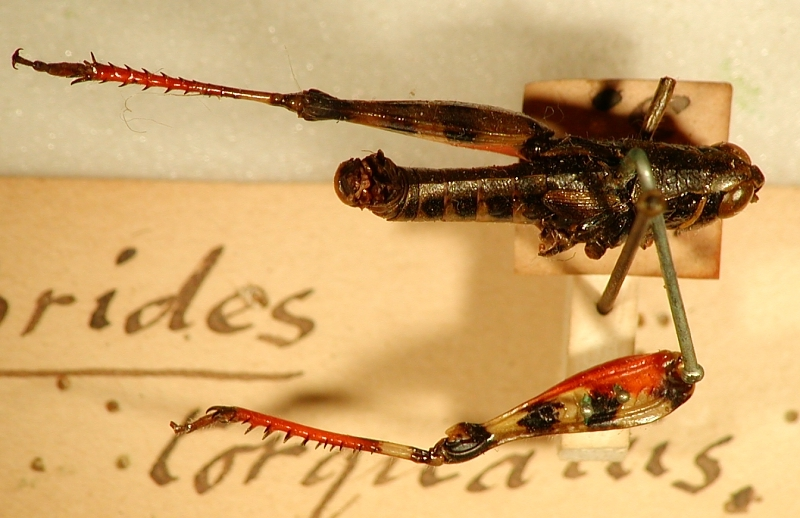
Paprides torquatus; Holotype.

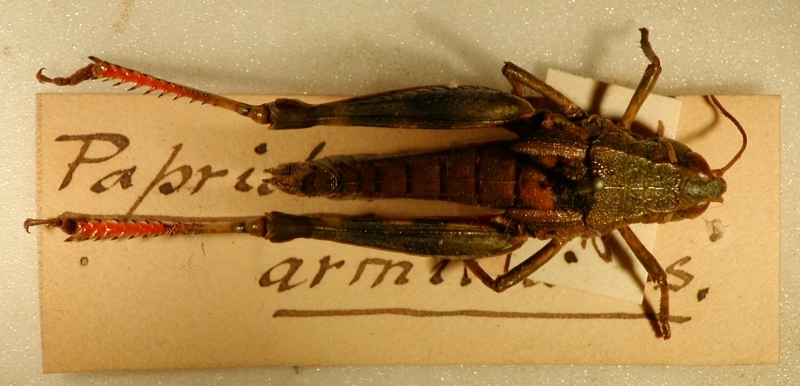
Paprides armillaus; Holotype.
