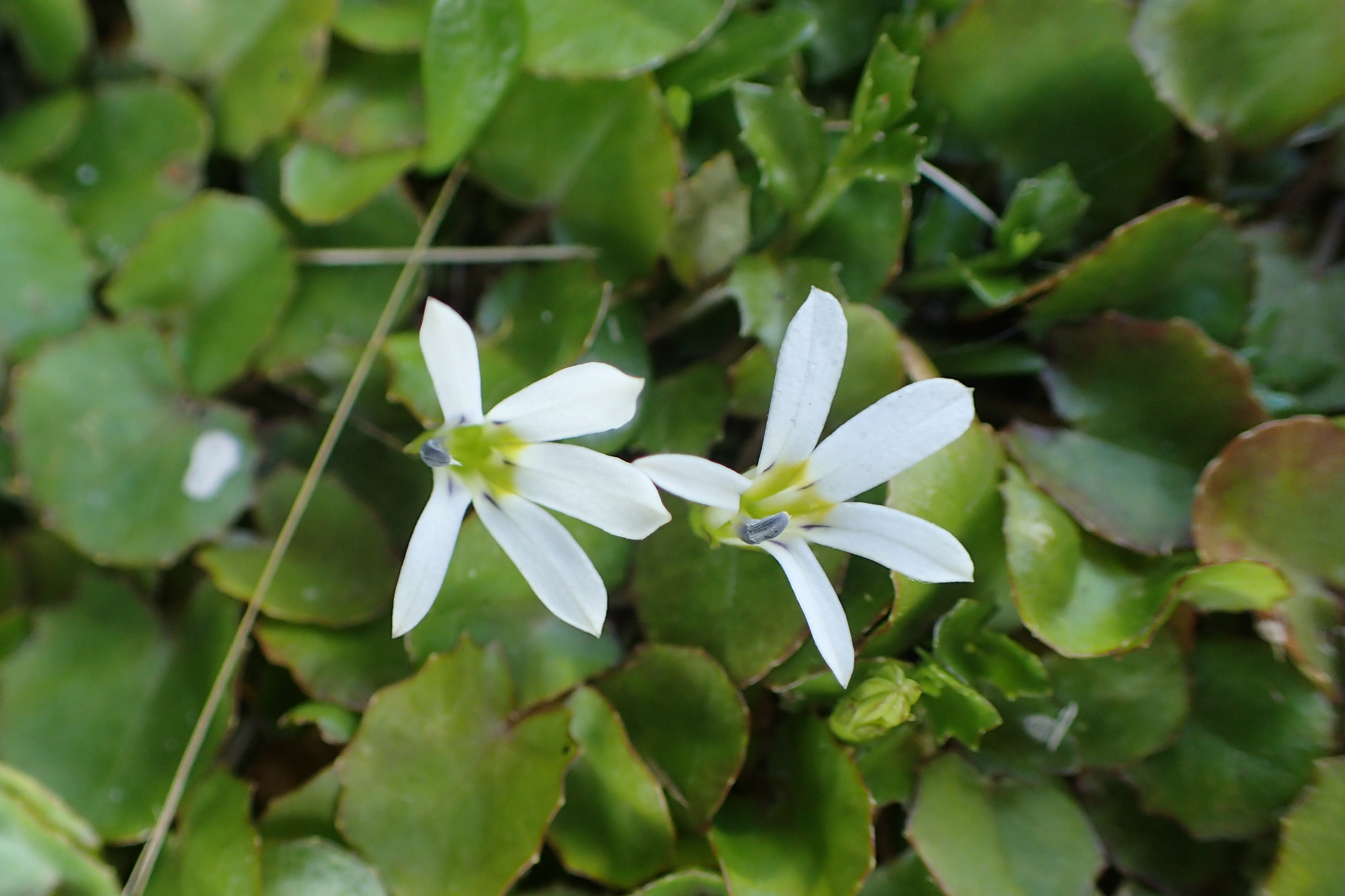

Scientific classification
- Kingdom: Plantae
- Clade: Tracheophytes
- Clade: Angiosperms
- Clade: Eudicots
- Clade: Asterids
- Order: Asterales
- Family: Campanulaceae
- Genus: Lobelia
- Species: L. angulata

Binomial name
- Lobelia angulata G.Forst. (1786)

Synonyms
- Pratia angulata (G.Forst.) Hook.f. (1844)

= Lobelia angulata =

Species of flowering plant

Lobelia angulata, previously known as Pratia angulata, and commonly known as pānakenake, or Lawn Lobelia is a small scrambling herbaceous plant native to New Zealand.

== Species description ==
Lobelia angulata is a creeping, wide-spreading, herbaceous plant that can grow in mats of up to 1 metre in diameter. It produces roots at the leaf nodes. The prostrate stems are green, with mottling that can be purplish, reddish or greenish in colour. The leaves grow alternately and are either sessile or shortly petiolate on the stems, and have prominent blunt teeth on the edges. The leaves have similar colouration to the stems, being green or with purplish mottling or edges, with the leaves usually being glabrous but occasionally with sparse, short, stiff hairs. The leaves are generally 4–12mm by 3–13mm in size, making them quite small. The flowers are prominent and eye-catching with five (occasionally four or six) white petals, with a configuration that makes the flower appear lopsided. The flowers are produced on short, slender pedicles. The interior of the flower is yellowish with the reproductive column being purplish at its tip, and the petals often having purple veins to varying extents. The flowers are generally 7–20mm in length. The flower has a short corolla tube of variable size, typically ranging from 7mm to 20mm. The prominent fruits are purplish-red when ripe, ovular or rounded in shape, but can sometimes be heart-shaped or more flattened in one direction. Fruit is crowned by calyx lobes, with a foamy, thick-walled flesh. Hollow locules inside the fruit contain the small seeds The seeds are orange-brown with a darker spot at the apex and hilum, and are ovular or slightly oblong in shape. The seed testa has a faint but widespread texture consisting of ridges and pits, with the seed being sticky and glabrous.

Lobelia angulata plants also differ in size depending on altitude, as those from higher altitudes are typically smaller in size in comparison to those from lower altitudes.

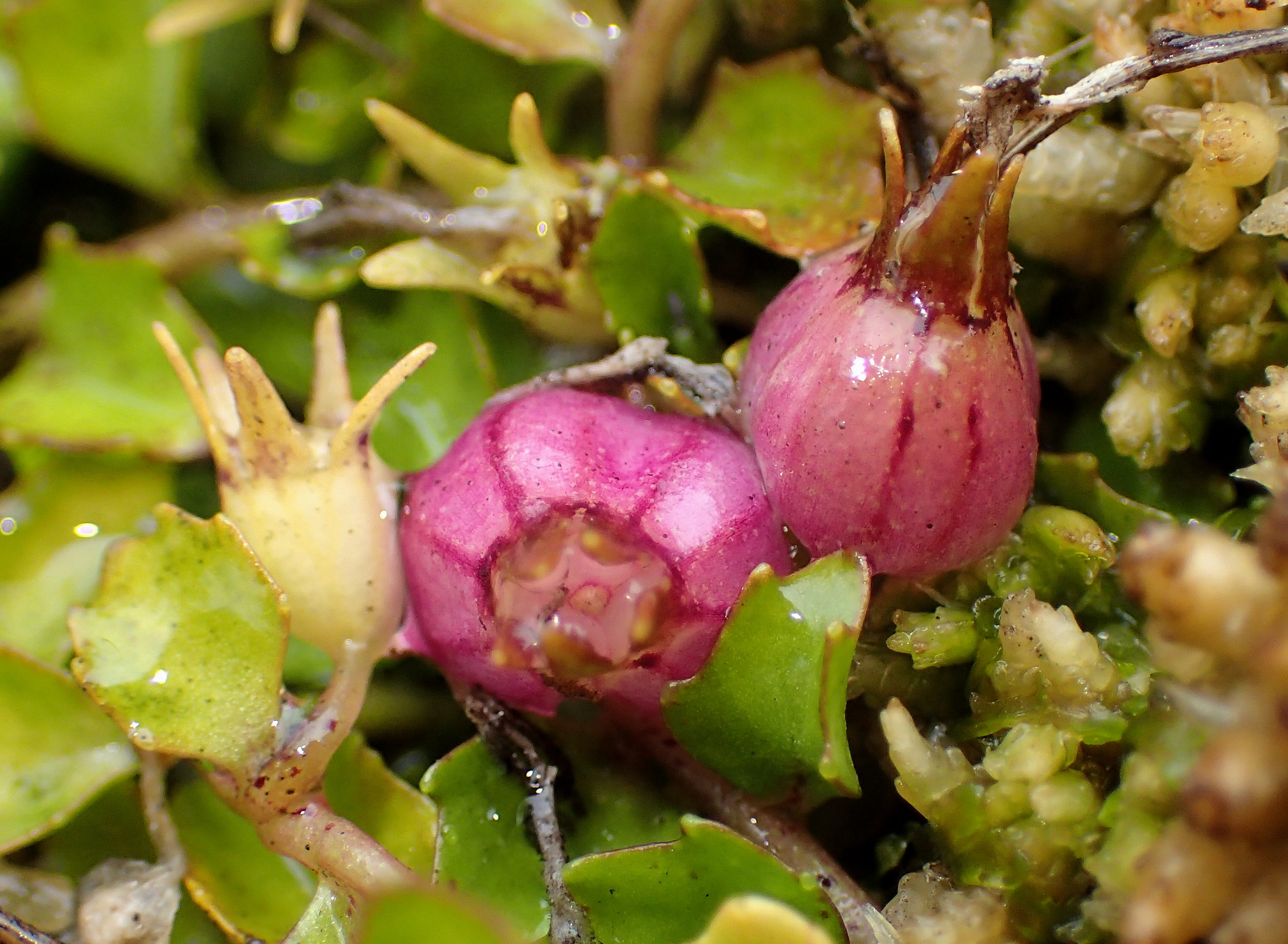
Fruits of Lobelia angulata at Boyle River, Canterbury.

== Distribution ==
Lobelia angulata is naturally endemic to New Zealand and some of its offshore islands.

It has also become an established exotic plant in the British Isles. It was first brought to the British Isles for cultivation in 1829 and has become well established in and around the Royal Botanic Garden in Edinburgh. Lobelia angulata has now become quite widespread in the British Isles, especially in areas of England and Scotland, with sightings increasing since the turn of the 21st century.

=== New Zealand range ===
Lobelia angulata is widespread and common in damp habitats throughout much of the North, South and Stewart Islands. It is easily the most common and widespread of the New Zealand native Lobelia species. It also occurs on some nearby islands such as Ulva Island off Stewart Island. Interestingly, it also occurs on the subantarctic Auckland Islands (namely Enderby Island) and Campbell Island.

=== Habitat preferences ===
Lobelia angulata grows in a variety of moist habitats from lowland to 1,300 metres above sea level in the low alpine zone. It can often be found in habitats such as stream banks, lakes edges, forest edges and tracks, open forest and other types of moist habitats that are well-lit. In alpine regions they may grow in similar moist habitats such as subalpine grasslands, herbfields, closely grazed sites and other non-shaded habitats. Lobelia angulata can tolerate temperatures to as low as –10 degrees Celsius. Lobelia angulata cannot thrive in environments that get too dry. It grows in well-lit sites as well as those with some or light shade.

== Ecology ==
=== Life cycle and phenology ===
Lobelia angulata has a long season for flowering and fruiting, with both flowers and ripe fruits often being seen on the plant at the same time. In New Zealand, flowering first commences in late spring around October and lasts until early autumn, typically March and April. The peak of flowering, however, occurs from November through to March. Fruiting typically occurs from late spring to early winter. The most fruiting occurs in autumn during April and May, but fruits are still consistently found throughout much of the winter and spring. Seeds excreted by Weta are known to germinate faster than those extracted from fruit pulp. Lobelia angulata is a perennial plant, and thus lives longer than one year or season, and also has a fast rate of growth. Since this plant roots at the leaf nodes, it could also propagate in new areas via stem fragments that wash away or are carried to new locations.

In the British Isles the flowering season is roughly reversed from that of its native New Zealand, with peak flowering occurring from July to September.

=== Predators, parasites, and diseases ===
Various insects have been recorded visiting and pollinating the flowers of Lobelia angulata. Dipterans known to visit its flowers include the Syrphid hoverfly Melangyna novaezelandiae and Tachinid flies such as Heteria plebeia, Gracilicera politiventris, Procissio cana and species in the genera Occisor and Protohystricia. Moths such as the Sod Webworm (Eudonia sabulosella) have also been recorded visiting the flowers. Various other small moths and native bees can also be seen visiting the flowers.

The fruits are fed on by various insects, such as Acridid grasshoppers and Weta. Wellington Tree Weta (Hemideina crassidens) feed on the fruits and excrete the seeds intact in their droppings. Other animals such as the Paradise Shelduck and other birds will also feed on the fruits.

The leaves of Lobelia angulata are also fed upon by various insects. Most notably is a currently undescribed species of Drosophilid fly in the genus Scaptomyza, which is known to be a leaf miner of L. angulata. The larvae of this fly form yellowish mines and a powdery white exudate on the leaves and pupate in older leaves. The alpine Acridid grasshoppers Sigaus australis, Paprides nitidus and Brachaspis nivalis are also known to feed on the leaves, as well as the flowers and fruits.

== Other information ==
Lobelia angulata is a gynodioecious plant, in this case meaning that some individual plants may be male, female or both. Some populations of this plant are known not to contain any females, only male and hermaphroditic individuals. Specimens studied at Hinewai Reserve, Banks Peninsula, and Harihari, Westland, were found to contain no females, whereas those from Kettlehole Bog, Cass, Canterbury did contain females within the population.

Lobelia angulata is known to hybridise with the closely related Lobelia perpusilla, with these hybrids producing viable seeds. In fact, the hybridisation of different species of New Zealand Lobelia is seemingly a major factor in their evolution. Lobelia angulata also has notable chromosome variation between populations, with different 'races' of plants having differing numbers of chromosomes. These 'races' are both very widespread and will sometimes overlap in distribution. However, some of these races most likely represent hybrid populations. The two main chromosome types are 2n = 70, 140.

Lobelia angulata is one of several New Zealand native plants that has been trialed as ground cover for vineyards. It was a reasonably promising species for this purpose, but other plant species were seen as more effective.

Lobelia angulata has become a popular plant in cultivation, especially due to its attractive whitish flowers and reddish fruits. It is typically grown in rock gardens and becomes a vigorous ground cover. This is the reason why L. angulata was initially brought to the United Kingdom (UK), before then spreading throughout many regions of the British Isles. It is easy to grow from cuttings, but can also be germinated from seed.

Māori people of the Tuhoe tribe in the Urewera district of the North Island were known to gather the tiny leaves of Lobelia angulata, cook them and eat them as greens.

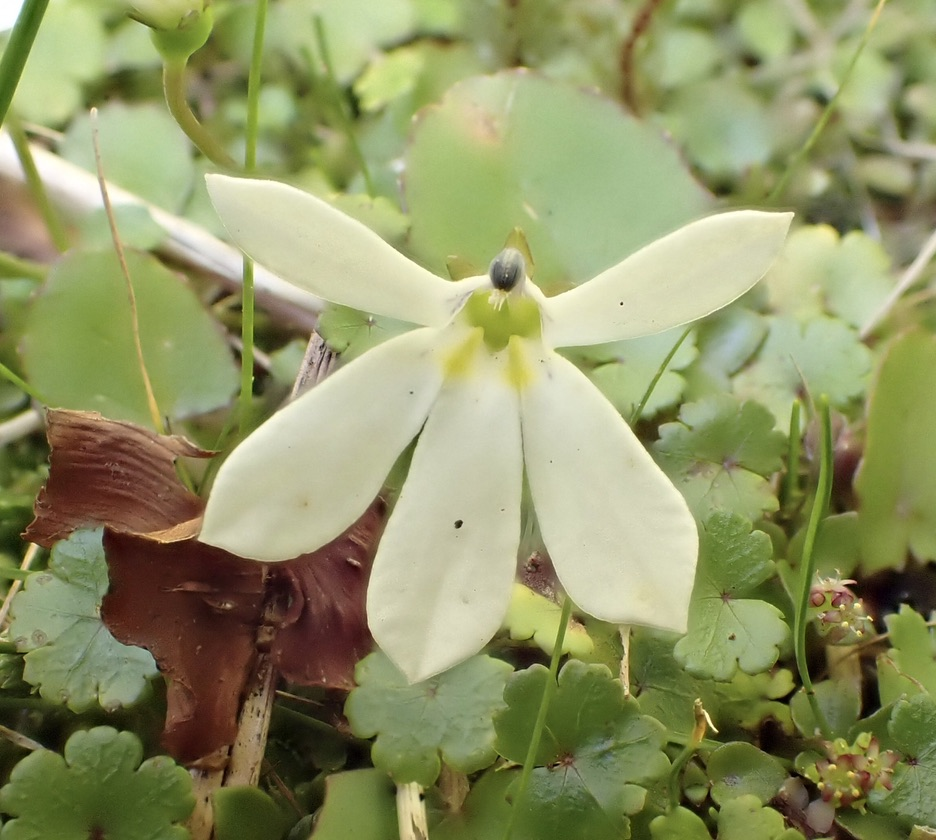
Flower
