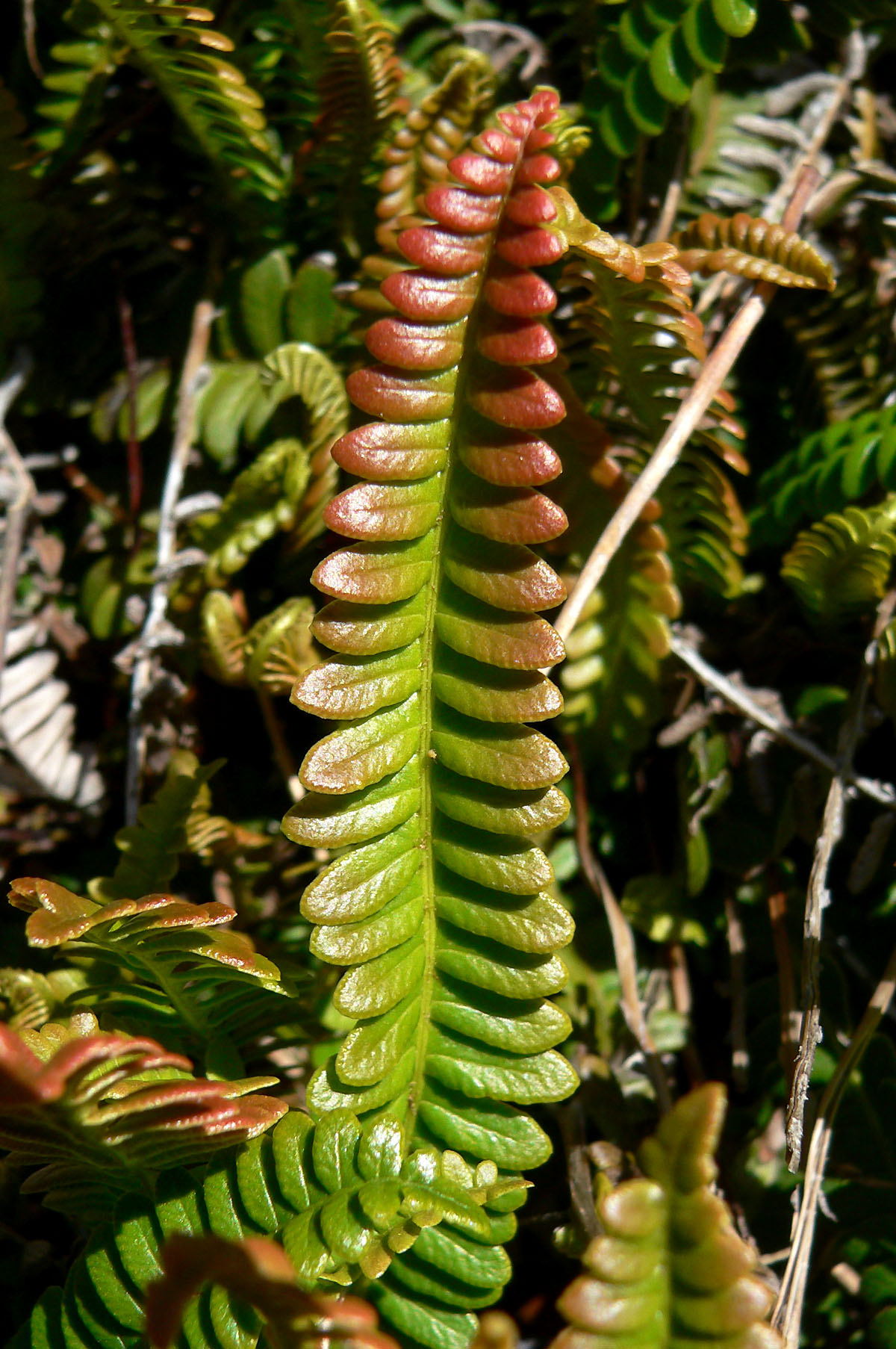

Scientific classification
- Kingdom: Plantae
- Clade: Tracheophytes
- Division: Polypodiophyta
- Class: Polypodiopsida
- Order: Polypodiales
- Suborder: Aspleniineae
- Family: Blechnaceae
- Genus: Austroblechnum
- Species: A. penna-marina

Binomial name
- Austroblechnum penna-marina (Poir.) Gasper & V.A.O.Dittrich

Synonyms
- Acrostichum polytrichoides Thouars; Blechnum alpinum (R.Br.) Mett.; Blechnum hillii C.Chr.; Blechnum parvifolium (Colenso) C.Chr.; Blechnum penna-marina (Poir.) Kuhn; Blechnum uliginosum (Phil.) C.Chr.; Lomaria alpina (R.Br.) Spreng.; Lomaria antarctica Carmich.; Lomaria distans Colenso; Lomaria linearis CoI.; Lomaria parvifolia Colenso; Lomaria penna-marina (Poir.) Trevis.; Lomaria polypodioides Desv.ex Gaudich.; Lomaria pumila Raoul; Lomaria trichomanoides Desv.; Lomaria uliginosa Phil.; Lonchitis penna-marina (Poir.) Farw.; Lonchitis-aspera penna-marina (Poir.) Farw.; Polypodium penna-marina Poir.; Spicanta penna-marina (Poir.) Kuntze; Spicanta pumila (Raoul) Kuntze; Stegania alpina R.Br.; Struthiopteris distans (Colenso) Ching; Struthiopteris penna-marina (Poir.) Maxon & Morton

= Austroblechnum penna-marina =

Species of plant

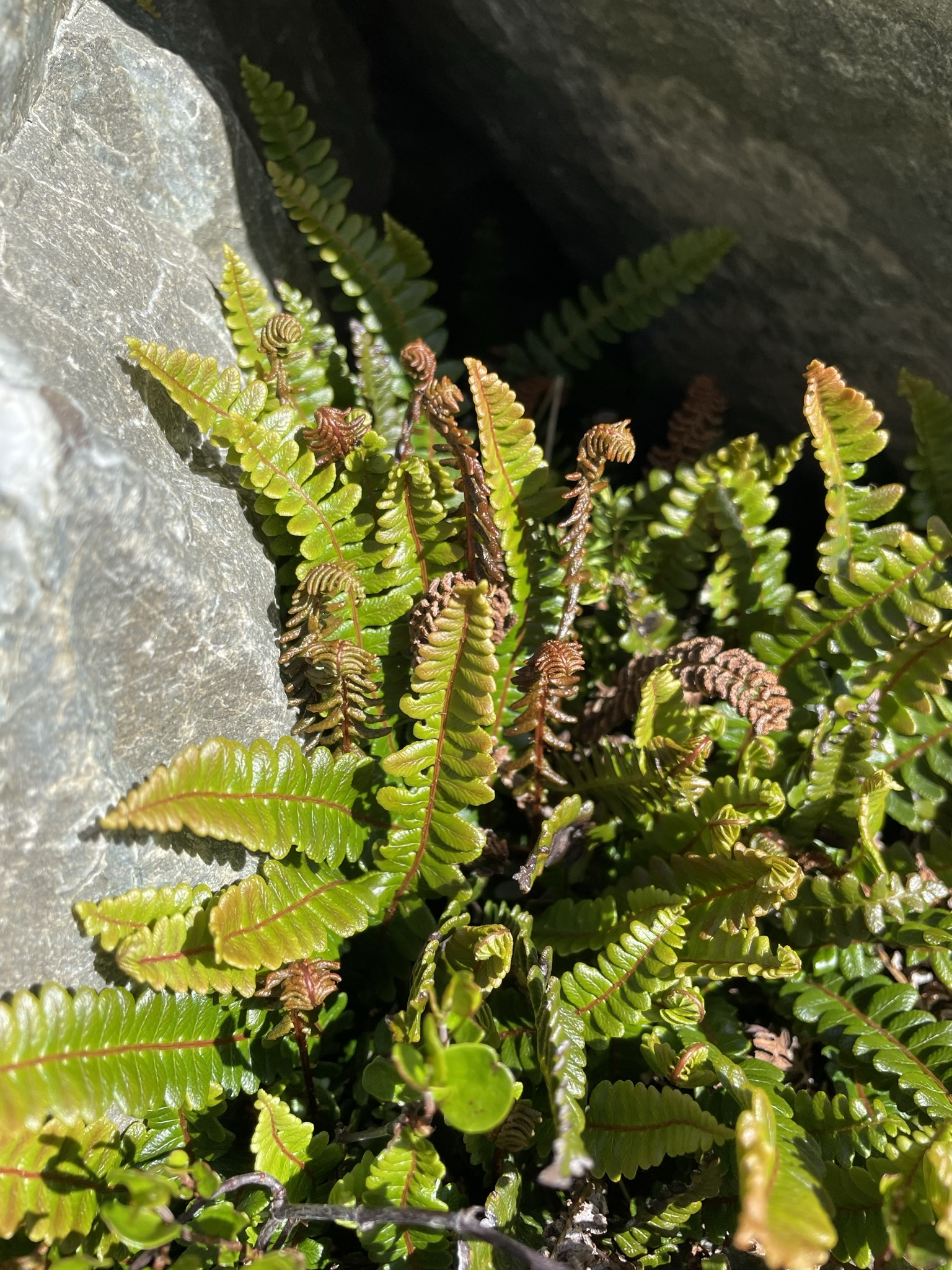
Little Hard Fern near Mount Cook, New Zealand, November 2022

Austroblechnum penna-marina, synonym Blechnum penna-marina, known as Antarctic hard-fern, Little Hard Fern, Alpine Hard Fern, alpine water fern and pinque (Chilean Spanish), is a species of fern in the family Blechnaceae. It is a widely distributed fern species in the southern hemisphere, with a natural range including New Zealand, Australia, and South America.

It has wiry rhizomes and exhibits strong dimorphism in its fronds. The sterile fronds are prostrate or semi-erect, growing up to 400 mm in length, while the fertile fronds are longer and held erect. The sterile fronds have a yellow-brown stem, while the fertile fronds have a purplish-black stipe. Both types of fronds have pinnatisect laminae with free veins. The sterile fronds have 12–44 pairs of triangular or oblong pinnae, while the fertile fronds have 10–36 pairs of linear to narrowly oblong pinnae, which are replaced by tiny sterile flanges at the base.

This fern prefers coastal to alpine environments, including open forests, grasslands, subalpine scrub, alpine herb fields, creek beds, river terraces, and rocky herb fields. It can be found from sea level up to 1900 meters above sea level. The preferred temperature range for its productivity is 6 to 11 degrees Celsius. It faces predation from endemic alpine grasshoppers such as Brachaspis nivalis, Paprides nitidus, and Sigaus australis.

== Taxonomy ==
French botanist Jean Louis Marie Poiret first described this species as Polypodium penna-marina in 1804 in “Encyclopédie Méthodique Botanique”, and it was later shifted to Blechnum penna-marina by German botanist Friedrich Adalbert Maximilian Kuhn in 1868. In 2016 it was placed in the new genus Austroblechnum, as Austroblechnum penna-marina, although this change has not been widely used.

The species name "penna-marina" refers to its feather-like appearance and its coastal habitat.

== Description ==
=== Appearance ===
Blechnum penna-marina features a wiry rhizome, which gives rise to long creeping and sparing branches. The fronds of this species exhibit strong dimorphism, with sterile fronds growing up to 400 mm when semi-erect in manner, while fertile fronds are longer and held erect, often reaching twice the length of the sterile fronds. Sterile fronds have a yellow-brown stem, whereas fertile fronds have a purplish-black stipe. The laminae of both sterile and fertile fronds are pinnatisect, linear to narrowly elliptic, tapering to a pinnatifid apex, and coriaceous, with free veins. The sterile fronds bear 12–44 pairs of triangular or oblong pinnae, while the fertile fronds have 10–36 pairs of linear to narrowly oblong pinnae, which are replaced by tiny sterile flanges at the base of the lamina.

=== Size ===
The varying sizes of the fronds contribute to the distinct appearance of Blechnum penna-marina, with the sterile fronds being shorter and the fertile fronds being taller and more upright. The size difference between the two types of fronds is an important characteristic to differentiate this species and adds to its overall aesthetic appeal.

The sterile fronds of this species typically grow to a length of 15–400 mm in a prostrate or semi-erect manner. Fertile fronds are longer and held erect, often reaching up to twice the length of the sterile fronds.

== Distribution ==
The species is widely distributed throughout the global south, including New Zealand, Australia, and South America. It is native to Marion Island, a subantarctic island halfway between Africa and Antarctica.

Within New Zealand, this fern species can be found throughout the country, spanning from the North Island to the South Island, including the Chatham, Stewart, Auckland, Campbell, and Antipodes Islands. It exhibits a broad altitudinal range, from sea level up to 1900 meters above sea level. In the North Island, Blechnum penna-marina is found in the lowlands to alpine regions, extending from Hamilton and East Cape to south Wellington. Similarly, in the South Island and Stewart Island, it occurs in the lowland to alpine areas. Notably, it has been observed growing at high elevations of up to 1900 meters above sea level in the Spenser Mountains, Nelson. The wide geographic distribution of Blechnum penna-marina highlights its adaptability to diverse habitats and climates across the southern hemisphere.

== Interactions ==
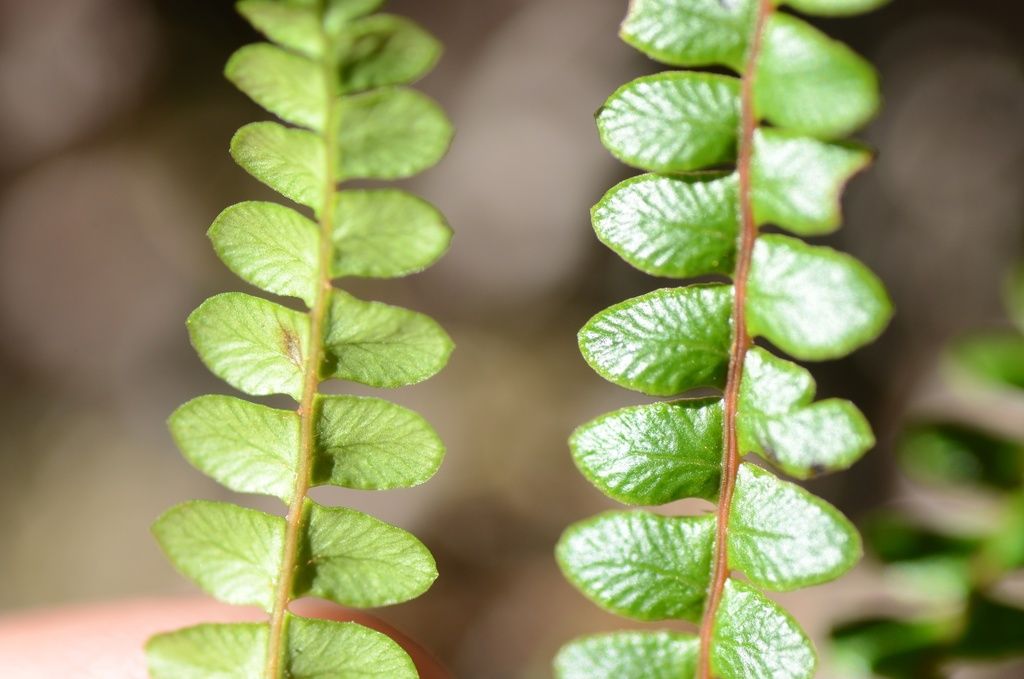
Pinnae of Blechnum penna-marina

There are few identified enemies of Blechnum penna-marina. Blechnum penna-marina is subject to herbivory by several endemic grasshopper species in New Zealand. The grasshoppers Brachaspis nivalis, Paprides nitidus, and Sigaus australis are known to feed on the pinnae of Blechnum penna-marina. These grasshoppers inhabit areas with vegetation covering the ground and can be found in alpine environments where Little Hard Fern grows well. While these grasshoppers are considered endemic to New Zealand, their presence indicates a potential interaction between the fern and native herbivores in other ecosystems. The impact of these grasshoppers on the population dynamics and growth of Blechnum penna-marina warrants further investigation, as it may play a role in shaping the fern's distribution and abundance in its natural habitat.

No fungal parasites or diseases have been recorded for this species as of March 30, 2023.

== Gallery ==
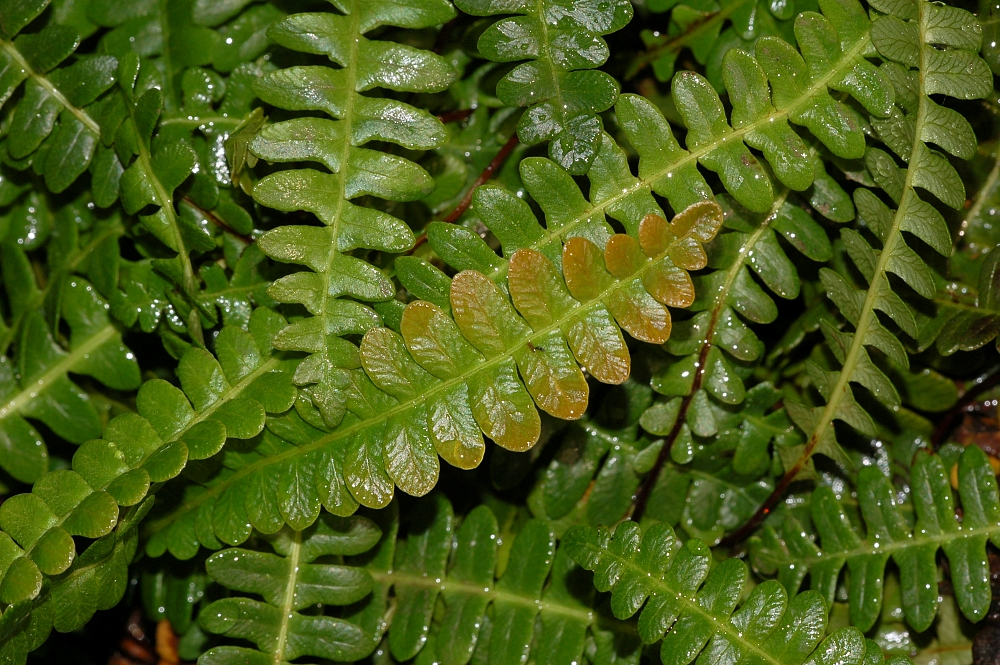

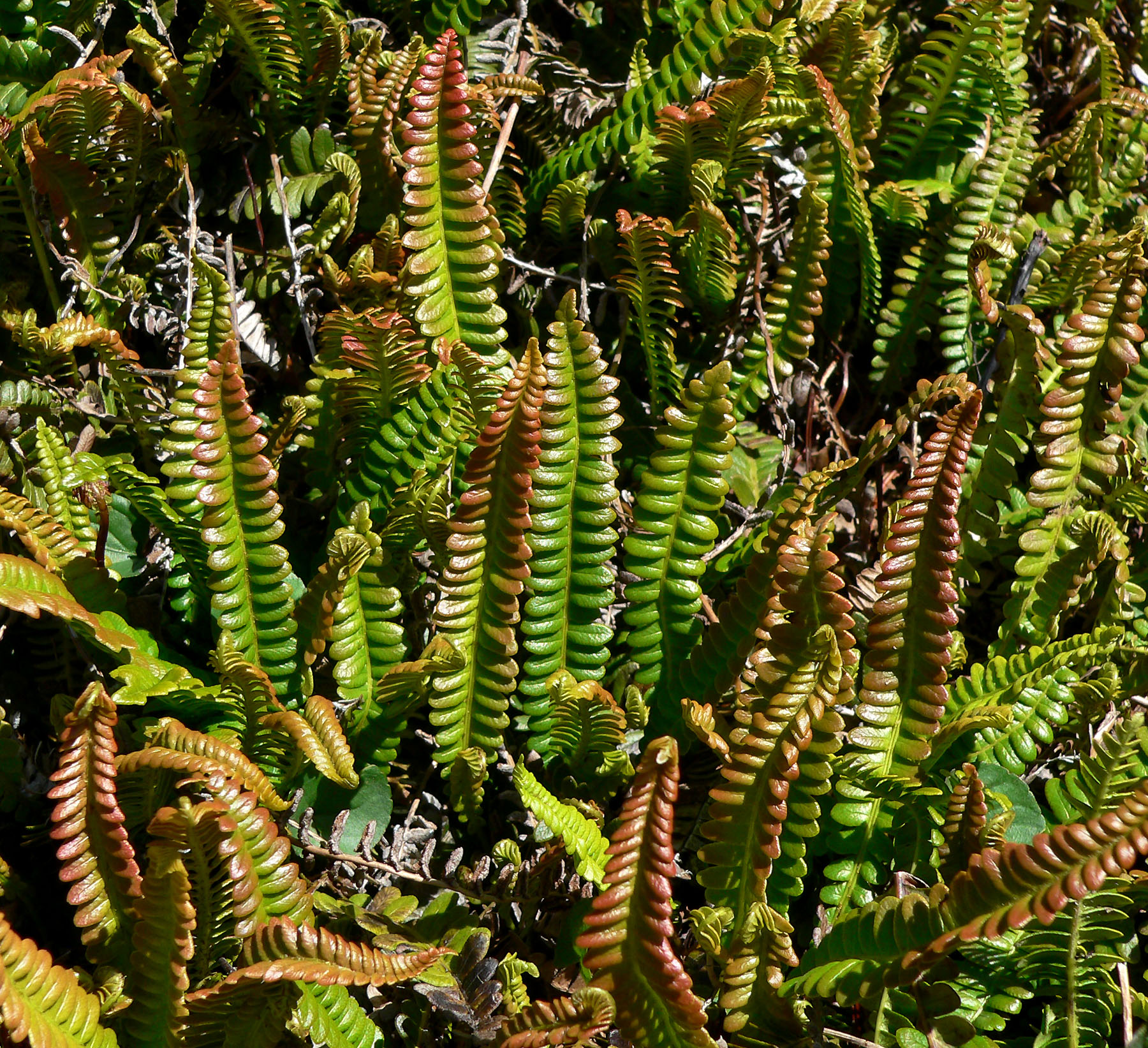

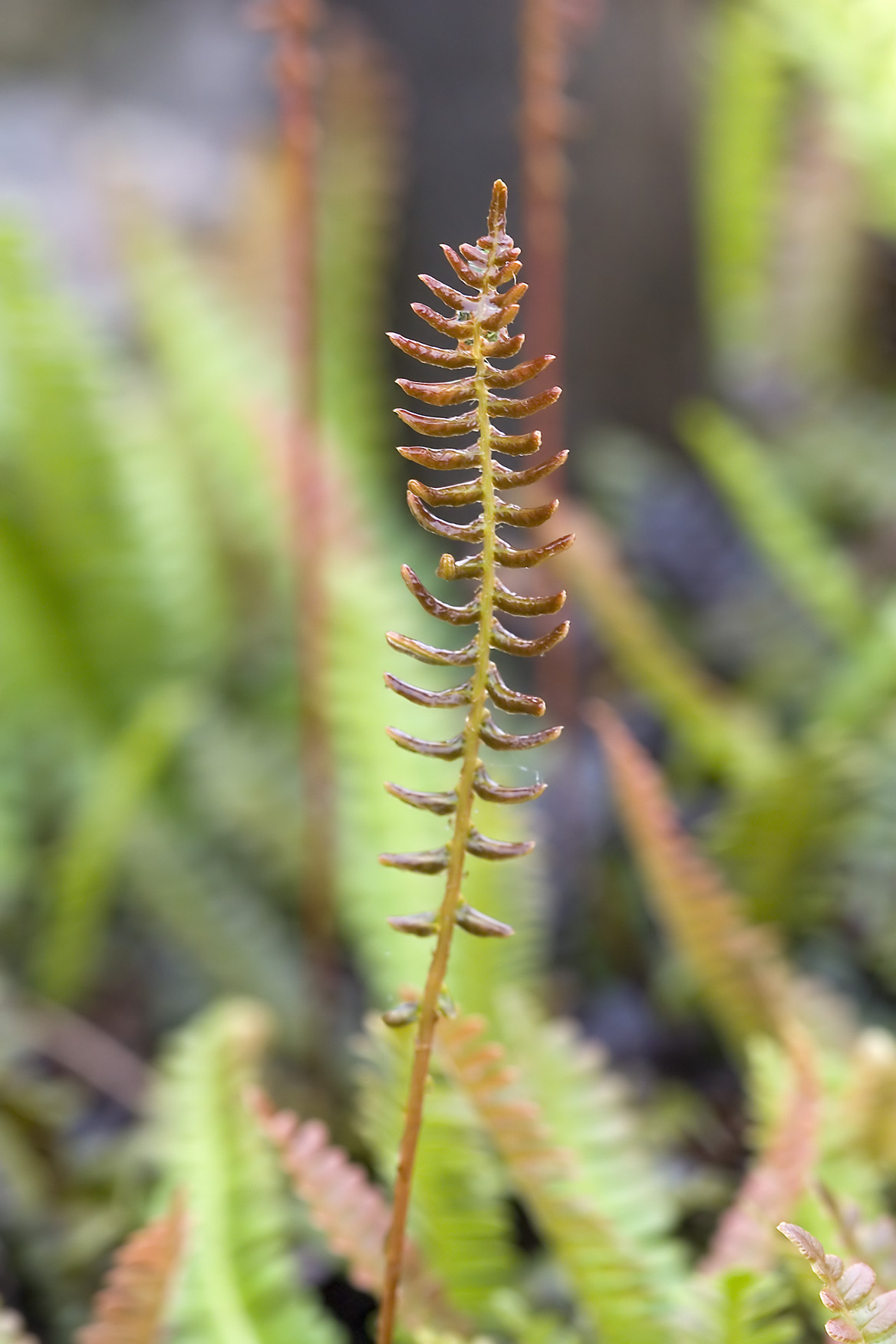

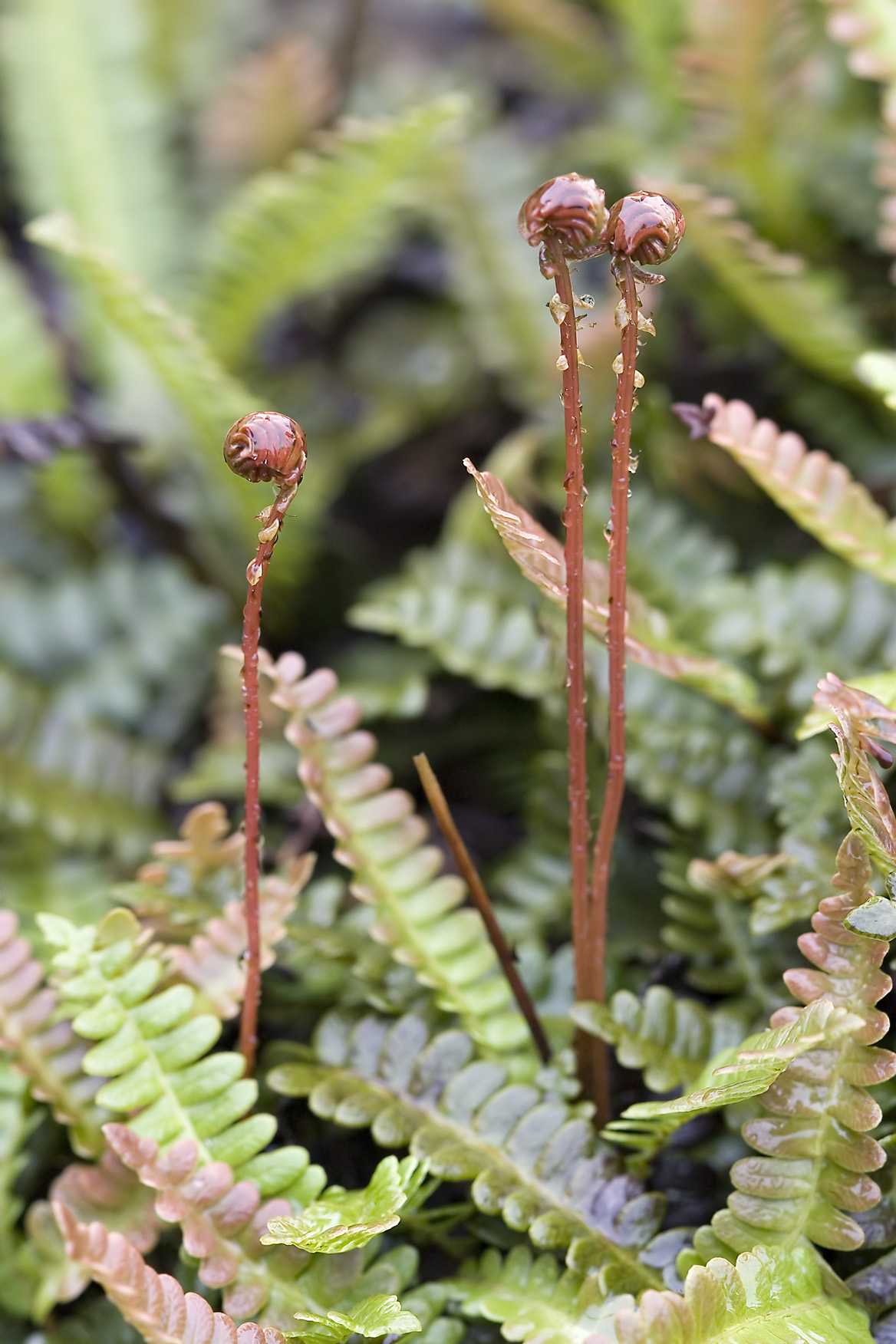

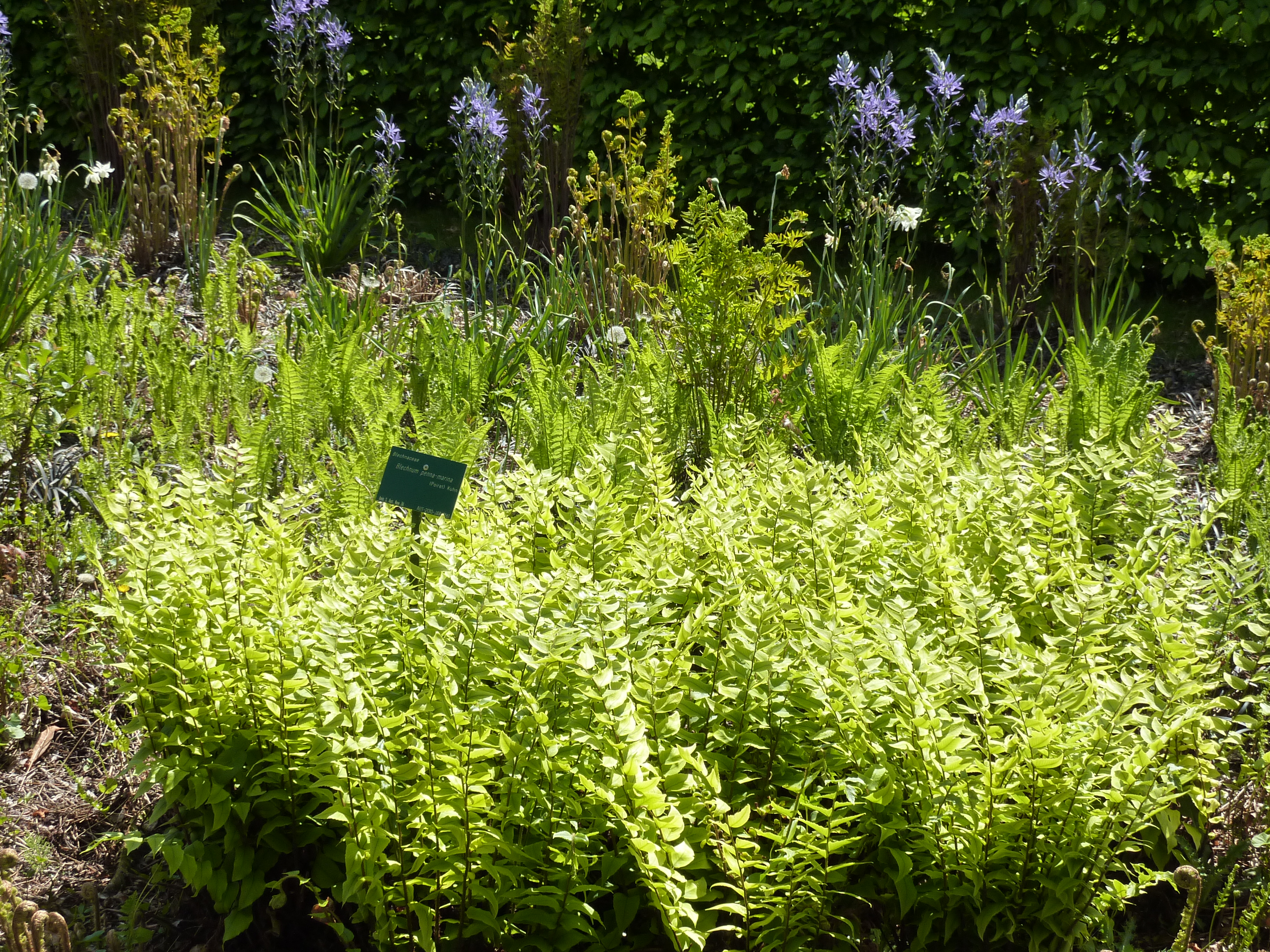

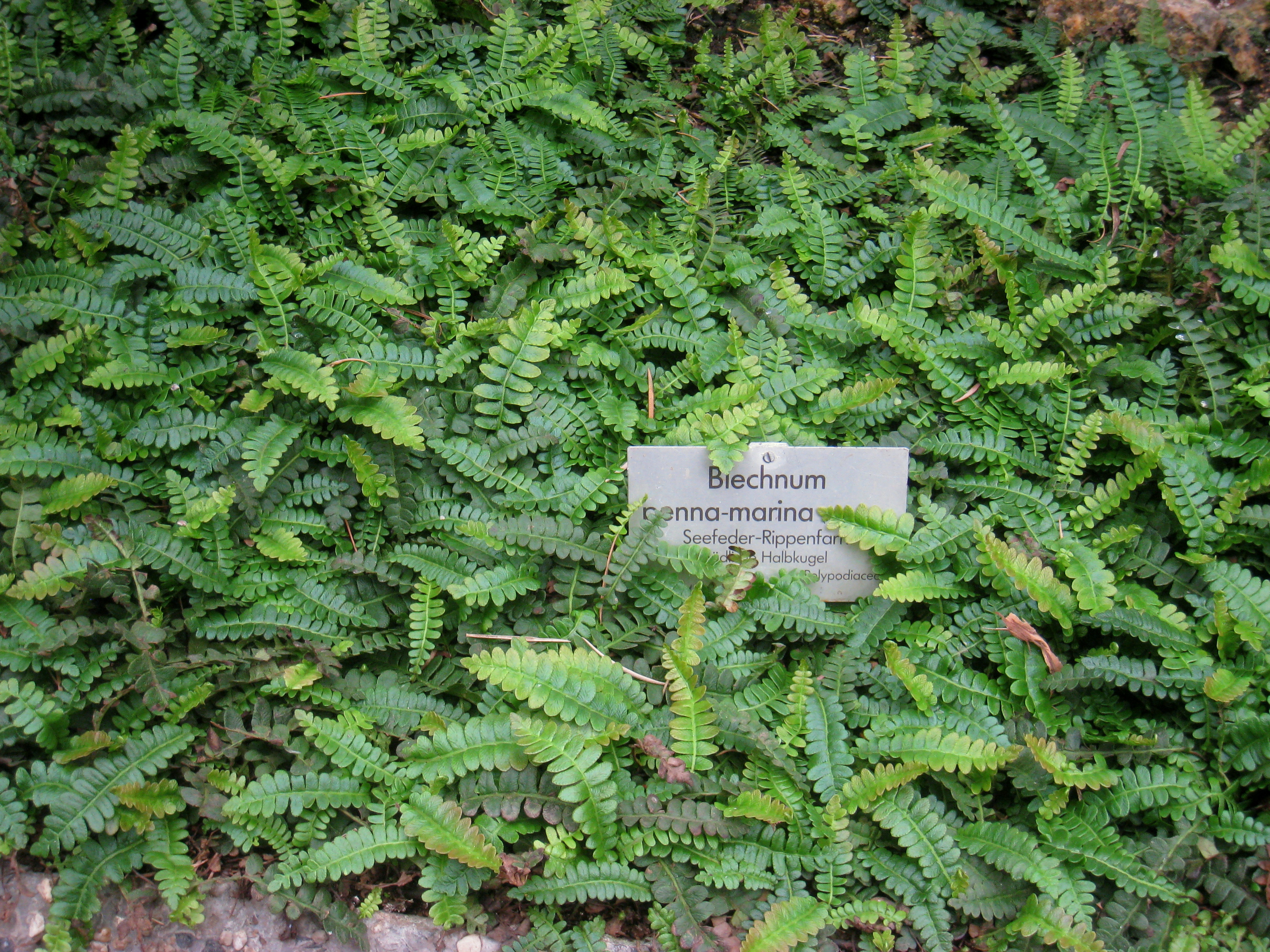

== See also ==
- Blechnum family of Little Hard Fern
- Fernside, New Zealand town
