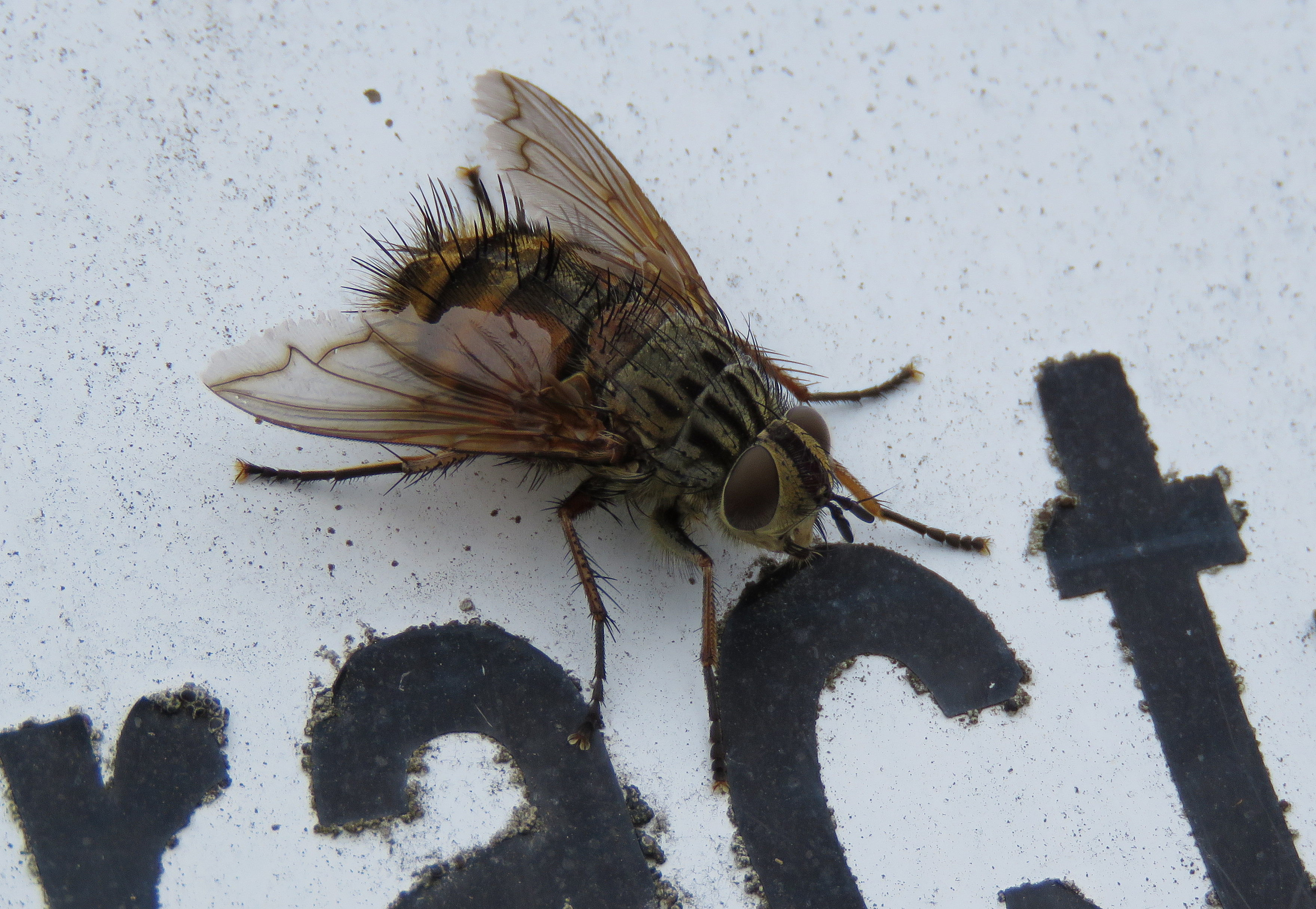
- Protohystricia sp.

Scientific classification
- Kingdom: Animalia
- Phylum: Arthropoda
- Class: Insecta
- Order: Diptera
- Family: Tachinidae
- Subfamily: Tachininae
- Tribe: Protohystriciini

= Protohystriciini =

Tribe of flies

Protohystriciini is a tribe of bristle flies in the family of Tachinidae.

They are found in New Zealand.

== Genera ==
- Protohystricia Malloch, 1929
