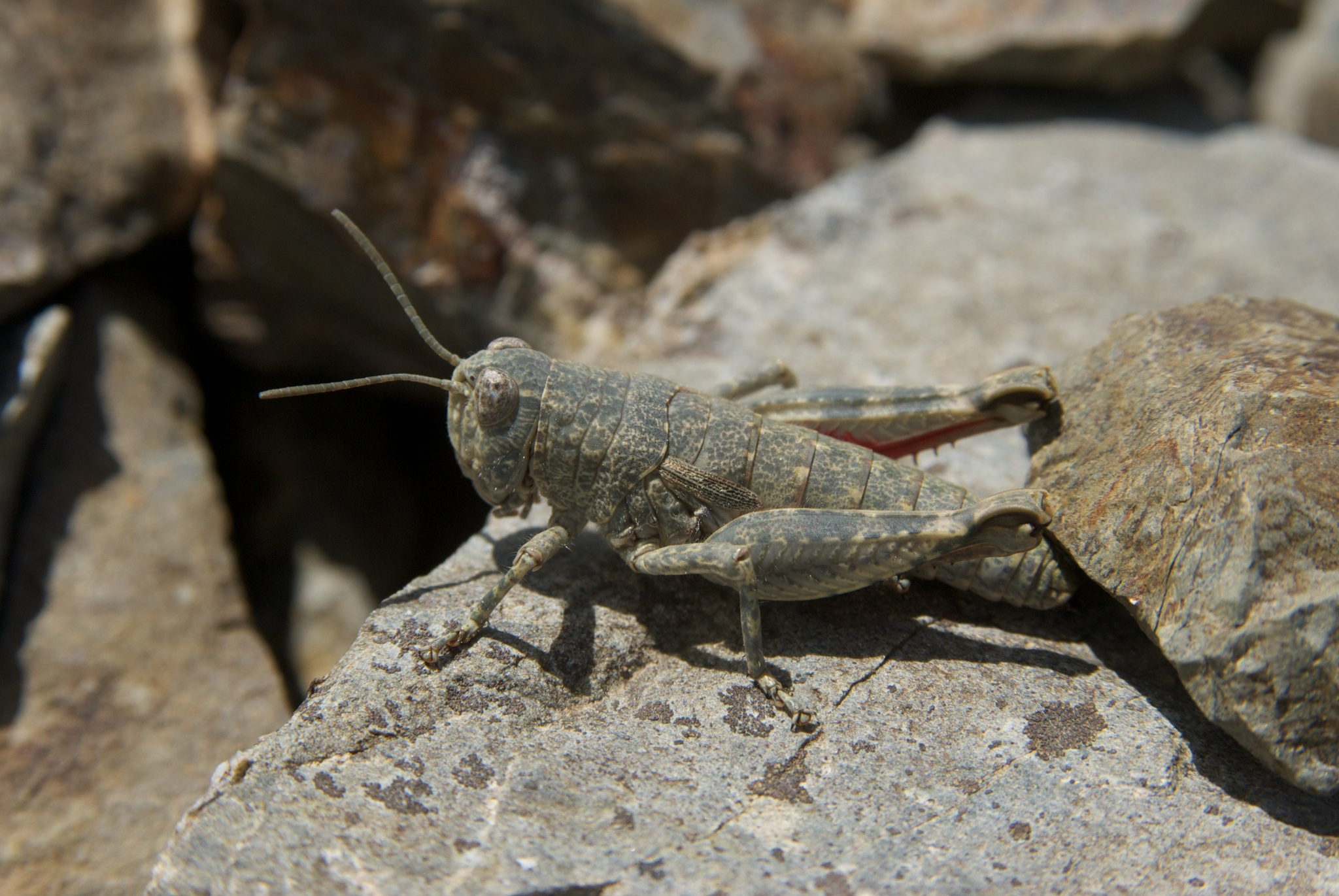

Conservation status
- Not Threatened (NZ TCS)

Scientific classification
- Kingdom: Animalia
- Phylum: Arthropoda
- Clade: Pancrustacea
- Class: Insecta
- Order: Orthoptera
- Suborder: Caelifera
- Family: Acrididae
- Genus: Sigaus
- Species: S. nivalis

Binomial name
- Sigaus nivalis Hutton, 1898

Synonyms
- Pezotettix nivalis (Hutton, 1897); Pezotettix petricola (Hutton, 1897); Pezotettix terrestris (Hutton 1897); Brachaspis petricolus (Hutton 1898); Brachaspis terristris (Hutton 1898); Brachaspis nivalis (Hutton 1898)

= Sigaus nivalis =

Species of insect

Sigaus nivalis, is an alpine short-horned grasshopper, endemic to the South Island of New Zealand. Sigaus nivalis is brachypterous and flightless, therefore they travel by hopping. They bask during the day so need open habitat.

== Taxonomy/history ==
'Sigaus' means silent and 'nivalis' means of the snow, so the name translates as the Quiet snow grasshopper. The species was first reported and described by Captain Frederick Wollaston Hutton from the Mount Cook area and Marlborough in 1897, but was put in the genus Pezotettix with some synonyms at that time. In 1898, Hutton proposed a new genus "Brachaspis" (from its short and broad sternal shield) and put in B. nivalis. In 1967, Bigelow revised Brachaspis and redefined three species. This group is monophyletic, nested within the New Zealand alpine grasshopper clade. In 2023 morphological and genetic data was used to group all 13 New Zealand endemic alpine grasshoppers into a single genus (Sigaus).

Sigaus nivalis includes populations from Canterbury and Kaikoura and is morphologically distinguished from the other species (Sigaus collinus & Sigaus robustus). Although hybridization between S. nivalis and S. collinus is suggested by ITS DNA sequence data in Mount Lyford where these species are sympatric, they are still considered different phylogenetic species on the basis of morphology, mtDNA (COI) sequence and geographical distribution. Furthermore, the genetic sequence data (COI & ITS) suggests that B. nivalis comprises northern and southern subgroups, that meet at the Rangitata River in Canterbury. Both mtDNA and nuclear markers of southern S. nivalis and S. robustus are very similar with evidence of hybridization between these two species.

=== Type information ===
- Pezotettix nivalis; unspecified primary type of species Brachaspis nivalis (Hutton, 1898). Hutton, F.W. (1897). The Grasshoppers and Locusts of New Zealand and the Kermadec Islands. Proceedings and Transactions of the New Zealand Institute 30: 135–150.
- Locality: New Zealand, New Zealand South I: Canterbury, Mt. Cook region; 43°35′41″S 170°08′32″E.
- Type specimen: Female; G. E. Mannering; the type is deposited in the Canterbury Museum, Christchurch.

== Habitat and distribution ==
Sigaus nivalis is common in rocky montane areas with scattered plants (unlike S. collinus which are mostly found in tussock grass in the Nelson region). The elevational range of S. nivalis is between 600 and 2000 metres above mean sea level. The distribution of S. nivalis is widespread at high elevation in South Island New Zealand from Marlborough, Canterbury and north Otago.

== Morphology ==
Sigaus nivalis is polymorphic and has cryptic coloration resembling the surrounding rocky habitat. The color morphs can be either grey or grey mottled brown. Individuals with scarlet, purple or indigo-black flash-display of the hind legs have been collected at various sites (unlike the reddish brown hind legs in S. collinus). Males are usually smaller than females. The known body length of males range between 15–24 mm, and the females between 16–40 mm. The length of the hind femur of males are 8.5-12.5 mm, and the females are 11.5–17 mm. Generally, the body size of S. nivalis is smaller than S. robustus. Body size of adult S. nivalis increases with elevation, and latitude the largest individuals are found above 1200m asl and the smallest on stream edges at low elevation.

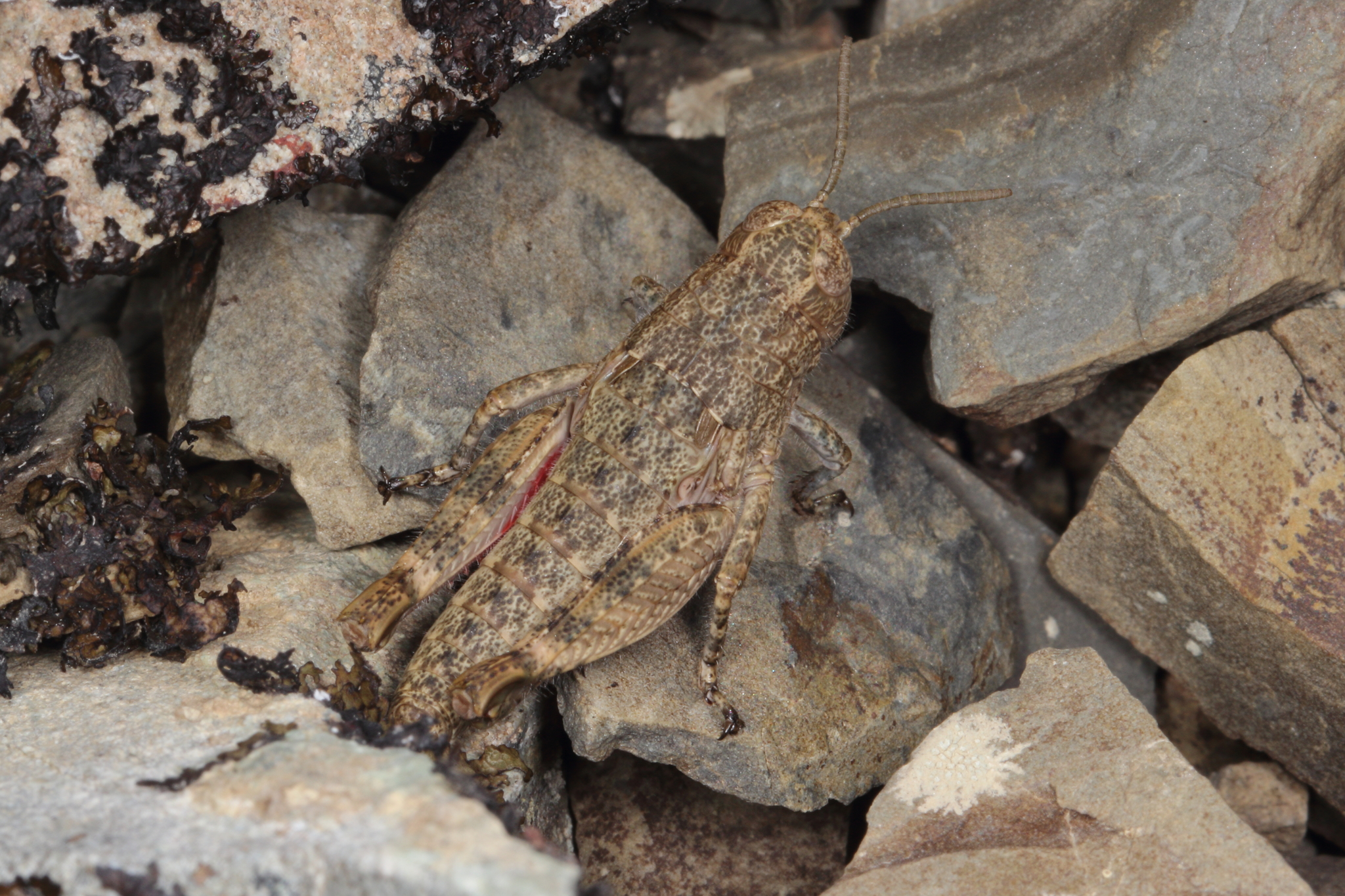
Sigaus nivalis with grey mottled brown body color and scarlet flash-display of the hind legs.

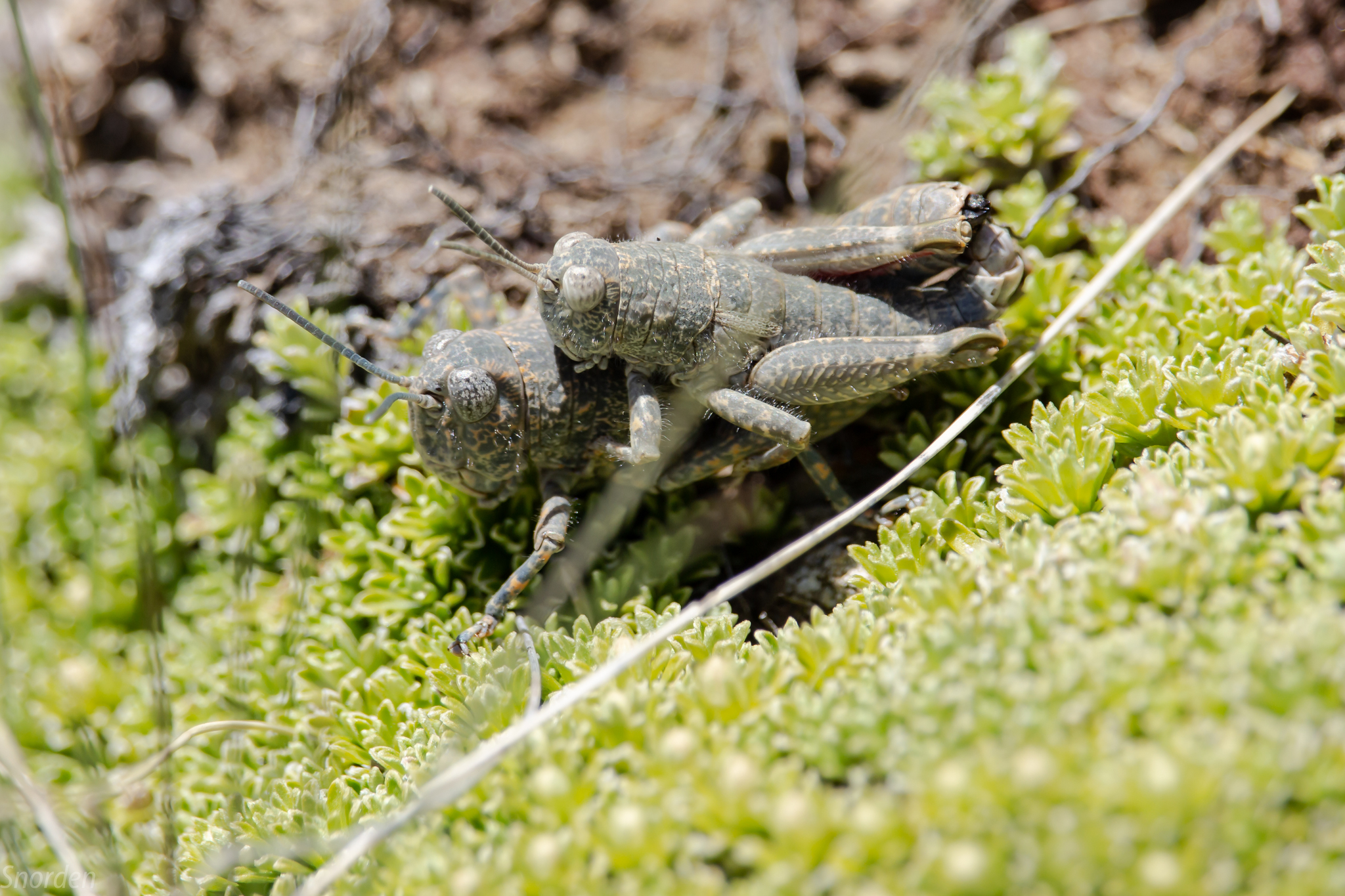
A mating pair of S. nivalis showing mounting behavior with the smaller male on top.

== Diet ==
Sigaus nivalis shows multiple and opportunistic feeding behavior. It is a herbivore and prefers to eat the floral parts of plants. It was observed to feed on plants such as Hebe spp., Epilobium spp., Celmisia spp., Poa spp., Wahlenbergia albomarginata, Anisotome aromatica, Chionochloa pallens, Coprosma pumila, Pittosporum crassicaule, ferns such as Austroblechnum penna-marina, mosses such as Polytrichum juniperinum and unidentified lichens. In addition, ingestion of arthropods was found in adult B. nivalis, but it may be upon opportune contact.

== Life history ==
Males undergo six instars and females undergo seven instars to become adults. First and second instars are suggested to be abundant during January and February. The mating activity of B. nivalis extends throughout the life span of adults. The maximum longevity of male adults are 21.8 months, and the for females are 26.1 months.

== Reproduction ==
Sigaus nivalis shows multiple mating with a different non-bonded mate on each occasion. When a male tries to mate, it often aggressively mounts a resisting female. The male firmly grabs the female to prevent detachment by sudden disturbance. Mating pairs have been observed from spring to autumn (September - April). Gravid females were also observed from September to May except April, and number were highest in January and February. Females show multiple oviposition. Each egg pod may contain 20-30 eggs and first instars are observed in late December or early January.

== Conservation ==
Sigaus nivalis was assessed to be not threatened (NT) level of NZTCS in 2022. This status has not changed from prior assessments in 2014 and 2010. However, if further population genetic research suggests that the small, low-elevation forms are distinct from their montane relatives, the conservation status of the low-elevation forms has to be considered threatened by flooding events, land development, weed invasion and introduced predators. The population abundance of S. nivalis correlates with soil temperature. Therefore, the increase in mean temperature due to global warming may cause S. nivalis to lose suitable habitat in the future.
