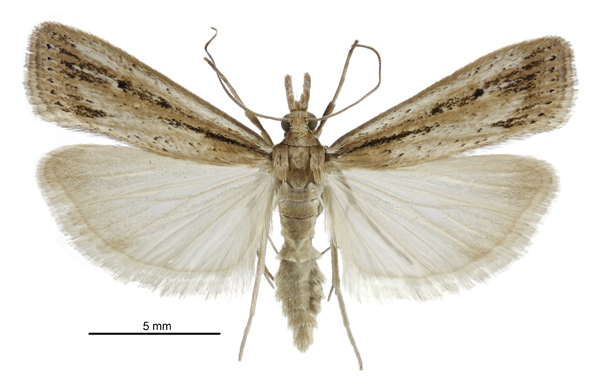
- Male

Scientific classification
- Kingdom: Animalia
- Phylum: Arthropoda
- Class: Insecta
- Order: Lepidoptera
- Family: Crambidae
- Genus: Eudonia
- Species: E. sabulosella

Binomial name
- Eudonia sabulosella (Walker, 1863)

Synonyms
- Crambus sabulosellus Walker, 1863; Crambus sabulosella (Walker, 1863); Scoparia sabulosella (Walker, 1863); Witlesia sabulosella (Walker, 1863)

= Eudonia sabulosella =

Species of moth endemic to New Zealand

Eudonia sabulosella is a species of moth in the family Crambidae. This species is endemic to New Zealand and is regarded as being common. The larvae of this species are known to damage pasture in New Zealand.

== Taxonomy ==
This species was originally described by Francis Walker in 1863 using a female specimen collected by Dr. A. Sinclair in Auckland and named Crambus sabulosellus. In 1884 Edward Meyrick discussed the species, giving a more detailed description, and placing it within the genus Scoparia while also changing the ending of the species name from the masculine -us to the feminine -a. George Hudson discussed and illustrated this species in his 1928 publication The Butterflies and Moths of New Zealand, also using the name Scoparia sabulosella. In 1988 John S. Dugdale placed the species in the genus Eudonia.

== Description ==
Walker described the species as follows:

Female. Cinereous fawn-colour. Labial palpi a little longer than the breadth of the head. Abdomen extending a little beyond the hind wings. Fore wings narrow; discal point and marginal points black; exterior border almost straight, slightly oblique. Hind wings pale cinereous. Length of the body 4 1/2 lines; of the wings 10 lines.

This species is variable, with some specimens being much darker than others. Despite this variation, E. sabulosella can be distinguished from similar species as it always has a pale ochreous ground colour to the forewings, along with two distinct blackish dots.

== Distribution ==
This species is endemic to New Zealand. It is generally distributed throughout New Zealand and can also be found on the Chatham Islands, Stewart Island as well as in the Auckland Islands.

== Food resources ==
=== Caterpillar hosts ===
The larvae of this species feed on lichens, bryophytes and grasses.

=== Adult diet ===
The adult moths have been recorded as visiting and likely feeding from the flowers of Corokia cotoneaster, Dracophyllum acerosum, Helichrysum intermedium, Lobelia angulata, Olearia virgata, Pimelea sericeovillosa.

=== Adult pollination ===
The adult moths pollinate Olearia virgata, Helichrysum selago, Praria angulata, Corokia cotoneaster, Dracophyllum acerosum and Pimelea sericeo-villosa.

== Occurrence ==
Adults of E. sabulosella are normally present during December and January.

== Human interactions ==
This species is regarded as being an economically damaging pest. The larvae of E. sabulosella can cause considerable damage to pasture.
