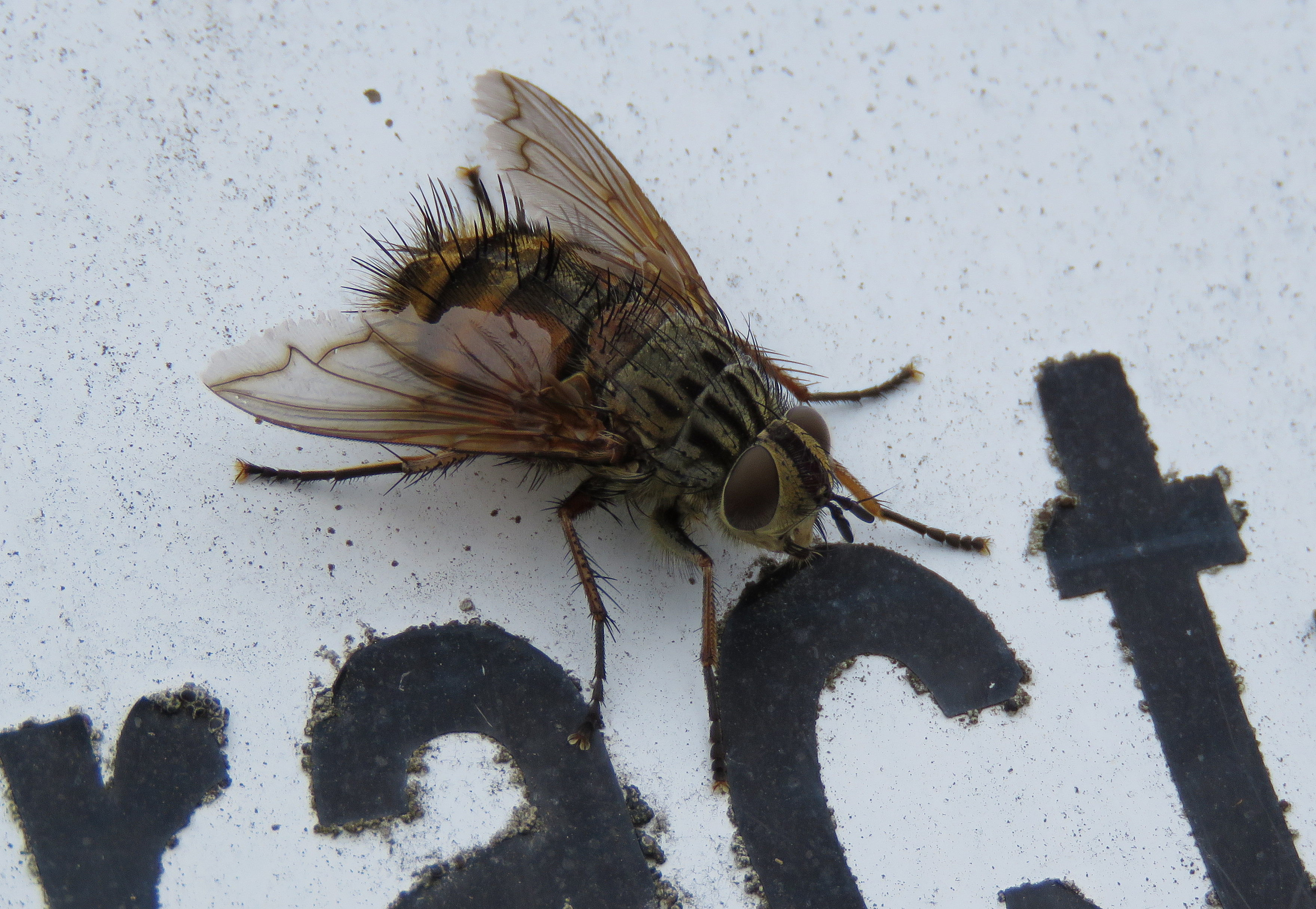
- Unidentified Protohystricia fly resting on information sign at Hinewai Reserve

Scientific classification
- Kingdom: Animalia
- Phylum: Arthropoda
- Class: Insecta
- Order: Diptera
- Family: Tachinidae
- Subfamily: Tachininae
- Tribe: Protohystriciini
- Genus: Protohystricia; Malloch, 1929

Type species
- Hystricia pachyprocta Nowicki, 1875

Synonyms
- Hexamera Brauer & von Berganstamm, 1889; Homohexamera Townsend, 1934

= Protohystricia =

Genus of flies

Protohystricia is a genus of flies in the family Tachinidae. Their larvae are deposited next to the burrows of porina moth caterpillars, which they will locate and parasitise.

== Species ==
- Protohystricia alcis (Walker, 1849)
- Protohystricia gourlayi (Tonnoir, 1935)
- Protohystricia huttoni Malloch, 1930
- Protohystricia orientalis (Schiner, 1868)

== Distribution ==
New Zealand.
