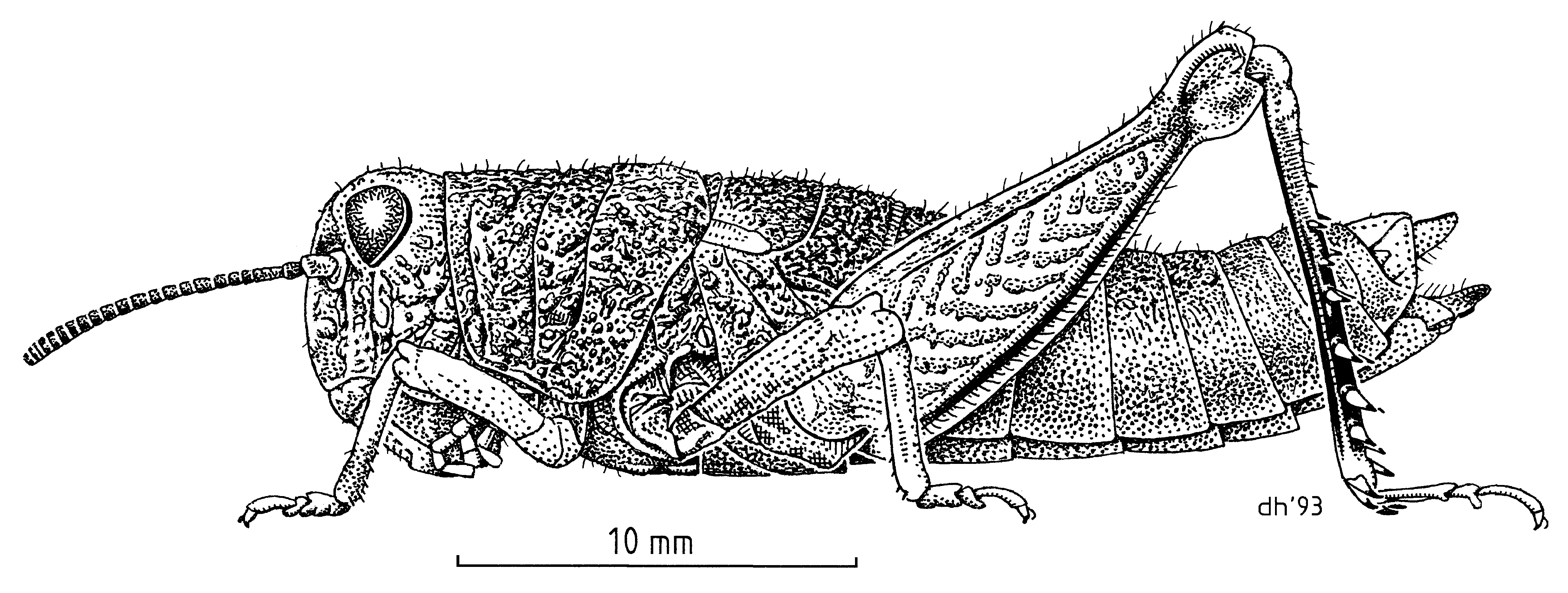
- Sigaus robustus illustrated by Des Helmore

Conservation status
- Nationally Endangered (NZ TCS)

Scientific classification
- Kingdom: Animalia
- Phylum: Arthropoda
- Clade: Pancrustacea
- Class: Insecta
- Order: Orthoptera
- Suborder: Caelifera
- Family: Acrididae
- Genus: Sigaus; Hutton, 1898
- Species: S. robustus

Binomial name
- Sigaus robustus (Bigelow, 1967)
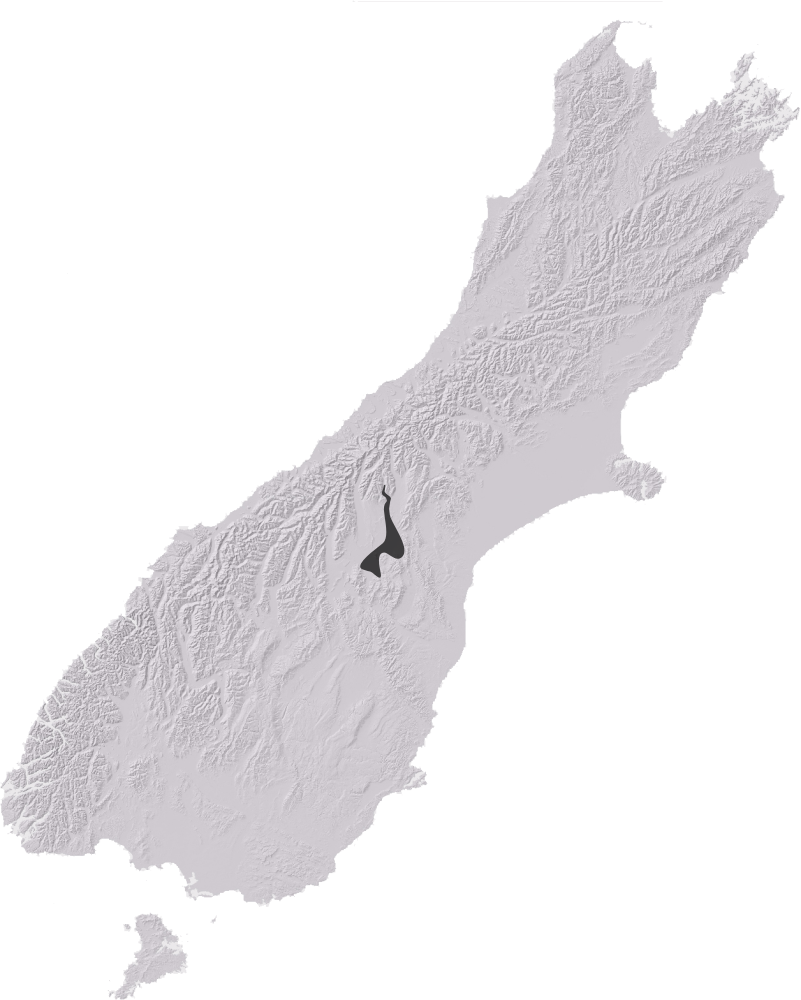
- The distribution of S. robustus in New Zealand

Synonyms
- Brachaspis robustus

= Sigaus robustus =

Robust grasshopper

Species of grasshopper

Sigaus robustus is a New Zealand species of grasshopper classified as Threatened: Nationally Endangered. It is restricted to open stony habitat of the Mackenzie Basin of the South Island. Although a grasshopper, it is a poor jumper, relying on camouflage to hide from predators. It is threatened by introduced mammals such as stoats, hedgehogs, and rats.

The New Zealand entomologist Tara Murray told North & South magazine in 2019: "They can actually jump, they just don't land very well. On a hot day, an adult male can jump up to 1.5m, multiple times. Females are bulkier, so they don't jump as far. These grasshoppers freeze as a first defence. If they do jump, it often ends as a back flop, belly flop or general 'thock' on the ground."

== Species description ==
Sigaus robustus is extremely well camouflaged, often relying on visual crypsis as passive defense against predation. It is also sexually dimorphic; adult males have a body length of 18–22 mm (0.71–0.87 in.) and adult females 38–42 mm (1.5–1.7 in.). Males are estimated to have 5 instars and females 6, the same as several other sub-alpine and alpine grasshopper species within New Zealand. The wings on S. robustus are very small, between 1 and 2 millimetres (0.039 and 0.079 in), making this species flightless like most of New Zealand grasshoppers. There are three known colour morphs for adult S. robustus: 'Grey', 'Orange' and 'Black'. The most common colour morph is 'Grey' at approximately 60% of adult B. robustus; 'Orange' is about 40%, and the very rare 'Black' is less than 0.5%.

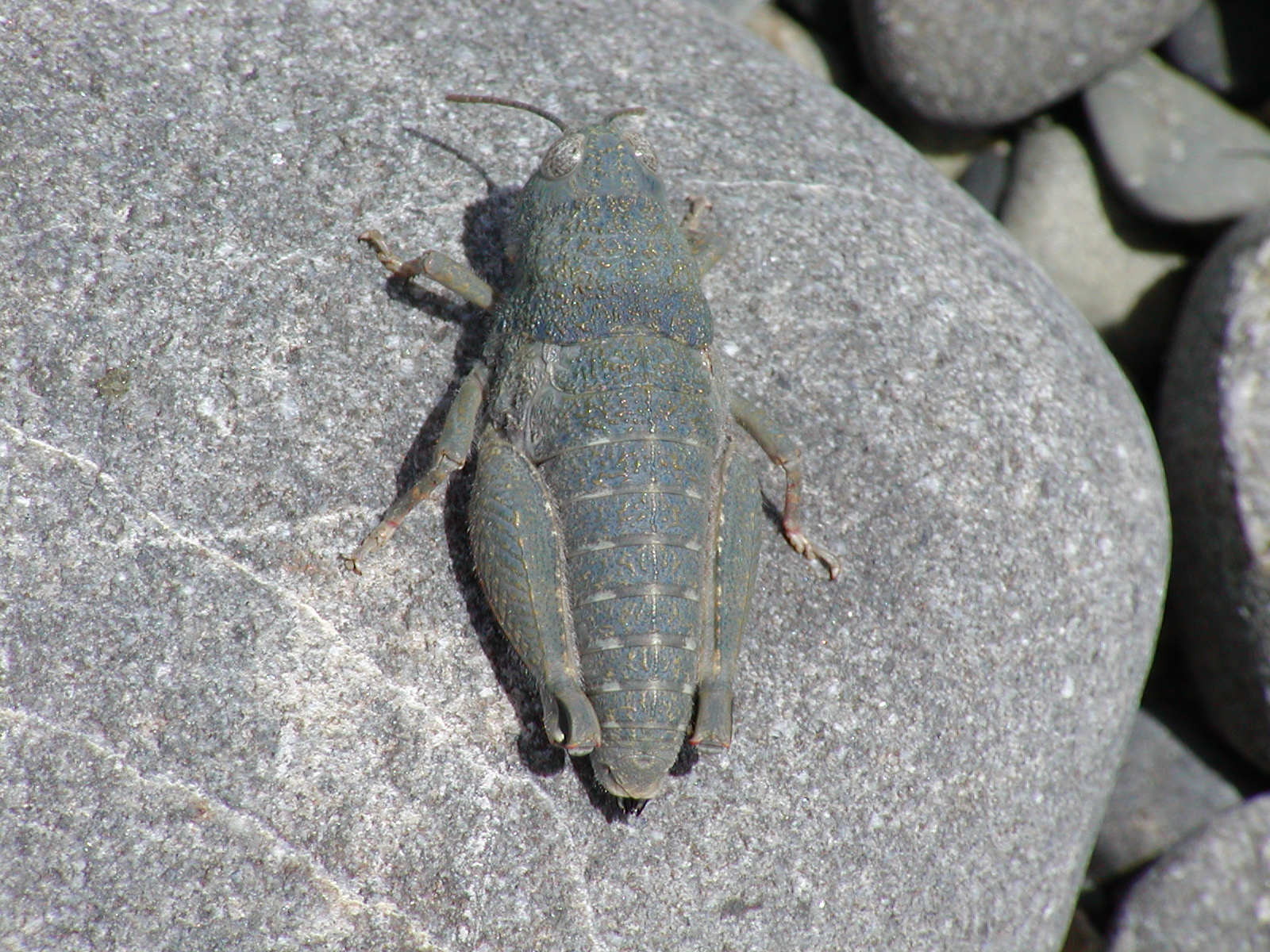
Colour morph 'Grey'.

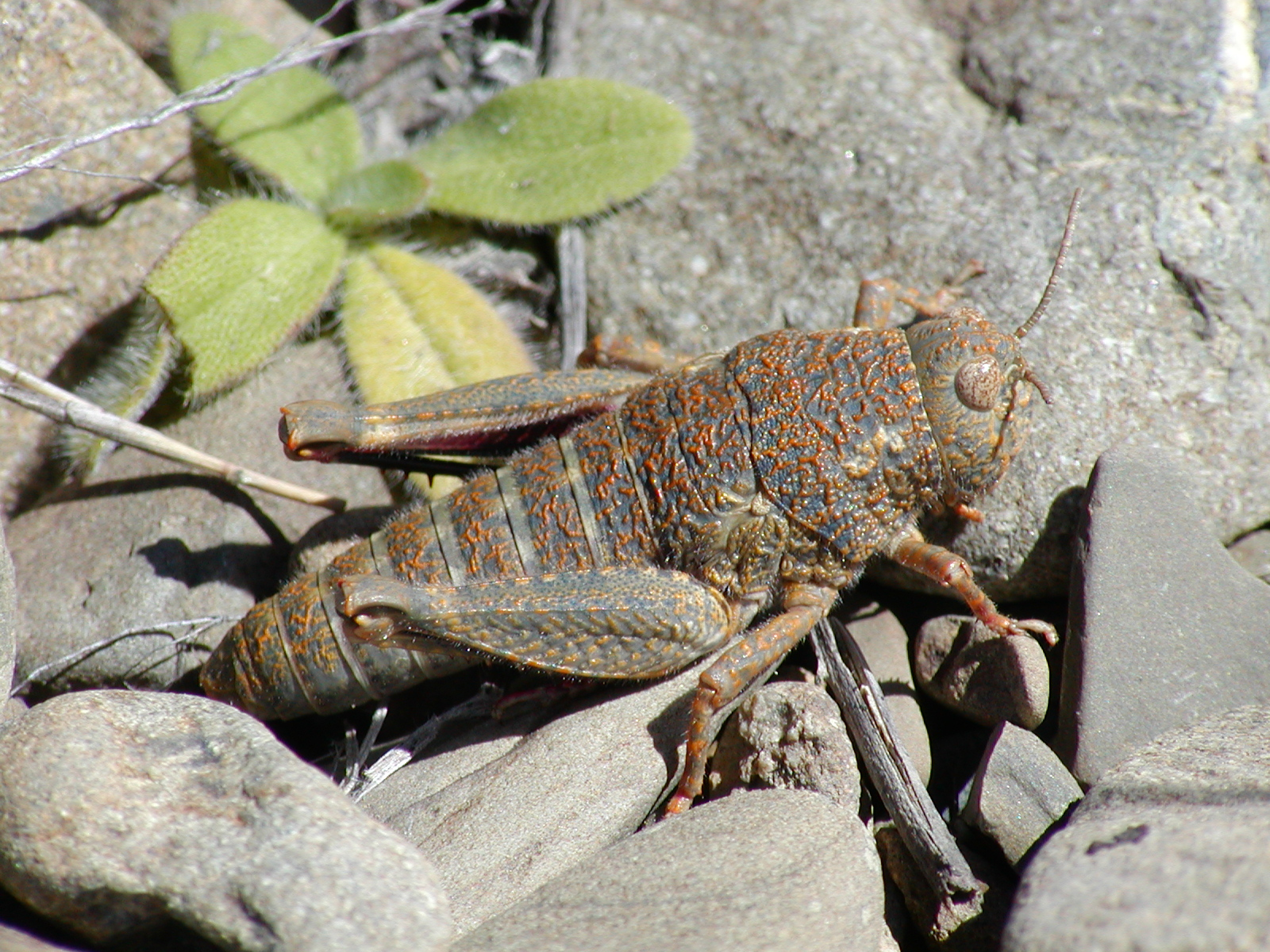
Colour morph 'Orange'.

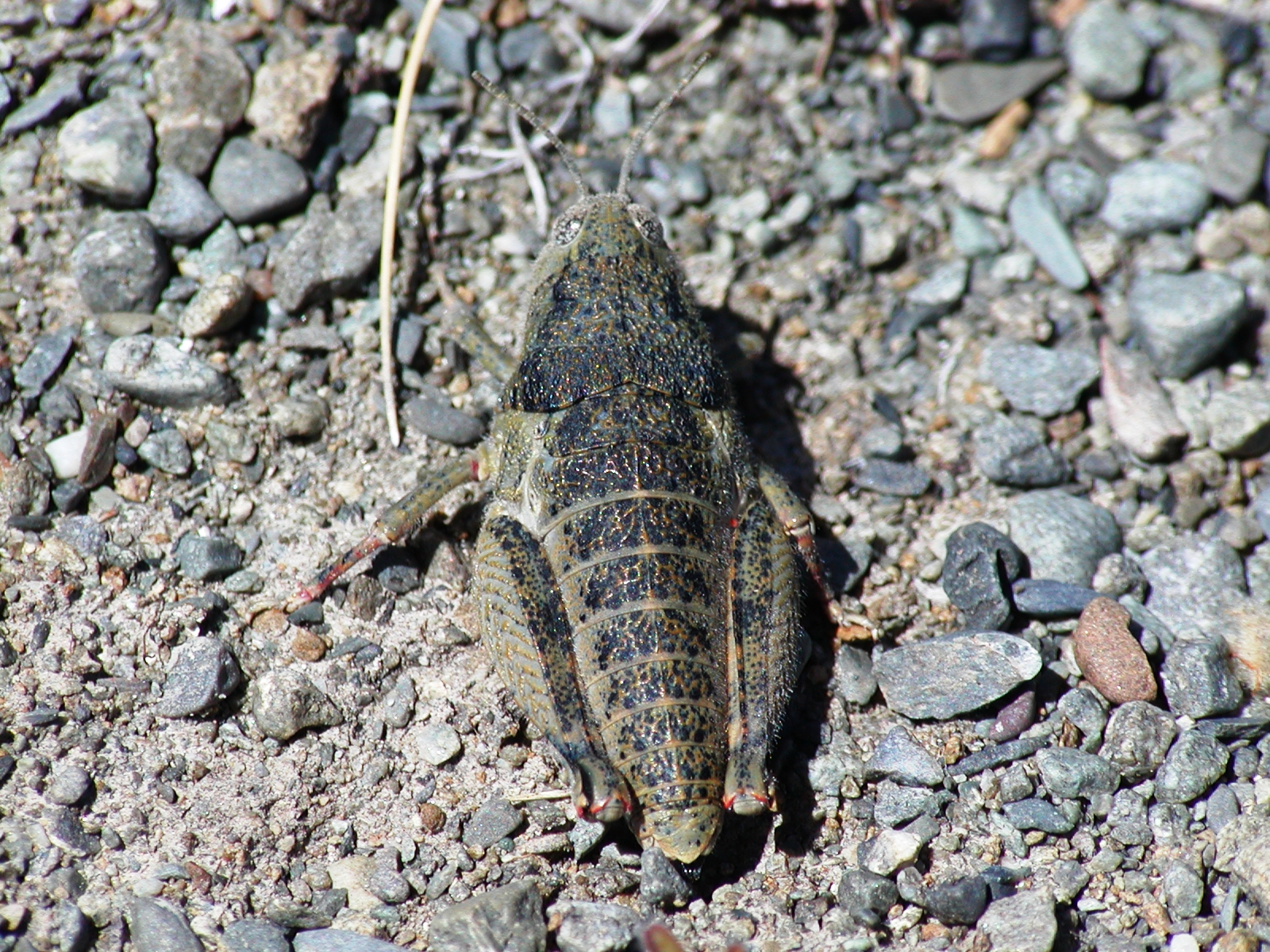
Colour morph 'Black'.

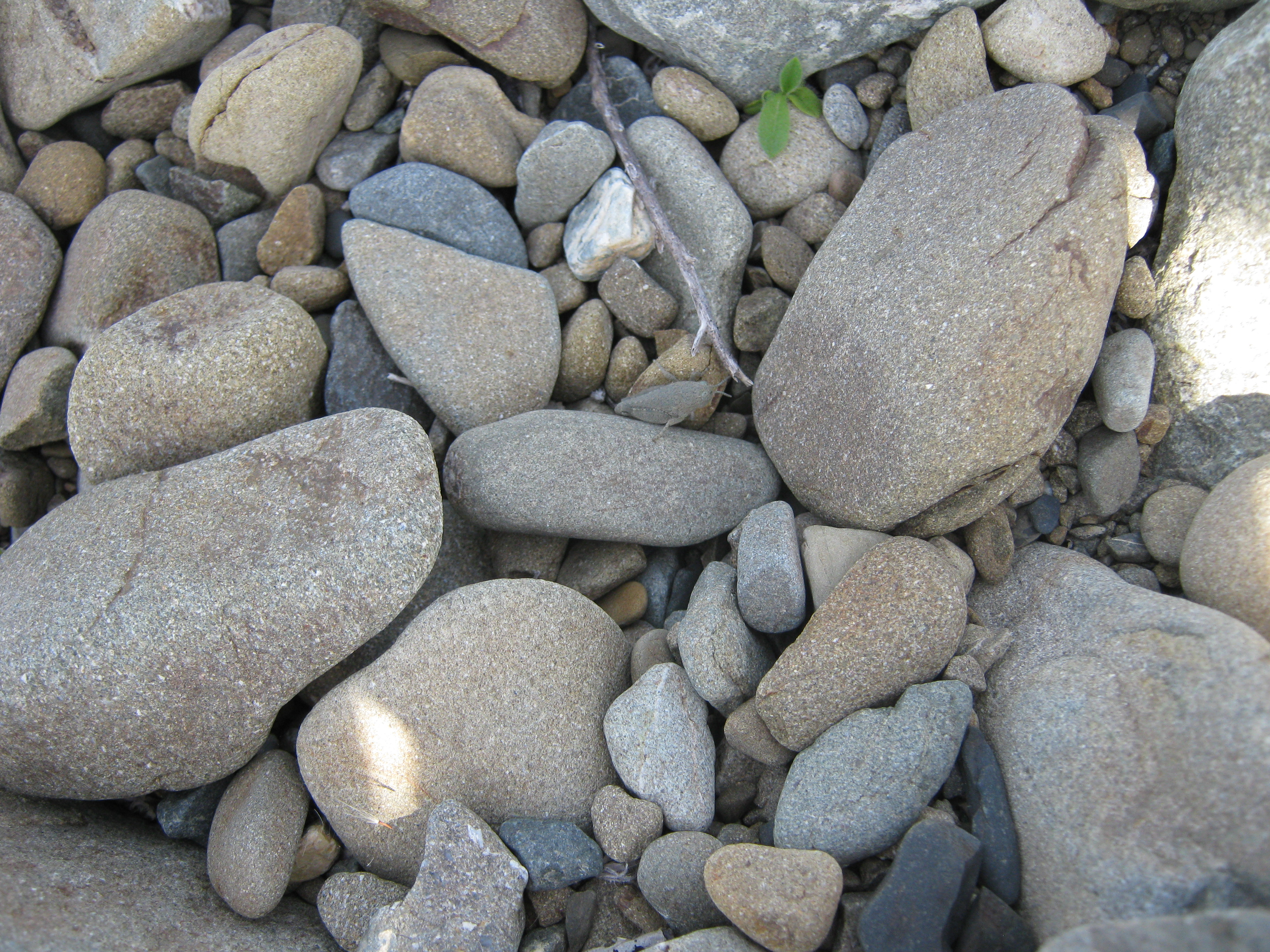
Sigaus robustus nymph is visually cryptic when surrounded by rocky habitat.

== Distribution ==
Sigaus robustus is only known from the Tekapo, Pukaki and Ōhau River catchments in the Mackenzie Basin. It can be found as far south as Lake Benmore (44°20′29″S 170°12′42″E) and as far north as the upper Fork Stream (43°58′24″S 170°24′04″E). B. robustus prefers open habitat of riverbeds and river terraces. Most of this stony habitat has been modified by introduced plant species and hydro-electric dams. The elevation range of Sigaus robustus is between 352 m (1,155 ft) on the lower Ōhau River and 1,060 m (3,480 ft) the upper Fork Stream. Detailed searches since 1980 have been carried out throughout the Mackenzie Basin and a good understanding of its current distribution is now known.

== Life history ==
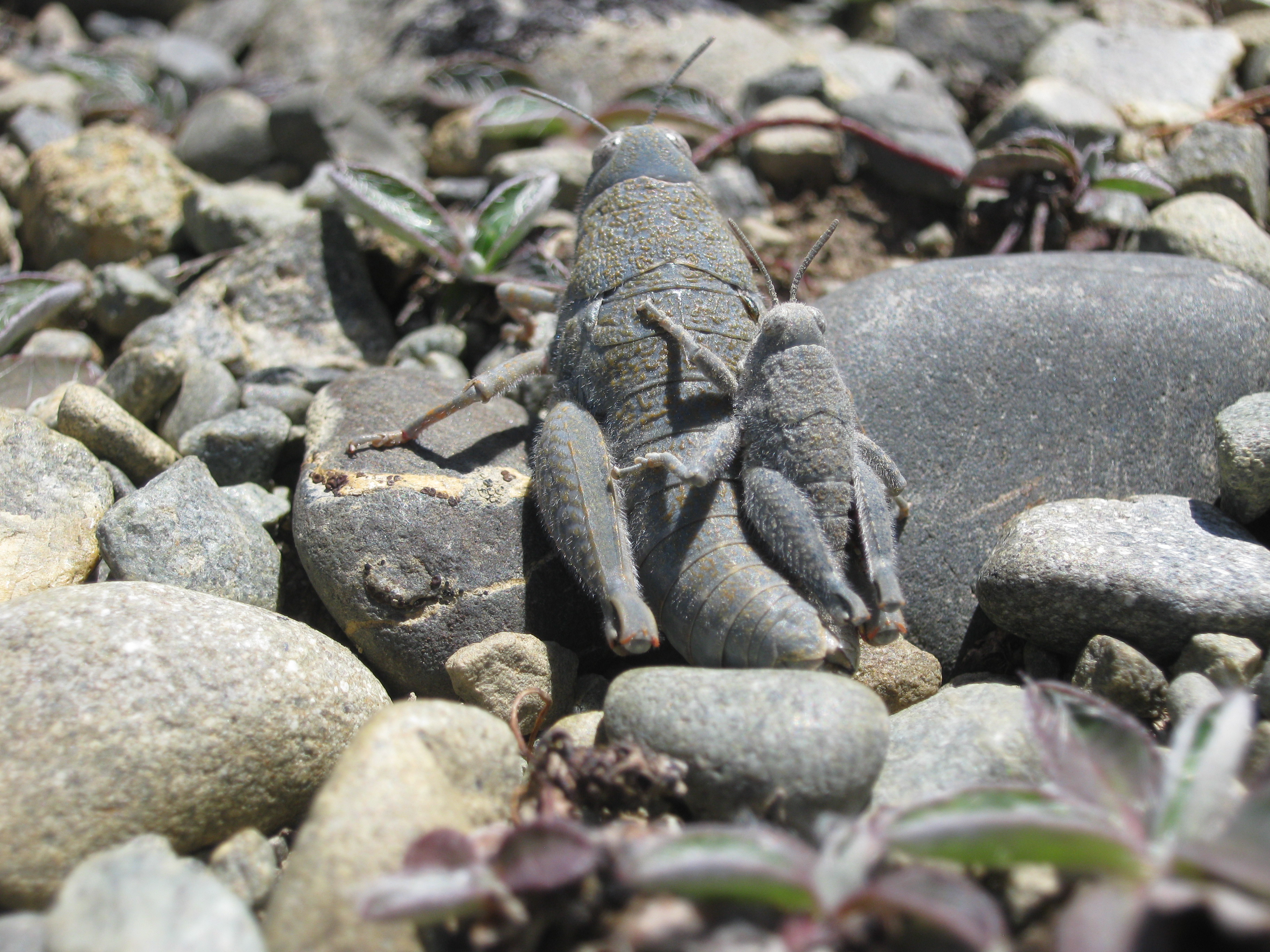
A mating pair of S. robustus showing that the female is much larger than the male.

The lifespan of S. robustus is more than two years. Eggs are laid from early summer to mid-autumn. Adult females lay one or two egg batches a season, each containing between 17 and 35 eggs. The majority of nymph emergence occurs in mid-summer, but early instar S. robustus have been seen later in the season. Because of the timing of emergence, it is thought eggs require a winter period in order to develop fully. This not an uncommon requirement for New Zealand grasshoppers. The nymphs then overwinter, often surviving temperatures well below 0 °C, and reach adulthood the following summer. Adult males will copulate with multiple females and vice versa, suggesting this species has a promiscuous mating system. The ratio of male to female B. robustus alters over New Zealand summer: at the start of the summer in November the ratio is 56% male and 44% female. By December females (57%) outnumber males (43%). For the rest of summer, males predominate: in January at 54% male to 46% female, and in March 82% male and only 18% female.

== Habitat and diet ==
Sigaus robustus is always found in very rocky areas (stony floodplain terraces, fluvio-glacial outwash, recent fluvial outwash, and rocky braided river), and is never found in vegetation. It is a generalist herbivore and is known to eat Anthosachne scabra (syn. Elymus rectisetus) and Poa pratensis, the herb Achillea millifolium, and unidentified mosses and lichens. Faeces analysed during spring suggested that moss and lichen are important in its diet; this might reflect their ability to absorb moisture at night. Food succulence is important in grasshopper diets, and mosses and lichens may provide a means of withstanding the aridity and drought of the Mackenzie Basin.

== Conservation ==
Two species of grasshopper are listed for protection under the Wildlife Act 1953 of New Zealand: B. robustus and Sigaus childi. Sigaus takahe is also indirectly protected as it is only known from the Murchison Mountains Specially Protected (Takahē) Area.

As early as the 1960s, S. robustus was noted as rare and in need of conservation action. In 1993, it was estimated that there were only approximately 800 adults in the wild. By the end of 2009/2010 summer it was estimated that this had declined to approximately 600 adults. In 1993, most adults were found in three key very large populations and only a few sub-populations; by 2010, numerous new sub-populations have been discovered, but the three key populations from 1993 were now very sparse and made up of numerous sub-populations. Introduced mammalian predators are one of the known threats to B. robustus.

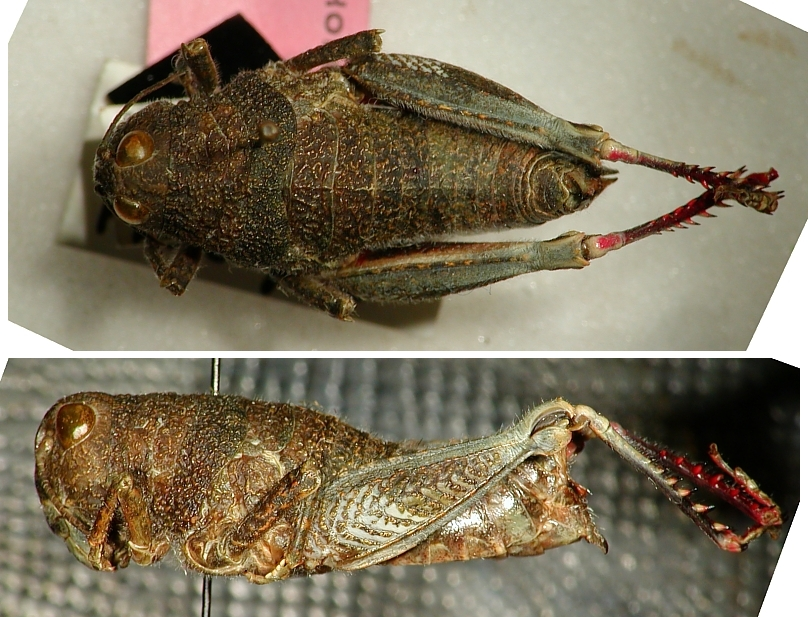
Type specimen of S. robustus

Both introduce mammalian predators and native lizards are likely to pose a substantial threat to S. robustus. In December 2017, 20 B. robustus were fitted with radio transmitters which operated for 3–12 days to determine their home range for future translocations. In July 2018 a 440 ha area in the Mackenzie Basin known as the "Tekapo Triangle" was transferred to the control of the Department of Conservation and set aside as a reserve for S. robustus. Six pairs were taken into captivity in an attempt to breed them.

== Type information ==
- Bigelow, R.S. 1967. The Grasshoppers of New Zealand, Their Taxonomy and Distribution. University of Canterbury, Christchurch.
- Type locality: Ahuriri River, Otago. 44°27′29″S 169°56′09″E. It is virtually certain that B. robustus is now absent from the holotype and paratype localities. These localities and surrounding suitable habitat for B. robustus have been searched several times unsuccessfully.
- Type specimen: Female; 21 April 1963; R.R. Granger; holotype and paratype are deposited in the Canterbury Museum, Christchurch.
