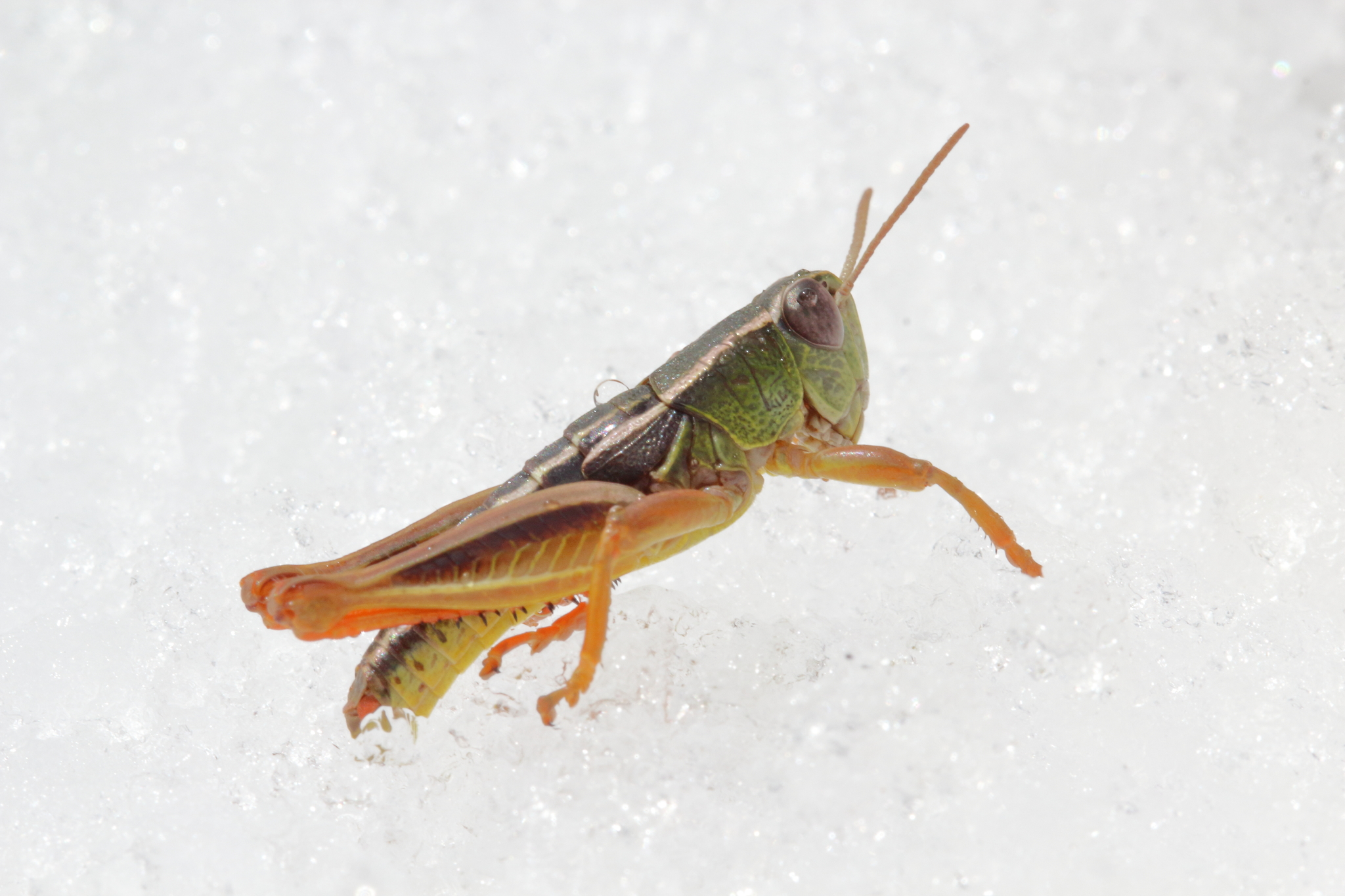
- Sigaus nitidus, New Zealand

Scientific classification
- Kingdom: Animalia
- Phylum: Arthropoda
- Clade: Pancrustacea
- Class: Insecta
- Order: Orthoptera
- Suborder: Caelifera
- Family: Acrididae
- Tribe: Catantopini
- Genus: Sigaus
- Species: S. nitidus

Binomial name
- Sigaus nitidus Hutton, 1898

= Sigaus nitidus =

Species of grasshopper

Sigaus nitidus is a species of short-horned grasshopper in the family Acrididae, endemic to New Zealand. This alpine grasshopper species is flightless and silent.

== Taxonomy ==
Sigaus nitidus was described by Hutton in 1898 but in the genus Paprides. "Nitidus" means shiny. In 1967 Bigelow added P. dugdali to this genus. In 2023 thirteen species of New Zealand cold-adapted grasshopper were combined into the genus Sigaus, creating the new combination Sigaus nitidus.

== Biology and description ==
Sigaus nitidus is adapted to alpine conditions. This grasshopper eats a wide range of alpine herbs but avoids tussock grass. Females are larger than males but their antenna have the same number of sensilla. Sigaus nitidus has a variable life-cycle of two or three years, overwintering as egg, nymph or adult.

== Distribution ==
Sigaus nitidus is found above the tree line on mountains in South Island New Zealand from Mt Arthur in the north to Canterbury, where it is the most abundant grasshopper species. During the Last Glacial Maximum S. nitidus would have had a wider distribution. Species distribution models predict that global warming will result in more fragmented habitat and loss of approximately 20% of suitable habitat for S. nitidus.
