= The Nuns Veil =

Mountain in New Zealand

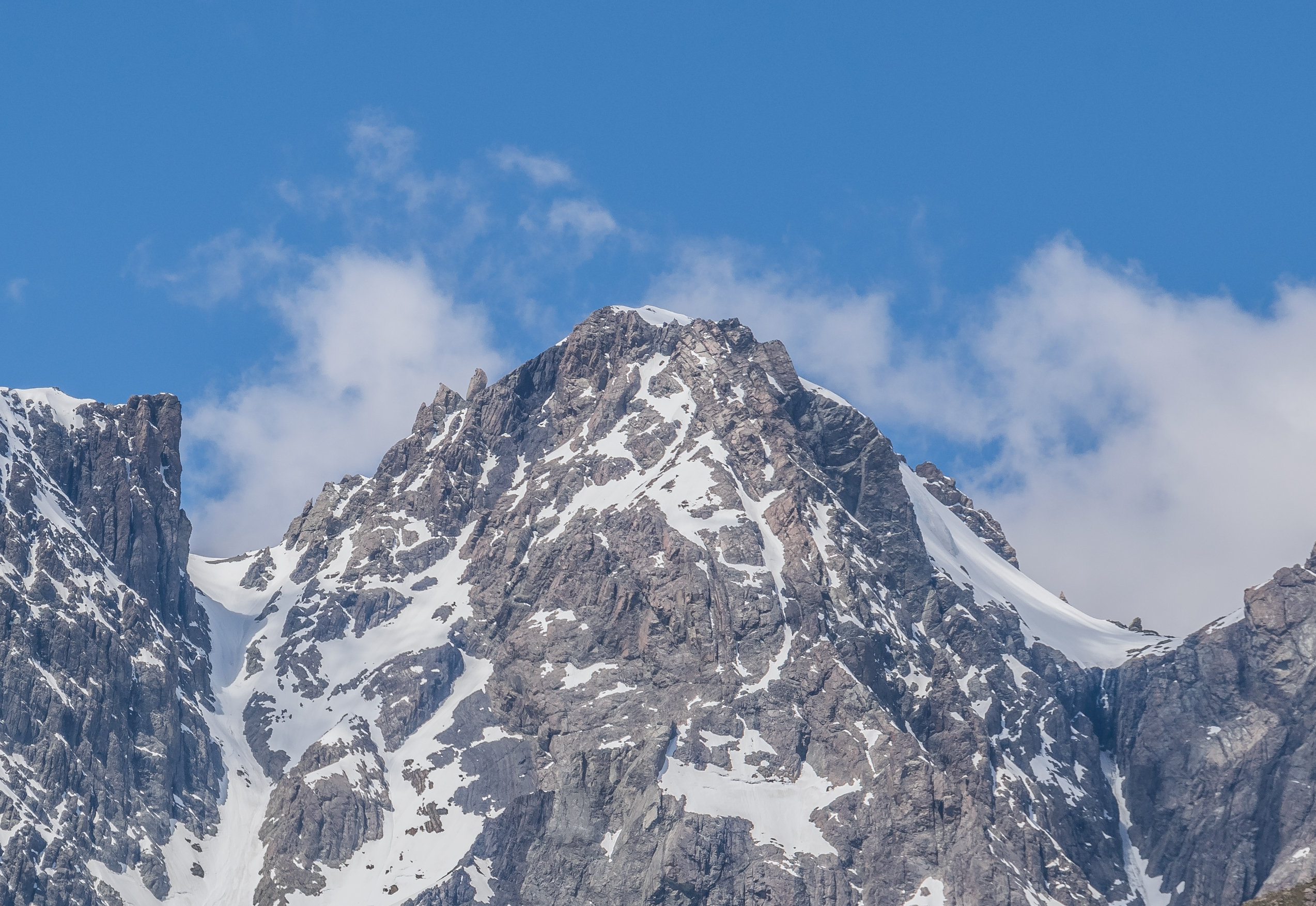
- West aspect

Highest point
- Elevation: 2,749 m (9,019 ft)
- Prominence: 558 m (1,831 ft)
- Isolation: 11.3 km (7.0 mi)
- Listing: New Zealand #21
- Coordinates: 43°41′36″S 170°14′50″E

Geography
- Location within New Zealand
- Interactive map of The Nuns Veil
- Location: South Island
- Country: New Zealand
- Region: Canterbury
- Protected area: Aoraki / Mount Cook National Park
- Parent range: Southern Alps; Liebig Range
- Topo map(s): NZMS260 I36; Topo50 BX16

Climbing
- First ascent: 4 December 1907

The Nuns Veil is a 2,749-metre-elevation (9,019-foot) mountain in the Canterbury Region of New Zealand.

== Description ==
The Nuns Veil is set in the Liebig Range of the Southern Alps and is situated in the Canterbury Region of South Island. This peak is located 14 kilometres (8.7 mi) southeast of Aoraki / Mount Cook in Aoraki / Mount Cook National Park. Precipitation runoff from the mountain drains west into Tasman Lake, south to the Tasman River via Gorilla Stream, and east to the Jollie River via Pinnacle Stream. Topographic relief is significant as the summit rises 2,034 metres (6,673 feet) above Tasman Lake in 4.4 kilometres. The nearest higher peak is Nazomi, 11 kilometres to the northwest. The first ascent of the summit was made on 4 December 1907 by Peter Graham, Mick Collett, and Alistair Mackay. This mountain was named in 1889 by New Zealand surveyor Noel Brodrick. Other landforms in the immediate vicinity which also fit the Christian naming theme include: The Acolyte, Mount Biretta, Monastery Peak, Monk Glacier, Abbey Pass, The Abbot, and The Abbess.

== Climbing ==
Climbing routes with first ascents:

- Gorilla Stream – Peter Graham, Mick Collett, Dr. Mackay – (1907)
- Turner's Couloir (descent) – George Bannister, Samuel Turner – (1912)
- Pinnacle Stream – C.S. Brockett, S.J. Harris, N.D. Dench – (1953)
- The Far Side (East Face) – Kiersten Price, Dave Crow – (1995)
- Unveiled (West Face) – Sean Waters, Tim Balla – (1996)
- Five O’Clock Shadow (West Face) – Asher March, Ed Sheppard – (2017)
- After Thought (West Face)

== Climate ==
Based on the Köppen climate classification, The Nuns Veil is located in a marine west coast (Cfb) climate zone, with a subpolar oceanic climate (Cfc) at the summit. Prevailing westerly winds blow moist air from the Tasman Sea onto the mountains, where the air is forced upward by the mountains (orographic lift), causing moisture to drop in the form of rain or snow. This climate supports the Nuns Veil Glacier on the peak's south slope. The months of December through February offer the most favourable weather for viewing or climbing this peak.

== Gallery ==
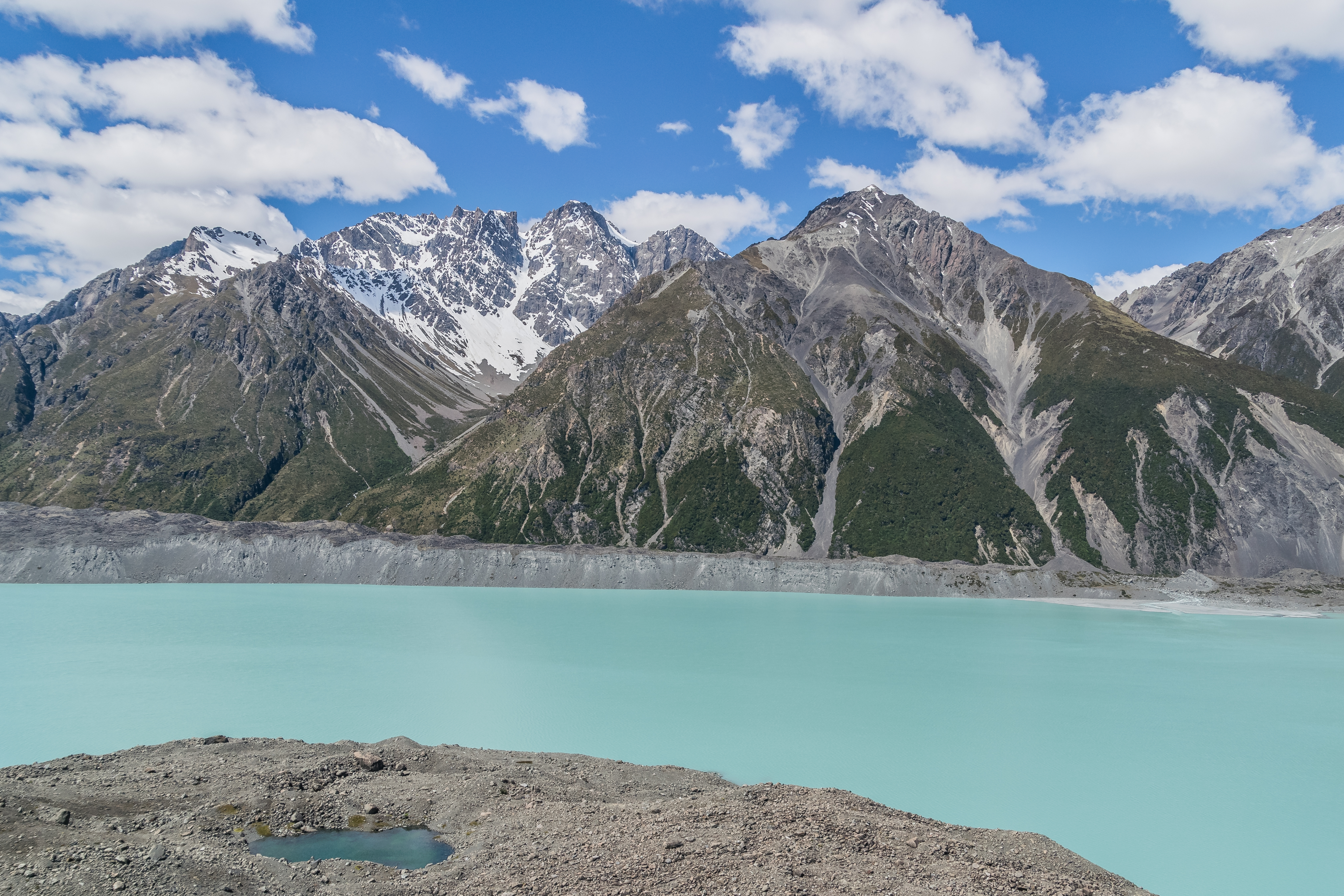
The Nuns Veil left of center. The Acolyte to the right.
Tasman Lake in foreground.

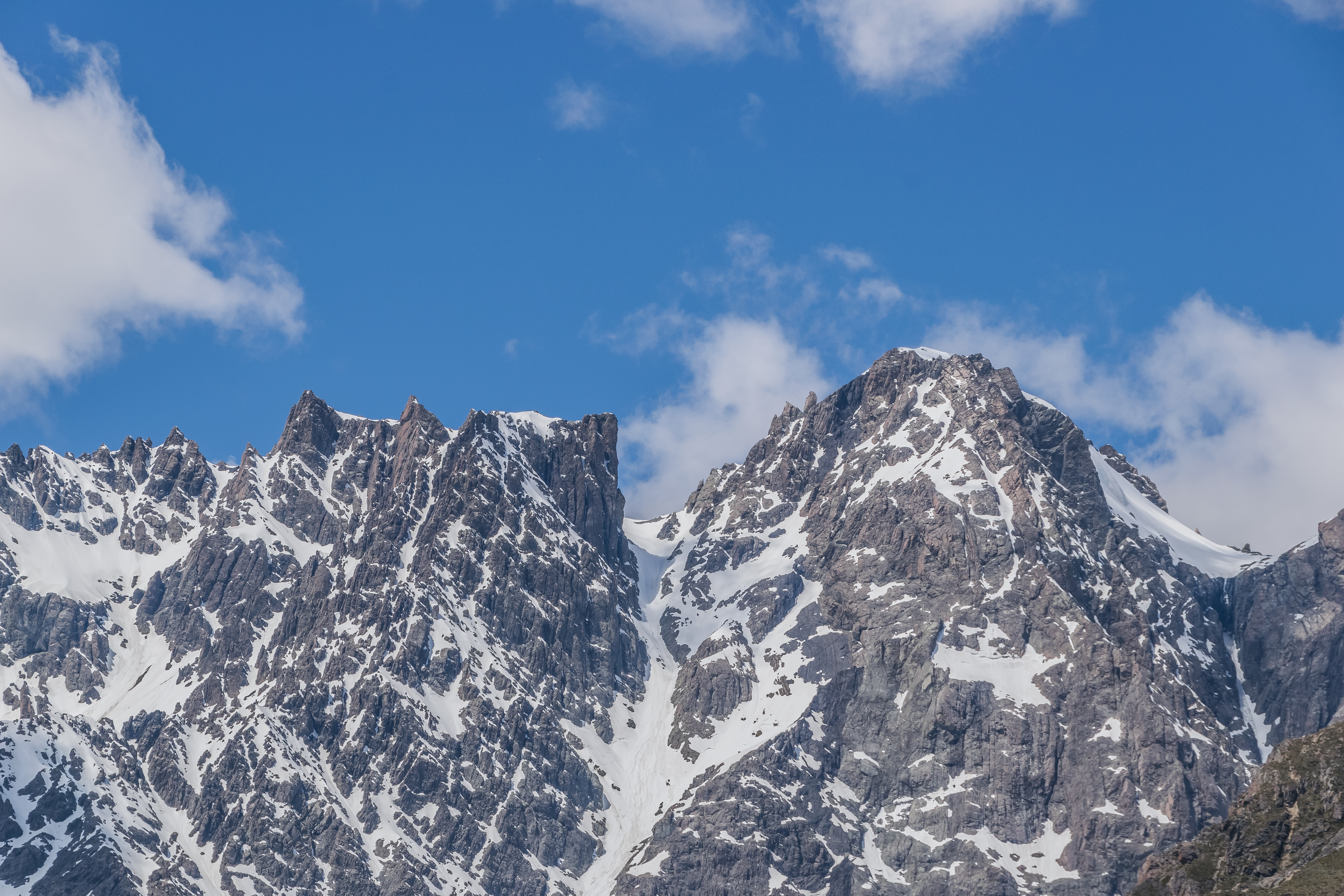
Mount Biretta (left) and The Nuns Veil (right)

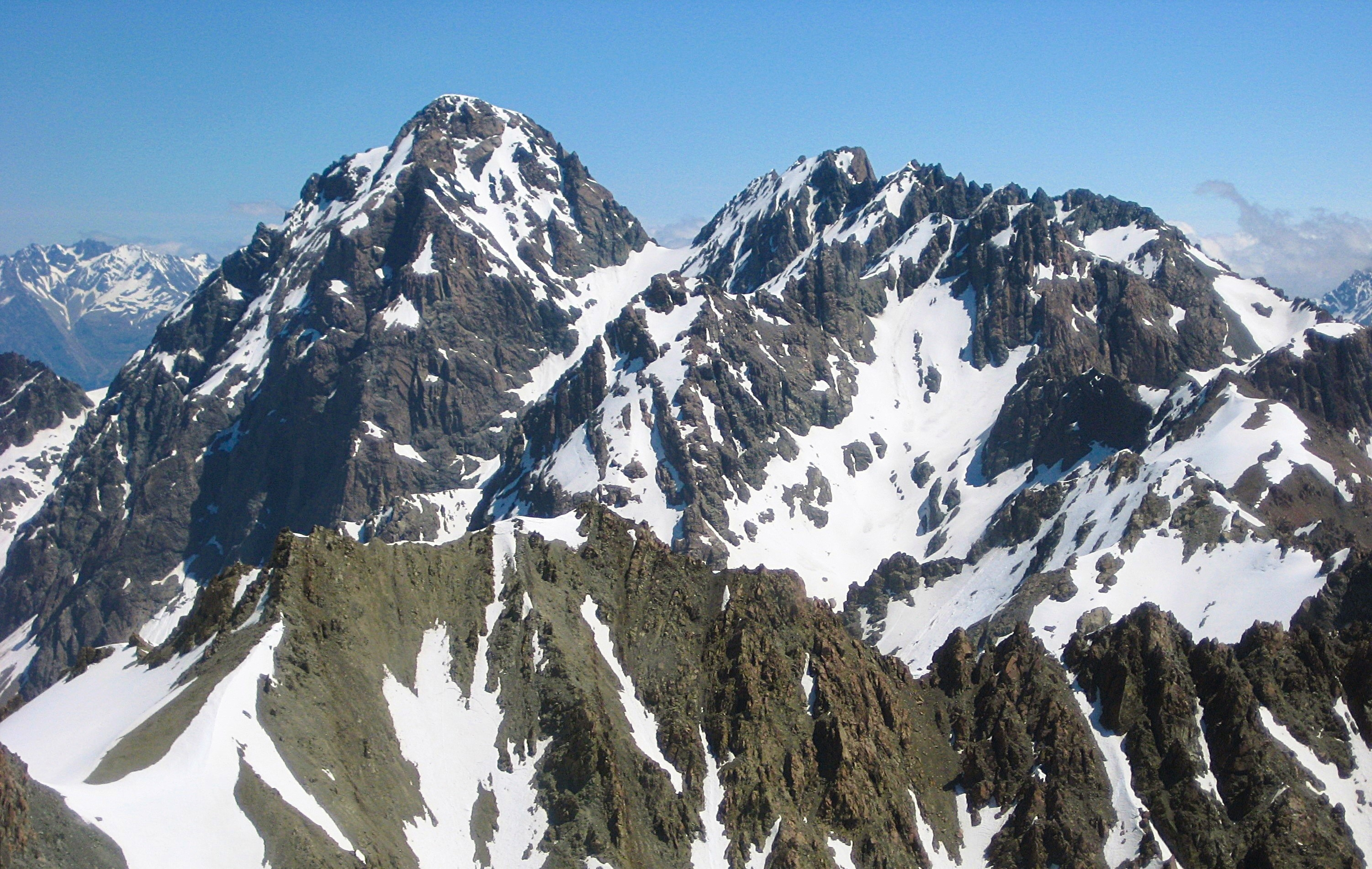
Aerial view of The Nuns Veil (left) from northeast.

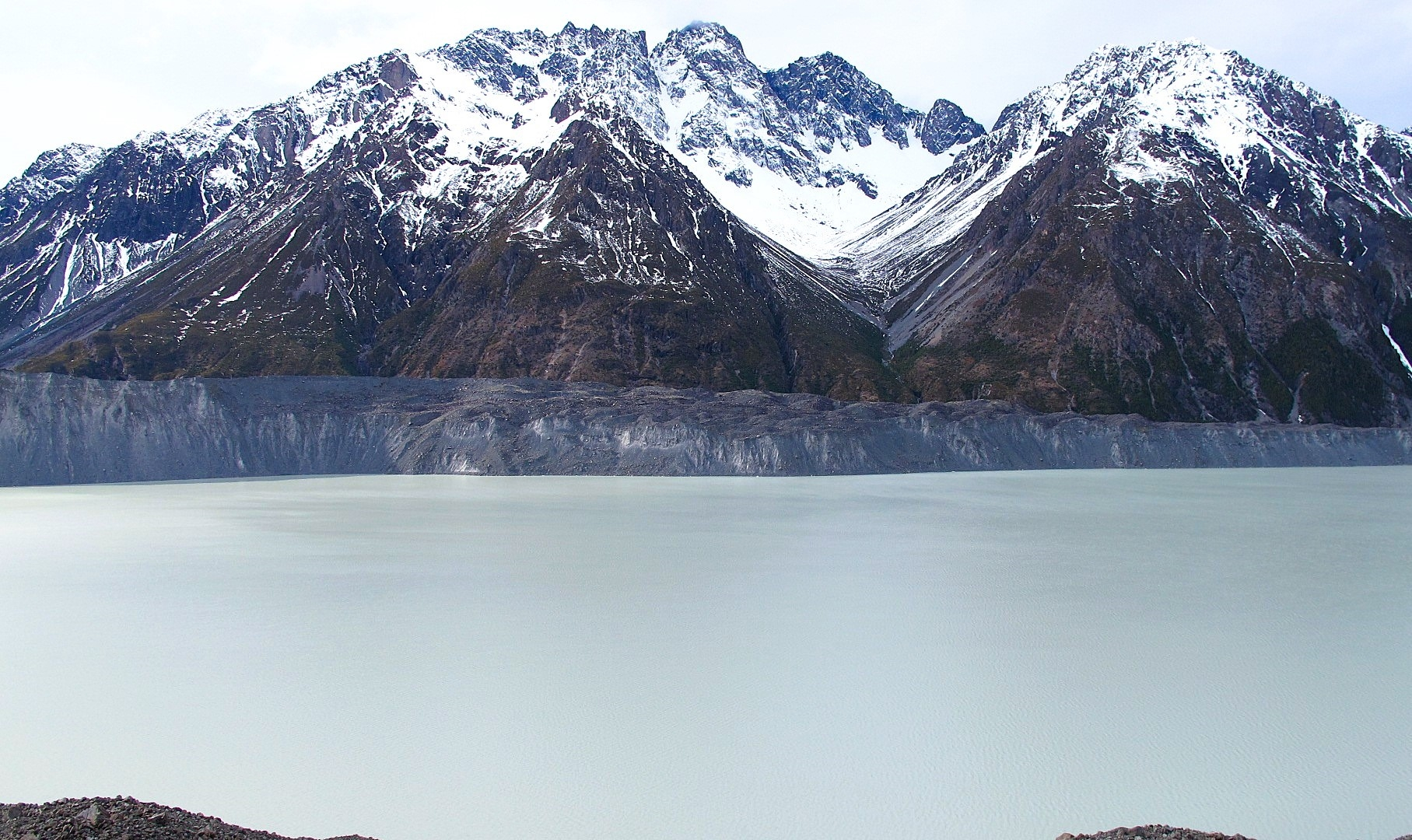
The Nuns Veil centred. The Acolyte to the right.

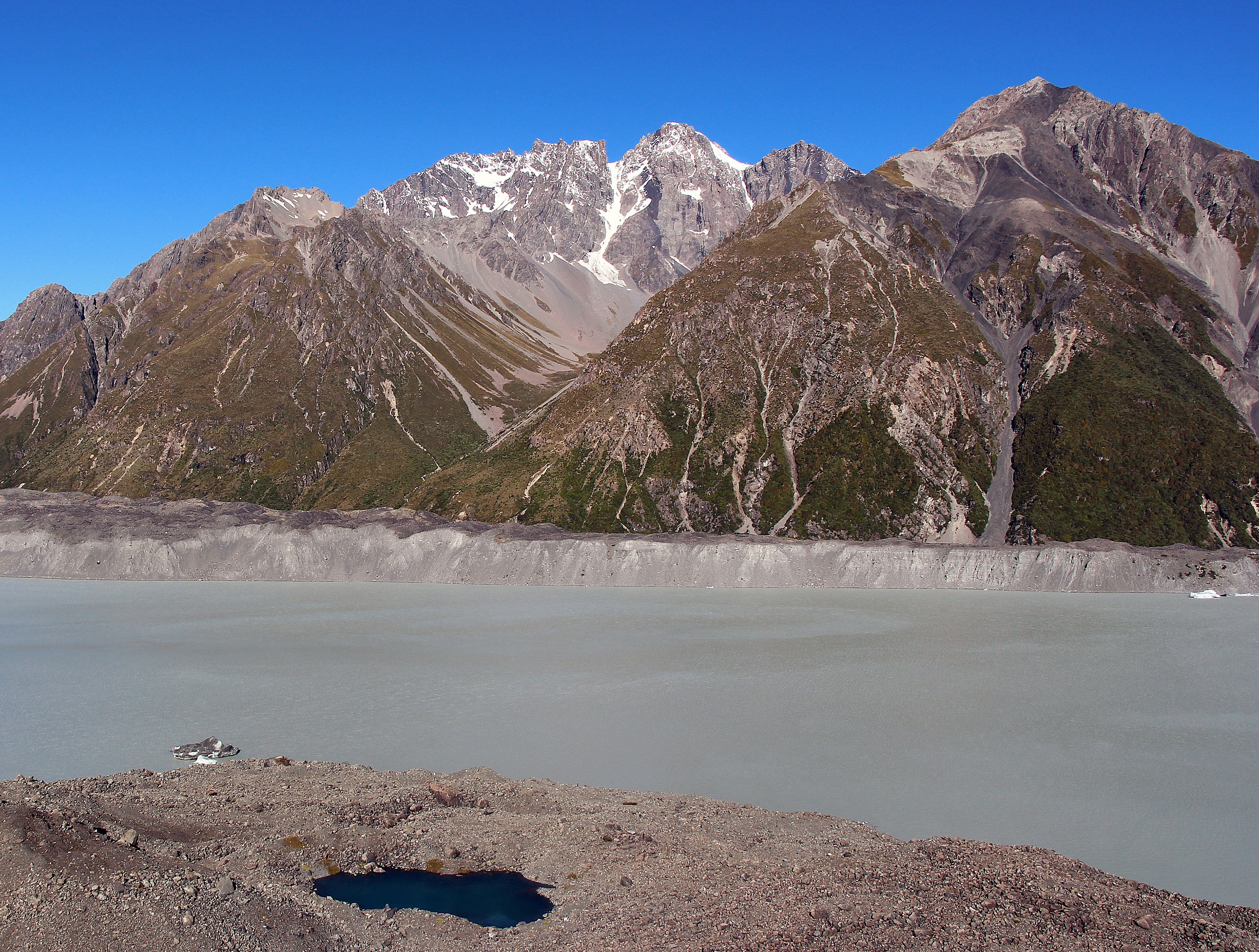
The Nuns Veil centred. The Acolyte to the right.

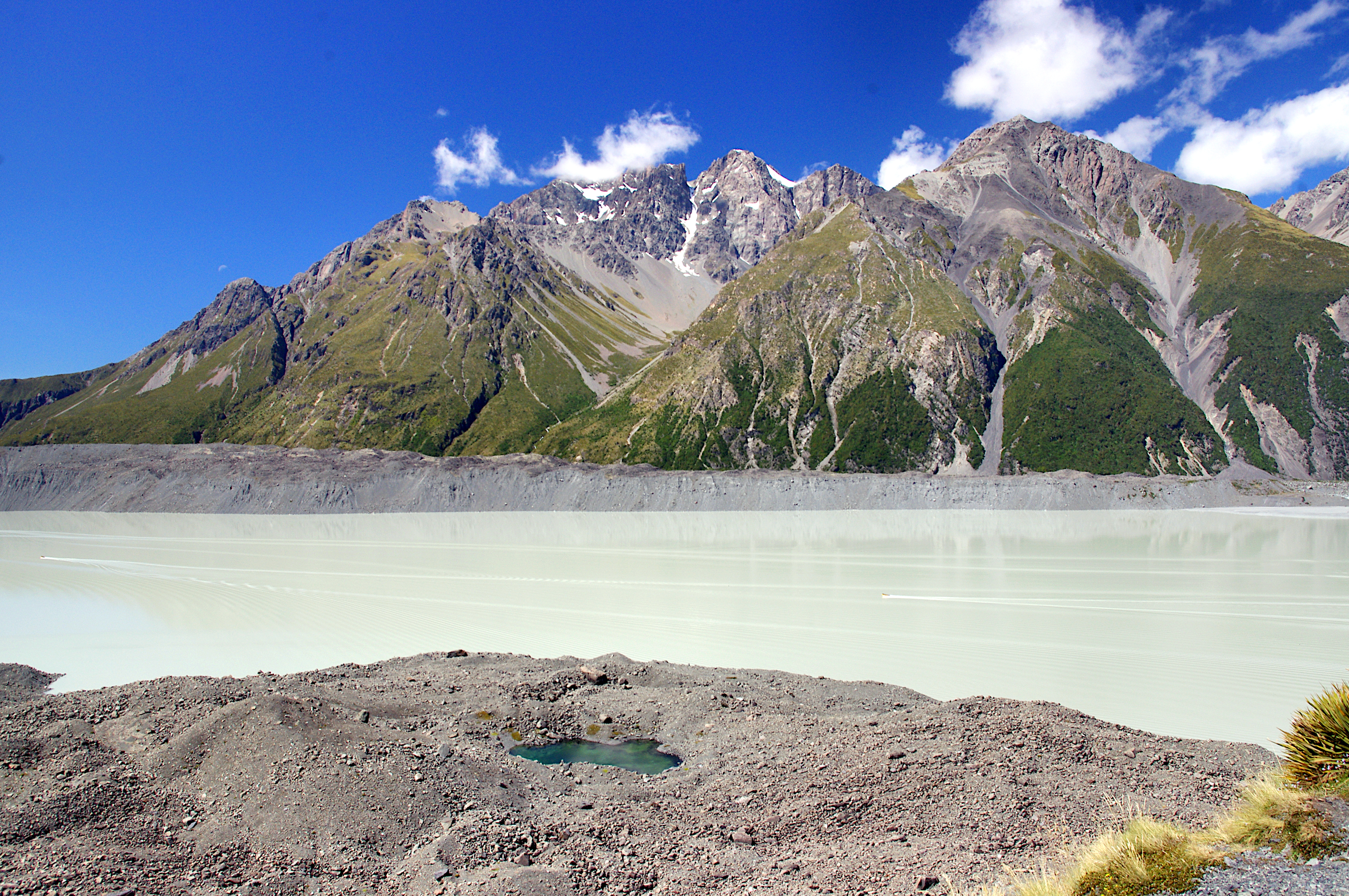
The Nuns Veil centred. The Acolyte to the right.

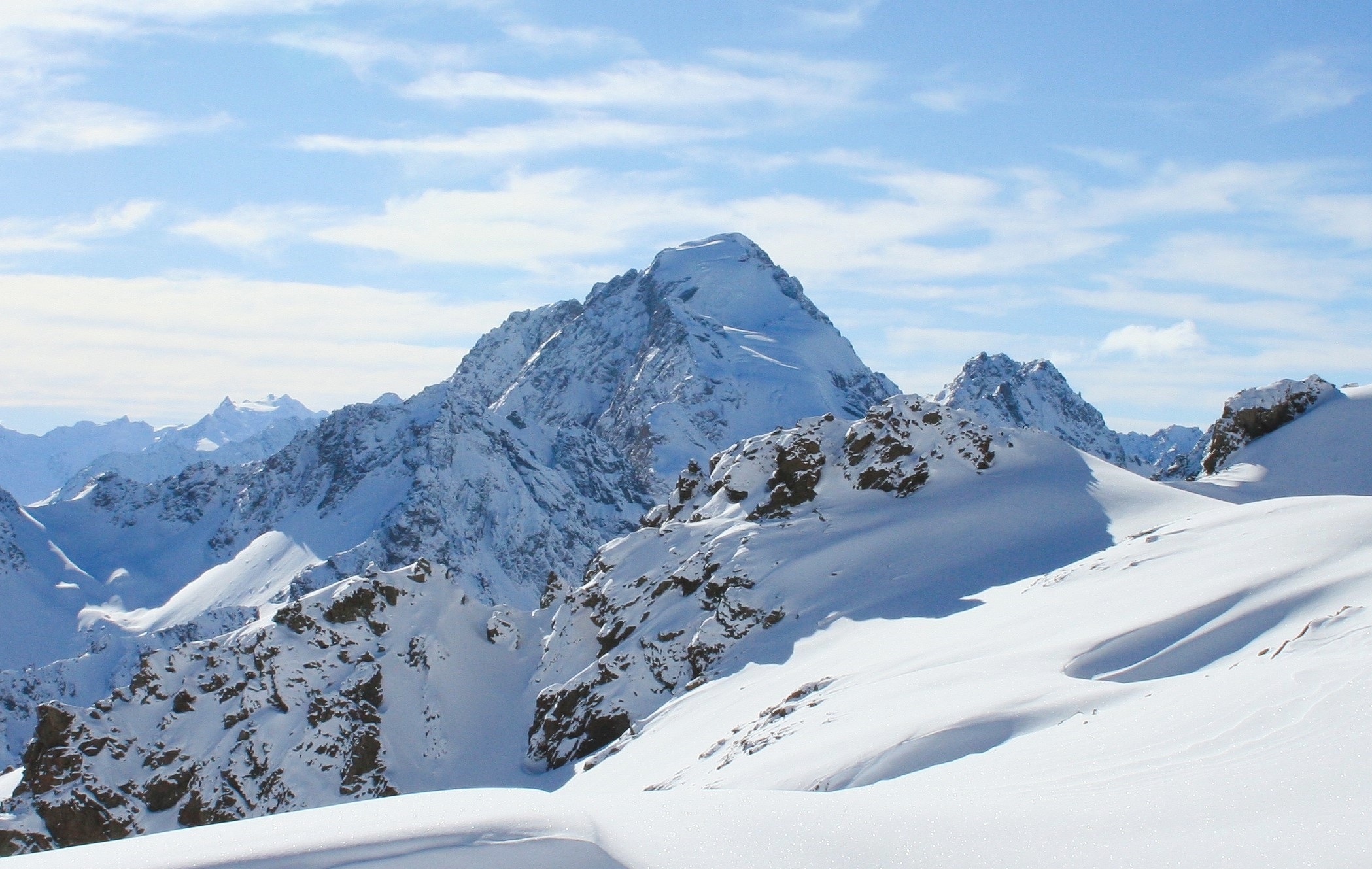
South aspect

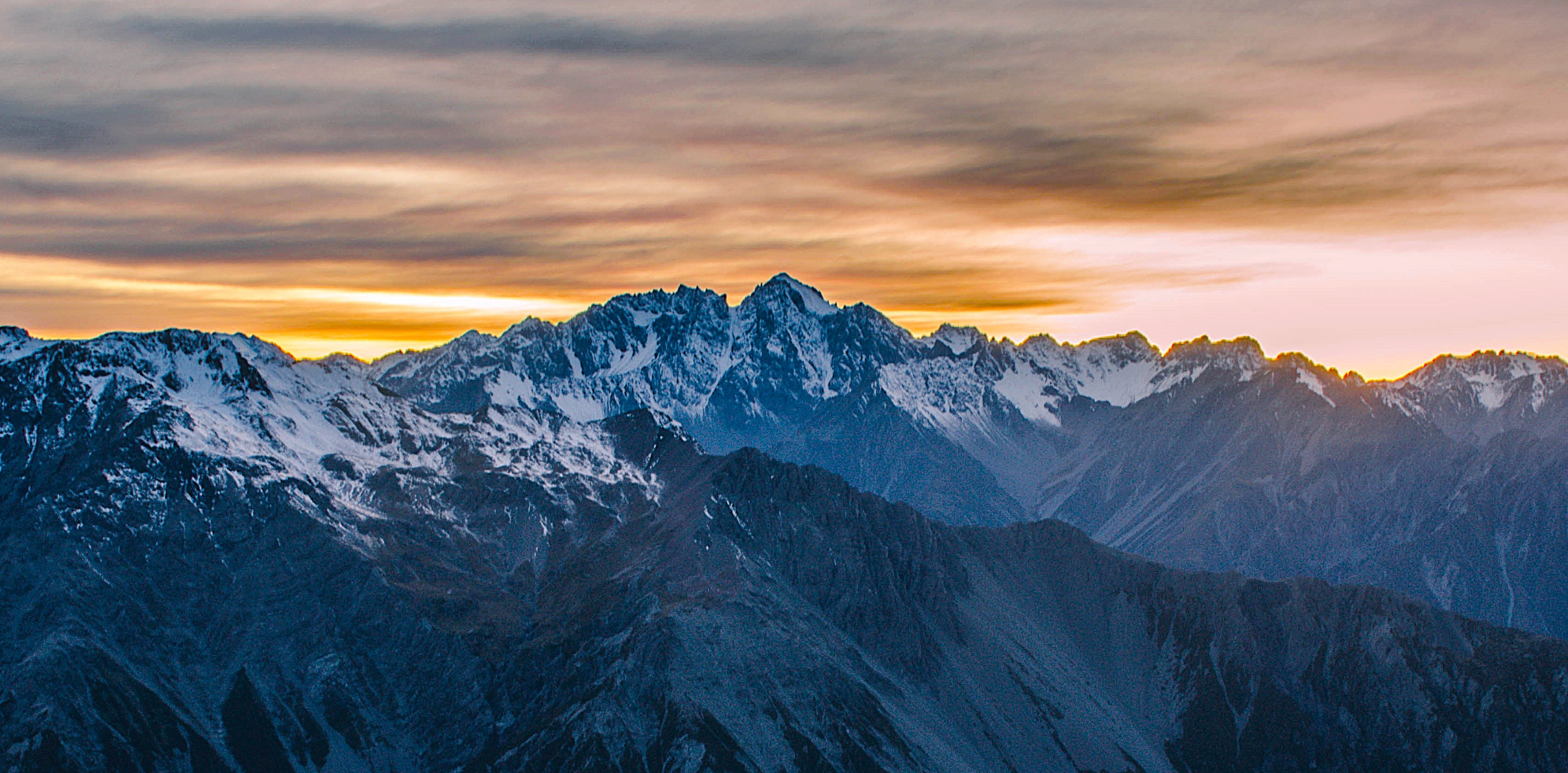
The Nuns Veil centred on skyline, viewed from Mueller Hut

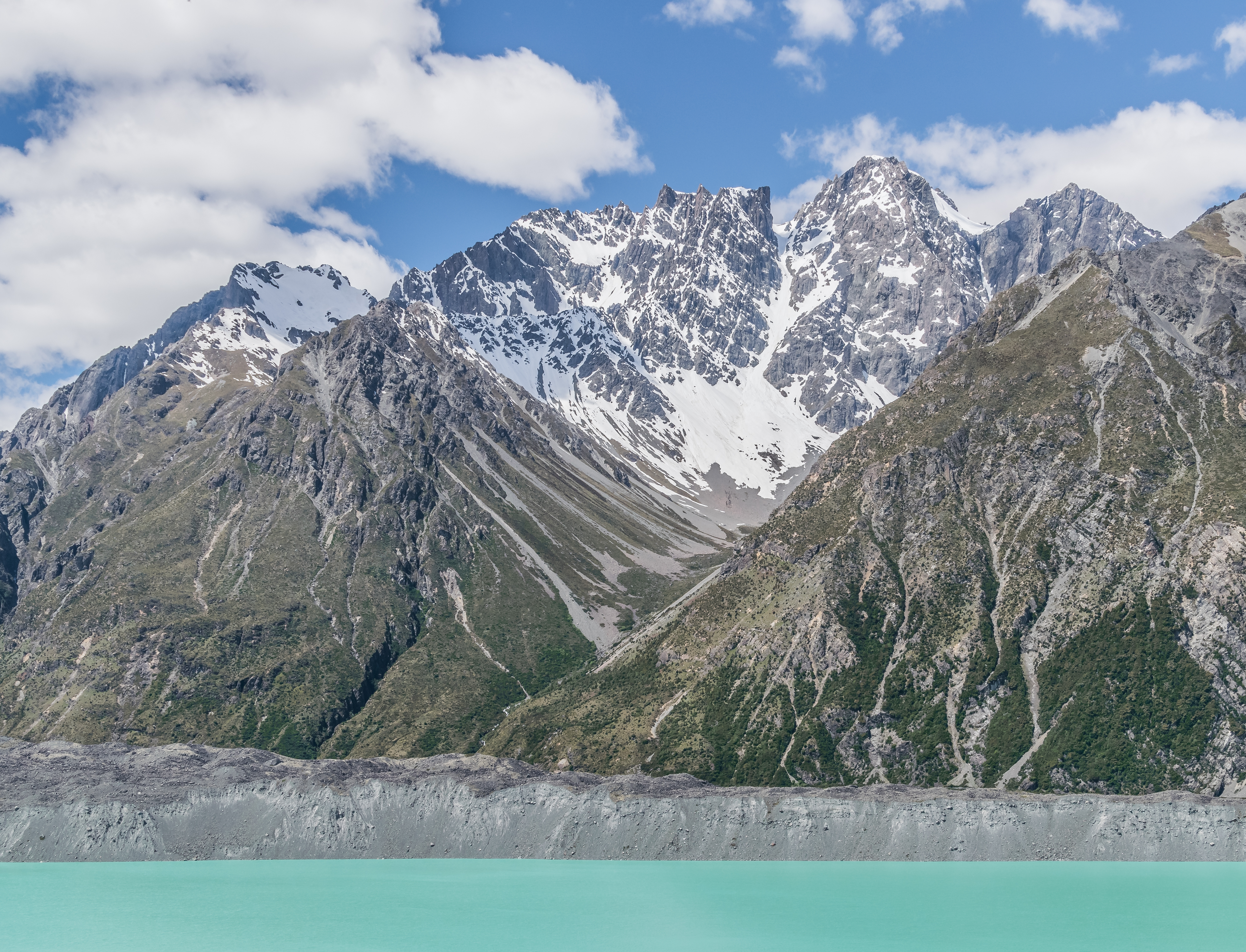

== See also ==
- List of mountains of New Zealand by height
