= Murchison River (New Zealand) =

River in New Zealand

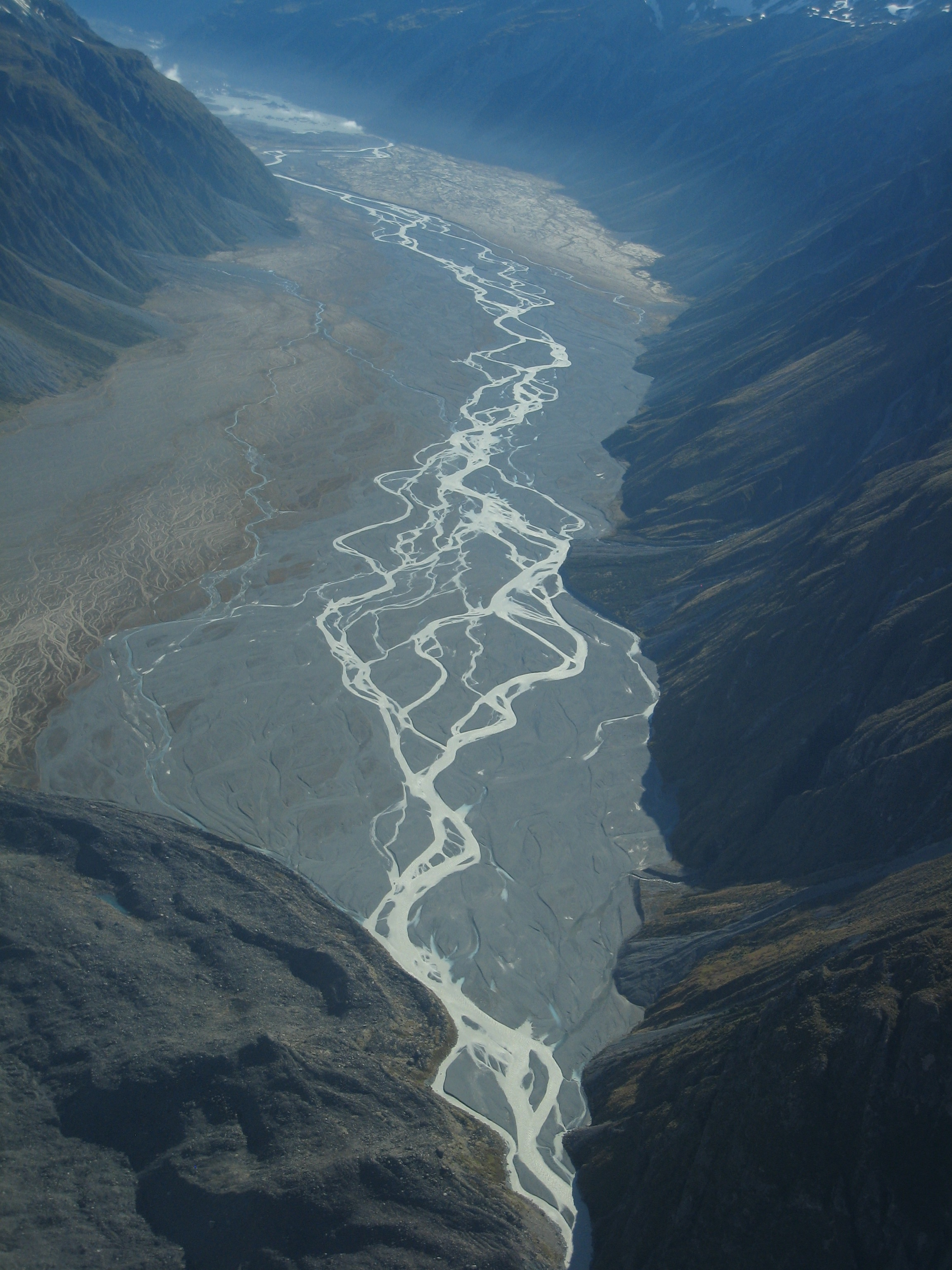
- Aerial view of the braided Murchison River
- Route of the Murchison River
- Mouth of the Murchison River Murchison River (New Zealand) (South Island)

Location
- Country: New Zealand

Physical characteristics
- Source
  - location: Murchison Glacier
  - coordinates: 43°36′55″S 170°19′07″E
- Mouth
  - location: Tasman Lake
  - coordinates: 43°54′18″S 170°10′30″E

Basin features
- Progression: Murchison River → Tasman Lake → Tasman River → Lake Pukaki → Pukaki River → Tekapo River → Lake Benmore → Lake Aviemore → Lake Waitaki → Waitaki River → Pacific Ocean

The Murchison River lies within the Aoraki / Mount Cook National Park in the South Island of New Zealand.

It is fed by the Murchison Glacier and flows into Tasman Lake, thus effectively feeding the Tasman River.
