= Hochstetter Dome =

Mountain in New Zealand

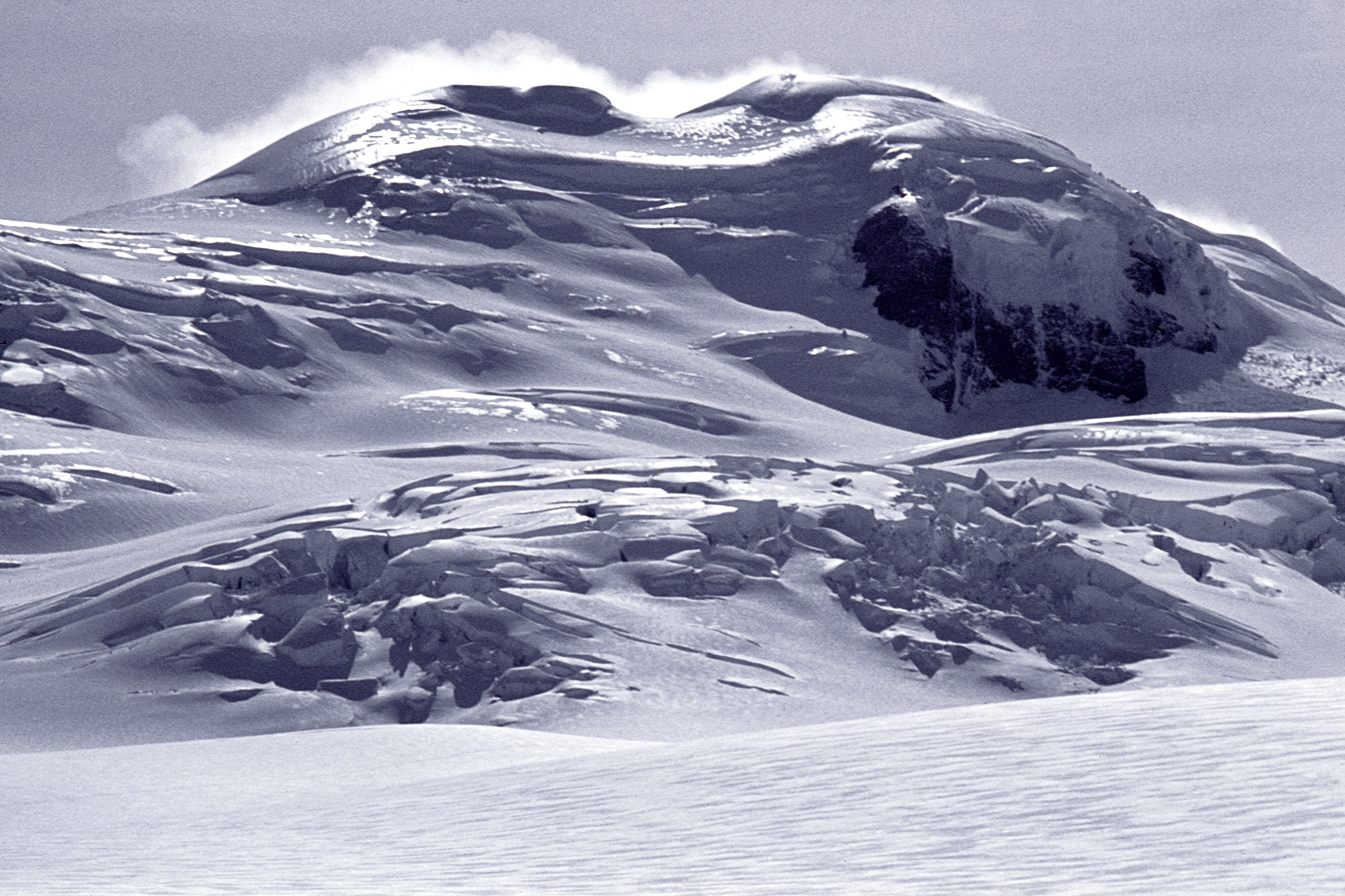
- West-southwest aspect

Highest point
- Elevation: 2,827 m (9,275 ft)
- Prominence: 392 m (1,286 ft)
- Isolation: 2.41 km (1.50 mi)
- Listing: New Zealand #16
- Coordinates: 43°30′09″S 170°20′57″E

Naming
- Etymology: Ferdinand von Hochstetter

Geography
- Location within New Zealand
- Interactive map of Hochstetter Dome
- Location: South Island
- Country: New Zealand
- Region: Canterbury / West Coast
- Protected area: Aoraki / Mount Cook National Park
- Parent range: Southern Alps
- Topo map: Topo50 BX16

Climbing
- First ascent: 1883

Hochstetter Dome is a 2,827-metre-elevation (9,275-foot) mountain in New Zealand.

== Description ==
Hochstetter Dome is set on the crest or Main Divide of the Southern Alps and is situated on the boundary shared by the West Coast and Canterbury Regions of South Island. This remote peak is located 19 kilometres (12 mi) northeast of Aoraki / Mount Cook on the boundary of Aoraki / Mount Cook National Park. It has a High Peak (2,827 m) and a Low Peak (2,810 m) which are set approximately 200 metres apart. Topographic relief is significant as the summit rises 1,627 metres (5,338 feet) above the Whymper Glacier in two kilometres. The head of the Tasman Glacier is on Hochstetter Dome. Precipitation runoff from the mountain drains south to the Tasman River and north into the headwaters of the Whataroa River. The nearest higher peak is Mount Walter, 2.57 kilometres to the west-northwest.

== History ==
This mountain's toponym has been officially approved by the New Zealand Geographic Board. The toponym was applied by Dr. Robert von Lendenfeld, who made the first ascent on 27 March 1883 with his wife Anna, and New Zealander Harry Dew. The peak is named after Ferdinand von Hochstetter (1829–1884), a German-Austrian geologist, who was appointed geologist on the Austrian Novara Expedition of 1857–1859 to New Zealand which produced the first geological map of New Zealand. The 1883 ascent of Hochstetter Dome represented the first successful alpine ascent to the summit of any major peak in New Zealand's central Southern Alps.

== Climbing ==
Climbing routes on Hochstetter Dome:

- Standard Traverse – Robert and Anna von Lendenfeld, Harry Dew – (1883)
- South Face – First ascent unknown
- North Face – Guy McKinnon (solo) – (2006)

== Climate ==
Based on the Köppen climate classification, Hochstetter Dome is located in a marine west coast (Cfb) climate zone, with a subpolar oceanic climate (Cfc) at the summit. Prevailing westerly winds blow moist air from the Tasman Sea onto the mountains, where the air is forced upward by the mountains (orographic lift), causing moisture to drop in the form of rain or snow. This climate supports the Whymper and Tasman glaciers surrounding the peak. The months of December through February offer the most favourable weather for viewing or climbing this peak.

== See also ==
- List of mountains of New Zealand by height
