= Tasman Glacier =

Glacier in New Zealand

- Haupapa / Tasman Glacier
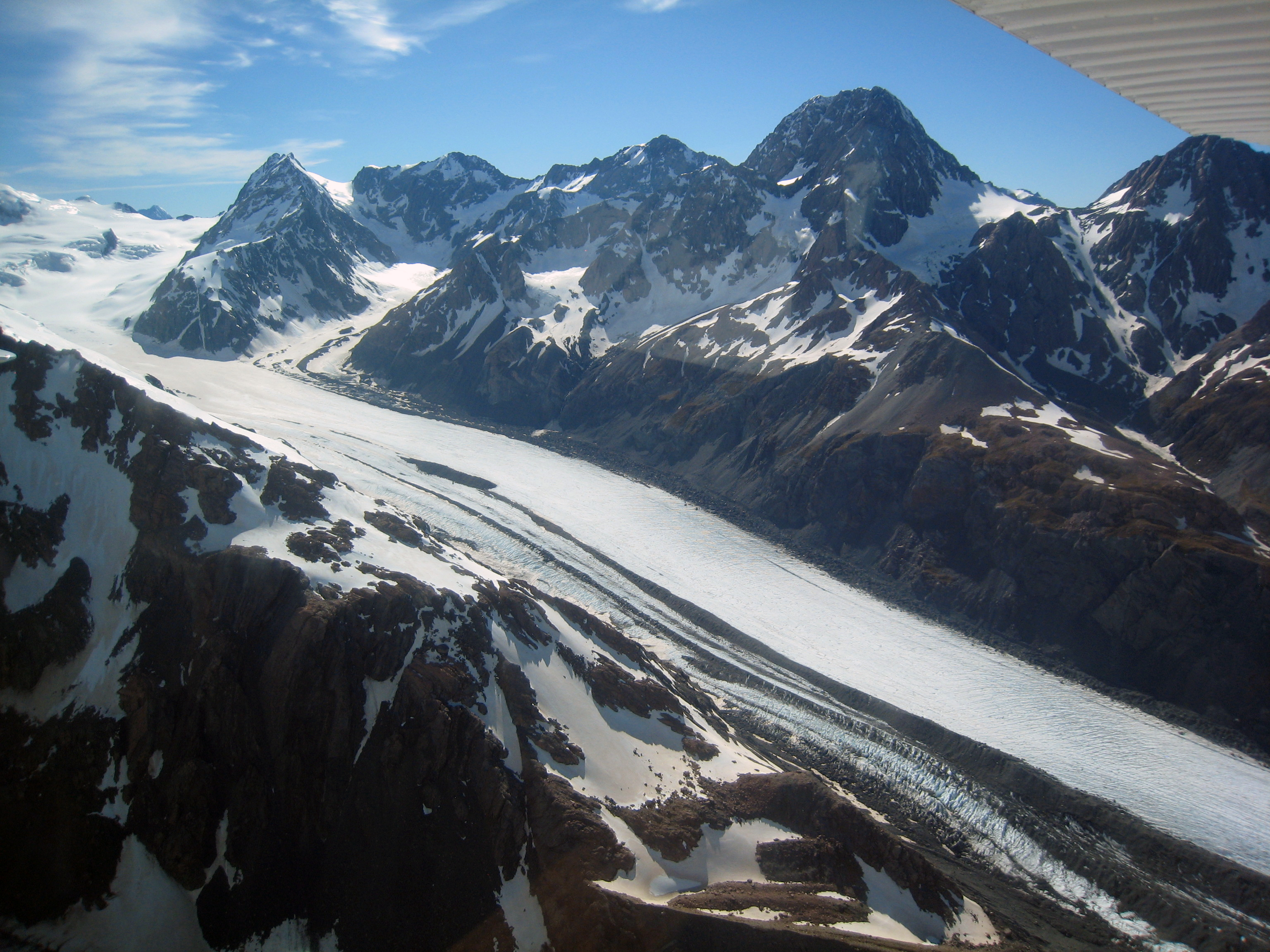
- Upper half of the Tasman Glacier
- Interactive map of Tasman Glacier
- Type: Mountain glacier
- Location: New Zealand
- Coordinates: 43°37′S 170°12′E
- Area: 101 km^{2} (39 sq mi)
- Length: 23.5 km (14.6 mi)
- Thickness: 600 m (2,000 ft)
- Terminus: Lake Tasman
- Status: Retreating

Tasman Glacier (officially Haupapa / Tasman Glacier) is the largest glacier in New Zealand, and one of several large glaciers which flow south and east towards the Mackenzie Basin from the Southern Alps in New Zealand's South Island.

== Geography ==
360-degree digital elevation model (DEM) animation of Tasman Glacier, illustrating its complex alpine topography, retreating snout, terminal lake, and the tributary Ball Glacier.

At 23.5 kilometres (14.6 mi) in length, Tasman Glacier is still New Zealand's longest glacier, despite shrinking considerably from the 1990s onwards. It is as much as 4 kilometres (2.5 mi) wide and 600 metres (2,000 ft) thick, and lies entirely within the borders of Aoraki / Mount Cook National Park. The glacier covers an area of 101 square kilometres (39 sq mi) and starts at a height of 3,000 metres (9,800 ft) above sea level. Snowfall during the winter and spring seasons may accumulate up to 50 metres (160 ft). After the summer melt, 7 metres (23 ft) may remain in the high altitude glacier head.

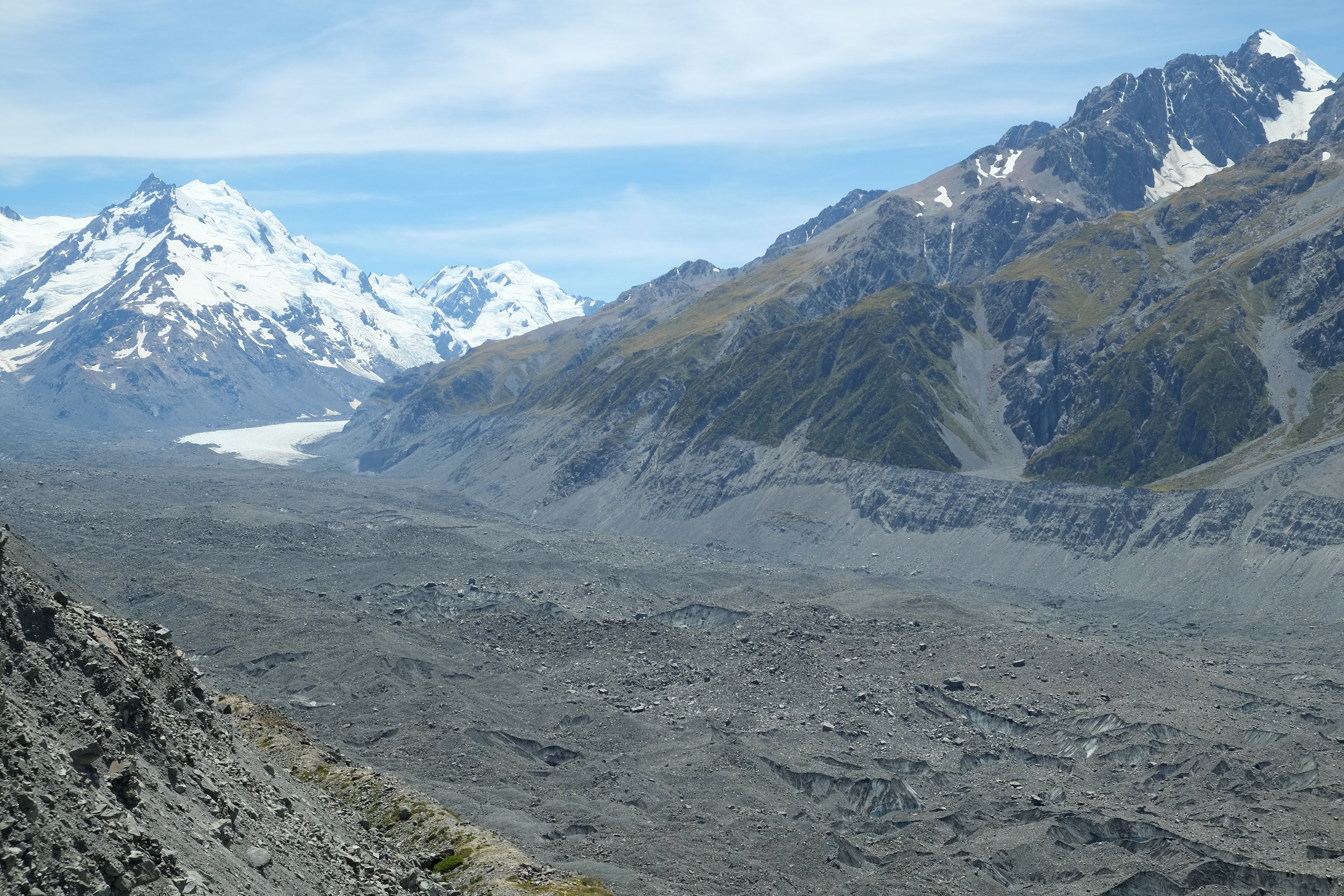
Lower Tasman Glacier

The Tasman flows south west from Hochstetter Dome and Mount Elie De Beaumont alongside the southern slopes of The Minarets and south along the eastern flank of New Zealand's two highest mountains, Mount Tasman and its higher southern neighbour Aoraki / Mount Cook.

Although its upper reaches are snow-covered, rocks carried by the glacier are exposed by ablation along its course, and the lower glacier is entirely rock-covered. The rock cover helps insulate the ice from the sunlight and slows down the melting process. Tributaries in the lower parts are the Rudolf Glacier, Forrest Ross Glacier, named after Forrestina Ross), Kaufmann Glacier, Haast Glacier, Hochstetter Glacier, and Ball Glacier.

The glacial terminal lake is met by the meltwater of the Murchison Glacier, which approaches from the northeast and flows alongside the Tasman Glacier outside the moraine wall. The waters of Tasman Lake flow into the Tasman River and flow south joining the Hooker River draining the proglacial lakes on the Hooker and Mueller Glaciers. The Tasman River exhibits a braided characteristic, and flows south into Lake Pukaki. They eventually flow into the Waitaki River and to the Pacific Ocean north of Oamaru.

== Recent retreat ==
Left to right, the Mueller, Hooker and Tasman Glaciers in the Southern Alps, showing major retreat in the ~10 years circa 1990 to 2000. Notice the larger terminal lakes, the retreat of the white ice (ice free of moraine cover, high up on the glaciers), and (more subtly) the increase in height of the moraine walls due to ice thinning.

The glacier remained at a constant 28 km (17 mi) in length for all of its recorded history in the 20th century before starting its current period of rapid melting in the 1990s. Between 2000 and 2008 alone, the glacier terminus receded 3.7 km. From the 1990s to 2017, the terminus had retreated about 180 metres (590 ft) a year on average. In 2008, experts at Massey University advised the glacier could be gone in 20 years, saying the glacier was in a period of faster retreat where the rate of retreat was calculated to be between 477 to 822 metres (1,565 to 2,697 ft) each year. In 1973 Tasman Glacier had no terminal lake and by 2008 Tasman Lake was 7 kilometres (4.3 mi) long, 2 kilometres (1.2 mi) wide, and 245 metres (804 ft) deep.

A large calving event was possibly triggered, or at least contributed to, by the 2011 Christchurch earthquake on 22 February 2011. On this day 30 to 40 million metric tons (33 to 44 million short tons) of ice dropped from the terminal face of the Tasman Glacier and fell into the Tasman Lake. Boats were hit with tsunami waves of up to 3.5 metres (11 ft) as the ice fell into the Tasman Lake under the glacier. Similar events in the past have been attributed to buoyancy effects, a result of high basal water pressures and increased lake level following heavy rainfall events.

== Access and tourism ==
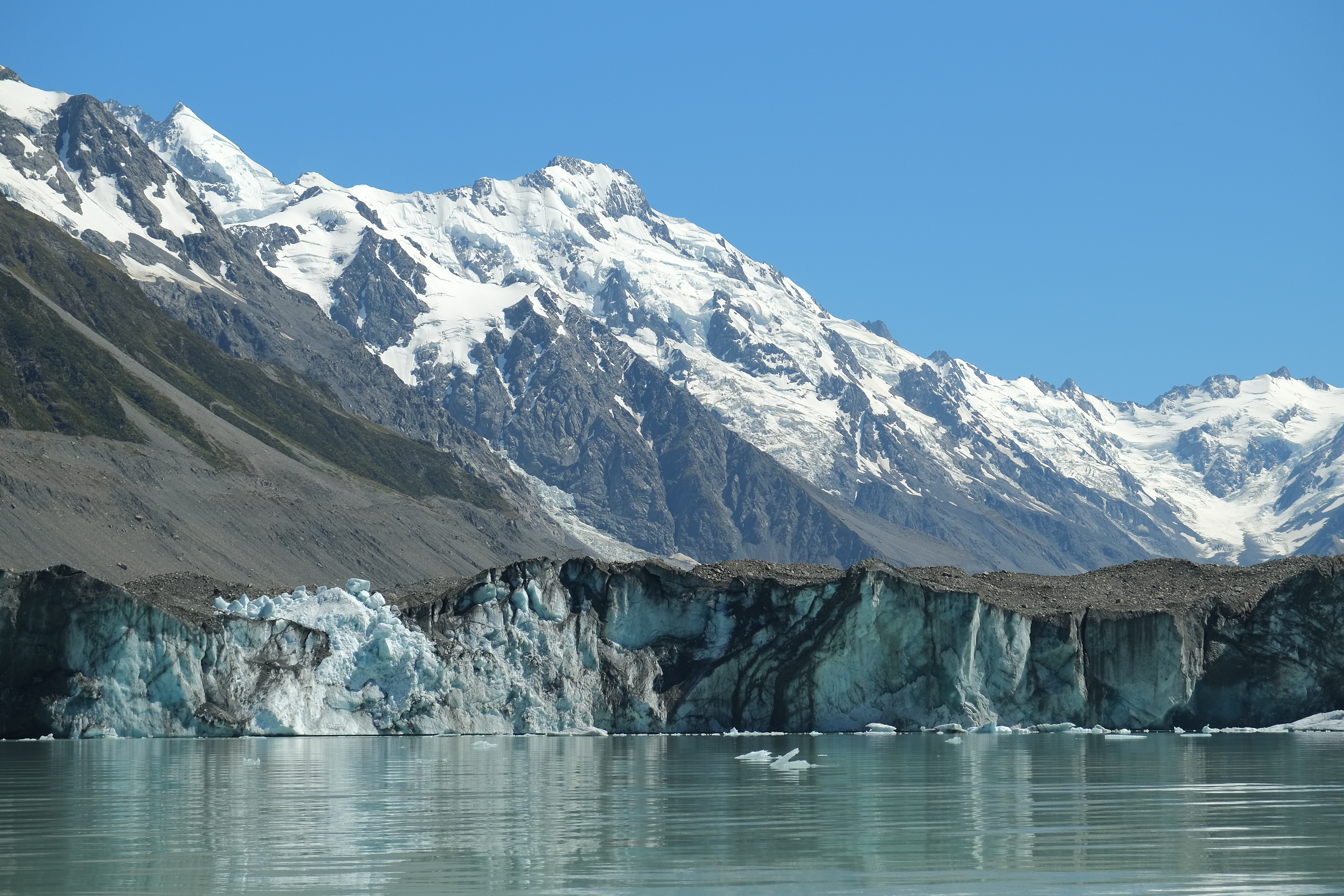
Tasman Glacier terminal face

Tasman Glacier has a long history of tourism, with heli skiing tours offered on the upper glacier since the early 1970s. The tributary Ball Glacier was also popular for skiing, with national championships being held there in the 1930s. It has since diminished too far to be safely accessed. Similarly, Tasman Glacier's significant ice loss over the past decades has impacted tourism, with an increasing number of crevasses being exposed and not filled in by snow any more, requiring guided tours to avoid these areas, and restricting the heli skiing season to July, August and September.

The proglacial Tasman Lake is a popular destination for boat tours among the icebergs often floating in the lake. Boats maintain a minimum distance of 500 m (1,640.4 ft) to the approximately 30 m (98 ft) tall terminal face of Tasman Glacier for safety reasons.

The Ball Shelter Track, part of the Ball Hut Route, leads along the western side of the glacier, separated from Tasman Lake by a tall moraine wall until about 6 kilometres in, where it climbs high enough for the view to open up. At that point, the rock-covered lower Tasman Glacier in the valley between the moraine walls is 2.5 km (1.6 mi) wide.

== See also ==
- Glaciers of New Zealand
- List of glaciers
- Retreat of glaciers since 1850 – Oceania
