= State Highway 80 (New Zealand) =

Road in New Zealand

State Highway 80

Route information
- Maintained by NZ Transport Agency Waka Kotahi
- Length: 54.7 km (34.0 mi)

Major junctions
- South end: SH 8 (Tekapo Twizel Road) at Lake Pukaki
- North end: Terrace Road/Bowen Drive at Mount Cook Village

Location
- Country: New Zealand
- Primary destinations: Glentanner

Highway system
- New Zealand state highways; Motorways and expressways; List
← SH 79	→ SH 82

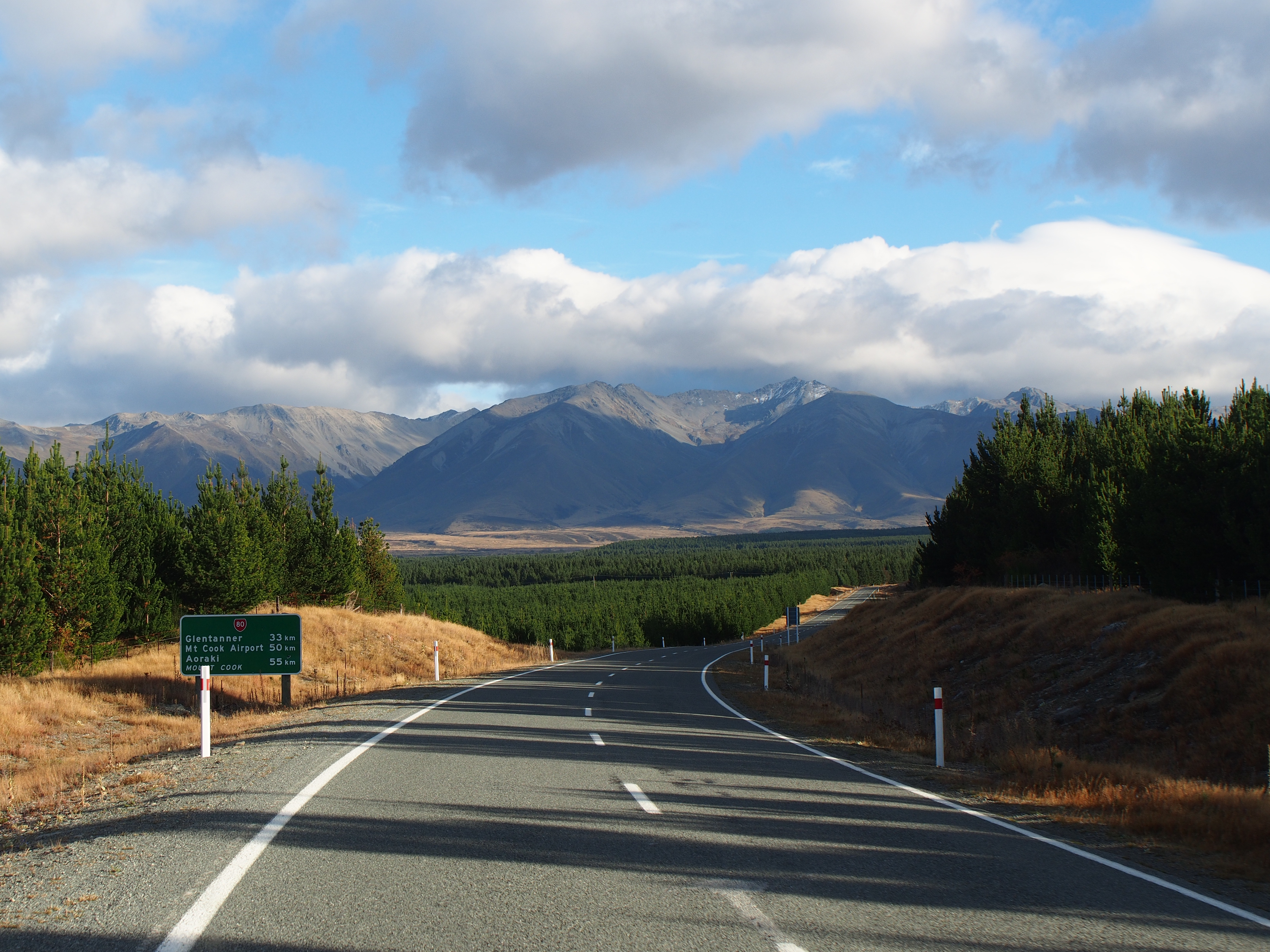
Mount Cook Road

State Highway 80 (SH 80) is a South Island state highway in New Zealand. Known as Mount Cook Road, it is a road which is a popular tourist route between the settlements of Twizel and Mount Cook Village. About 55 kilometres in length, it is mostly two lane, with a few single-lane bridges. Tourists travelling between Christchurch and Queenstown often deviate here and travel to New Zealand's highest mountain Aoraki / Mount Cook.

== Route ==
Since designation, this is the route SH 80 takes.

For the first 31 km of the road, SH 80 runs in a northerly direction parallel with the banks of Lake Pukaki to the right and the Mackenzie Basin to the left. About 10 kilometres along the road, the basin is superseded by the Ben Ohau Range. After a further 20 kilometres, the road passes the head of Lake Pukaki where it changes name to the Tasman River. The highway eventually terminates just east of Mount Cook Village after a further 24 kilometres.

== See also ==
- List of New Zealand state highways
