= Jollie River =

Coordinates: 43°53′S 170°10′E

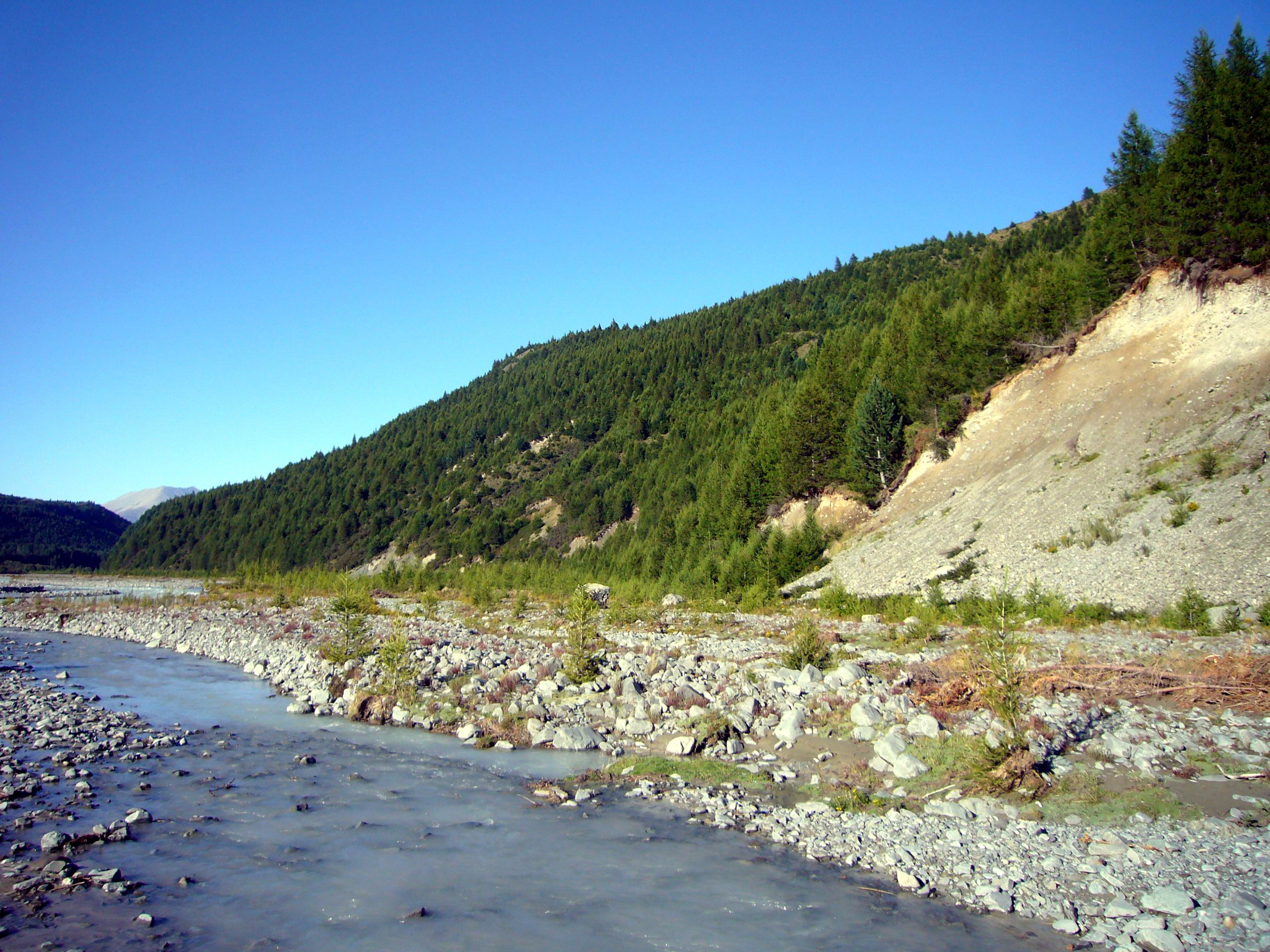
- Wilding conifers, predominantly European Larch, on the Jollie River.

Location
- Country: New Zealand

Physical characteristics
- Source
  - location: Liebig Range
- Mouth
  - location: Tasman River
- Length: 25 km (16 mi)

The Jollie River is a river of New Zealand's Southern Alps. It flows an almost straight course from its source in the Liebig Range 15 kilometres (9 mi) east of Aoraki / Mount Cook, flowing into the Tasman River 5 kilometres (3 mi) from the latter's outflow into Lake Pukaki.

== See also ==
- List of rivers of New Zealand
