= Lake Pukaki =

Lake in Canterbury Region, New Zealand

- Māori: Pūkaki
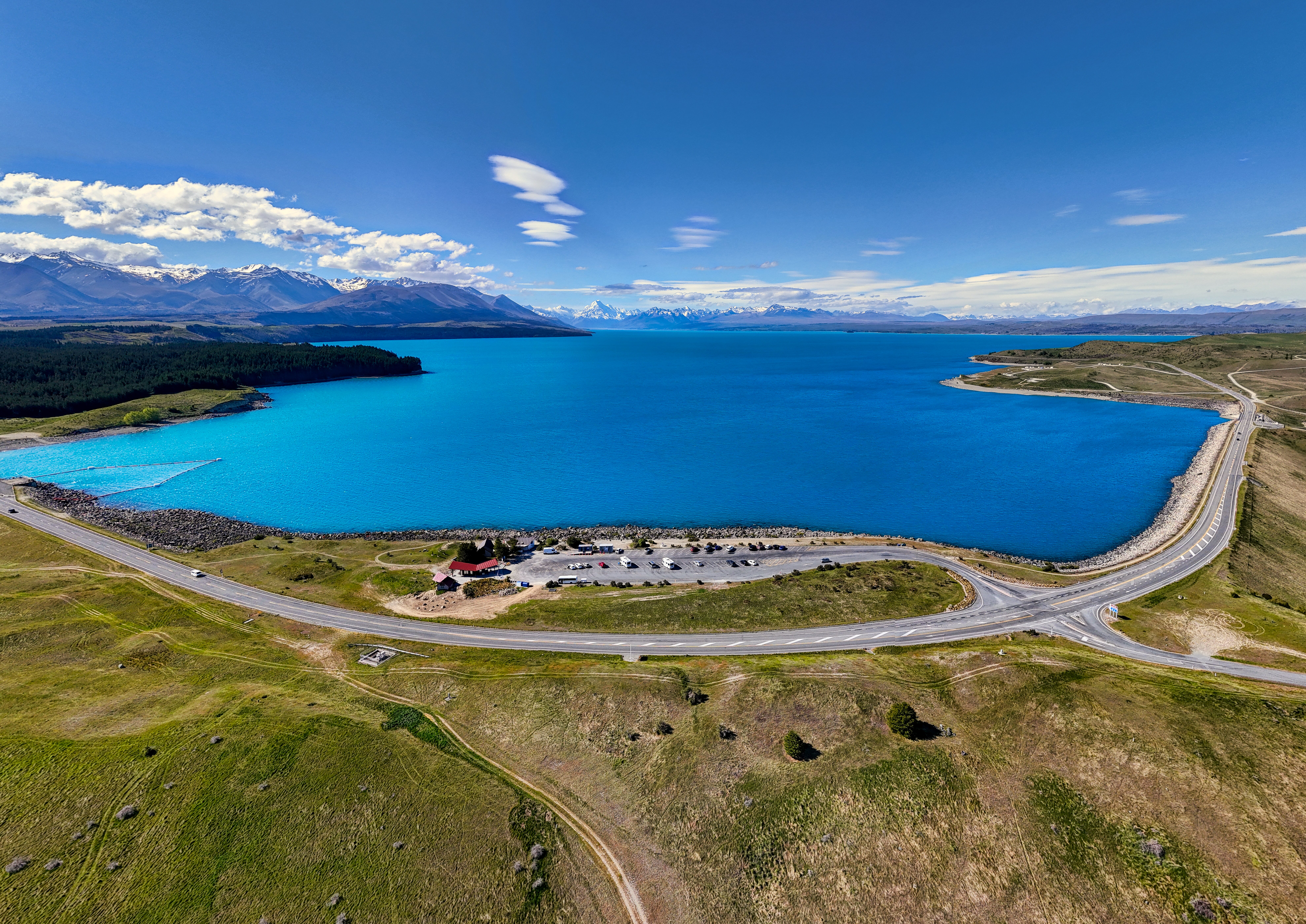
- Lake Pukaki

- Location within New Zealand
- Interactive map of Lake Pukaki
- Location: Mackenzie District, Canterbury region, South Island
- Coordinates: 44°07′S 170°10′E
- Primary inflows: Tasman River
- Primary outflows: Pukaki River
- Catchment area: 1,413 km^{2} (546 sq mi)
- Basin countries: New Zealand
- Surface area: 178.7 km^{2} (69.0 sq mi)
- Average depth: 47 m (154 ft)
- Max. depth: 70 m (230 ft)
- Water volume: 4.66 km^{3} (3,780,000 acre⋅ft)
- Surface elevation: 518.2 to 532 m (1,700 to 1,745 ft)
- Frozen: never (winter air temperatures can reach as low as −20 °C (−4 °F) though)
- Islands: Morgans Island
- Settlements: Twizel

Lake Pukaki (Māori: Pūkaki) is the largest of three roughly parallel alpine lakes running north–south along the northern edge of the Mackenzie Basin on New Zealand's South Island. The others are Lakes Tekapo and Ōhau. All three lakes were formed when the terminal moraines of receding glaciers blocked their respective valleys, forming moraine-dammed lakes. The Alps2Ocean mountain bike trail follows the edge of Lake Pukaki for part of its length.

== Geography ==
The glacial feed to the lakes gives them a distinctive blue colour, created by glacial flour, the extremely finely ground rock particles from the glaciers. Lake Pukaki covers an area of 178.7 km^{2} (69.0 sq mi), and the surface elevation of the lake normally ranges from 518.2 to 532 metres (1,700 to 1,745 ft) above sea level.

The lake is fed at its northern end by the braided Tasman River, which has its source in the Tasman and Hooker Glaciers, close to Aoraki / Mount Cook. To the west of Lake Pukaki lies the Ben Ohau mountain range with Ben Dhu (1,607 metres; 5,272 ft) and Betty Hill (1,601 metres; 5,253 ft) closest to the lake. On the eastern side there is some farmland on the flatter contours between Lake Pukaki and Lake Tekapo.

Good views of the taller mountains in Aoraki / Mount Cook National Park, 70 kilometres (43 mi) to the north can be had from the southern shore of the lake.

== Tahr statue ==
There is a life size bronze statue of a Himalayan tahr standing upon a boulder near the visitor centre on the southern shores of Lake Pukaki. This was the site of a protest by hunters fighting against the Department of Conservation's controversial tahr culling programme in 2020.

== Hydroelectricity ==
The lake is now part of the Waitaki hydroelectric scheme. The lake's original outflow was at its southern end, into the Pukaki River. The outflow has been dammed, and canals carry water from Lake Pukaki and Lake Ōhau through the Ōhau A power station to Lake Ruataniwha.

Pukaki is also fed by the waters of Lake Tekapo, which are diverted through a canal to a power station on Pukaki's eastern shore (Tekapo B station). The lake has been raised twice to increase storage capacity (by 9 metres (30 ft) in 1952, and 37 metres (121 ft) in 1976), submerging Five Pound Note Island, which once appeared on New Zealand's five pound note. The current lake has an operating range of 13.8 metres (45 ft) (the level within which it can be artificially raised or lowered), giving it an energy storage capacity of 1,595 GWh. Along with Lake Tekapo's 770 GWh storage, it provides over half New Zealand's hydroelectricity storage capacity. In September 2012, Environment Canterbury approved a change in conditions of Meridian Energy's resource consent controlling the water levels and flows of Lake Pukaki. The change allows Meridian to lower the lake a further five metres (16 ft) from the minimum level of 518 metres (1,699 ft) above sea level in the event of an energy crisis.

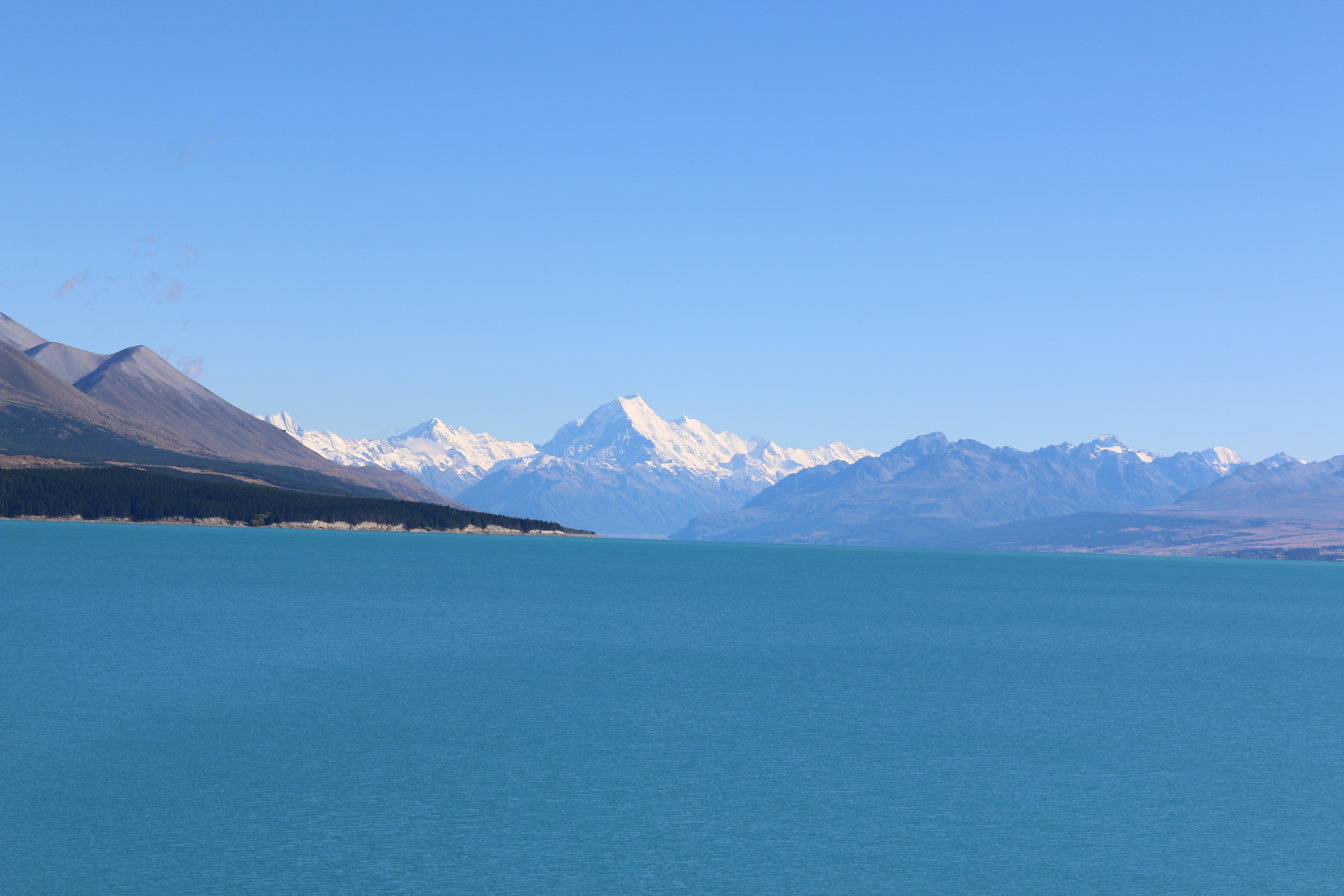
Lake Pukaki, looking towards Mount Cook, in summer

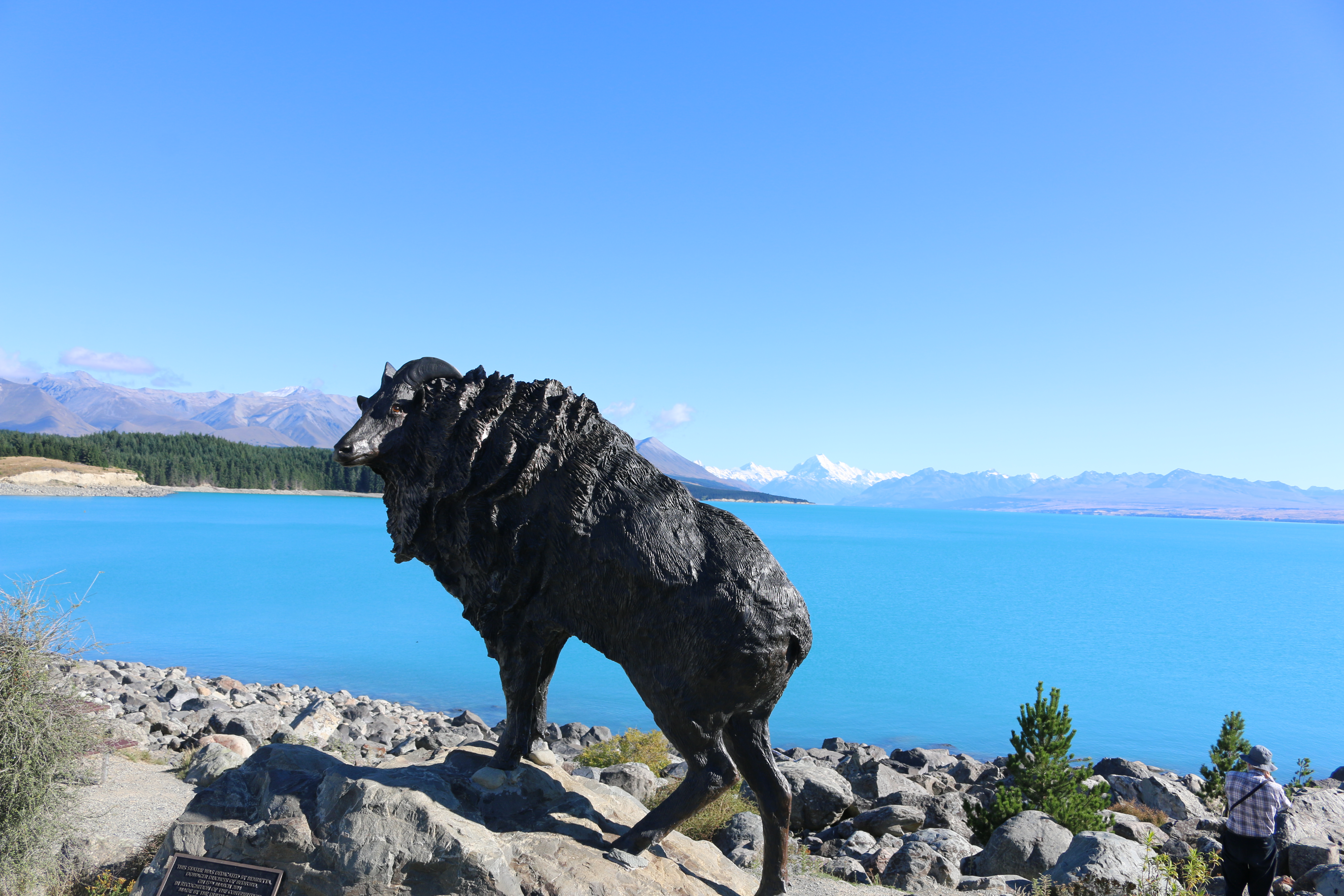
Statue of the Himalayan Tahr, introduced to New Zealand in 1904

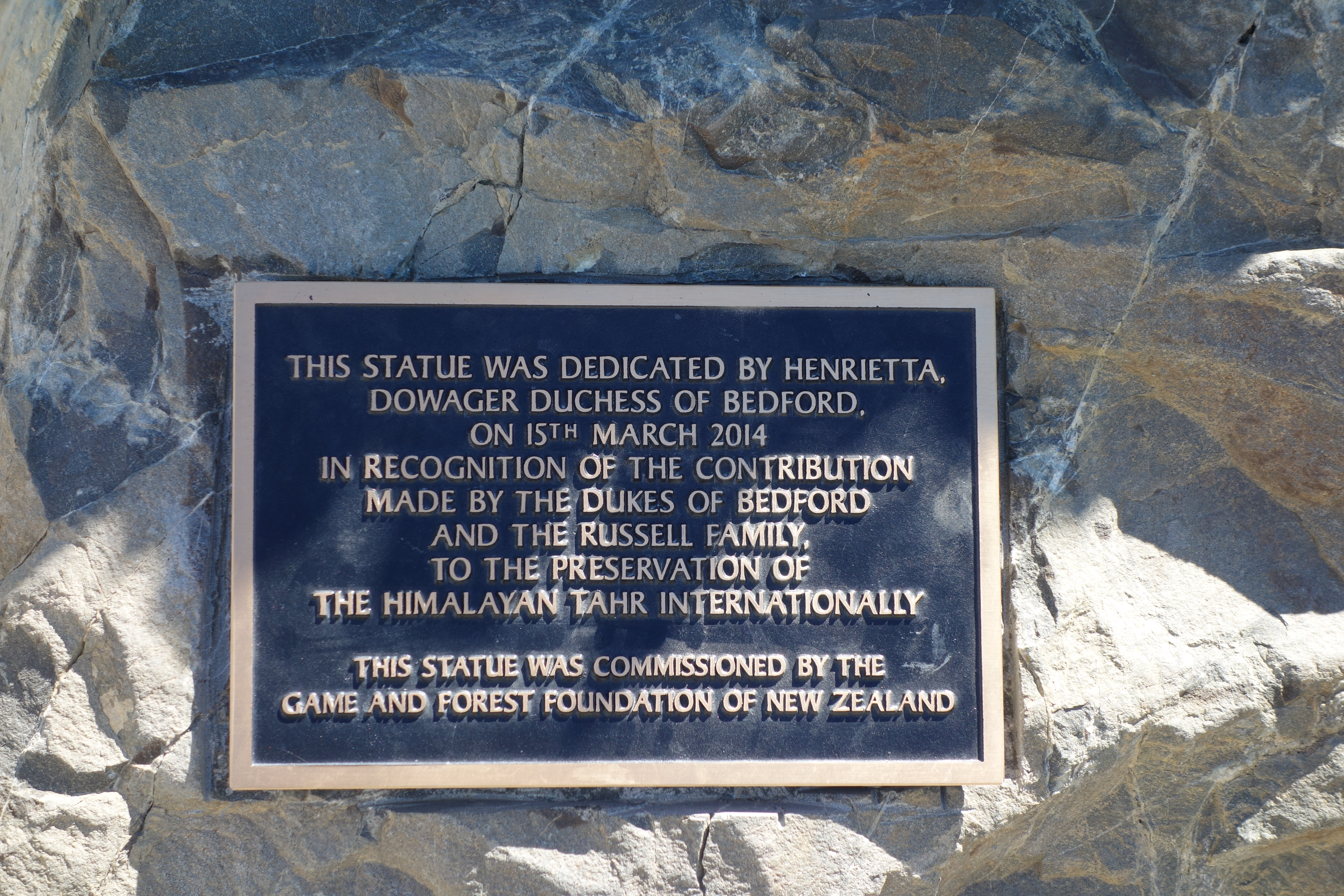
Plaque providing details about the introduction of the tahr

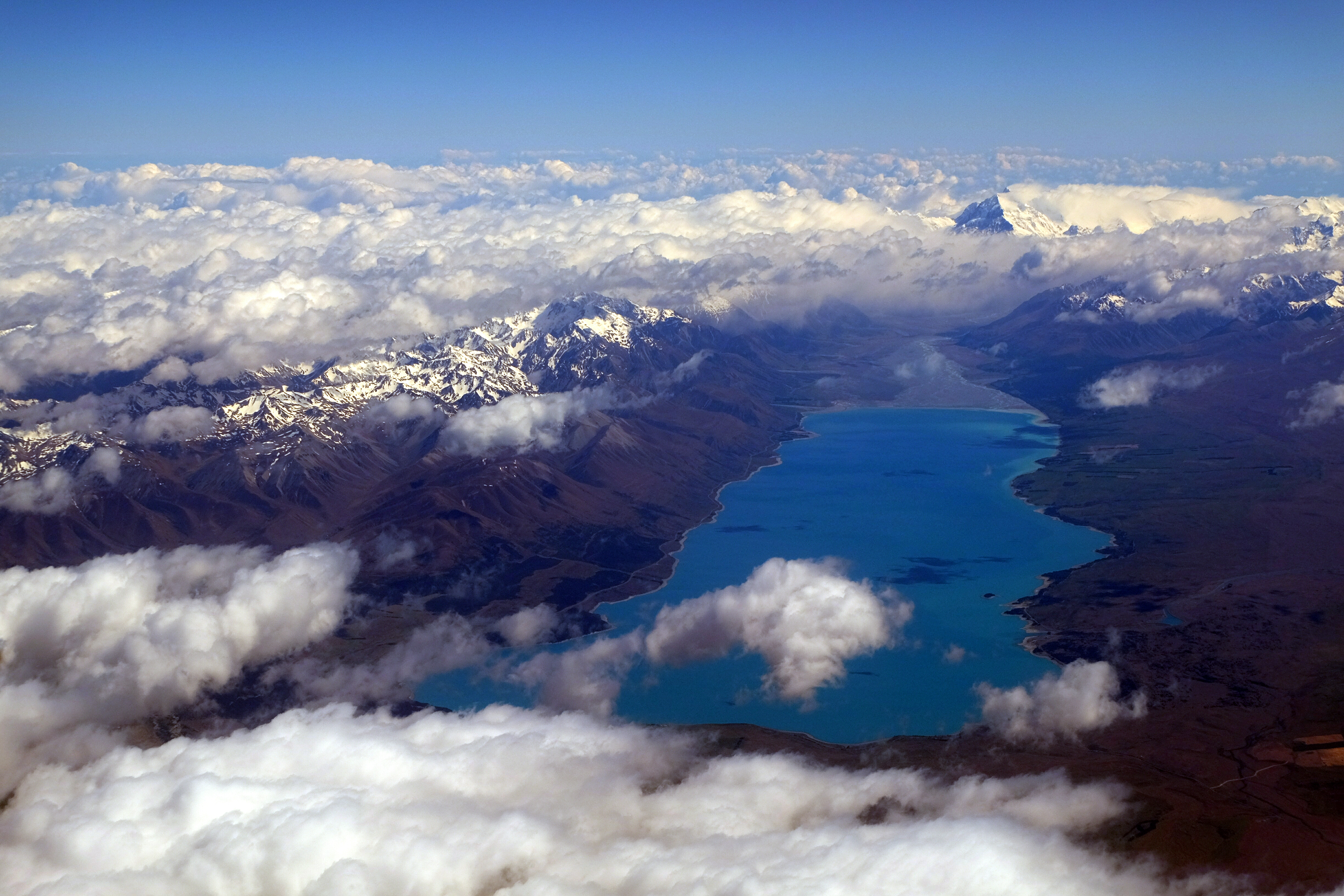
Aerial view of Lake Pukaki (2015)

== Nearby settlements ==
There was previously a seasonal Ngāi Tahu food-gathering settlement on the southern shore of Lake Pukaki called Punatahu.

The closest town to Lake Pukaki is Twizel, 7 kilometres (4.3 mi) to the south of the lake and Tekapo is 47 km (32 minutes drive) to the northeast. State Highway 8 skirts the southern end of the lake, and State Highway 80 runs north along the length of its western shore, to Mount Cook Village in the Aoraki / Mount Cook National Park.

The nearby Pukaki Scientific Reserve is home to the Nationally Endangered moth species Izatha psychra.

== The £5 banknote ==
The second series of New Zealand banknotes, introduced by the Reserve Bank in 1940 and remaining in circulation until decimalisation in 1967, featured Lake Pūkaki on the £5 note. The scene, of now-submerged Te Kohai Island with a background of the Southern Alps, became so well known that the island was known as "Five Pound Note Island", and a 1964 memoir by Evelyn Hosken about living in the Pukaki area was titled Life on a Five Pound Note. The engraved image was based on an autumn 1934 photograph by Ashburton photographer Bobbie Barwell. She had passed the photograph on to Ashburton MP Horace Herring, who thought it might be useful for publicity purposes, and was surprised to discover an engraving based on the top half of her image on the £5 note.

A 1934 Bobbie Barwell photo of Te Kohai Island, Lake Pukaki, later appeared on the 1940 £5 note.

== Road safety ==
State Highway 8 runs along the edge of Lake Pukaki. Numerous crashes have occurred here as drivers have come around a blind corner, seen Lake Pukaki and wanted to stop at an unsafe location to enjoy the view.

== 2020 fire ==
A significant scrub fire burnt on the shores of Lake Pukaki in August 2020. Both State Highway 8 and SH80 were closed. Firefighters fought the fire with 14 monsoon bucket equipped helicopters, two fixed-wing aircraft, and 10 fire engines. The fire destroyed 3500 hectares and took 12 days to put out. $1 million was spent fighting it. Environmentalists believe that the spread of wilding pines in the Mackenzie District along with the dry conditions allowed the scrub fire to become so destructive.

== Pukaki Scientific Reserve ==
The Pukaki Scientific Reserve is a small scientific reserve of 32 hectares (79 acres) located on the western side of Lake Pukaki next to the Mount Cook road. The Pukaki Scientific Reserve is home to the endangered Izatha psychra moth. The Lake Pukaki area is also home to the "Data Deficient" fly species Anabarhynchus albipennis.

== Climate ==
Climate data for Lake Pukaki, elevation 556 m (1,824 ft), (1971–2000)
Month	Jan	Feb	Mar	Apr	May	Jun	Jul	Aug	Sep	Oct	Nov	Dec	Year
Mean daily maximum °C (°F)	22.0 (71.6)	22.4 (72.3)	19.3 (66.7)	15.3 (59.5)	10.9 (51.6)	6.5 (43.7)	6.2 (43.2)	8.5 (47.3)	12.3 (54.1)	15.0 (59.0)	17.4 (63.3)	19.7 (67.5)	14.6 (58.3)
Daily mean °C (°F)	15.9 (60.6)	16.0 (60.8)	13.6 (56.5)	10.2 (50.4)	6.4 (43.5)	2.7 (36.9)	2.3 (36.1)	4.1 (39.4)	7.3 (45.1)	9.8 (49.6)	11.9 (53.4)	14.0 (57.2)	9.5 (49.1)
Mean daily minimum °C (°F)	9.7 (49.5)	9.6 (49.3)	7.9 (46.2)	5.2 (41.4)	1.9 (35.4)	−1.1 (30.0)	−1.7 (28.9)	−0.3 (31.5)	2.2 (36.0)	4.5 (40.1)	6.3 (43.3)	8.3 (46.9)	4.4 (39.9)
Average rainfall mm (inches)	60.0 (2.36)	41.0 (1.61)	60.0 (2.36)	58.0 (2.28)	56.0 (2.20)	45.0 (1.77)	51.0 (2.01)	43.0 (1.69)	64.0 (2.52)	65.0 (2.56)	72.0 (2.83)	58.0 (2.28)	673 (26.47)
Source: CliFlo (rain 1951–1980)
