= Murchison Glacier =

Glacier in the Southern Alps, New Zealand

Coordinates: 43°35′S 170°22′E

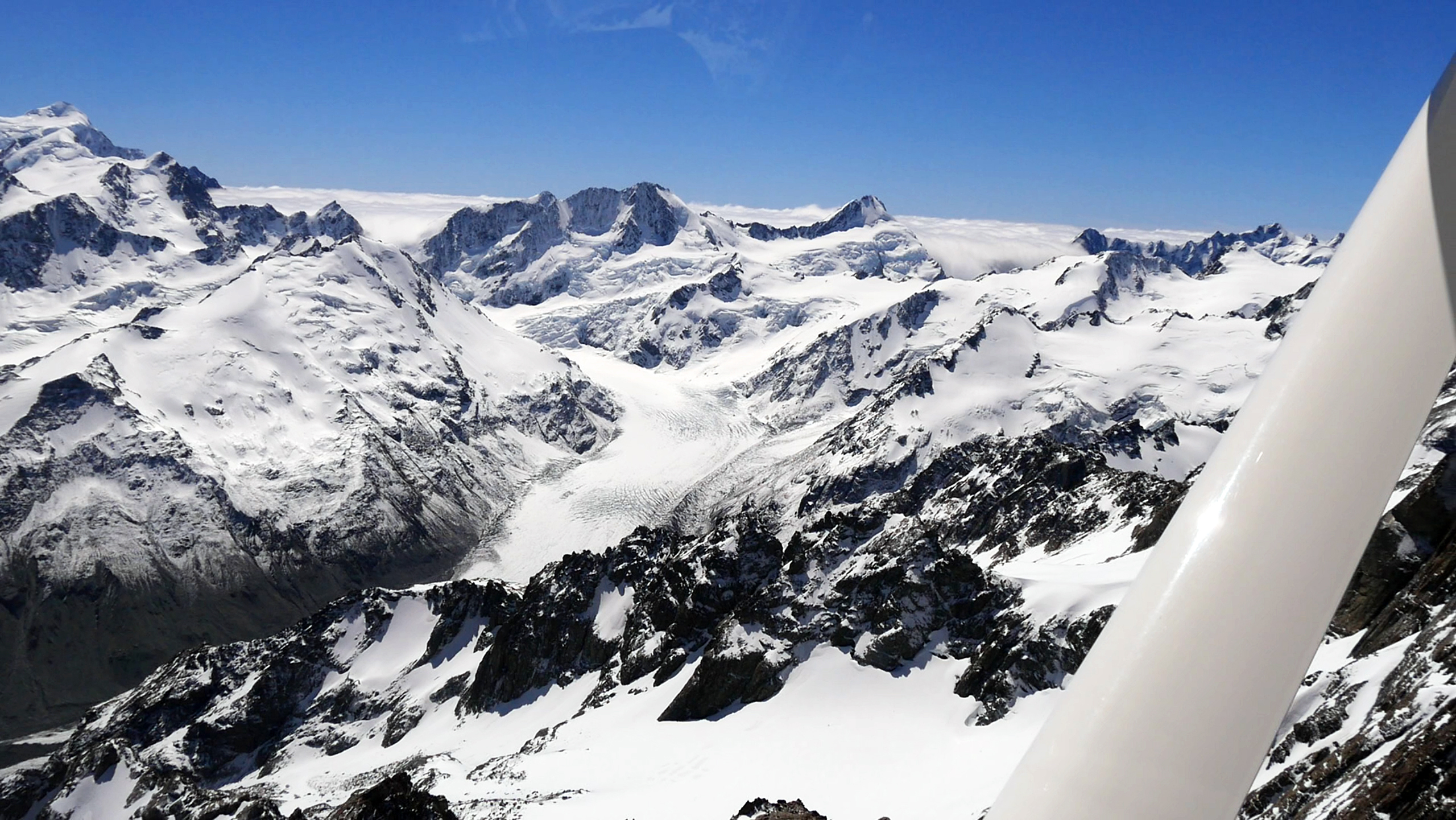
Upper reach of the Murchison Glacier (centre)

The Murchison Glacier is an 18-kilometre (11 mi) long glacier flowing through Aoraki / Mount Cook National Park in the South Island of New Zealand. Lying to the east of the Malte Brun range and west of the Liebig Range, high in the Southern Alps, it flows from the Tasman Saddle at 2,435 m mostly southwestwards to around 1,110 m. The Murchison River, which takes its meltwater, flows under the larger Tasman Glacier to the south.

The Murchison Glacier is named after Roderick Murchison, one of the founders of the Royal Geographical Society.

== See also ==
- List of glaciers in New Zealand
