= Mount Cook Village =

Settlement in Canterbury, New Zealand

- Town
- Aoraki / Mount Cook
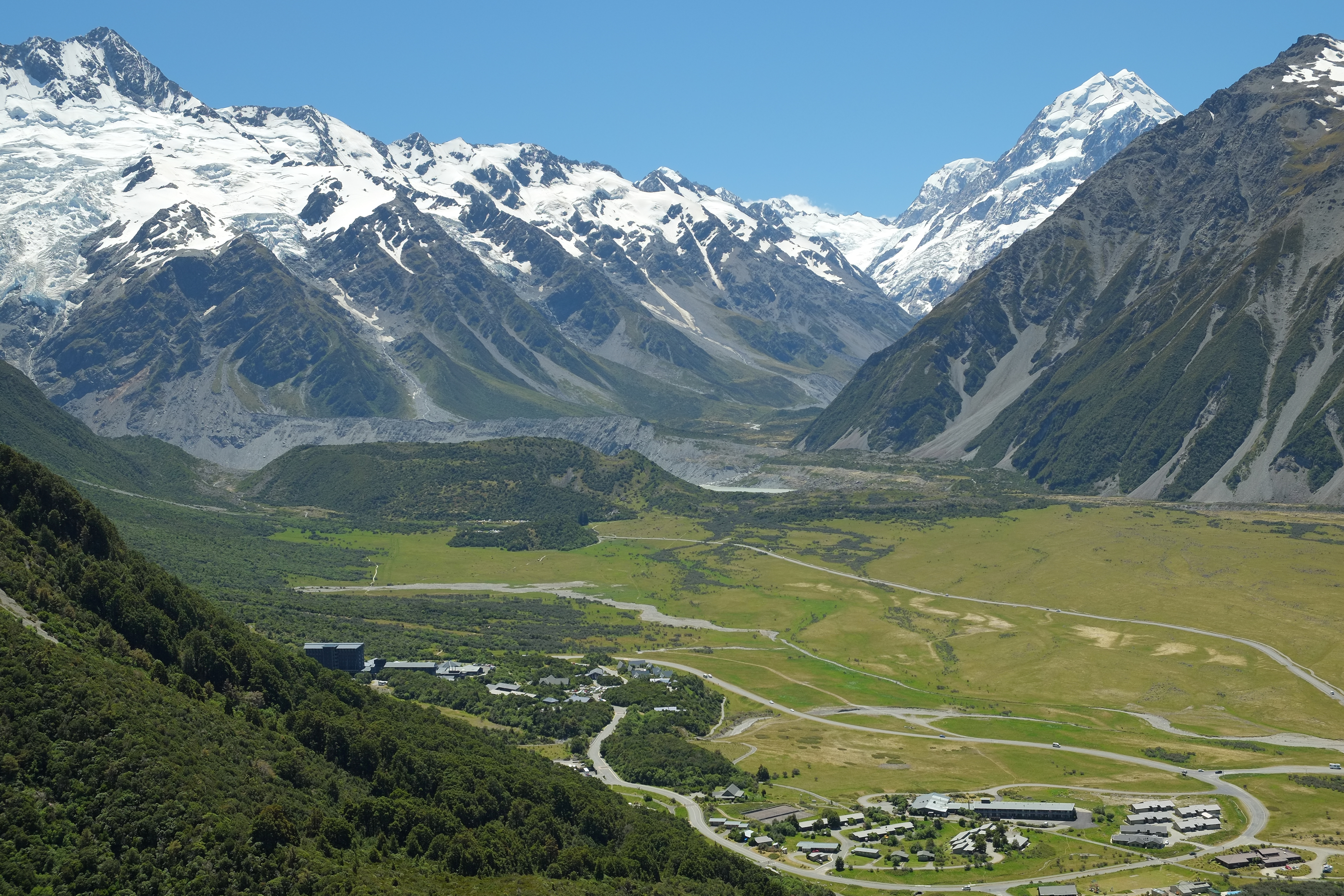
- Mount Cook Village down below in Hooker Valley, The Hermitage on the left, lodge and motel complex on the bottom right
- Interactive map of Mount Cook Village
- Coordinates: 43°44′0″S 170°5′44″E
- Country: New Zealand
- Island: South Island
- Region: Canterbury
- Territorial Authority: Mackenzie District
- Ward: Pukaki Ward
- Community: Twizel Community
- Electorates: Waitaki; Te Tai Tonga (Māori)

Government
  - Territorial authority: Mackenzie District Council
  - Regional council: Environment Canterbury
  - Mayor of Mackenzie: Scott Aronsen
  - Waitaki MP: Miles Anderson
  - Te Tai Tonga MP: Tākuta Ferris

Area
  - Total: 4.26 km^{2} (1.64 sq mi)
- Elevation: 750 m (2,460 ft)

Population (June 2025)
  - Total: 160
  - Density: 38/km^{2} (97/sq mi)

Mount Cook Village, officially Aoraki / Mount Cook, (Note: The town’s official name, as it was changed in 1998, is 'Aoraki/Mount Cook', without spaces between names. It is expected that the New Zealand Geographic Board will change the name to include spaces around the slash in future.) is located within New Zealand's Aoraki / Mount Cook National Park at the end of State Highway 80, 15 kilometres (9.3 mi) south of the summit of the country's highest mountain, also called Aoraki / Mount Cook, in the Southern Alps.

Because it is situated inside a national park, it is not possible to own property in Mount Cook Village; however, because of the year-round operation of the hotel and motels, the village has a small permanent population of around 250.

All buildings and facilities operate on concessions and leases from the government. The village has no grocery stores apart from a small in-hotel convenience store. The nearest supermarket is 65 kilometres (40 mi) away in Twizel, the closest town. There is a self-service petrol pump behind the hotel complex; however, the fuel price reflects the remote location.

Mount Cook Village operates a small school with a roll as low as a dozen children, the only school in New Zealand inside a national park.

== History ==
The first building at the location of Mount Cook Village was the second Hermitage hotel, built in 1913 and opened in 1914; however, that building burned to the ground in 1957 and was replaced in 1958 by what later became the current hotel.

The 1960s and 1970s saw significant extensions to the hotel and Mount Cook Village, including water mains, sewerage treatment, local streets, and the sealing of State Highway 80, which greatly improved access. A local fire brigade was established in 1976.

The official name of the settlement was amended to a dual name, Aoraki / Mount Cook, by the Ngāi Tahu Claims Settlement Act 1998.

== Demographics ==
Mount Cook Village is described by Statistics New Zealand as a rural settlement, and covers 4.26 km^{2} (1.64 sq mi). It had an estimated population of 160 as of June 2025, with a population density of 38 people per km^{2}. It is part of the Mackenzie Lakes statistical area.

Historical population
Year	Pop.	±% p.a.
2006	210	—
2013	201	−0.62%
2018	213	+1.17%
2023	150	−6.77%
The 2006 population is for a larger area of 9.68 km^{2}. Source:

Mt Cook Village had a population of 150 in the 2023 New Zealand census, a decrease of 63 people (−29.6%) since the 2018 census, and a decrease of 51 people (−25.4%) since the 2013 census. There were 84 males and 63 females in 117 dwellings. 4.0% of people identified as LGBTIQ+. The median age was 30.9 years (compared with 38.1 years nationally). There were 6 people (4.0%) aged under 15 years, 63 (42.0%) aged 15 to 29, 69 (46.0%) aged 30 to 64, and 9 (6.0%) aged 65 or older.

People could identify as more than one ethnicity. The results were 40.0% European (Pākehā); 2.0% Māori; 10.0% Pasifika; 34.0% Asian; 16.0% Middle Eastern, Latin American and African New Zealanders (MELAA); and 6.0% other, which includes people giving their ethnicity as "New Zealander". English was spoken by 100.0%, and other languages by 34.0%. The percentage of people born overseas was 72.0, compared with 28.8% nationally.

Religious affiliations were 28.0% Christian, 4.0% Hindu, 6.0% Islam, and 10.0% Buddhist. People who answered that they had no religion were 42.0%, and 8.0% of people did not answer the census question.

Of those at least 15 years old, 39 (27.1%) people had a bachelor's or higher degree, 54 (37.5%) had a post-high school certificate or diploma, and 51 (35.4%) people exclusively held high school qualifications. The median income was $28,600, compared with $41,500 nationally. The employment status of those at least 15 was 117 (81.2%) full-time, 9 (6.2%) part-time, and 3 (2.1%) unemployed.

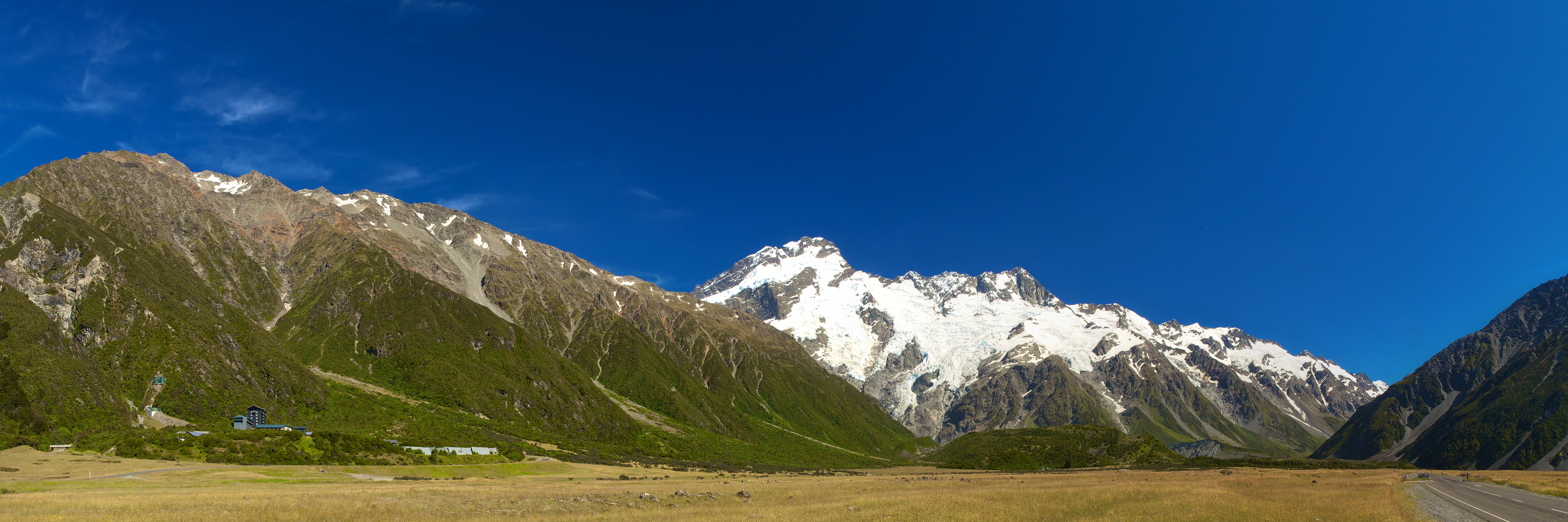
Panorama of Hooker valley with Mount Cook Village on left in front of the Sealy Range, and Mount Sefton and The Footstool in the center of the frame

== Tourism ==
Mount Cook Village caters to a steady flow of around 250,000 visitors per year with a wide range of facilities and accommodation.

An international style hotel, "The Hermitage", the name of which dates back to the original hotel built in 1884, is the only prominent larger building in the village and a popular location, especially for international tourists. The Hermitage is sometimes used as an alternative name for the settlement. The hotel also owns and operates chalets and a lodge and motel with options ranging from backpacker accommodation through to family units.

There are two more motels in the village, and a total of four restaurants or pubs, two of which are inside the main hotel complex. The buildings and motel units are connected via paved footpaths. The small White Horse Hill camping ground is located about 2 kilometres (1.2 mi) outside the village, connected via a walking track.

Commercial operations run guided walks, 4WD safaris, boating on the Tasman glacier lake, horse treks, fishing, and scenic flights including landing on the glaciers. These are based at the hotel, departing and returning to the hotel's main entrance.

A number of nearby walks and climbs ranging from 10 minute bush walks to multi-day tramping tracks and routes can be explored from Mount Cook Village.

There are three short walking tracks through forest areas within the village and on its outskirts, as well as the starting points of longer walking tracks ranging from the popular and easy Hooker Valley Track to more strenuous walks such as the steep track to Sealy Tarns.

The village is home to the park's visitor centre, and the starting point for climbers, hunters and trampers visiting the many huts.

The YHA backpacker hostel closed permanently in December 2021 due to the COVID-19 pandemic. The hostel re-branded as Haka House Hostel and re-opened in 2024.

== Climate ==
Mount Cook Village has an oceanic climate (Cfb). Summers are mild with cool nights while winters are chilly with nightly lows below freezing. Precipitation is extremely heavy year round.

Climate data for Mount Cook Village, elevation 730 m (2,400 ft), (1991–2020 normals, extremes 1929–present)
Month	Jan	Feb	Mar	Apr	May	Jun	Jul	Aug	Sep	Oct	Nov	Dec	Year
Record high °C (°F)	32.8 (91.0)	32.4 (90.3)	29.9 (85.8)	24.4 (75.9)	23.2 (73.8)	19.0 (66.2)	18.3 (64.9)	22.1 (71.8)	25.0 (77.0)	25.7 (78.3)	28.6 (83.5)	30.1 (86.2)	32.8 (91.0)
Mean maximum °C (°F)	28.0 (82.4)	27.6 (81.7)	25.5 (77.9)	21.9 (71.4)	18.1 (64.6)	14.8 (58.6)	14.0 (57.2)	15.6 (60.1)	19.0 (66.2)	21.9 (71.4)	24.4 (75.9)	26.0 (78.8)	29.7 (85.5)
Mean daily maximum °C (°F)	20.4 (68.7)	20.8 (69.4)	18.4 (65.1)	14.9 (58.8)	11.0 (51.8)	7.9 (46.2)	7.2 (45.0)	9.1 (48.4)	11.8 (53.2)	14.0 (57.2)	16.3 (61.3)	18.5 (65.3)	14.2 (57.5)
Daily mean °C (°F)	14.6 (58.3)	14.7 (58.5)	12.4 (54.3)	9.4 (48.9)	6.2 (43.2)	3.2 (37.8)	2.5 (36.5)	4.1 (39.4)	6.6 (43.9)	8.6 (47.5)	10.6 (51.1)	12.8 (55.0)	8.8 (47.9)
Mean daily minimum °C (°F)	8.7 (47.7)	8.5 (47.3)	6.5 (43.7)	4.0 (39.2)	1.3 (34.3)	−1.4 (29.5)	−2.2 (28.0)	−0.8 (30.6)	1.5 (34.7)	3.1 (37.6)	5.0 (41.0)	7.0 (44.6)	3.4 (38.2)
Mean minimum °C (°F)	2.0 (35.6)	2.1 (35.8)	0.4 (32.7)	−1.5 (29.3)	−3.7 (25.3)	−6.8 (19.8)	−7.2 (19.0)	−5.8 (21.6)	−4.0 (24.8)	−2.7 (27.1)	−1.1 (30.0)	1.2 (34.2)	−8.3 (17.1)
Record low °C (°F)	−8.3 (17.1)	−4.4 (24.1)	−7.2 (19.0)	−7.8 (18.0)	−13.3 (8.1)	−13.9 (7.0)	−16.9 (1.6)	−12.8 (9.0)	−15.0 (5.0)	−10.0 (14.0)	−12.2 (10.0)	−10.6 (12.9)	−16.9 (1.6)
Average rainfall mm (inches)	418.7 (16.48)	272.0 (10.71)	315.0 (12.40)	336.5 (13.25)	377.8 (14.87)	291.0 (11.46)	288.6 (11.36)	283.8 (11.17)	361.0 (14.21)	394.4 (15.53)	367.6 (14.47)	425.9 (16.77)	4,132.3 (162.68)
Average rainy days (≥ 1.0 mm)	11.3	9.0	10.0	11.5	15.2	14.2	13.2	13.6	15.0	15.8	13.5	13.8	156.1
Average relative humidity (%)	64.7	69.8	73.7	76.1	81.4	82.0	79.0	79.4	67.5	66.3	64.1	66.7	72.6
Mean monthly sunshine hours	183.5	172.3	157.5	123.8	86.0	73.4	80.0	112.8	121.1	152.1	165.8	178.9	1,607.2
Source: NIWA Climate Data

Climate data for Mt Cook Airport, elevation 656 m (2,152 ft), (2012–2024 normals, extremes 2012–present)
Month	Jan	Feb	Mar	Apr	May	Jun	Jul	Aug	Sep	Oct	Nov	Dec	Year
Record high °C (°F)	33.5 (92.3)	30.5 (86.9)	27.2 (81.0)	23.7 (74.7)	20.3 (68.5)	17.9 (64.2)	16.0 (60.8)	17.7 (63.9)	22.3 (72.1)	26.1 (79.0)	28.5 (83.3)	29.3 (84.7)	33.5 (92.3)
Mean maximum °C (°F)	29.2 (84.6)	28.0 (82.4)	25.6 (78.1)	22.2 (72.0)	18.9 (66.0)	14.9 (58.8)	14.3 (57.7)	15.3 (59.5)	18.9 (66.0)	22.7 (72.9)	24.8 (76.6)	27.0 (80.6)	30.2 (86.4)
Mean daily maximum °C (°F)	22.0 (71.6)	21.7 (71.1)	19.3 (66.7)	15.1 (59.2)	11.9 (53.4)	8.3 (46.9)	7.9 (46.2)	9.6 (49.3)	12.2 (54.0)	14.9 (58.8)	17.1 (62.8)	19.8 (67.6)	15.0 (59.0)
Daily mean °C (°F)	15.5 (59.9)	15.2 (59.4)	12.9 (55.2)	9.5 (49.1)	6.5 (43.7)	3.2 (37.8)	2.8 (37.0)	4.3 (39.7)	6.6 (43.9)	9.2 (48.6)	11.3 (52.3)	13.9 (57.0)	9.2 (48.6)
Mean daily minimum °C (°F)	9.1 (48.4)	8.7 (47.7)	6.6 (43.9)	3.9 (39.0)	1.2 (34.2)	−1.8 (28.8)	−2.4 (27.7)	−0.9 (30.4)	1.0 (33.8)	3.5 (38.3)	5.6 (42.1)	8.1 (46.6)	3.6 (38.4)
Mean minimum °C (°F)	1.2 (34.2)	1.8 (35.2)	0.0 (32.0)	−2.6 (27.3)	−6.0 (21.2)	−8.7 (16.3)	−9.8 (14.4)	−8.6 (16.5)	−6.9 (19.6)	−4.4 (24.1)	−1.5 (29.3)	0.8 (33.4)	−11.6 (11.1)
Record low °C (°F)	−1.9 (28.6)	−0.2 (31.6)	−2.0 (28.4)	−4.5 (23.9)	−8.8 (16.2)	−15.0 (5.0)	−13.7 (7.3)	−14.1 (6.6)	−9.6 (14.7)	−7.5 (18.5)	−3.7 (25.3)	−1.7 (28.9)	−15.0 (5.0)
Average rainfall mm (inches)	235.7 (9.28)	136.8 (5.39)	152.6 (6.01)	191.8 (7.55)	233.7 (9.20)	227.5 (8.96)	235.0 (9.25)	191.1 (7.52)	224.7 (8.85)	223.8 (8.81)	190.3 (7.49)	197.1 (7.76)	2,440.1 (96.07)
Source: NIWA

Climate data for Mueller Hut, elevation 1,818 m (5,965 ft), (1991–2020)
Month	Jan	Feb	Mar	Apr	May	Jun	Jul	Aug	Sep	Oct	Nov	Dec	Year
Mean daily maximum °C (°F)	10.9 (51.6)	11.8 (53.2)	10.3 (50.5)	7.3 (45.1)	4.9 (40.8)	3.7 (38.7)	2.0 (35.6)	2.8 (37.0)	3.8 (38.8)	4.7 (40.5)	7.2 (45.0)	9.3 (48.7)	6.6 (43.8)
Daily mean °C (°F)	7.4 (45.3)	8.3 (46.9)	6.9 (44.4)	3.9 (39.0)	1.9 (35.4)	0.2 (32.4)	−1.2 (29.8)	−0.8 (30.6)	0.1 (32.2)	1.3 (34.3)	3.5 (38.3)	5.6 (42.1)	3.1 (37.6)
Mean daily minimum °C (°F)	3.8 (38.8)	4.9 (40.8)	3.5 (38.3)	0.6 (33.1)	−1.1 (30.0)	−3.2 (26.2)	−4.4 (24.1)	−4.3 (24.3)	−3.5 (25.7)	−2.0 (28.4)	−0.3 (31.5)	2.0 (35.6)	−0.3 (31.4)
Source: NIWA

== Education ==
Aoraki Mount Cook School is a full primary school serving years 1 to 8, with a roll of 5 students as of July 2026. The school opened in 1960.
