= Tasman Lake =

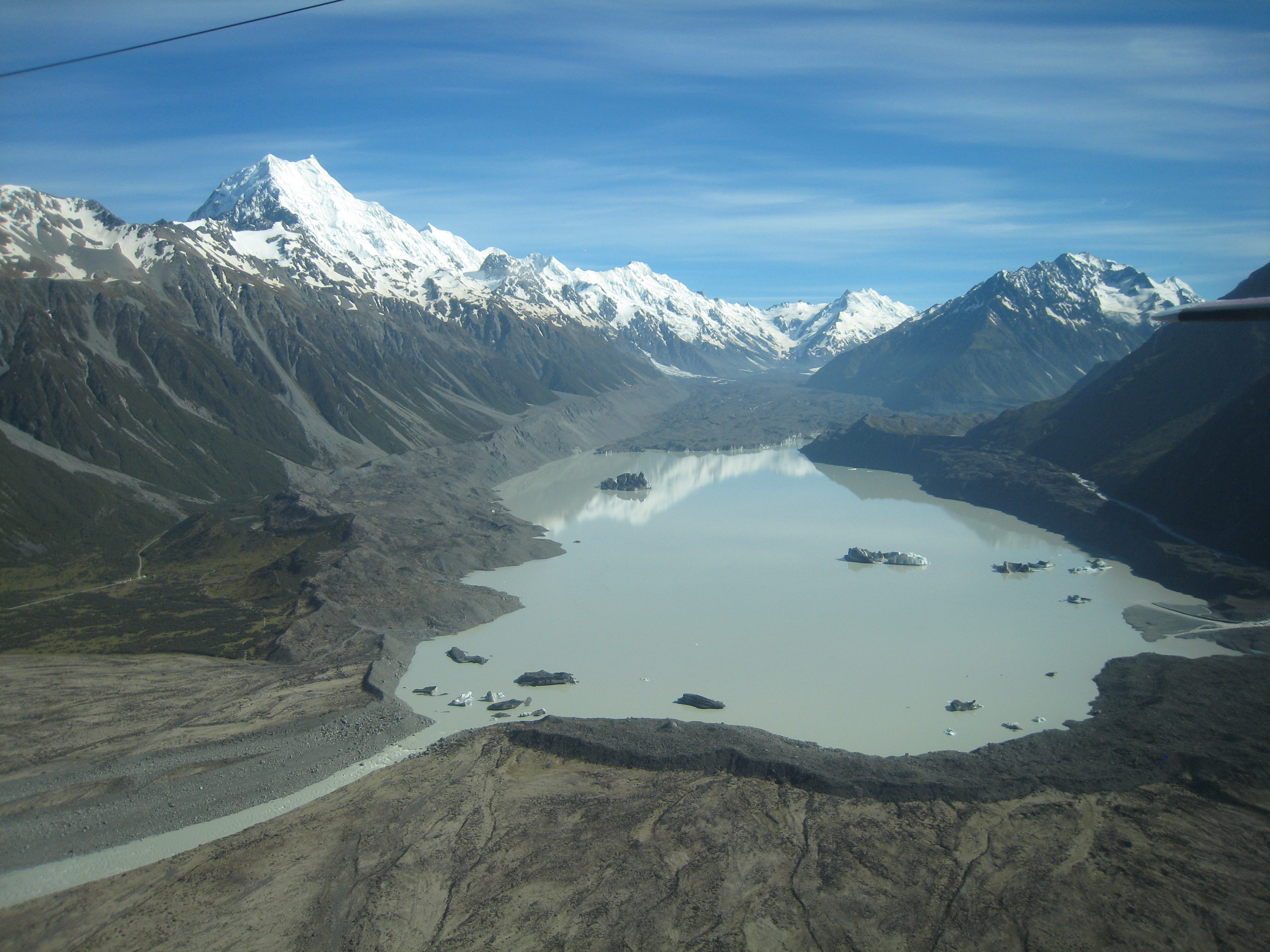
- Lake Tasman and Mount Cook

- Location within South Island
- Interactive map of Tasman Lake
- Location: Aoraki / Mount Cook National Park, South Island
- Coordinates: 43°41′S 170°10′E
- Lake type: Proglacial lake
- Primary outflows: Tasman River
- Basin countries: New Zealand
- Max. length: 7 km (4.3 mi)
- Max. width: 2 km (1.2 mi)
- Surface area: 6.91 km^{2} (2.67 sq mi) in 2013
- Max. depth: > 200 m (660 ft) (likely over 1700 ft deep)
- Surface elevation: 715 m (2,346 ft)
- Frozen: most winters

Tasman Lake is a proglacial lake formed by the recent retreat of the Tasman Glacier in New Zealand's South Island.

In the early 1970s, there were several small meltwater ponds on the Tasman Glacier. By 1990, these ponds had merged into Tasman Lake.

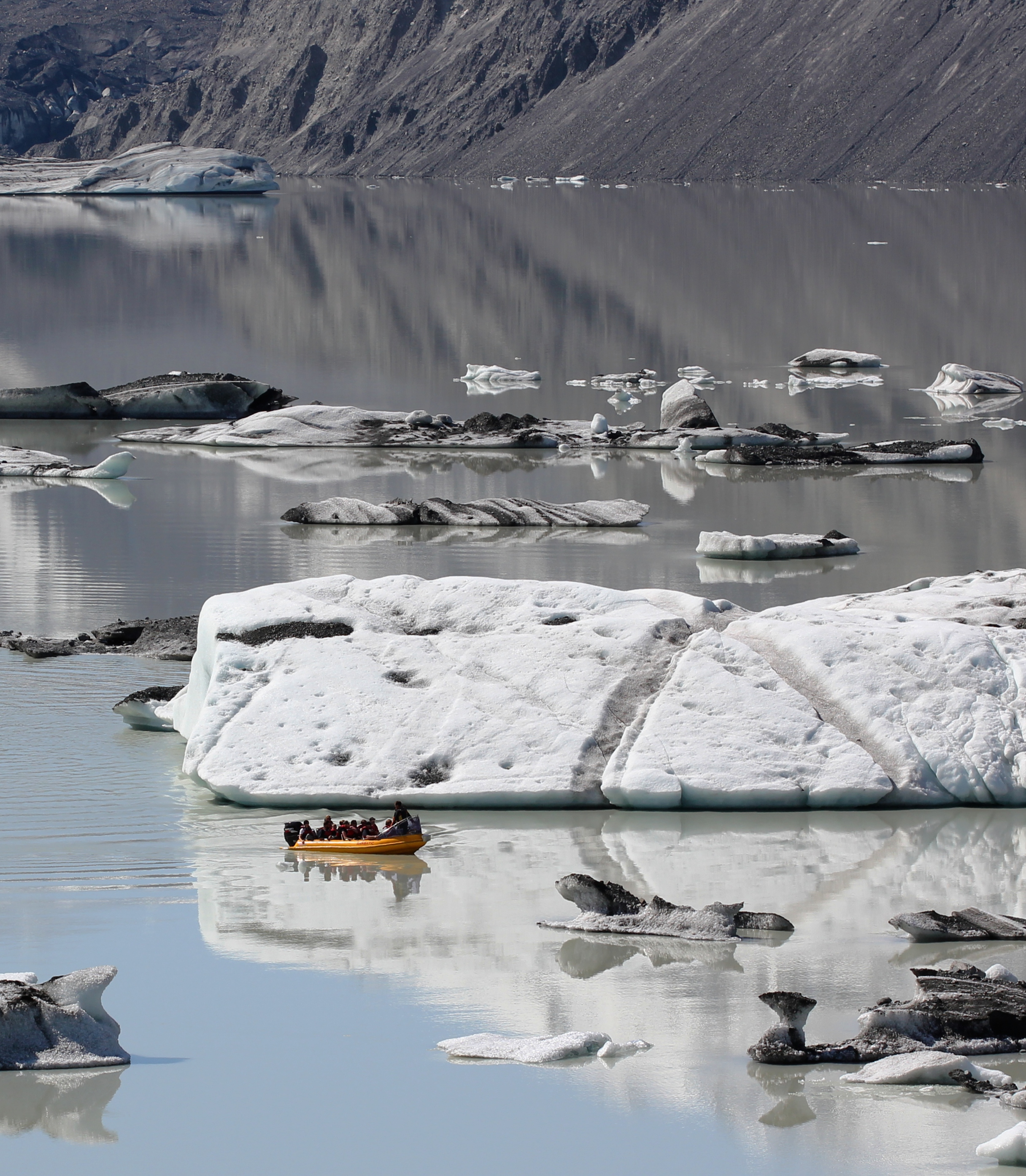
Tour boat among the icebergs on Tasman Lake

Tasman Lake has quickened the retreat of the Tasman Glacier. Initially it did so by undercutting the cliff at the end of the glacier, causing parts of the cliff to fall into the lake. Since 2006, however, a 50–60 m (160–200 ft) apron of submerged glacial ice projects out from the cliff, and icebergs periodically break off the apron and float away down the lake. Because more of the glacier is now in contact with the water, its rate of retreat has increased. By 2008 the lake was about 7 km (4 mi) long, 2 km (1 mi) wide and 245 m (800 ft) deep, having almost doubled in area since 2000. It is expected to grow to a maximum length of about 16 km (9.9 mi) within the next one or two decades. As of 2020, it is around 1,750 feet deep at its deepest point, and could eventually reach over 7000 feet deep.

Tasman Lake, the glacier and the surrounding mountains are part of Aoraki / Mount Cook National Park. Taking a boat tour among the icebergs on the Tasman Lake is now a popular tourist activity. For safety reasons the small inflatable boats are not allowed closer than 1.5 km (0.9 mi) to the 50 m (160 ft) tall terminal face of Tasman Glacier. Tasman Lake can be reached by road from the nearby Mount Cook Village and a short walk from the car park at the end of the road.

Like many other geographic places in both New Zealand and Australia, it is named after Dutch explorer Abel Janszoon Tasman.

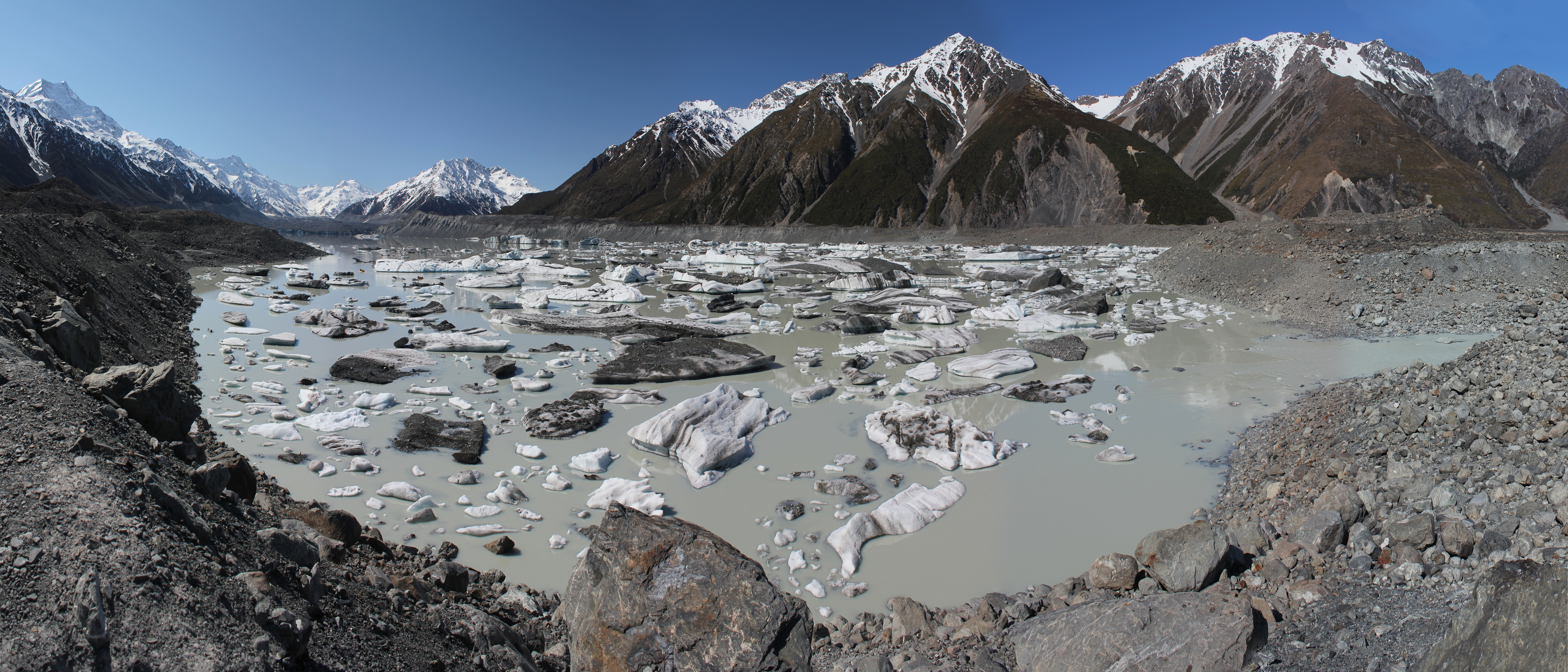
Tasman Lake viewed from near its outlet (right), in spring 2010

== See also ==
- Climate change in New Zealand
