= Pukaki River =

River in New Zealand

Coordinates: 44°19′S 170°14′E

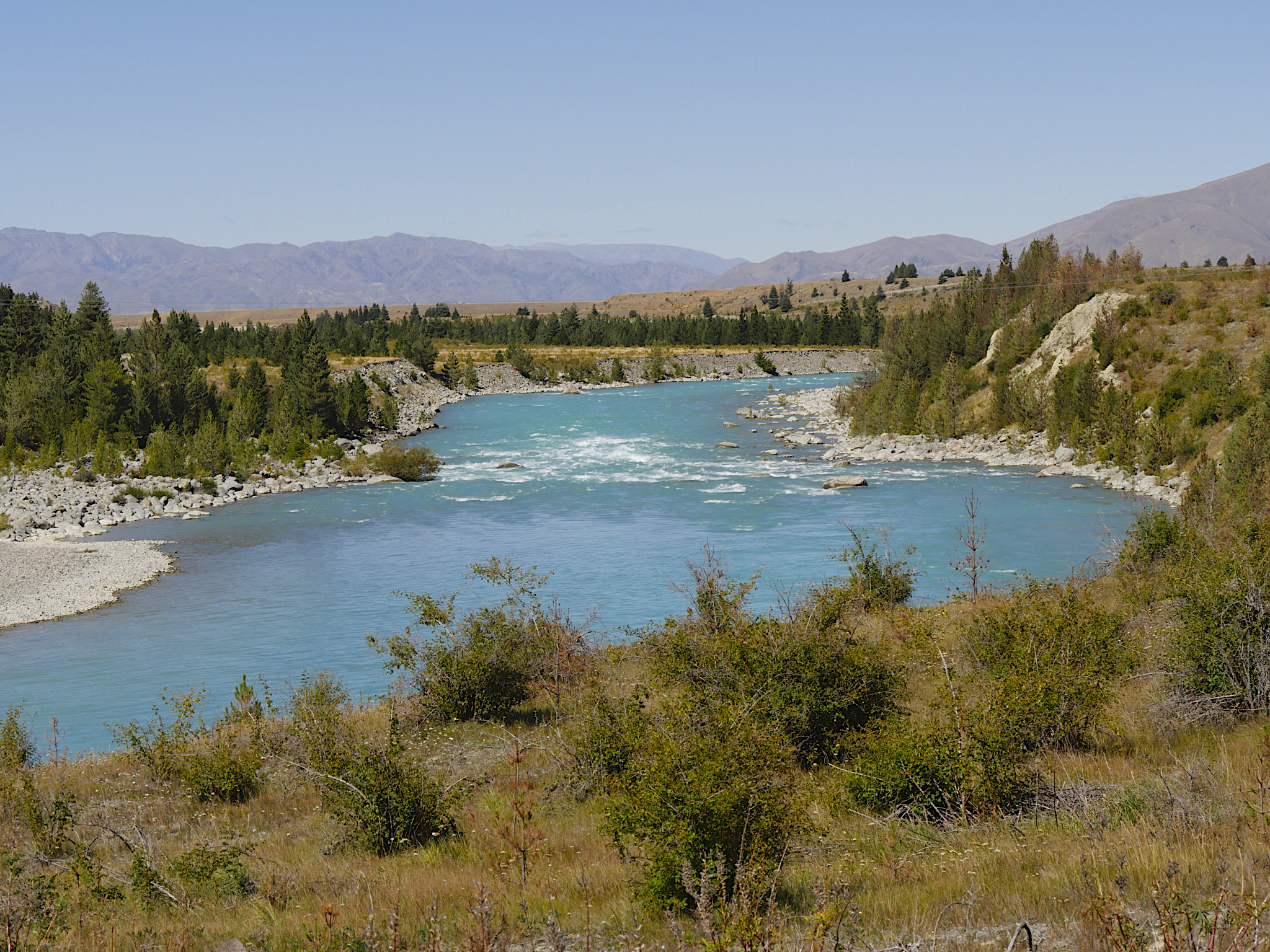
Pukaki River

The Pukaki River flows through the Mackenzie Basin, Canterbury, in New Zealand's South Island.

Originally, the river flowed southwest for 15 kilometres (9 mi) from the southern end of Lake Pukaki before joining with the Tekapo River and flowing into the northern end of Lake Benmore. However, all water from Lake Pukaki is now diverted into a canal which is fed through three hydroelectric stations before being returned directly into Lake Benmore, as part of the Waitaki Hydroelectric scheme. Occasionally, water may be spilled down the riverbed when Lake Pukaki reaches its maximum height, or if a canal or power station requires servicing.

In 2010, Meridian Energy applied for resource consents to build a 35 MW power station at Pukaki's gate 18. Consent was granted for the project in July 2011. Consent for the project expires in 2021.
