= Tasman River =

River in Canterbury, New Zealand

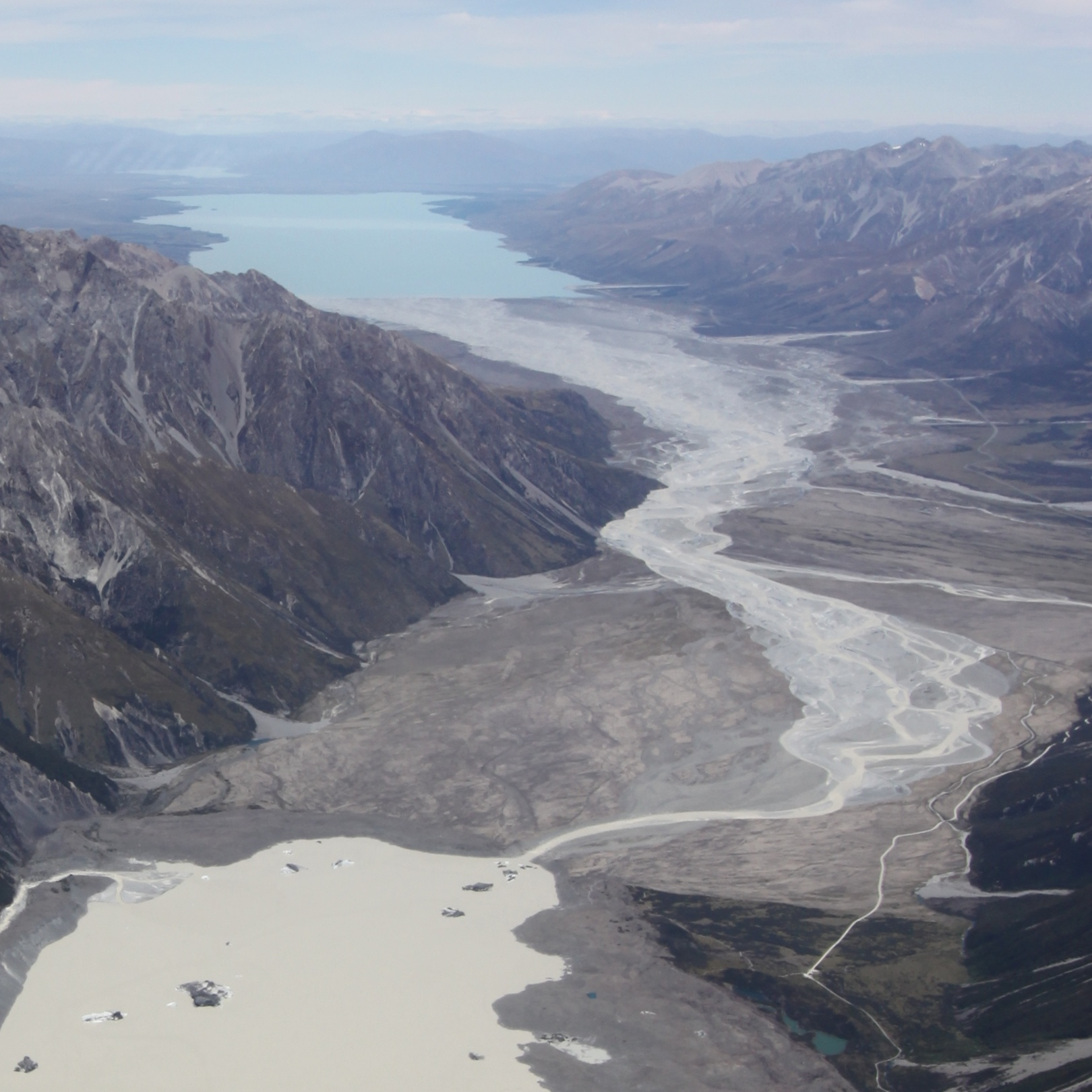
- Tasman River between Tasman Lake in the foreground, and Lake Pukaki in the distance
- Route of the Tasman River
- Mouth of the Tasman River Tasman River (South Island)

Location
- Country: New Zealand

Physical characteristics
- Source
  - location: Tasman Lake
  - coordinates: 43°42′23″S 170°10′18″E
  - elevation: 715 m (2,346 ft)
- Mouth
  - location: Lake Pukaki
  - coordinates: 43°54′18″S 170°10′30″E
  - elevation: 518 to 532 m (1,699 to 1,745 ft)
- Length: 25 km (16 mi)

Basin features
- Progression: Tasman River → Lake Pukaki → Pukaki River → Tekapo River → Lake Benmore → Lake Aviemore → Lake Waitaki → Waitaki River → Pacific Ocean
- Tributaries
  - left: Gorilla Stream, Oatmeal Creek, Chop Creek, Parsons Creek, Lily Stream, Bullrock Stream, Andrews Creek, Waits Creek, Joes Creek, McLeod Creek, Micks Creek, Jollie River, Coxs Creek
  - right: Blue Stream, Hooker River, Black Birch Stream, Sawyer Stream, Birch Hill Stream, Elbow Stream, Freds Stream, Bush Stream, Slip Stream

The Tasman River is an alpine braided river flowing through Canterbury, in New Zealand's South Island.

The river's headwaters are in Aoraki / Mount Cook National Park, where it is the outflow of the proglacial Tasman Lake. It is also fed by the glacial waters of the tributary Murchison River, from Murchison Glacier, and the short Hooker River, an outflow of the proglacial lakes of the Hooker and Mueller glaciers.

The Tasman River flows south for 25 kilometres (16 mi) through the wide flat-bottomed Tasman Valley in the Southern Alps and into the northern end of the glacial Lake Pukaki, this forming part of the ultimate headwaters of the Waitaki hydroelectric scheme.

In 2019, a report by the Department of Conservation was released giving the results of a pilot study on the invertebrate biodiversity present in the Tasman River flood plain.

== See also ==
- List of rivers of New Zealand
