= Mount Jervois =

Mountain in New Zealand

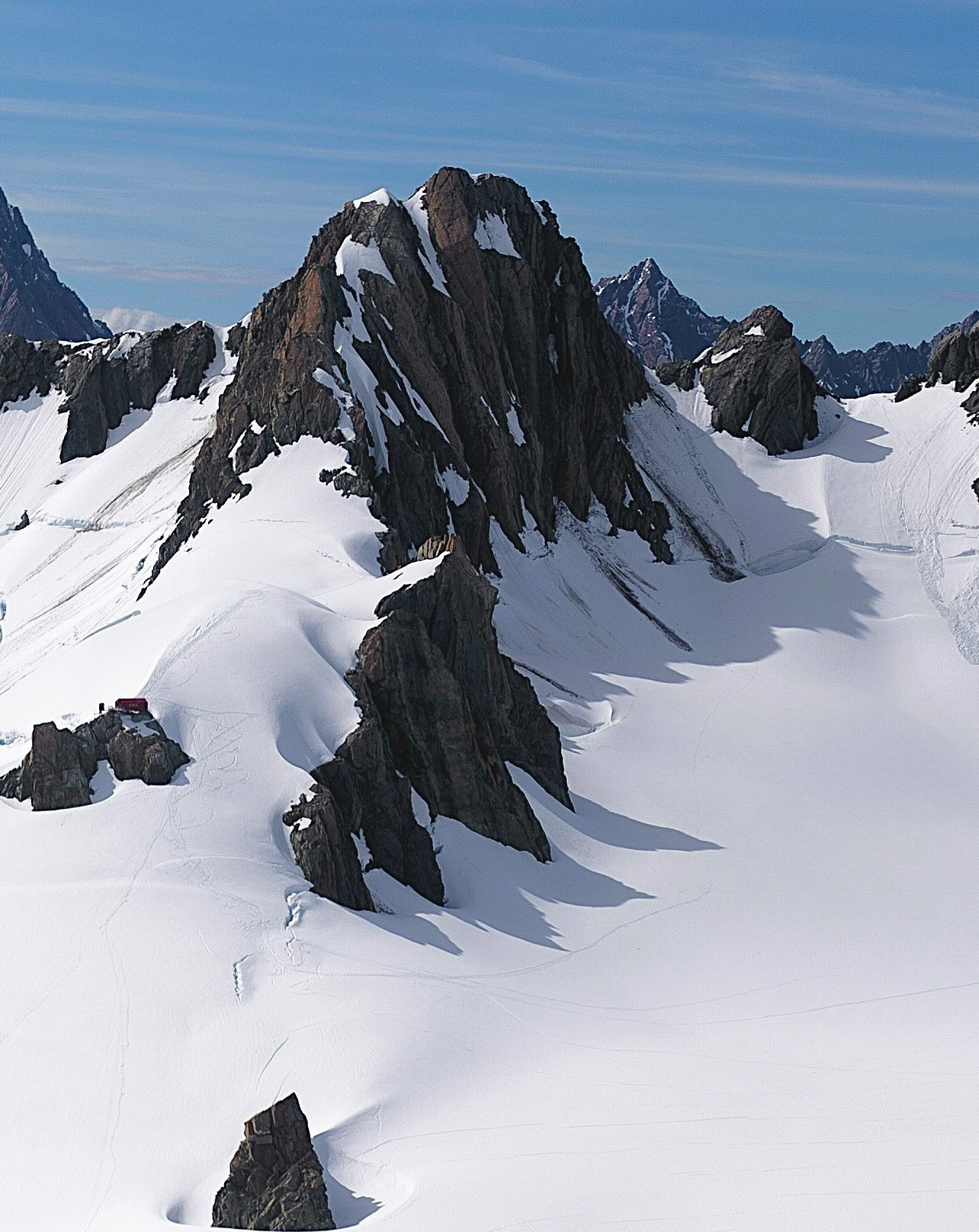
- Northwest aspect

Highest point
- Elevation: 2,630 m (8,629 ft)
- Prominence: 105 m (344 ft)
- Isolation: 0.946 km (0.588 mi)
- Coordinates: 43.5131399°S 170.2377288°E

Geography
- Location within New Zealand
- Interactive map of Mount Jervois
- Location: South Island
- Country: New Zealand
- Region: Canterbury / West Coast
- Protected area: Aoraki / Mount Cook National Park; Westland Tai Poutini National Park
- Parent range: Southern Alps
- Topo map(s): NZMS260 H34; Topo50 BX16

Climbing
- First ascent: 1916

Mount Jervois is a 2,630-metre-elevation (8,629-foot) mountain in New Zealand.

== Description ==
Mount Jervois is set on the crest or Main Divide of the Southern Alps and is situated on the boundary shared by the West Coast and Canterbury Regions of the South Island. This peak is located 11.5 kilometres (7.1 mi) northeast of Aoraki / Mount Cook and set on the boundary shared by Aoraki / Mount Cook National Park and Westland Tai Poutini National Park. Precipitation runoff from the mountain drains north to the Waiho River and south to the Tasman River. Topographic relief is significant as the summit rises 730 metres (2,395 feet) above the Rudolf Glacier in one kilometre, and 1,350 metres (4,429 feet) above the Tasman Glacier in four kilometres. The Centennial Hut is perched on the northwest ridge of this peak.

Mount Jervois was named by Robert von Lendenfeld to honour the then-Governor of New Zealand, William Jervois, who served in that role from 1883 to 1889.

== Climbing ==
The first ascent of the summit was made in April 1916 by Alex Graham and B. Marsden.

Climbing routes with the first ascents:

- Main Divide – Alex Graham, B. Marsden – (1916)
- North West Ridge – Ida Corry, Mark Lysons – (1933)
- Team Piha – G. Pennycook, F. Eldridge, L. Andersson – (2008)

== Climate ==
Based on the Köppen climate classification, Mount Jervois is located in a marine west coast (Cfb) climate zone, with a subpolar oceanic climate (Cfc) at the summit. Prevailing westerly winds blow moist air from the Tasman Sea onto the mountains, where the air is forced upwards by the mountains (orographic lift), causing moisture to drop in the form of rain or snow. This climate supports the Franz Josef, Agassiz, and Rudolf glaciers surrounding the peak. The months of December through February offer the most favourable weather for viewing or climbing this peak.

== See also ==
- List of mountains of New Zealand by height
- William Jervois
