= Mount Spencer (Southern Alps) =

Mountain in New Zealand

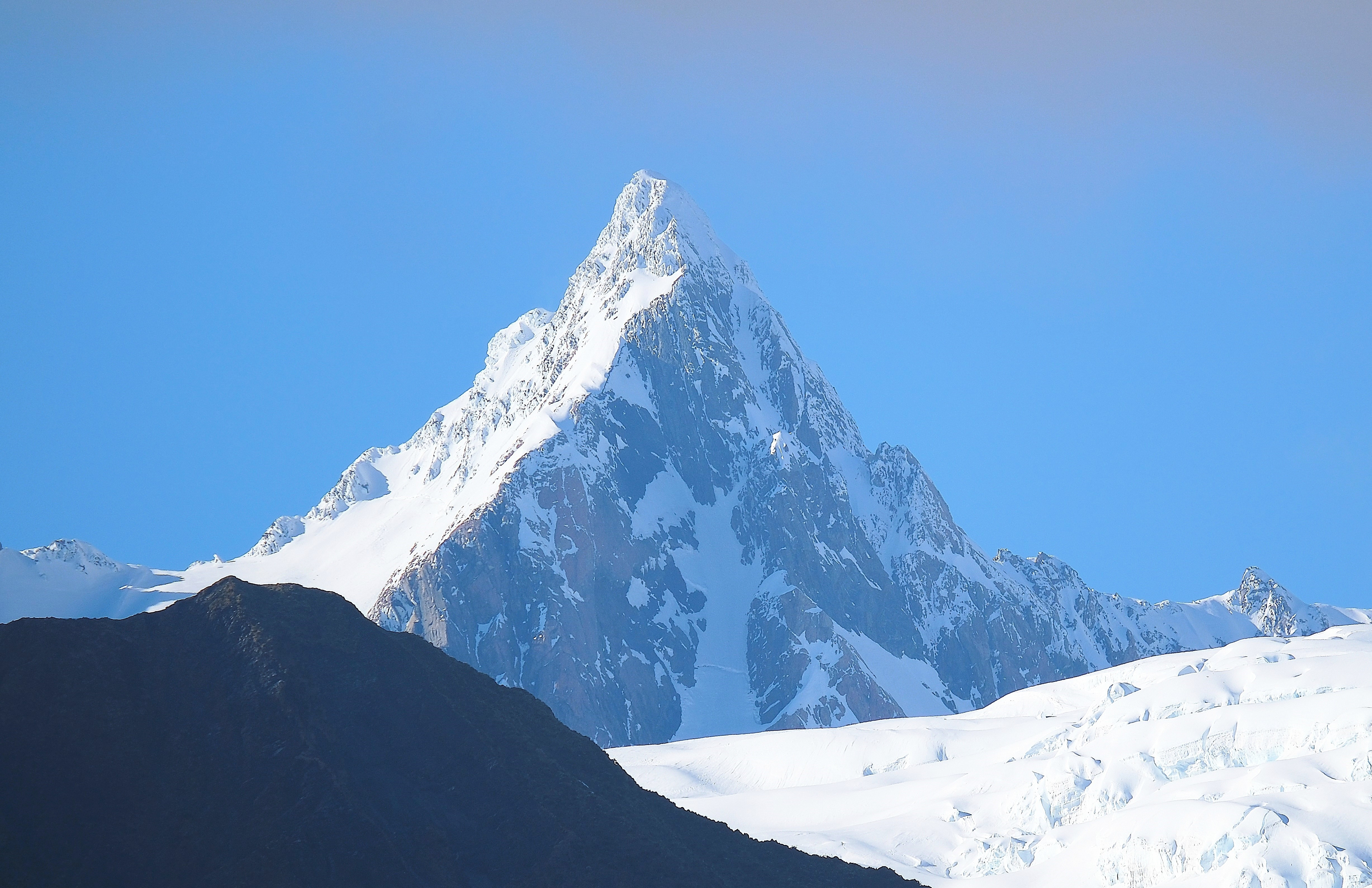
- North aspect

Highest point
- Elevation: 2,788 m (9,147 ft)
- Prominence: 157 m (515 ft)
- Parent peak: Aoraki / Mount Cook
- Isolation: 0.99 km (0.62 mi)
- Coordinates: 43°31′27″S 170°13′15″E

Naming
- Etymology: Herbert Spencer

Geography
- Location within New Zealand
- Interactive map of Mount Spencer
- Location: South Island
- Country: New Zealand
- Region: West Coast / Canterbury
- District: Westland / Mackenzie
- Protected area: Aoraki / Mount Cook National Park; Westland Tai Poutini National Park
- Parent range: Southern Alps
- Topo map(s): NZMS260 H36; Topo50 BX16

Geology
- Rock type: Greywacke

Climbing
- First ascent: 1914
- Easiest route: North Ridge

Mount Spencer is a mountain on the shared border of the West Coast and Canterbury Regions of New Zealand.

== Description ==
Mount Spencer is a 2,788-metre-elevation (9,147-foot) summit situated on the crest of the Southern Alps in the South Island. This peak is located 10 kilometres (6.2 mi) northeast of Aoraki / Mount Cook and set on the boundary shared by Aoraki / Mount Cook National Park and Westland Tai Poutini National Park. Precipitation runoff from the mountain drains northwest to the Waiho River, and southeast to the Tasman River. Topographic relief is significant as the summit rises 1,200 metres (3,937 feet) above the Rudolf Glacier in two kilometres. The nearest higher neighbour is Mount Barnicoat, one kilometre to the west-southwest. The mountain's toponym was applied by Dr. Robert von Lendenfeld to honour Herbert Spencer (1820–1903), English philosopher, psychologist, biologist, sociologist, and anthropologist. The mountain's toponym has appeared in publications since 1892.

== Climbing ==
Established climbing routes with first ascents:

- North Ridge – Ebenezer Teichelmann, Alex Graham – (1914)
- Northwest Ridge – Frank Alack, H.K. Douglas – (1936)
- Via Tasman Glacier – Tim Barfoot, John Luxton, Richard Tornquist – (1962)
- West Buttress – Phil Castle, Phil Grover – (1981)
- Northwest Pinnacle – Carol McDermott, Craig Stobo – (1985)
- Jungle Drums – Peter Taw, Alistair Byron – (1989)
- Pitch Black – James Wright, Alex Palman – (2000)
- Acid Punch – Anjali Pande, Alex Palman – (2000)
- First Light – Jon Tyler, Gavin Lang – (2016)

== Climate ==
Based on the Köppen climate classification, Mount Spencer is located in a marine west coast (Cfb) climate zone. Prevailing westerly winds blow moist air from the Tasman Sea onto the mountains, where the air is forced upward by the mountains (orographic lift), causing moisture to fall in the form of rain or snow. This climate supports the Rudolf Glacier on the eastern slope of the peak and the Agassiz Glacier on the northwest slope. The months of December through February offer the most favourable weather for viewing or climbing this peak.

== See also ==
- List of mountains of New Zealand by height
