= Callery =

Callery can refer to:

== People ==
- Joseph-Marie Callery (1810-1862), Italian-French sinologist and naturalist
- Sean Callery, film and television composer
- Simon Callery, artist

== Places ==
- Callery, Pennsylvania
- Callery River, a river of New Zealand.
