= Rose Graham =

Rose Graham may refer to:

- Rose Graham (historian) (died 1963), British
- Rose Graham (hotelier) (died 1974), New Zealander
