= Ōmoeroa River =

River in New Zealand

- Route of the Ōmoeroa River
- Mouth of the Ōmoeroa River Ōmoeroa River (New Zealand)

Location
- Country: New Zealand
- Region: West Coast
- District: Westland

Physical characteristics
- Source: Baumann Glacier
  - coordinates: 43.4642°S 170.1467°E
- Mouth: Tasman Sea
  - coordinates: 43°18′46″S 170°01′43″E
  - elevation: 0 m (0 ft)
- Length: 25 kilometres (16 mi)

Basin features
- Progression: Ōmoeroa River → Tasman Sea
- River system: Ōmoeroa River
- Tributaries
  - left: Gibb Creek
  - right: Pug Creek

The Ōmoeroa River is a river of the West Coast region of New Zealand's South Island. It flows northwest from its source high in the Southern Alps, 14 kilometres north of Aoraki / Mount Cook, reaching the Tasman Sea 12 kilometres west of Franz Josef.

The New Zealand Ministry for Culture and Heritage gives a translation of "place of the long sleep" for Ōmoeroa.

== See also ==
- List of rivers of New Zealand
