= Franz Josef Glacier =

Glacier in the Southern Alps, New Zealand

Franz Josef Glacier / Kā Roimata o Hine Hukatere
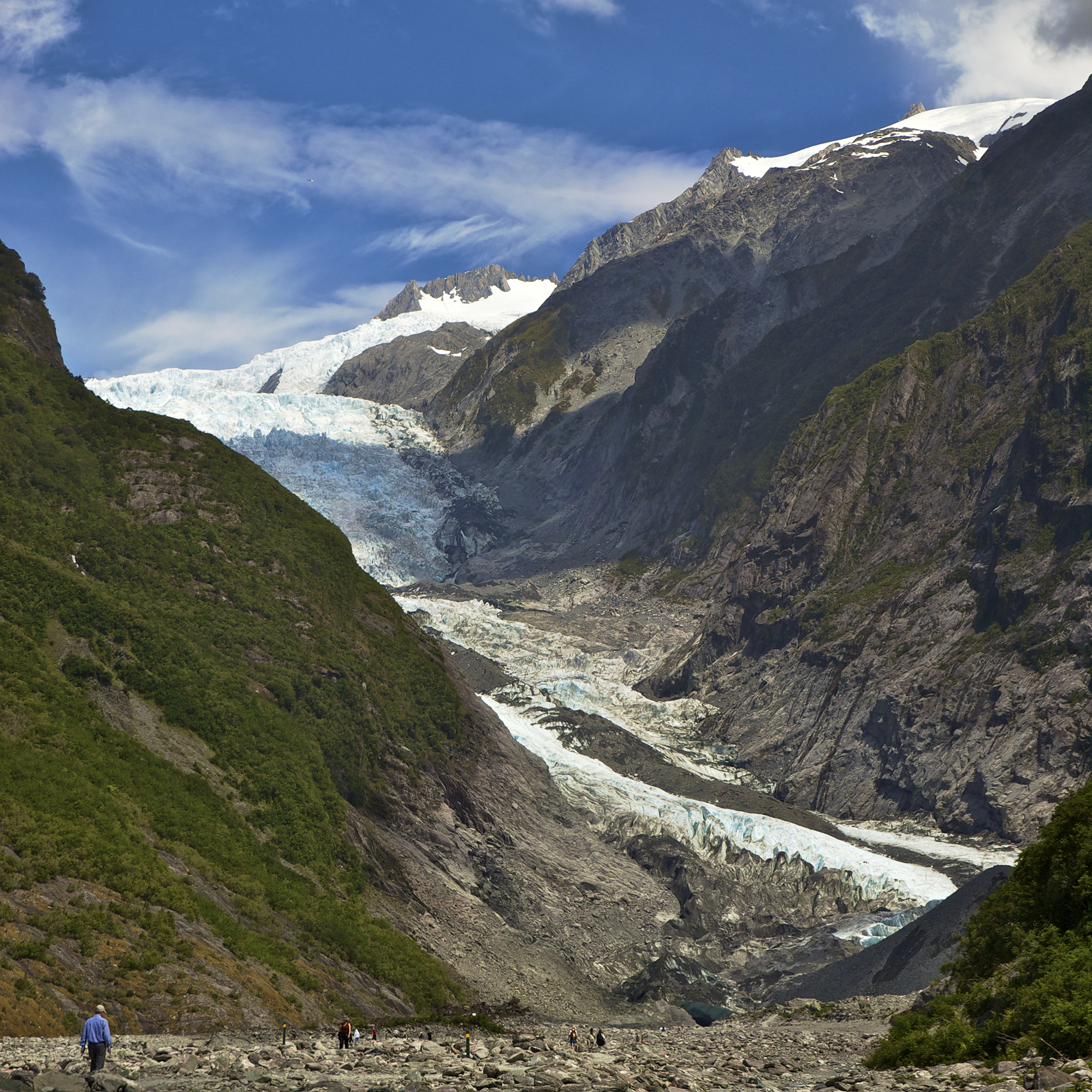
- Franz Josef Glacier in 2011

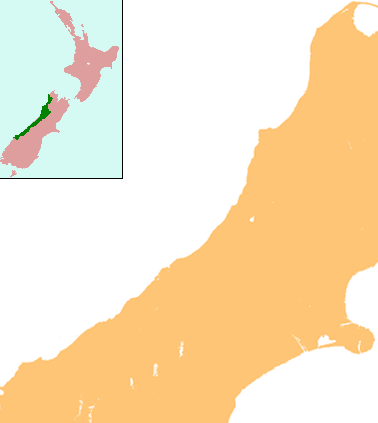
- Location within West Coast
- Location: Westland Tai Poutini National Park
- Coordinates: 43°28′01″S 170°11′30″E
- Length: 12 km (7.5 mi)
- Thickness: Up to 300 metres (980 ft) thick
- Status: Retreating

The Franz Josef Glacier (Māori: Kā Roimata o Hine Hukatere; officially Franz Josef Glacier / Kā Roimata o Hine Hukatere) is a 12-kilometre-long (7.5 mi) temperate maritime glacier in Westland Tai Poutini National Park on the West Coast of New Zealand's South Island. Together with the Fox Glacier 20 kilometres (12 mi) to the south, and a third glacier, it descends from the Southern Alps to less than 300 metres (980 ft) above sea level.

The area surrounding the two glaciers is part of Te Wāhipounamu, a World Heritage Site park. The Waiho River emerges from the glacier terminal of Franz Josef.

== Naming ==
The Māori name for the glacier is Kā Roimata o Hine Hukatere, literally: 'The tears of Hine Hukatere'. According to oral tradition, Hine Hukatere loved climbing in the mountains and persuaded her lover Tuawe to climb with her. Tuawe was a less experienced climber than Hine Hukatere but loved to accompany her, until an avalanche swept him from the peaks to his death. Hine Hukatere was broken-hearted and her many, many tears flowed down the mountain. Rangi the Sky Father took pity on her and froze them to form the glacier.

The first European description of one of the West Coast glaciers (believed to be Franz Josef) was made in the log of the ship Mary Louisa in 1859. The glacier was later named after Emperor Franz Joseph I of Austria by the German geologist Julius von Haast in 1865.

Following the passage of the Ngāi Tahu Claims Settlement Act 1998, the name of the glacier was officially altered to Franz Josef Glacier / Kā Roimata o Hine Hukatere.

== Geography ==
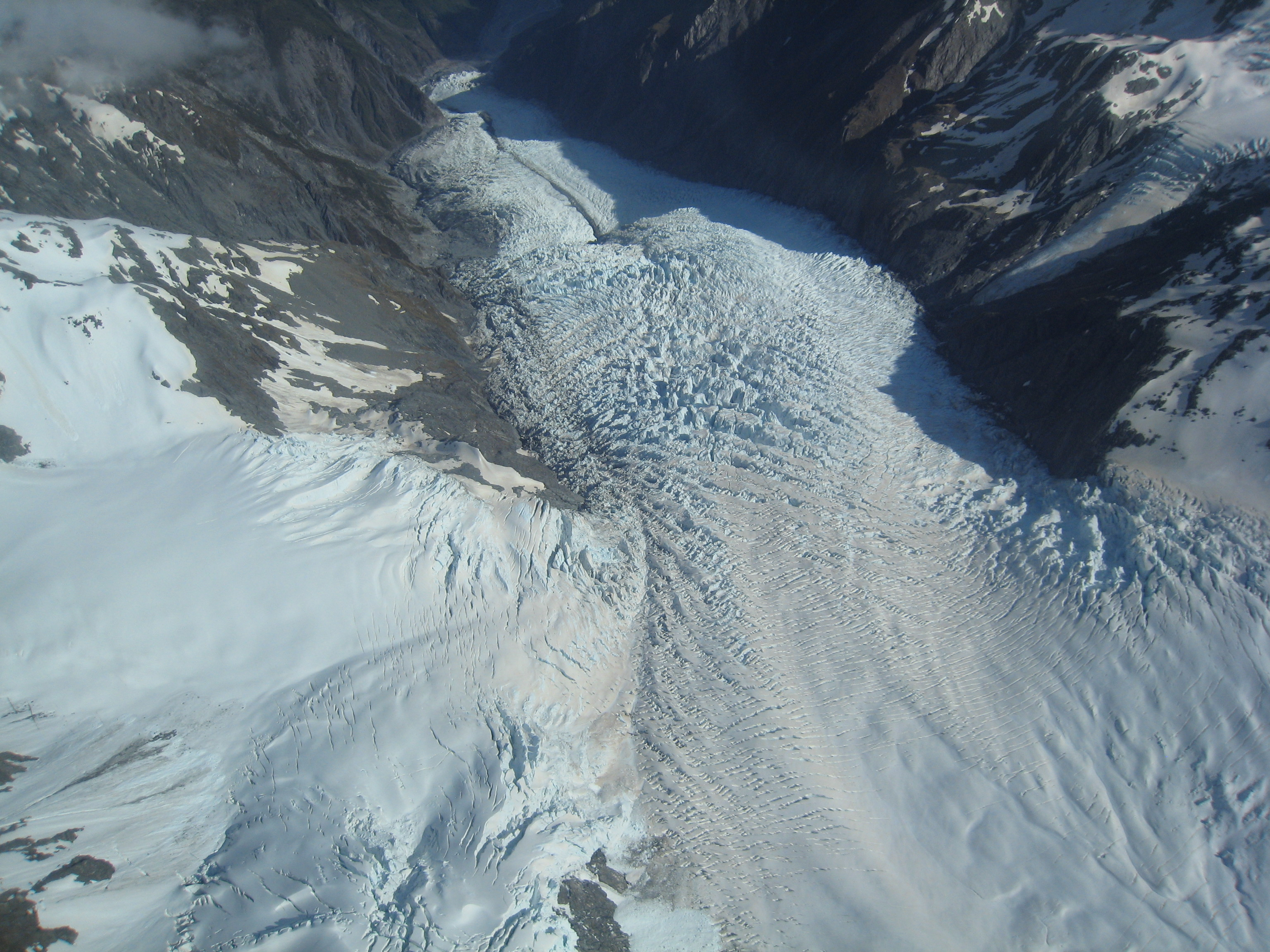
An aerial view down the glacier.

The névé or snowfield at the head of Franz Josef Glacier is over 2,500 metres (8,200 ft) above sea level and 20 square kilometres (7.7 sq mi) in area. This wide névé, which is over 300 metres (980 ft) deep, feeds large amounts of compacted snow into a steep and narrow valley which drops quickly to very low altitudes: the glacier descends to 300 metres (980 ft) above sea level in just 11 km (6.8 mi). This combination of factors leads to Franz Josef persisting where most temperate-zone glaciers would have already melted, and allows it to share a valley with temperate rain forest.

Franz Josef Glacier currently terminates 19 km (12 mi) from the Tasman Sea. Near the end of the last ice age about 18,000 years ago it extended to the present-day coastline or even beyond. As it retreated the glacier left behind moraines of accumulated rock and chunks of ice which created coastal hills and lakes. Lake Wombat is a kettle lake created by ice left in a moraine 9000 years ago, while Peters Pool close to the glacier's face was created in the same way around 1805.

The Waiho Loop 4 km north of the settlement of Franz Josef is the terminal moraine of Franz Josef Glacier, deposited by the retreating glacier about 12,000–3,000 years ago. An arc of rubble 80 m high, it was too rugged to be cleared for farming, and remains covered in native forest.

== Advance and retreat ==
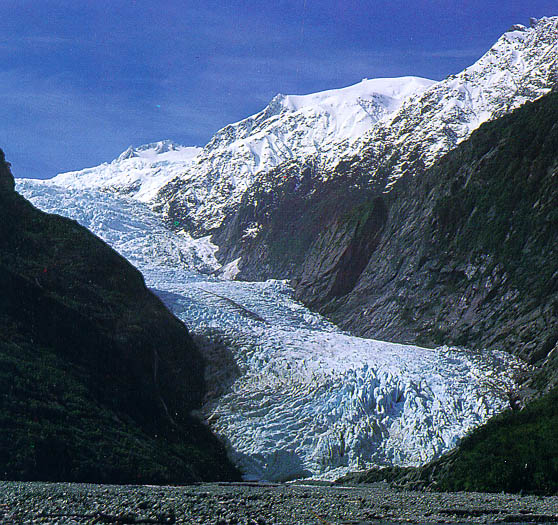
The glacier from the valley floor in 2001

Franz Josef Glacier exhibits a cyclic pattern of advance and retreat, driven by differences between the volume of meltwater at the foot of the glacier and volume of snowfall feeding the névé. Over the past 14,000 years glaciers worldwide have generally retreated. Most of New Zealand's large glaciers shrank significantly towards the end of the 20th century because of global warming. However, in the Southern Alps warmer temperatures cause increased precipitation on the western face of the Main Divide, and Franz Josef glacier being short and steep is more sensitive to increased snow in the névé than other glaciers. If the increased precipitation falls as snow, the glacier will advance; if as rain, it will retreat. Increased snowfall takes around 5–6 years to result in changes in the terminus location.

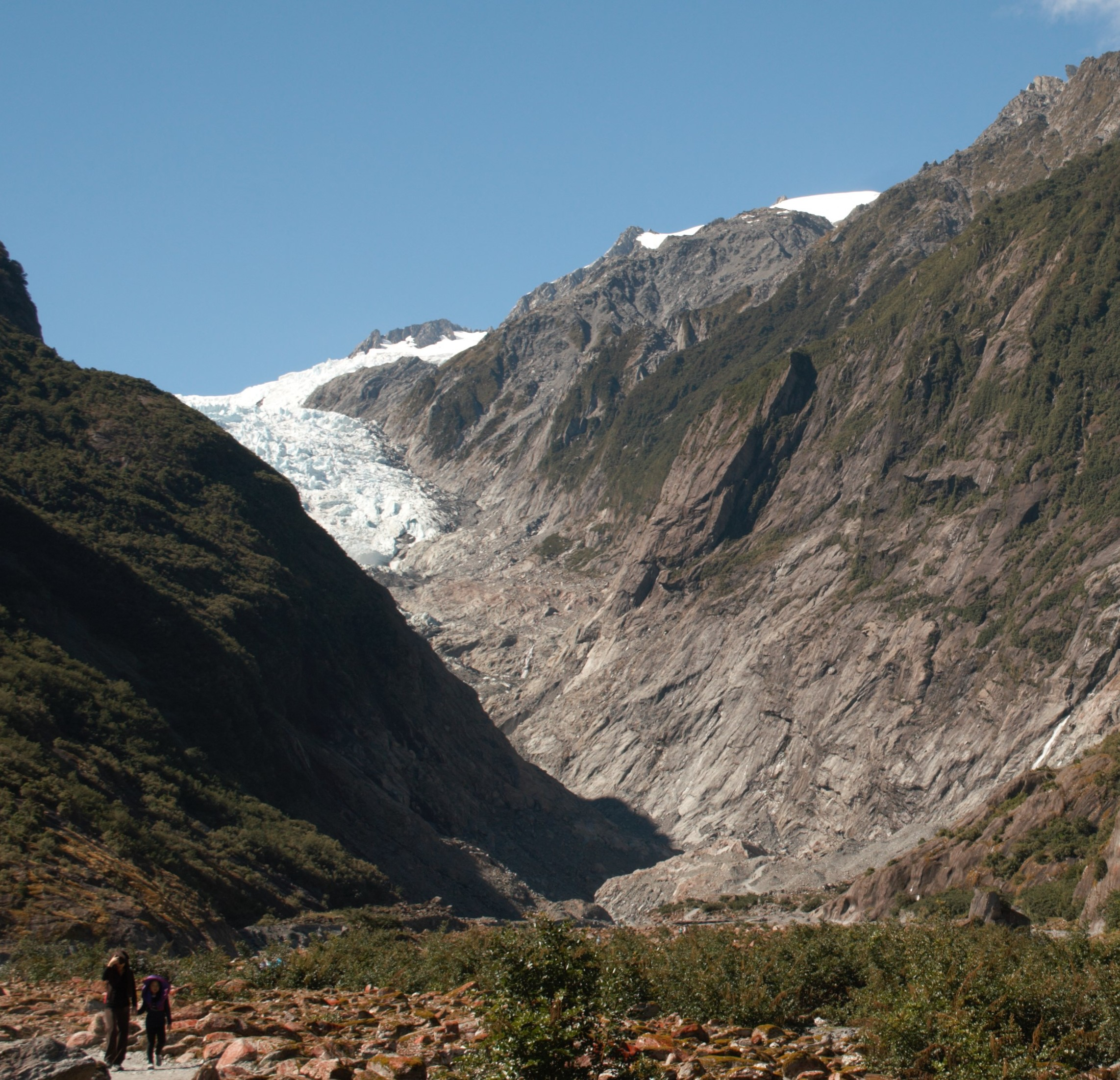
The same viewpoint in 2016

Franz Josef Glacier advanced rapidly during the Little Ice Age, reaching a maximum in the early 18th century. When Haast became the first European to reach the glacier it was still much longer than today, and the ice surface was 300 m higher. Between its first official mapping in 1893 and a century later in 1983, Franz Josef Glacier retreated 3 km up the valley.

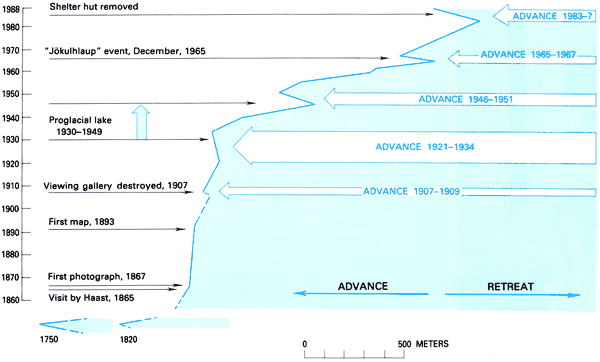
Historic variations of the terminus position of the Franz Josef Glacier and associated events.

There were several periods of advance in the 20th century – 1946 to 1951 (340 m), 1965 to 1967 (400 m), 1983 to 1999 (1420 m) and 2004 to 2008 (280 m) – but all were followed by periods of greater retreat.

Terminus in winter 2025

This cyclic behaviour is illustrated by a postage stamp issued in 1946, depicting the view from St James Anglican Church. The church was built in 1931, with a panoramic altar window to take advantage of its location. By 1954, the glacier had disappeared from view from the church, but it reappeared briefly in 1997.

Between 1983 and 2008 while most of the world's glaciers were retreating many New Zealand glaciers advanced. Franz Josef regained nearly half the ice it had lost over the previous century. This anomalous growth has been attributed not to increased rainfall but to a series of cool years caused by increased southerly air flow in the Tasman sea. After 2008 the glacier entered a very rapid phase of retreat, shrinking by 1.5 km between 2008 and 2017. By 2014 it was 3 km shorter than it was 100 years earlier. Based on these patterns, Franz Josef Glacier is predicted to retreat 5 kilometres (3.1 mi) and lose 38% of its mass by 2100 in a mid-range scenario of warming, although it may retreat as much as 8 kilometres (5.0 mi).

== Floods ==
There have been some incidents of jökulhlaups (outbreak floods from water-filled ice tunnels) at the glacier. The névé of Fox and Franz Josef glaciers has one of the world's highest precipitation levels: up to 15 m a year. In December 1965, after 280 mm of rain in two days, the Waiho River broke out of the glacier and carried chunks of ice downriver. These were still up to 50 cm across when they reached the Tasman Sea 20 km downstream. Another flood destroyed the access road bridge in 1989, followed by a further flood in April 1991. Torrential rain destroyed the bridge across the Waiho River in March 2019, and it took 18 days to replace it.

== Flora ==
Westland Tai Poutini National Park is one of the few places in New Zealand with a full sequence of pristine landscape from mountain peaks to the sea. The retreat of Franz Josef Glacier has allowed native forest to colonise the bare rock left behind, and how long ago the glacier retreated can be read in the stage of plant succession present. Some bare rock was only exposed a decade ago, while other surfaces were exposed in 1951, 1830, 1750, and 1600.

== Tourism ==
Fox and Franz Josef glaciers are the most publicly-accessible glaciers in New Zealand, and among the most accessible in the world – until recently, there was easy walking access directly to the glaciers' termini. Consequently for over a century they have been a significant tourist attraction.

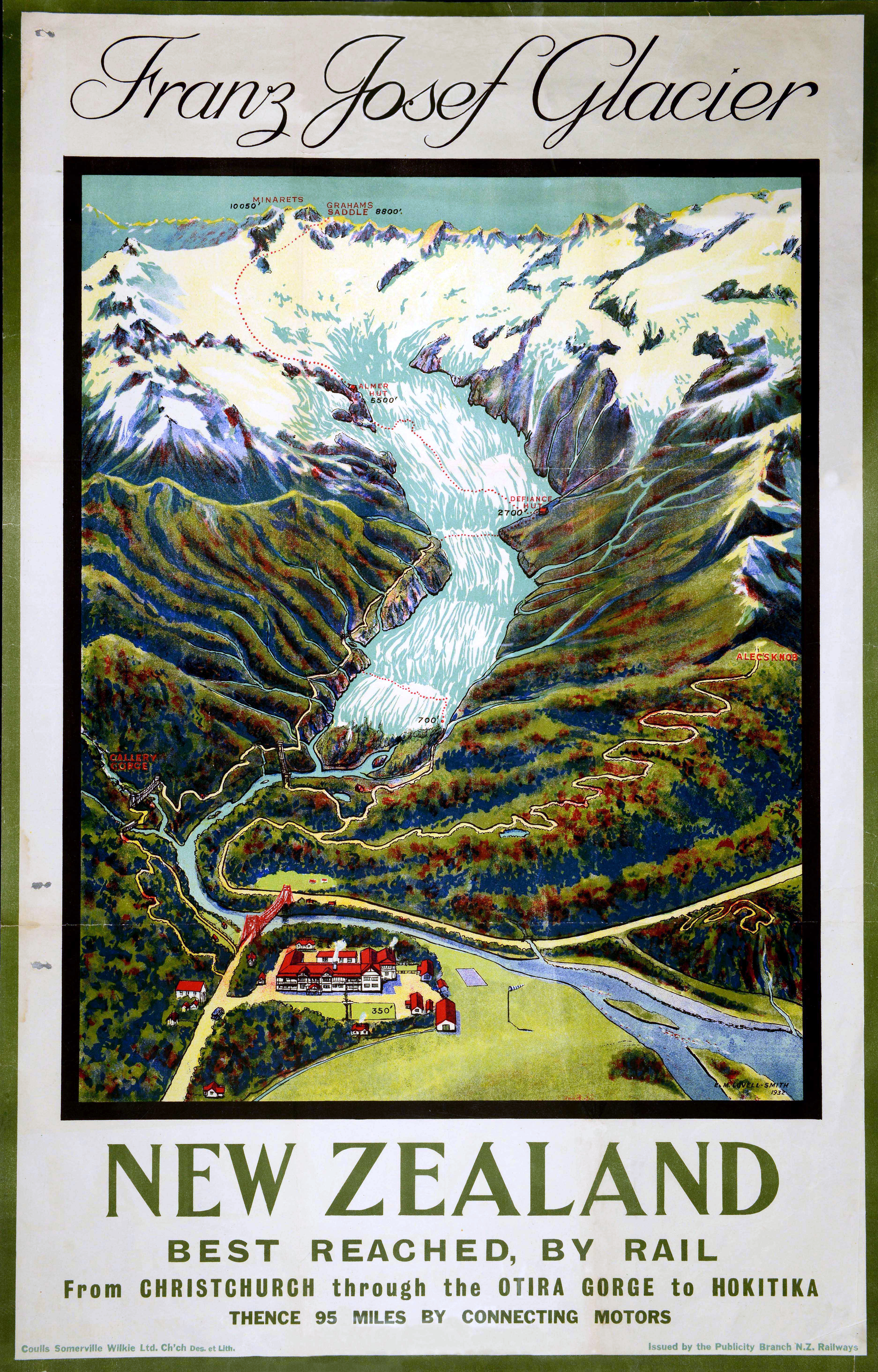
1932 New Zealand Railways tourism poster

The glacier is associated with the Graham family, in particular mountaineers and guides Alec and Peter Graham, Rose Graham and historian Dorothy Fletcher (née Graham). Services in their hotel brought about the construction of St James Church.

Extract from the February 1936 issue of National Geographic magazine:

But the Franz Josef Glacier and its background of mountains is worth waiting long to see on a clear day. It is one of the most remarkable glaciers in the world. Slipping down from a large snowfield at more than 8,000 feet [2440 m], it terminates in subtropical bush, only 700 feet [213 m] above sea level. Movement in its upper reaches is remarkably rapid, 15 or more feet [4.5 m] a day.

Airplane flights have proved a popular method of seeing this eight-mile [13 km] long river of bluish-green ice, pressing down among hills that are aflame in January with red flowering rata trees.

With Captain Mercer, I flew over the glacier and looked out toward the snow fields and bold Alps, and I also went with him on the initial air-mail route in New Zealand.

The Franz Josef glacier area is the third-most-visited tourist spot in New Zealand, and one of the main tourist attractions on the West Coast. It had around 250,000 visitors in 2008, increasing to 700,000 (500,000 overnight) in 2017. It used to be possible to walk up to the glacier, but in March 2012 the terminal face of the glacier collapsed and it is now too dangerous to approach; signs warn against crossing the safety barriers at the lookout. As of 2023, the valley walk ended at a lookout about 3000 m from the main terminal face of the glacier. Visiting the glacier required a helicopter flight past the unstable terminal face. Glacier walks also required some specialised equipment, namely ice axes and crampons that latch onto a sturdy boot. These were usually provided by tour companies.

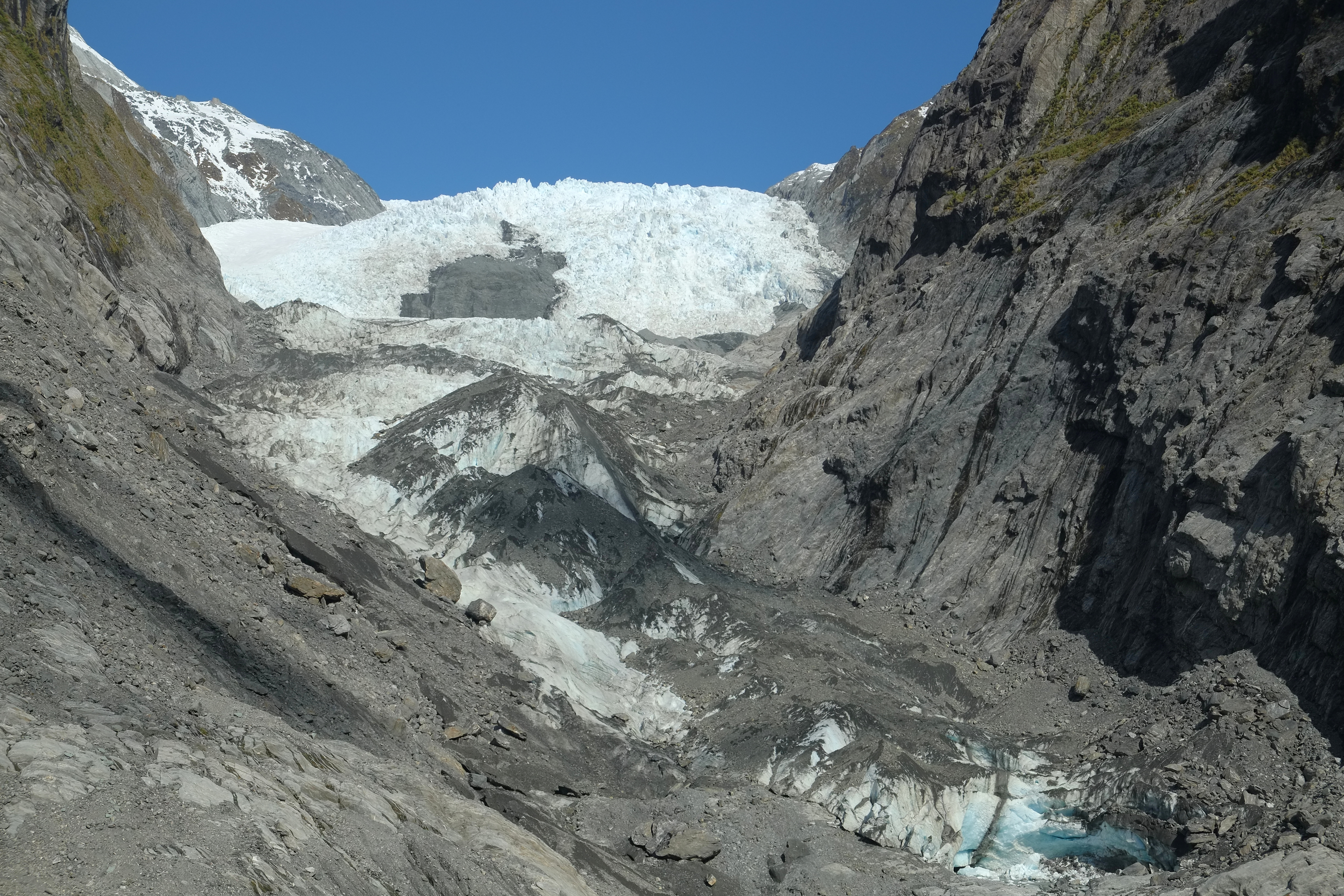
Terminal face of Franz Josef Glacier viewed from lookout at end of valley walk as of 2014

As the walking part of any tour up to the glacier takes a long time, and ends at the first icefall (a frozen waterfall, draping a natural step in the land underneath), many tourists book helicopter tours from one of the several local operators, which usually drop their guests between the first and second icefalls, for a guided 1–2 hour walk through the broken ice atop the glacier. Although the glacial landscape changes almost daily, given the glacier's unusually fast flow and some walks including passages through ice tunnels, they are still considered quite safe and only somewhat strenuous. In June 2010, an Australian tourist died of a heart attack during a guided hike of the glacier.

An alternative option to view the glacier is via the 8-hour day hike up the 1,303 metres (4,275 ft) high Alex Knob, overlooking the Franz Josef Glacier and valley below. The path up Alex Knob is of good tramping track standard, but strenuous due to steeply climbing about 1,100 metres (3,600 ft) in height and considered "advanced" due to the duration of the hike.

At the entrance of the valley lies the village of Franz Josef, which has a permanent population of approximately 330. It is situated 5 km from the glacier on State Highway 6 and has a petrol station, small but busy heliport, numerous tourist accommodation options (with up to 2,000 people staying overnight during the main season) and a number of restaurants and shops. Just south of the village, a sealed road leads from the highway into the Franz Josef Glacier valley and to a car park. Several small walks start from the Valley Road and the car park, and it is also possible to comfortably ride a bicycle from Franz Josef township to the car park.

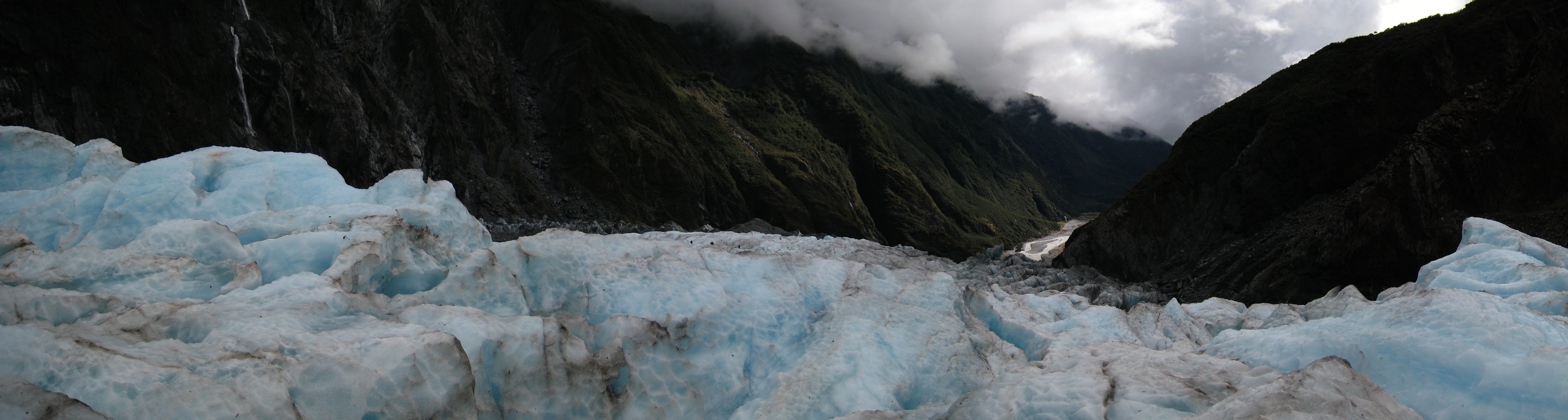
Panoramic view from Franz Josef Glacier

== See also ==
- Agassiz Glacier (New Zealand)
- Tasman Glacier
- Fox Glacier
- Glaciers of New Zealand
- Glacial retreat since 1850
- Climate change in New Zealand
