= Callery River =

River in West Coast Region, New Zealand

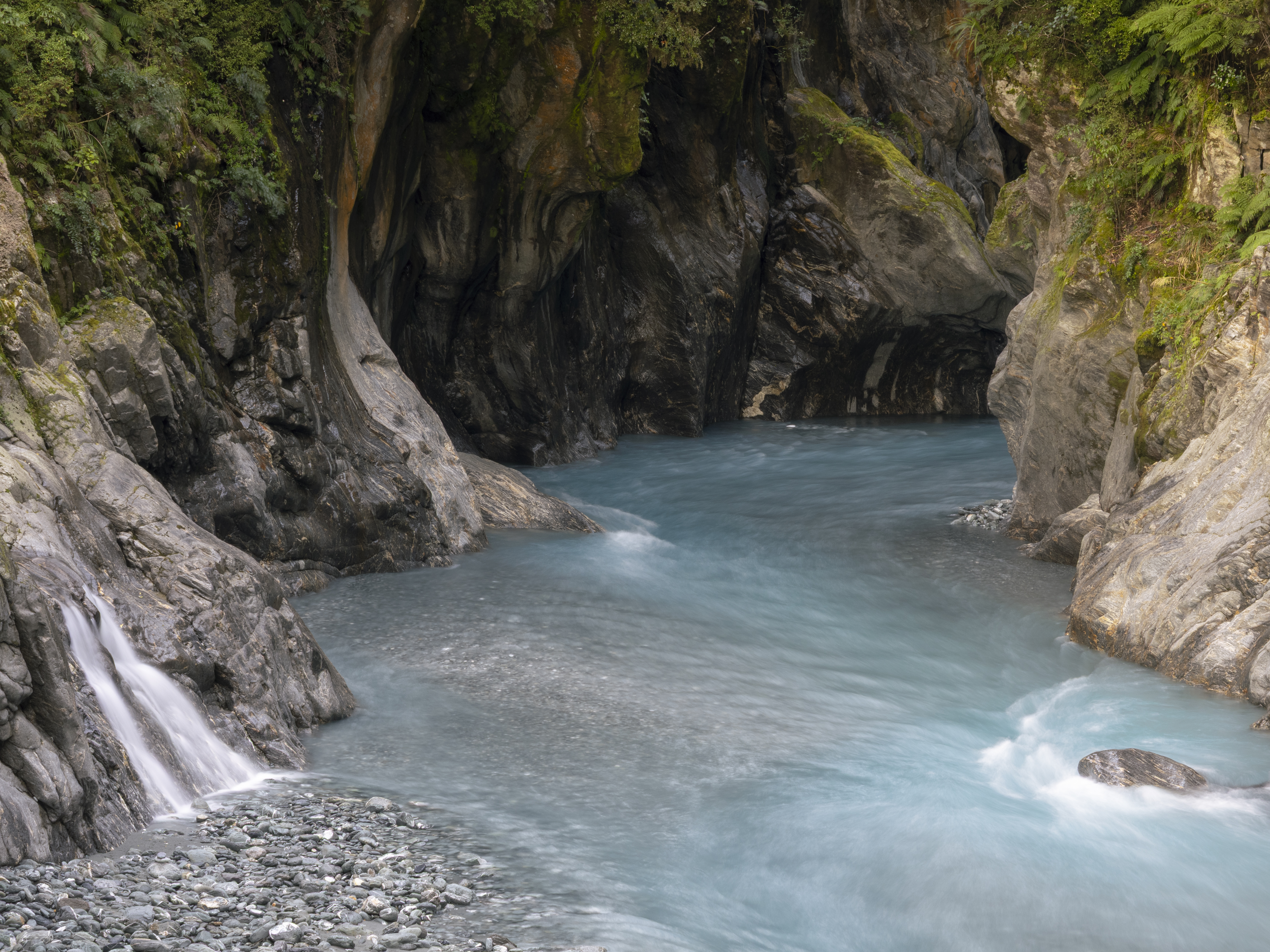
- The Callery River seen from Callery Gorge Walk
- Route of the Callery River
- Mouth of the Callery River Callery River (New Zealand)

Location
- Country: New Zealand
- Region: West Coast
- District: Westland

Physical characteristics
- Source: Junction Peak
  - location: Maximilian Range
  - coordinates: 43.4213°S 170.3279°E
  - elevation: 1,200 m (3,900 ft)
- Mouth
  - location: Waiho River
  - coordinates: 43°23′56″S 170°11′03″E
  - elevation: 155 m (509 ft)
- Length: 16 kilometres (9.9 mi)

Basin features
- Progression: Callery River → Waiho River → Tasman Sea
- River system: Waiho River
- Tributaries
  - right: Arthur Creek

The Callery River is a river of New Zealand. It lies mostly within Westland Tai Poutini National Park, and is a tributary of the Waiho River. The Callery flows west from the Callery Saddle for 16 kilometres (10 mi) before turning north to reach the Waiho close to Franz Josef township.

== See also ==
- List of rivers of New Zealand
