= St James Church, Franz Josef =

Church in Franz Josef, New Zealand

St James Church
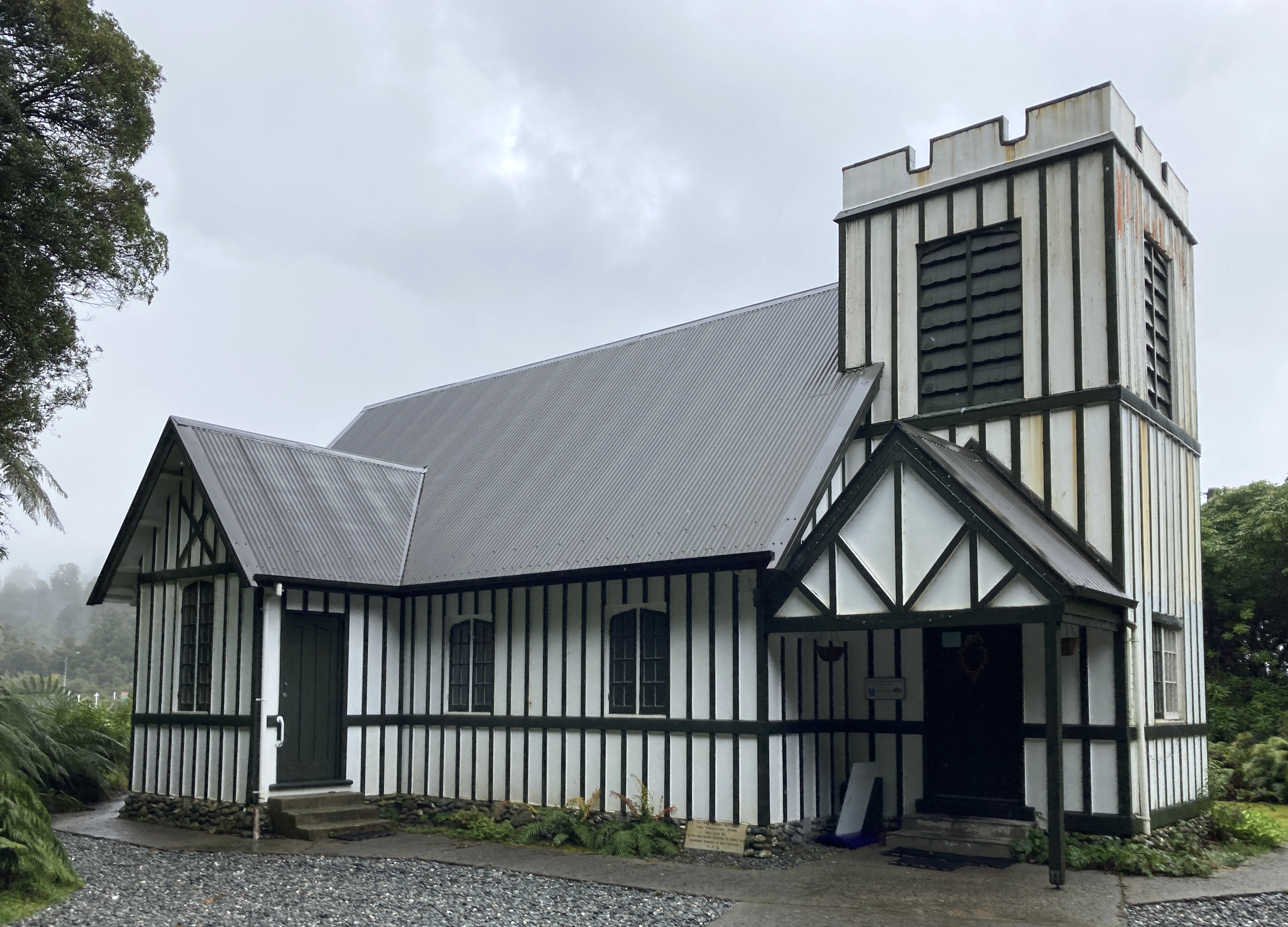
- St James Church in 2020
- St James Church
- 43°23′27″S 170°10′52″E
- Address: State Highway 6, Waiho Gorge, Franz Josef / Waiau, South Island
- Country: New Zealand
- Denomination: Anglican
- Website: anglicanlife.org.nz/churches/st-james-waiho-gorge/

History
- Status: Church
- Founded: February 1931
- Founder(s): Governor-General, Lord Bledisloe
- Dedication: James the Great; Rev'd James R. Young
- Consecrated: 26 April 1931 by Bishop West-Watson

Architecture
- Architects: James S. Turnbull; Percy Watts Rule
- Architectural type: Church
- Style: Tudor Revival Selwynesque
- Construction cost: NZ£1,400

Specifications
- Capacity: 100 people

Administration
- Province: Anglican Church in Aotearoa, New Zealand and Polynesia
- Diocese: Christchurch
- Parish: Ross and South Westland

Heritage New Zealand – Category 1
- Designated: 28 June 1990
- Reference no.: 4994

St James Church is an heritage-listed Anglican church located in Franz Josef on the West Coast of the South Island of New Zealand. Set in a garden setting, the church was built in 1931 in a Tudor Revival style and is notable for its use of clear glass windows and the view over Waiho Gorge from its altar. This view originally included Franz Josef Glacier, a famous scene recorded on a 1946 Peace Stamp, but the glacier has since receded.

== Background ==
The Ross and South Westland parish was created in 1867, but a church at Franz Josef was not proposed until 1925. Reverend James R. Young, Vicar of the parish between 1923 and 1928, suggested a building of riverstone, and a site was donated by Peter and Alec Graham, notable climbing guides and operators of the Franz Josef Glacier Hotel. Plans were drawn up by Maurice Guthrie, but these were rejected as being too expensive for the nine Anglican families of the area. Archdeacon Julius visited Westland in February 1927, and afterwards suggested a wooden church with views of the Waiho River and Franz Josef Glacier. Plans were commissioned from James S. Turnbull and Percy Watts Rule of Timaru in 1928.

== Construction ==
The site was cleared for building in March 1930, tenders were called in November of that year, and a contract for the construction was awarded to Bullock and Stewart in 1931. The foundation stone for the church was laid by the Governor-General, Lord Bledisloe, in early February 1931. The construction cost of the church was around £1000–1400.

The dedication ceremony was held on 26 April 1931 by Bishop West-Watson of Christchurch, assisted by Reverends James R. Young (then of Hāwera) and Alwyn Warren, vicar of Ross and South Westland, in front of a congregation of 150. The church was dedicated to St James, but named in part to honour James Young, who had proposed it be built, in recognition of his services to the community.

The church is described as of 'Selwynesque' or Tudor in style. The walls are constructed of board-and-batten, with a corrugated iron roof. There is castellated bell tower. The church is decorated with a highly distinctive style, with dark brown paint used to highlight the exterior battens and roof trusses. Rather than the more usual stained glass windows, the building features three clear plate glass apsidal windows, overlooking the Waiho River. When the church was built it also had a view of the Franz Josef Glacier, but by 1953 this had retreated out of view. From 1985 to 2006, the glacier generally advanced and thickened, and by 1997 it was once again visible through the altar window before retreating again.

== History ==
The more famous Church of the Good Shepherd at Lake Tekapo also incorporates clear glass windows to allow for a view of the lake, a feature which was inspired by the prior use at St James.

The church achieved national recognition when the view across the altar to the mountains was featured on a 9d Peace stamp entitled A Spirit of Thankfulness, issued in 1946 to commemorate the end of World War Two.

On 28 June 1990, the building was registered by the New Zealand Historic Places Trust (now Heritage New Zealand) as a Category I structure, with register number 4994. The building is considered notable for the way in which it complements its bush surroundings, and the use of clear glass windows behind the altar.

In December 1995, 750 mm (30 in) of rain fell over a three-day period, washing away the northern approach to the Waiho River bridge, and gouging out the river bank to within 6 m (20 ft) of St James Church. In September–October 1996, civil works costing $300,000, including a contribution of $50,000 from the Anglican Church Property Trust, were completed to protect both the bridge approaches and the church from future flood events.

== Gallery ==
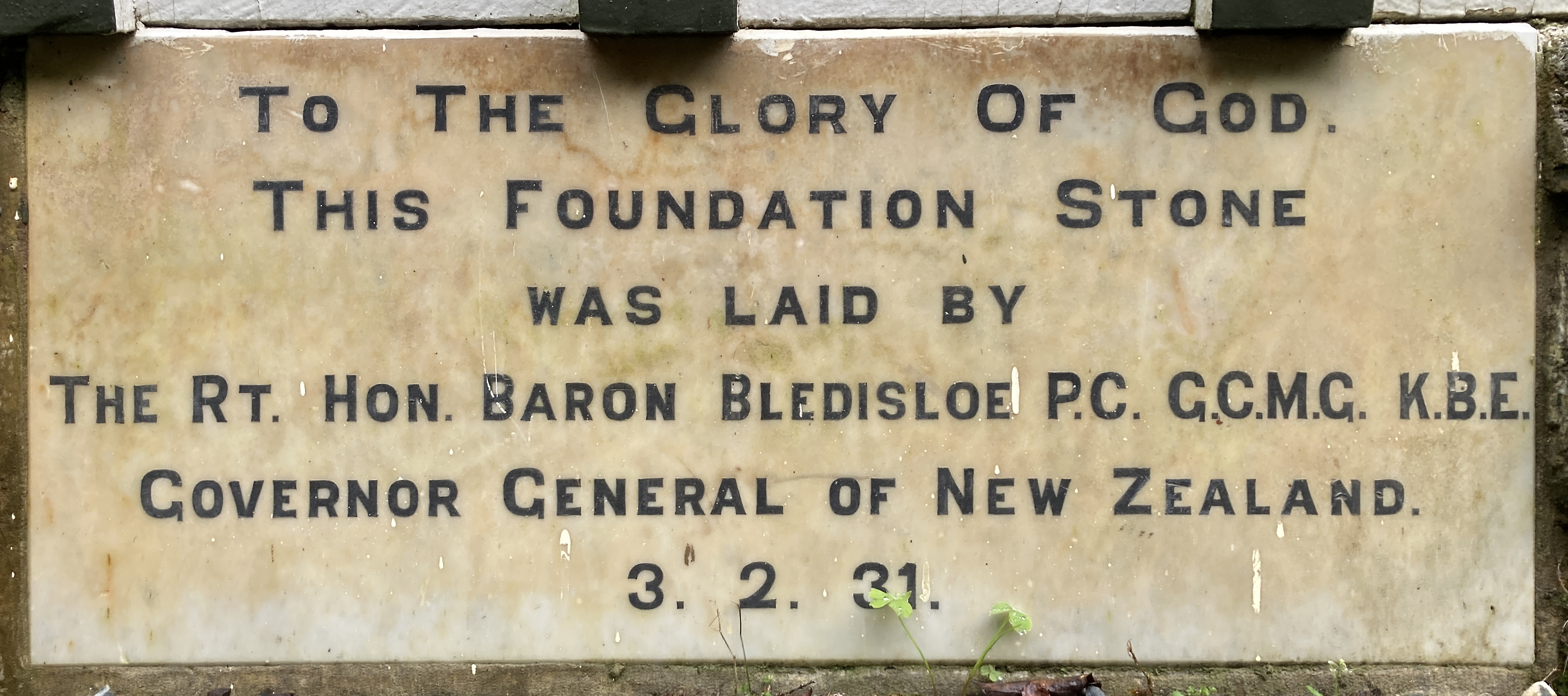
Foundation stone

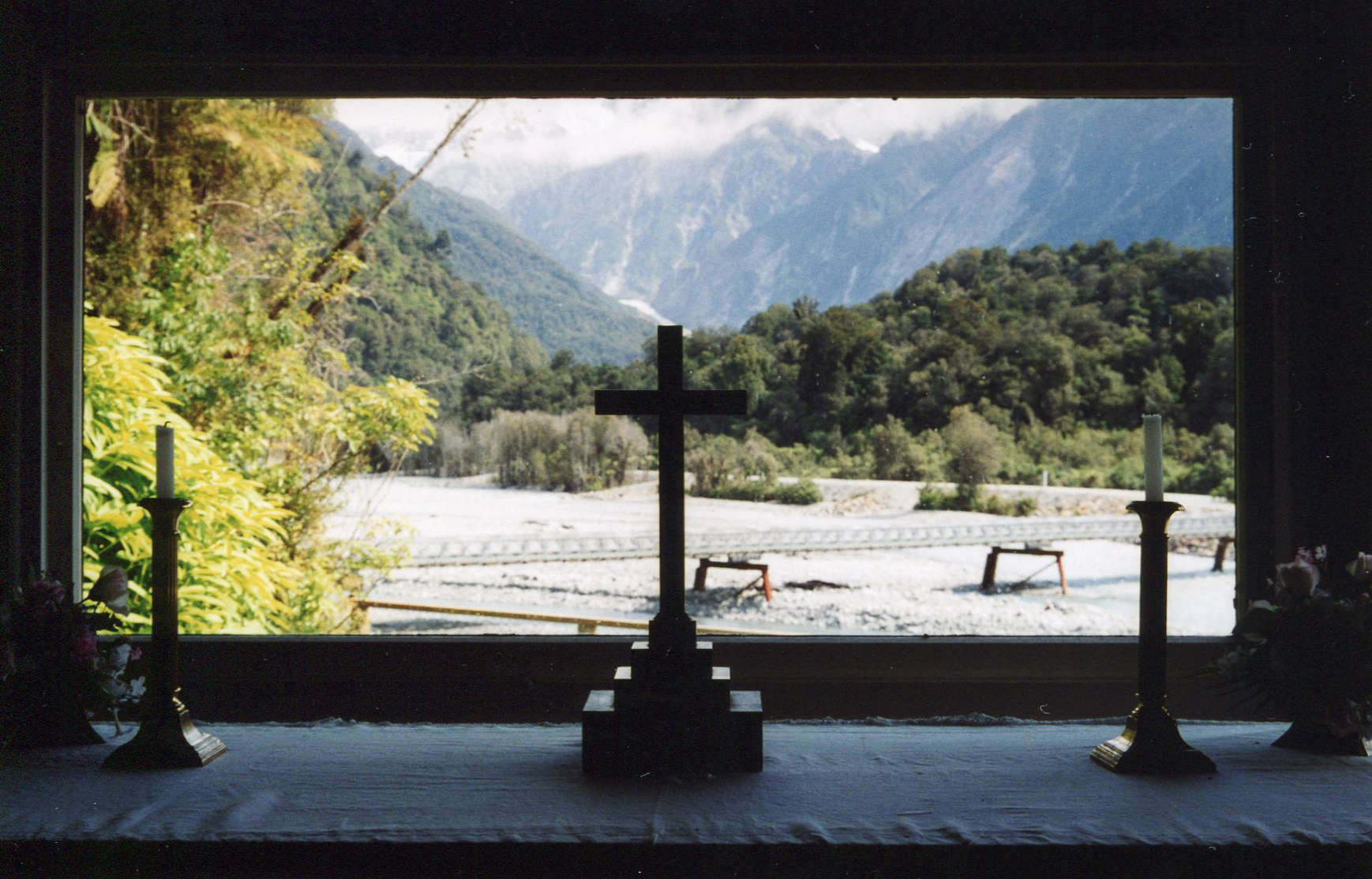
View in 1998 through the central apsidal window of St James Church, looking across the Waiho River with Franz Josef Glacier visible beyond

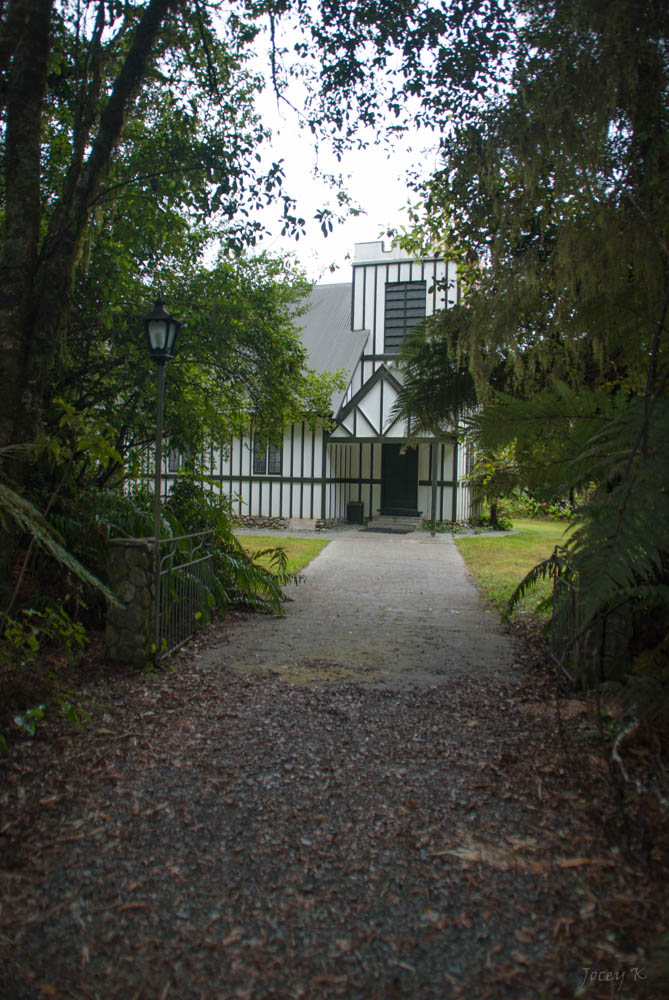
Approach down the path

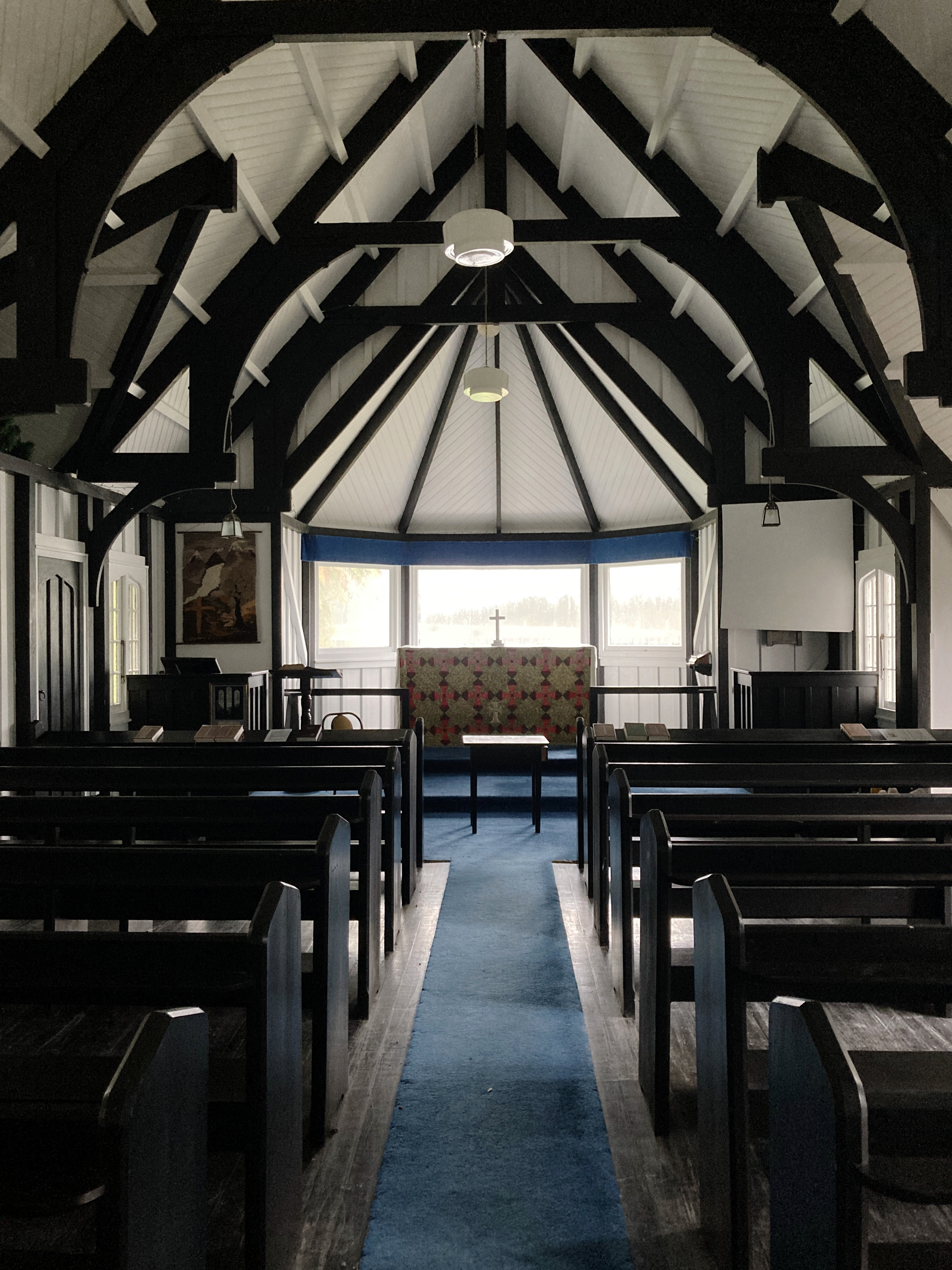
Interior

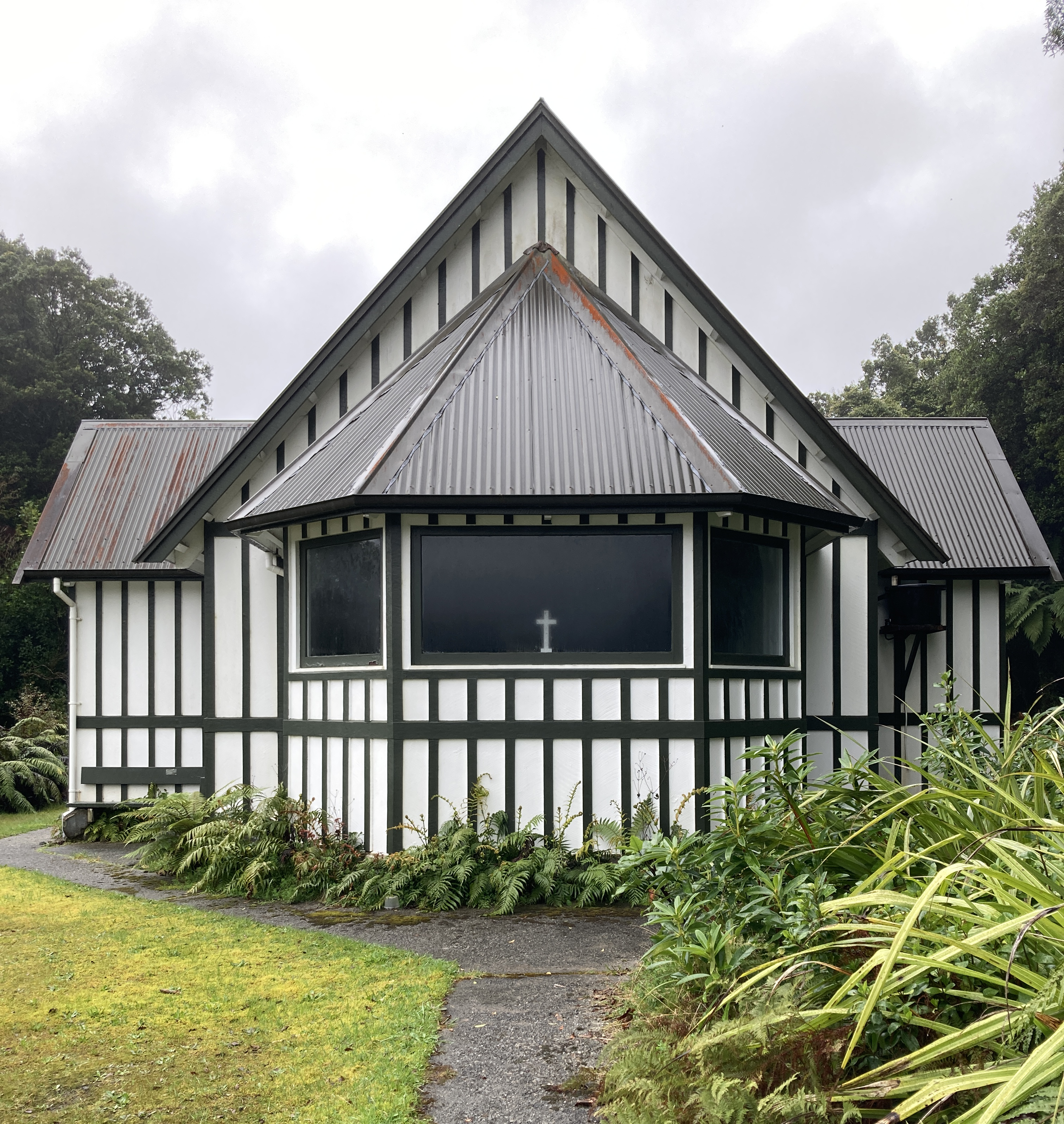
Exterior showing altar cross

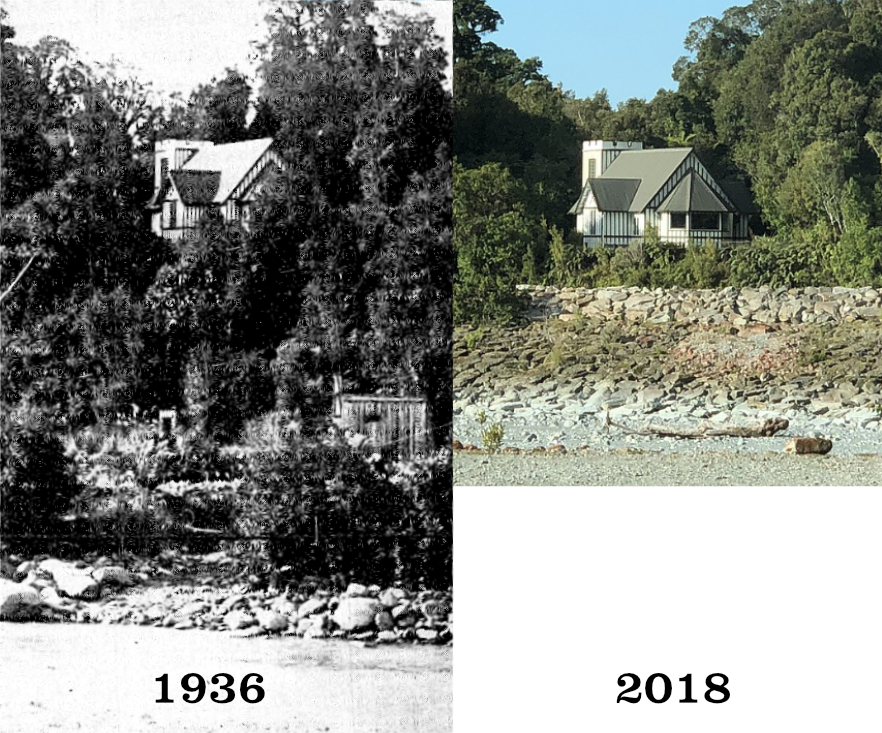
The rise of the Waiho River between 1936 and 2018 can be seen in these two photos of St James Church
