= Rose Graham (hotelier) =

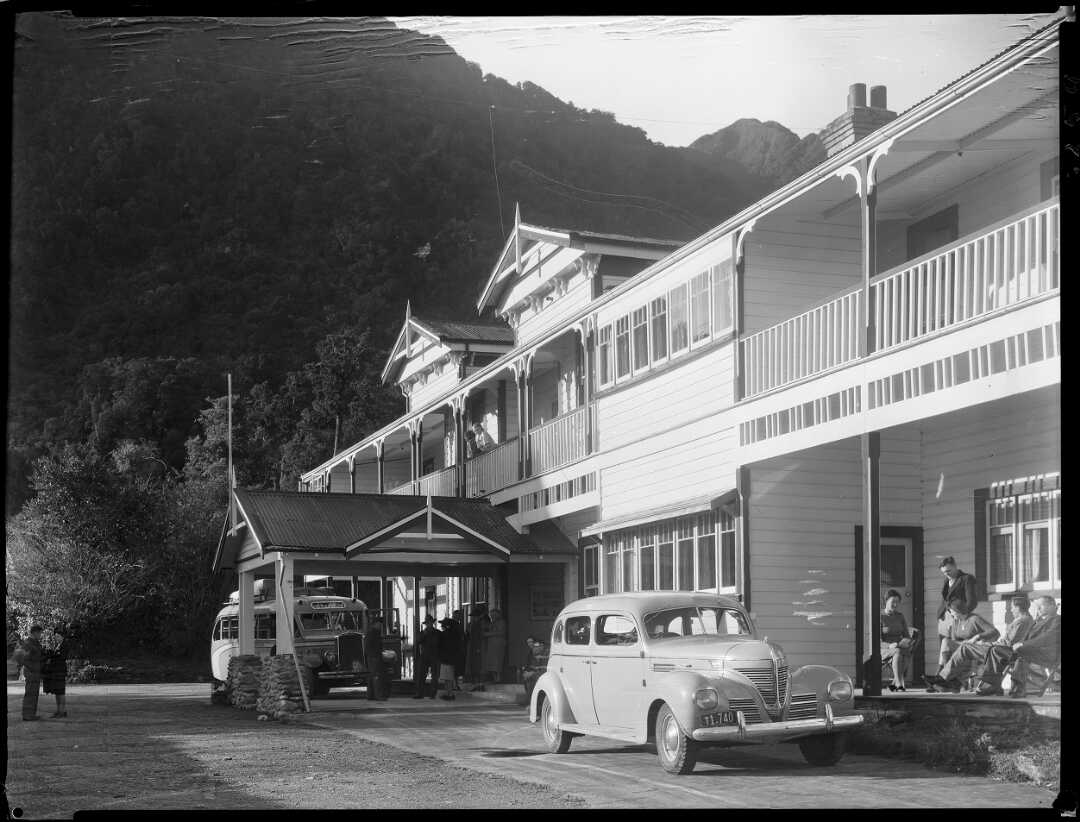
Grahams' Hotel circa 1940

Rose Graham (25 September 1879–3 February 1974) was a New Zealand homemaker and hotel-keeper. She was born in Gillespies Beach, West Coast, New Zealand on 25 September 1879. In 1911, her husband Jim Graham and his brother, Alec, bought a six-room hotel at Franz Josef, where she worked as hostess and partner until the hotel, by then expanded to cater for 120, sold to the government in 1947.
