= Alec and Peter Graham =

New Zealand mountain climbers

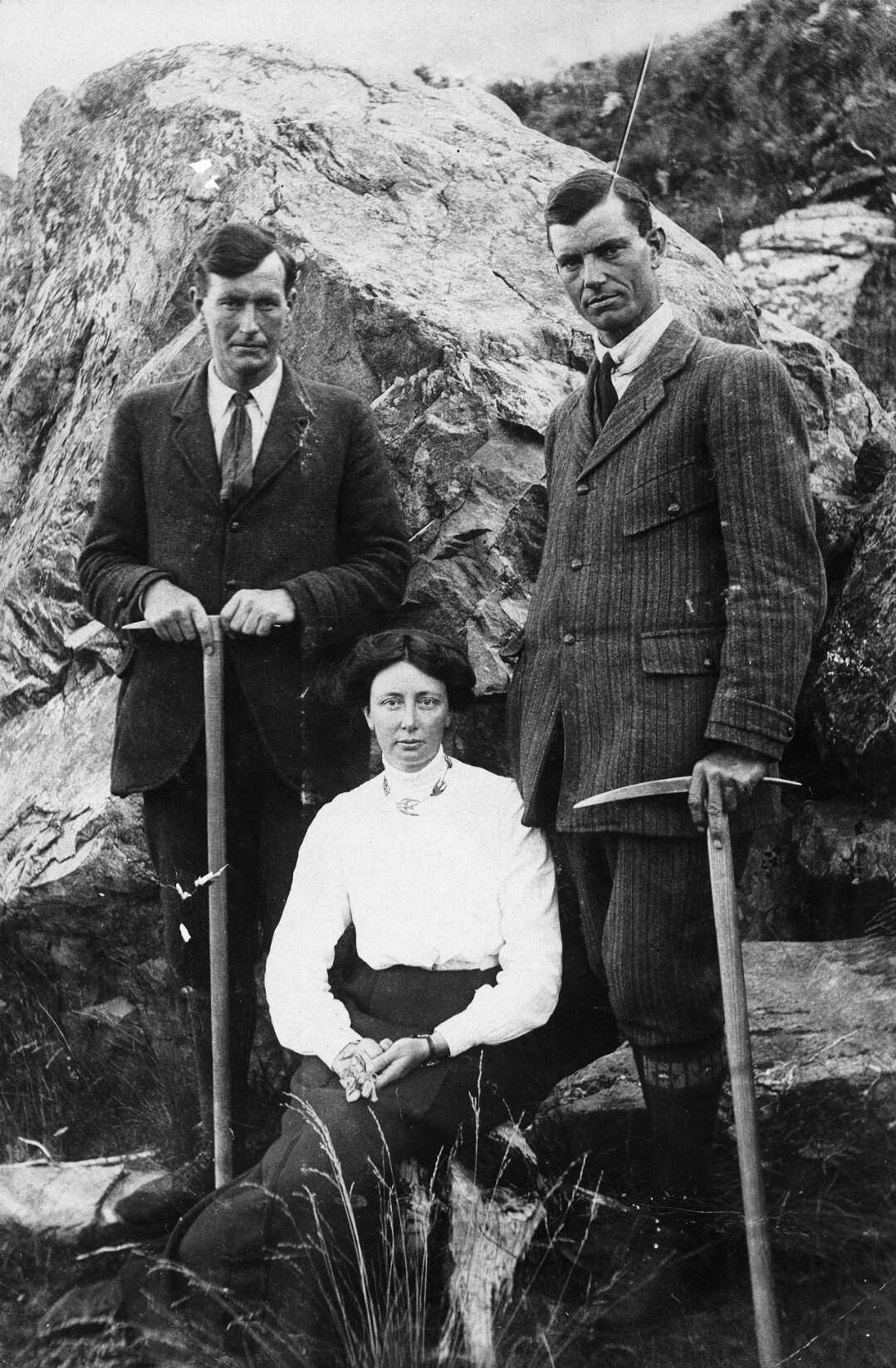
Alec and Peter Graham with Freda du Faur, the first woman to climb Mount Cook. Peter, du Faur and a chaperone made the climb together on 3 December 1910.

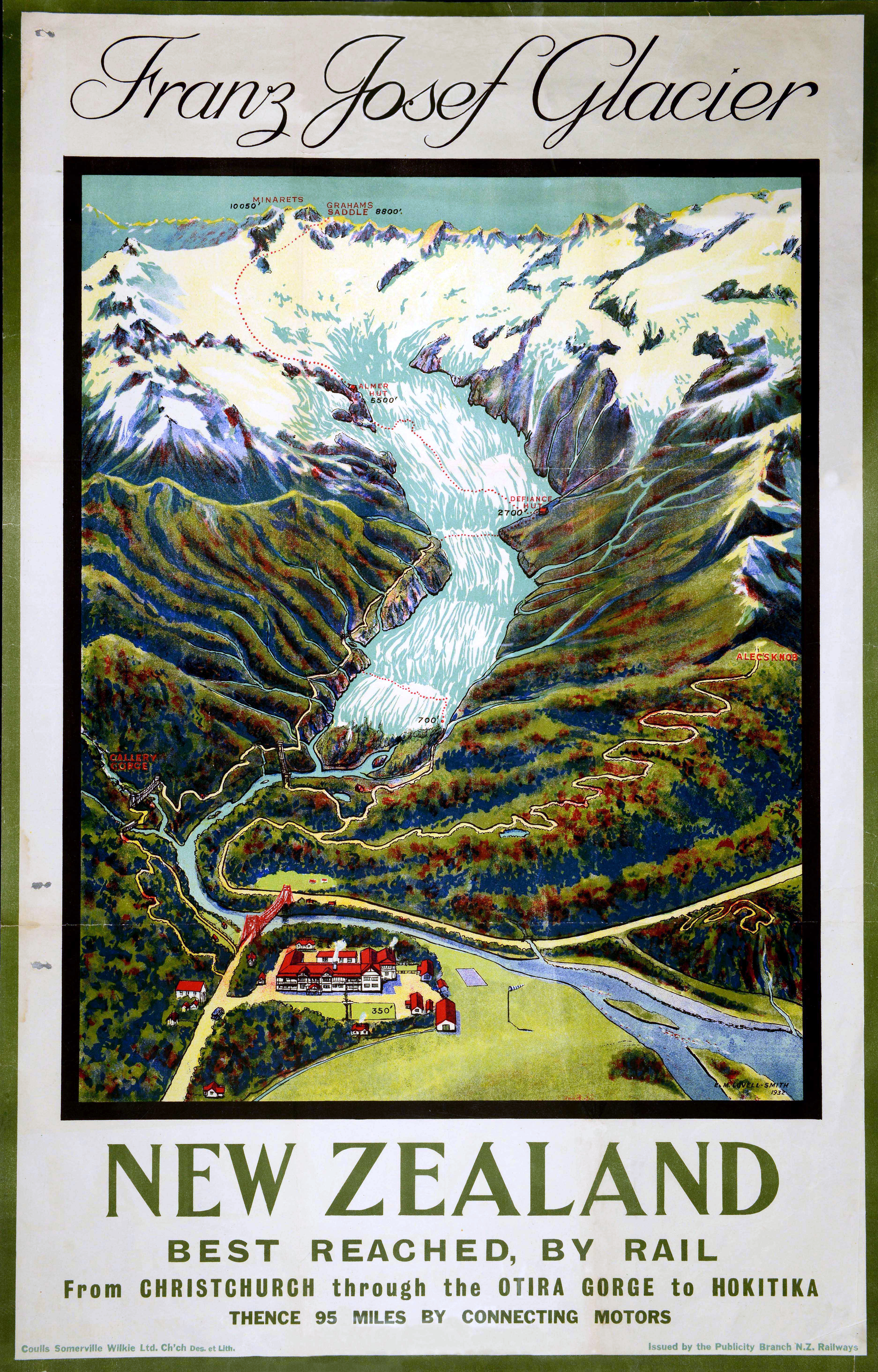
New Zealand Railway poster depicting the Grahams' hotel at the toe of the Franz Josef Glacier, 1932. Note Grahams' Saddle and Alec's Knob. The church is just in front of the nearest end of the bridge. The airfield's windsock is clearly visible

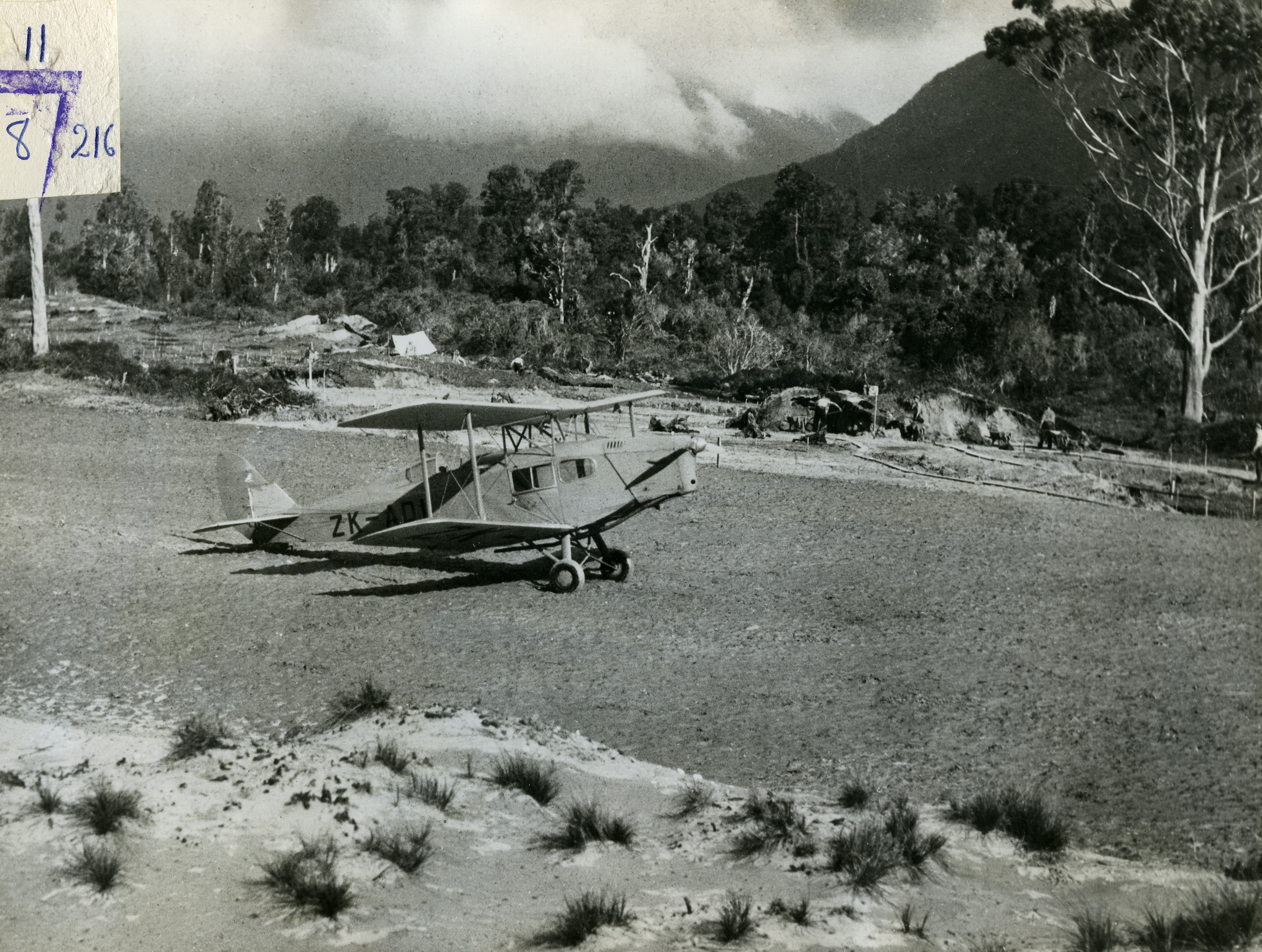
Air Travel's scheduled service

Alexander Carter Graham MM (1881–1957) and Peter Graham MBE (1878–1961) were mountaineers, guides and hotel operators in New Zealand. They were instrumental in the establishment of the early New Zealand tourist industry and earned themselves worldwide reputations as climbers and guides.

== Graham family of Ōkārito ==
Alec and Peter Graham were born at Three Mile Beach, Ōkārito, the fifth and sixth children of nurse and midwife Isabella and her husband from Paisley, Scotland, David Graham, a goldminer, storekeeper, Three Mile River ferryman and later a baker. The family made a farm at Waiho by Franz Josef Glacier.

After their father died in October 1900 four of the six sons moved away from Ōkārito and the youngest, Alec and Peter, remained at the Waiho / Waiau farm. Now on her own, Isabella, as well as nurse and midwife, was postmistress, ran a store and took in paying guests.

Alec and Peter made careers climbing and guiding visitors, and Peter joined the New Zealand Tourist and Publicity Department.

== Accommodation for climbers ==
Alec and another brother, Jim, bought the small hotel at Waiho in 1911 and five of the brothers together winched the building up to a new site above flood level. They added another storey to the building and opened it under the name Franz Josef Glacier Hotel. Jim died in 1921 and in 1923 Peter moved to Waiho to replace him, leaving his post of chief guide at Mount Cook. They further improved the hotel and generated electricity for it from the river.

The family atmosphere generated by Isabella, who died in 1918, followed by Jim's wife and then widow Rose, in addition to the Graham brothers' guiding and climbing expertise, gave the 120-guest hotel a special character that became world-renowned. Peter and Alec donated land for St James Church, although a building was not erected until 1931, when services outgrew the hotel.

=== Air Travel (NZ) ===
Access to Waiho was always tedious. A landing field was completed in 1932. The Canterbury Aero Club made open cockpit taxi flights bringing international climbers and tourists from Christchurch. With the leadership of Bert Mercer the Graham family founded what became Air Travel (NZ) Ltd to provide a regular passenger service to Waiho in a fully enclosed aircraft, Fox Moth ZK ADI, which began operations in December 1934. After the second World War Air Travel (NZ) became part of NAC and then Air New Zealand.

Alec, Rose and Peter ran the hotel for another 25 years before selling it to Tourist and Publicity (this section of Tourist and Publicity was later renamed the Tourist Hotel Corporation) and retiring in 1947. Tourist Hotel Corporation built a new hotel on the site in 1965, "the grandest on the West Coast". In March 2016 the river flooded and sent water up to two metres deep through the buildings, effectively destroying them. Little of the physical evidence of the Graham's life work remains beyond the little church.

== Recognition and legacy ==
Mount Graham, beside Mount Cook, was named on 18 January 1938 by S.B. Thompson, G.L. Clark, and Jack Cox for Peter and Alec Graham. In the 1956 Queen's Birthday Honours, Peter Graham was appointed a Member of the Order of the British Empire, in recognition of his services as a mountaineer and alpine guide.

Peter Graham had an interest in New Zealand alpine botany, sending plant specimens to Donald Petrie and taking botanists such as H.H. Allan and G.H. Cunningham into the field. Some of Peter Graham's collections are type specimens, and he has at least three flowering plants named after him, namely Ranunculus grahamii, Helichrysum grahamii, and Veronica grahamii, as well as one rust, Puccinia grahamii.

Alec's daughter Dorothy Fletcher compiled his mountaineering photographs into the Alec Graham Photographic Collection and donated this to the Macmillan Brown Library at the University of Canterbury.
