= Agassiz Glacier (New Zealand) =

Glacier in New Zealand

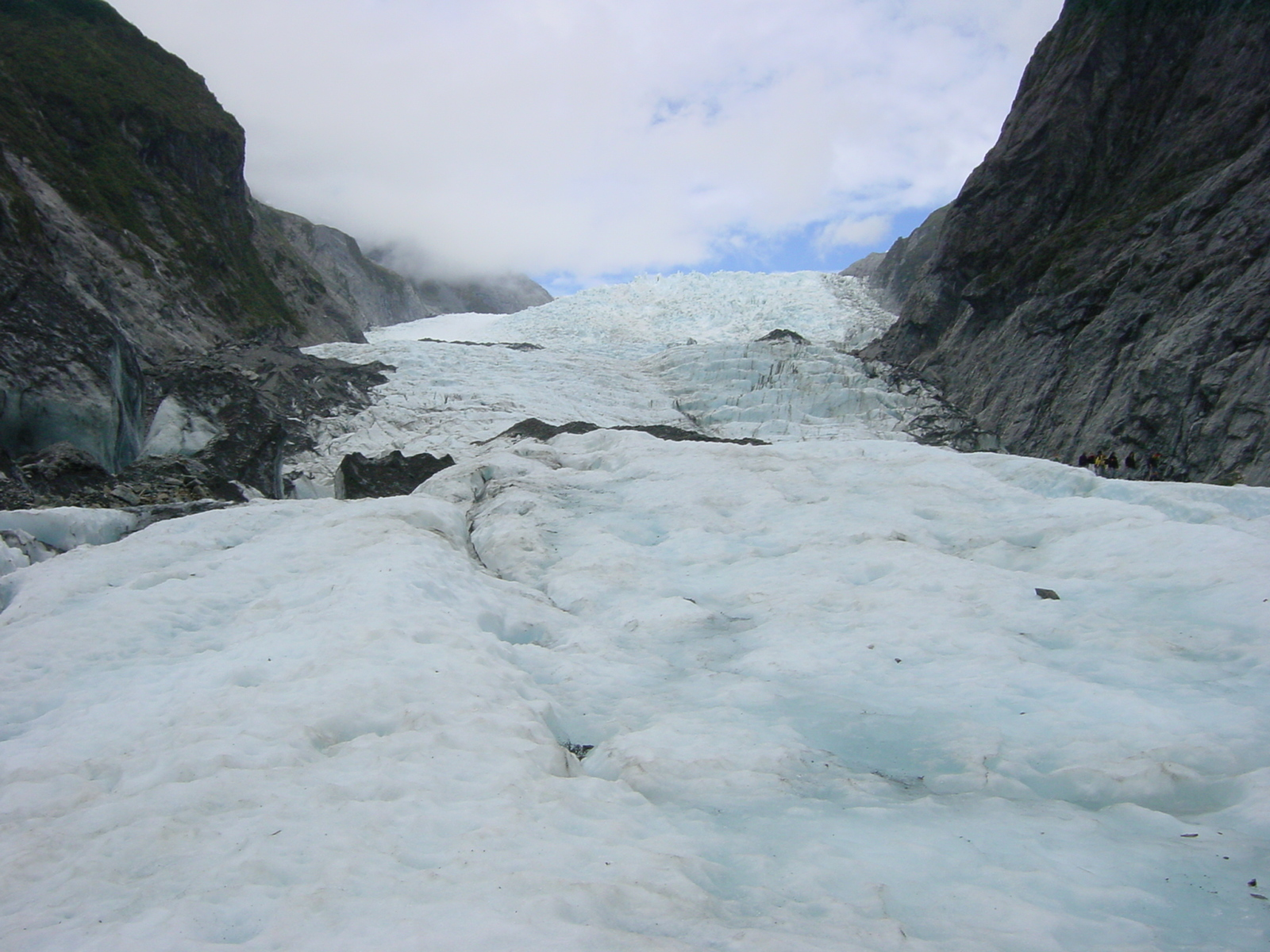
- Agassiz Glacier in 2001

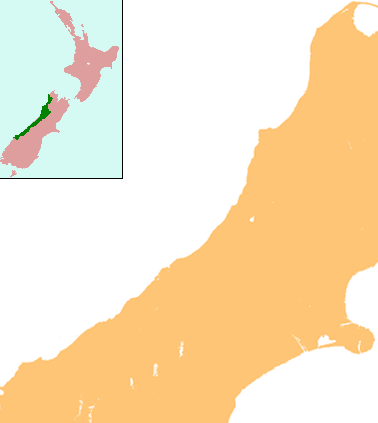
- Location within West Coast
- Location: Westland District, West Coast Region, New Zealand
- Coordinates: 43.503121°S 170.210023°E
- Terminus: Franz Josef Glacier / Kā Roimata o Hine Hukatere

The Agassiz Glacier is located near the west coast of New Zealand's South Island. The Agassiz Glacier is a tributary of the larger Franz Josef Glacier, and is itself fed by the Chamberlin Snowfield and the Davis Snowfield. It is named after Louis Agassiz, a Swiss-American glaciologist, and was discovered and named by the German geologist, Sir Johann "Julius" von Haast.

In 2015, the glacier was informally 'unnamed' as part of a worldwide campaign to disassociate Agassiz's name from various geographic features and, in this instance, to replace it with a relevant Māori name.
