= Waiho River =

River in New Zealand

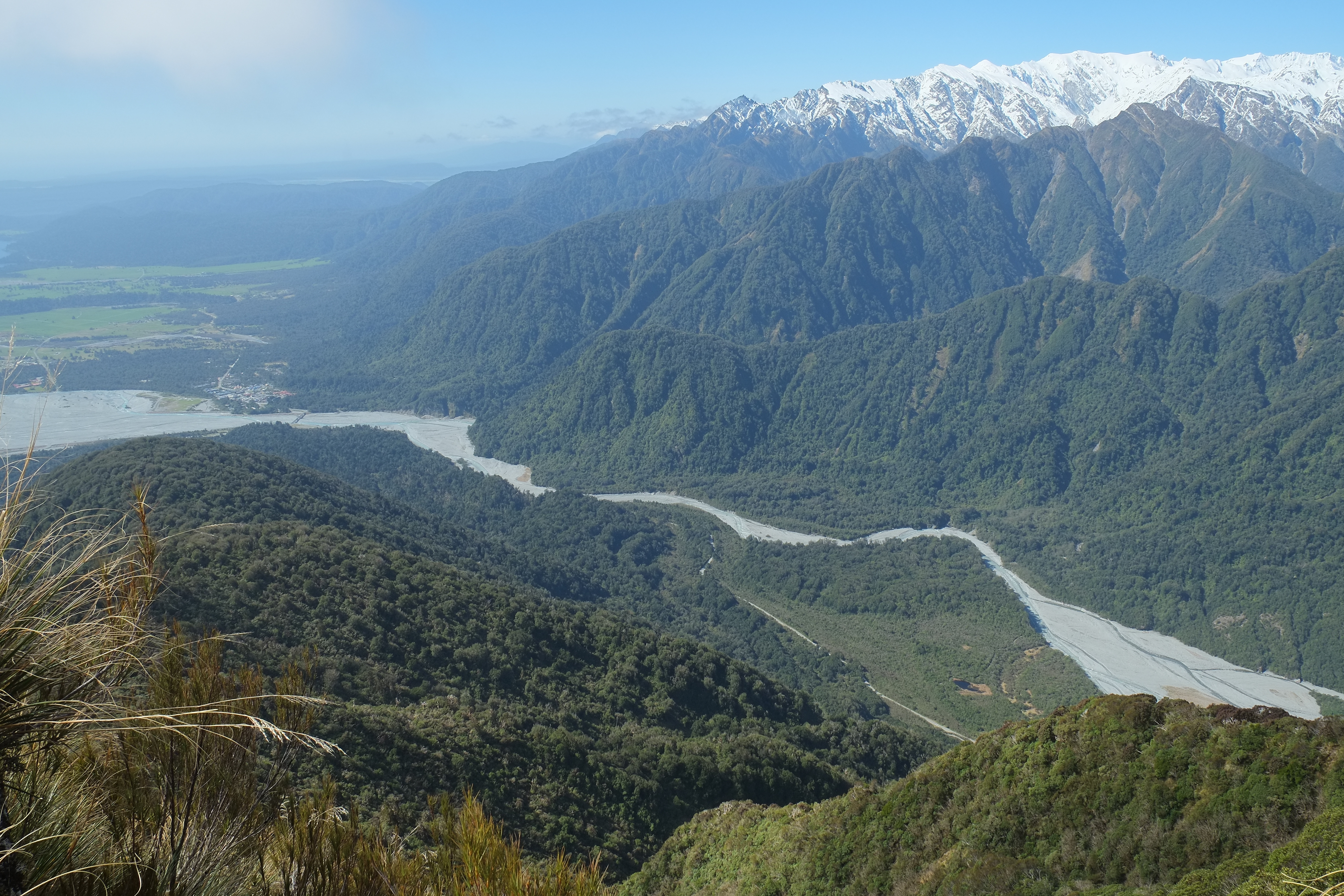
- Waiho River flowing out of the Franz Josef Glacier valley
- Route of the Waiho River
- Mouth of the Waiho River Waiho River (New Zealand)

Location
- Country: New Zealand
- Region: West Coast
- District: Westland

Physical characteristics
- Source: Franz Josef Glacier
  - location: Southern Alps / Kā Tiritiri o te Moana
  - coordinates: 43.4497°S 170.1755°E
- Mouth: Tasman Sea
  - coordinates: 43°17′11″S 170°03′03″E
- Length: 25 km (16 mi)

Basin features
- Progression: Franz Josef Glacier → Waiho River → Tasman Sea
- River system: Waiho River
- Tributaries
  - left: Trident Creek, Dolly Creek, Callery River, Docherty Creek
  - right: Rope Creek, Arch Creek, Hugh Creek, Duck Creek, Park Creek, Tatare Stream

The Waiho River (traditionally the Waiau River) is a river of the West Coast region of New Zealand's South Island. It is a braided river fed by the meltwater of the Franz Josef Glacier and skirts the main township of Franz Josef to its south, where its riverbed is crossed by SH 6 on a long single-lane bridge. The river merges with Docherty Creek just before reaching the Tasman Sea 10 kilometres (6.2 mi) southwest of Ōkārito.

Waiho River flows from the Southern Alps forming a steep alluvial fan. The river is approximately 16 kilometres (9.9 mi) long. Due to seasonal changes in rainfall and snow melt, the river's water flow varies greatly.

Since at least the first aerial imagery taken in 1948, the elevation of the riverbed has been increasing, due to aggradation. This process has become more rapid since the 1980s, and the presence of stopbanks has accelerated it beyond natural aggradation rates. It now sits around 2 metres (6.6 ft) higher than the level of the nearby township.

In a severe rain storm on 26 March 2019, the bridge was destroyed after 400 millimetres (16 in) of rain had fallen. The bridge and one abutment was rebuilt, and the road link reopened after 18 days. The works cost NZ$6m.

The Waiho Technical Advisory Group have warned that flooding of the river poses a risk to life and property, due to gravel build up from the retreating of Franz Josef Glacier, which has caused the riverbed to rise by 20 cm (7.9 in) a year. The changing course of the river has led to calls for a managed retreat of the area.

== Gallery ==
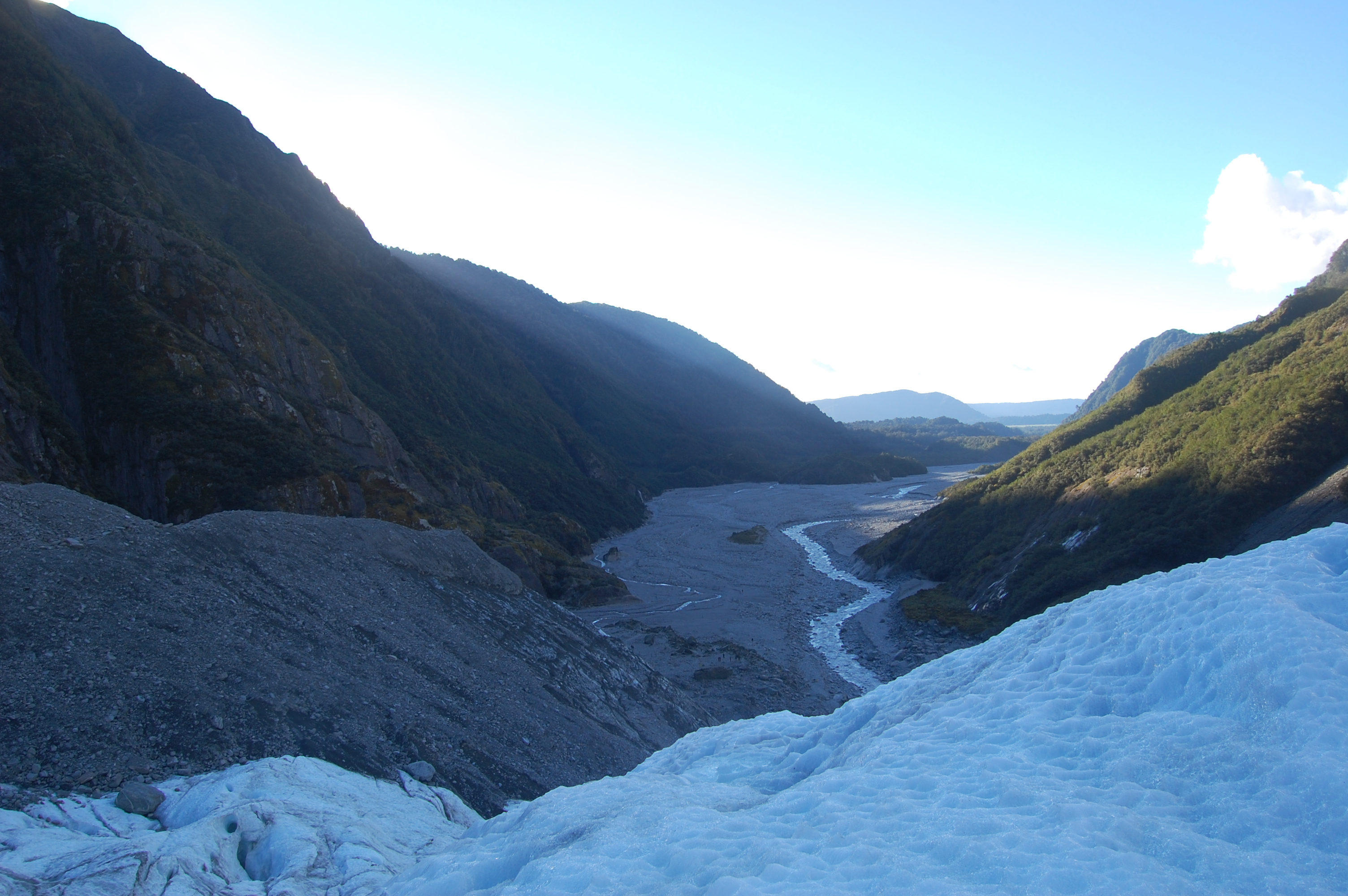
The origin of the river is at Franz Josef Glacier

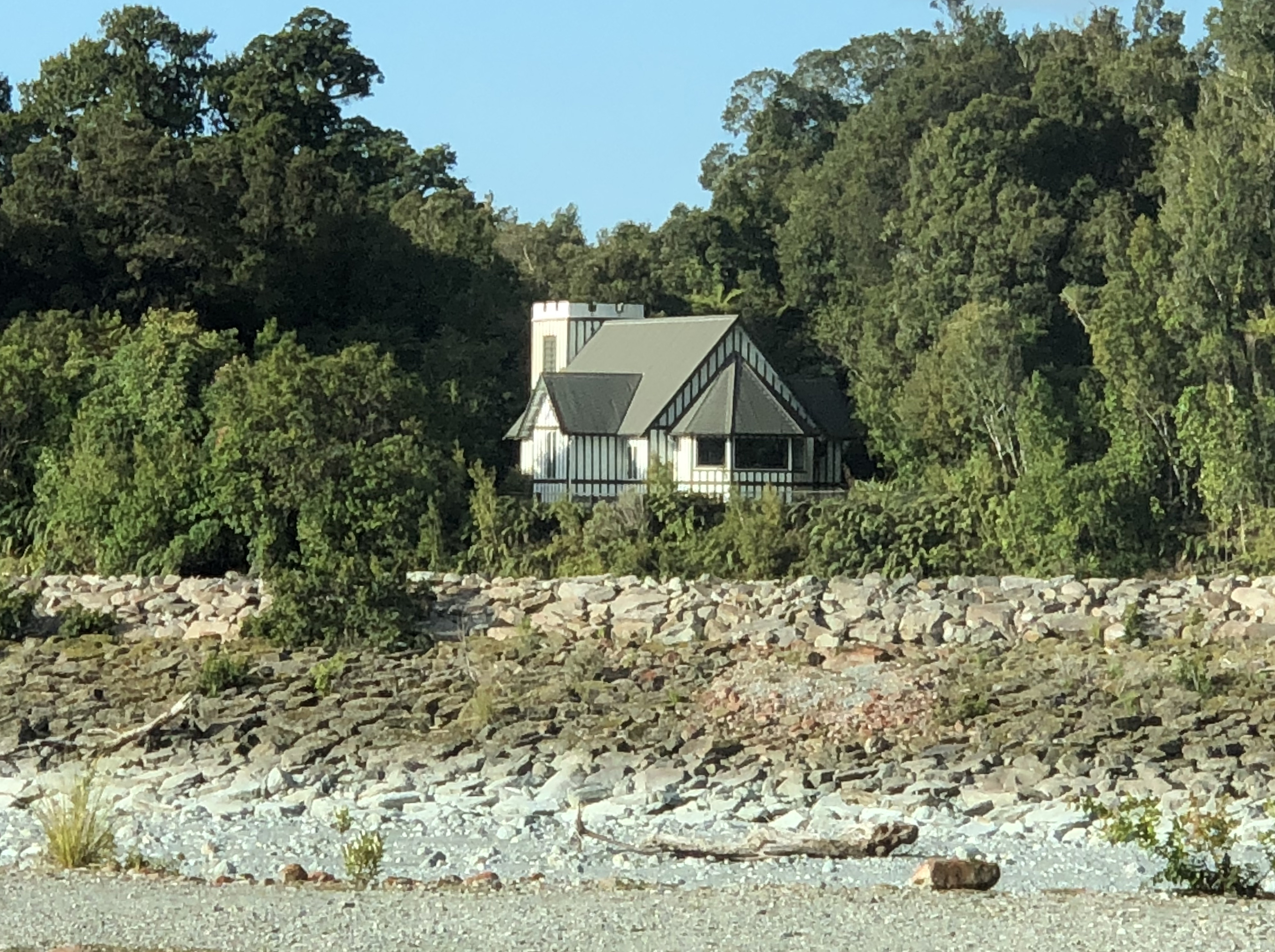
The Waiho River flows through the town of Franz Josef, passing features such as the St James Church

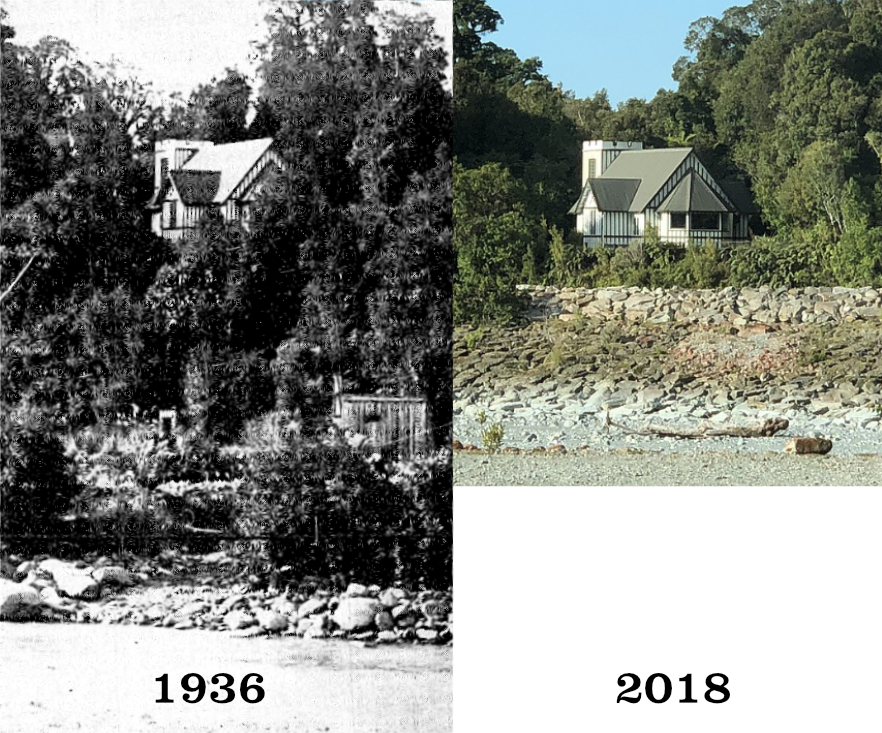
The rise of the Waiho River bed between 1936 and 2018

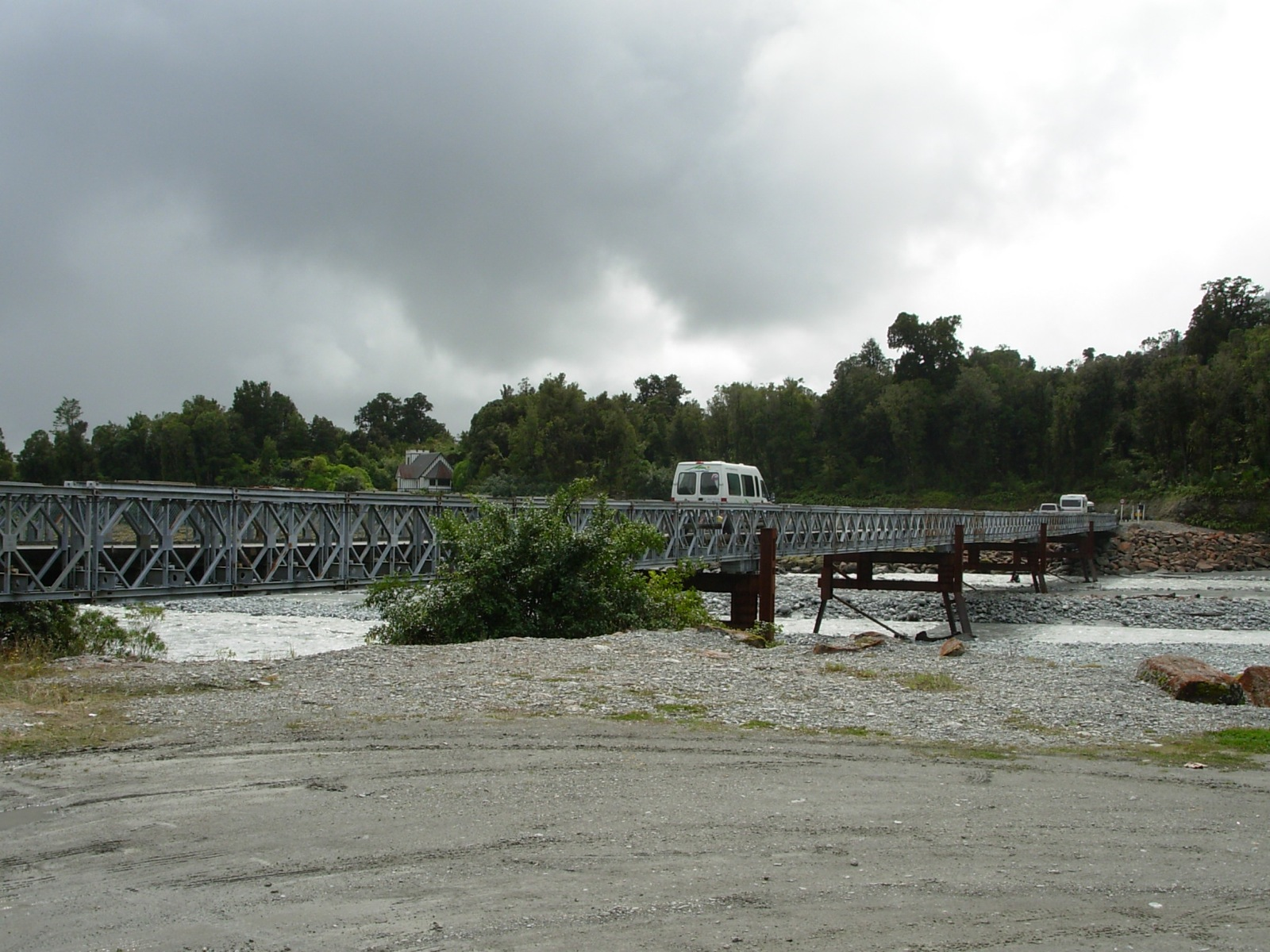
The Waiho Bridge was destroyed in 2019

== See also ==
- List of rivers of New Zealand
