= Franz Josef / Waiau =

Town in the West Coast Region of New Zealand

- Village
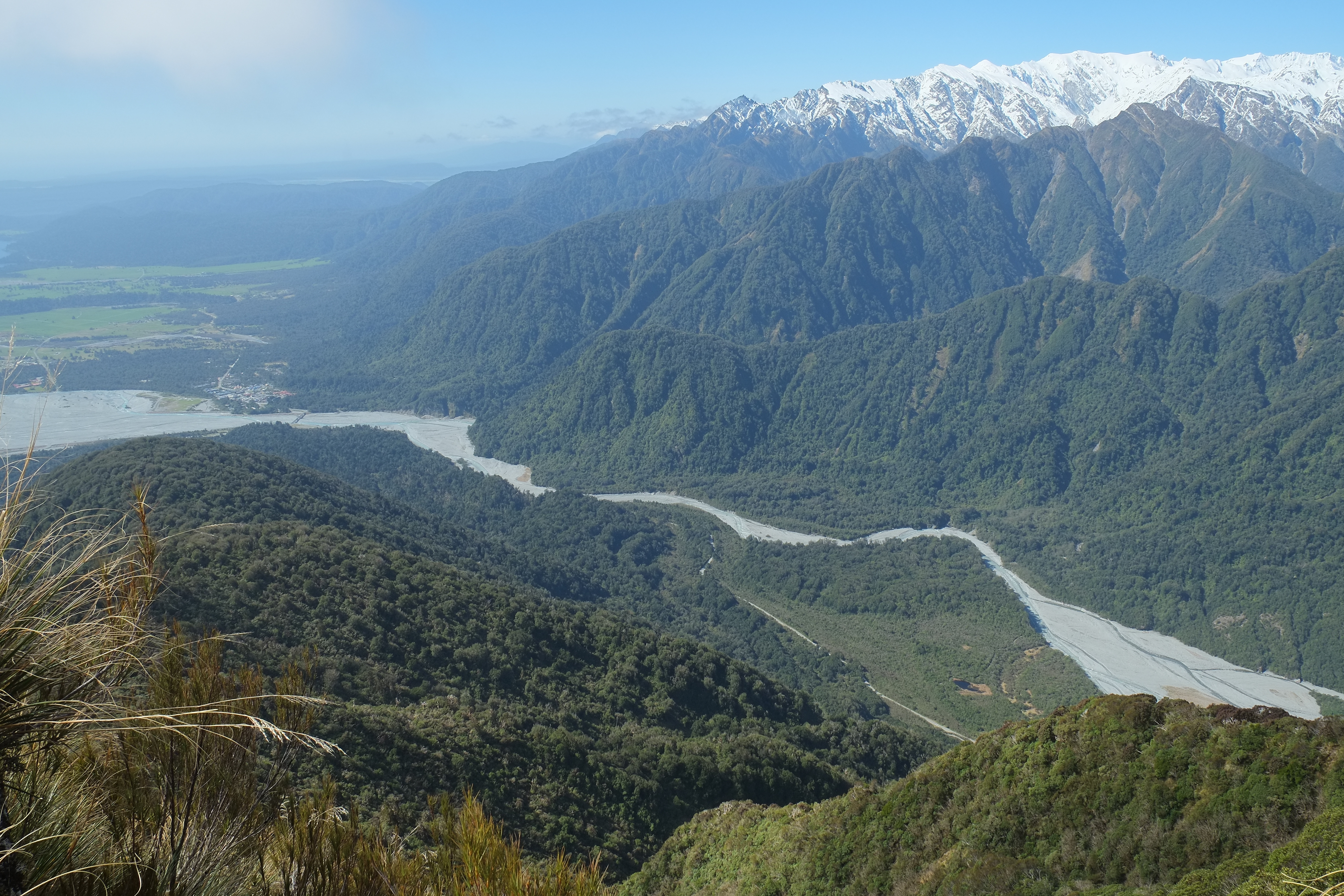
- Franz Josef (middle left), next to the Waiho River, as seen from Alex Knob
- Interactive map of Franz Josef / Waiau
- Coordinates: 43°23′17″S 170°10′55″E
- Country: New Zealand
- Region: West Coast
- District: Westland District
- Ward: Southern
- Electorates: West Coast-Tasman; Te Tai Tonga

Government
  - Territorial Authority: Westland District Council
  - Regional council: West Coast Regional Council
  - Mayor of Westland: Helen Lash
  - West Coast-Tasman MP: Maureen Pugh
  - Te Tai Tonga MP: Tākuta Ferris

Area
  - Total: 5.31 km^{2} (2.05 sq mi)

Population (June 2025)
  - Total: 440
  - Density: 83/km^{2} (210/sq mi)
- Time zone: UTC+12 (NZST)
  - Summer (DST): UTC+13 (NZDT)
- Postcode: 7886
- Area code: 03
- Local iwi: Ngāi Tahu

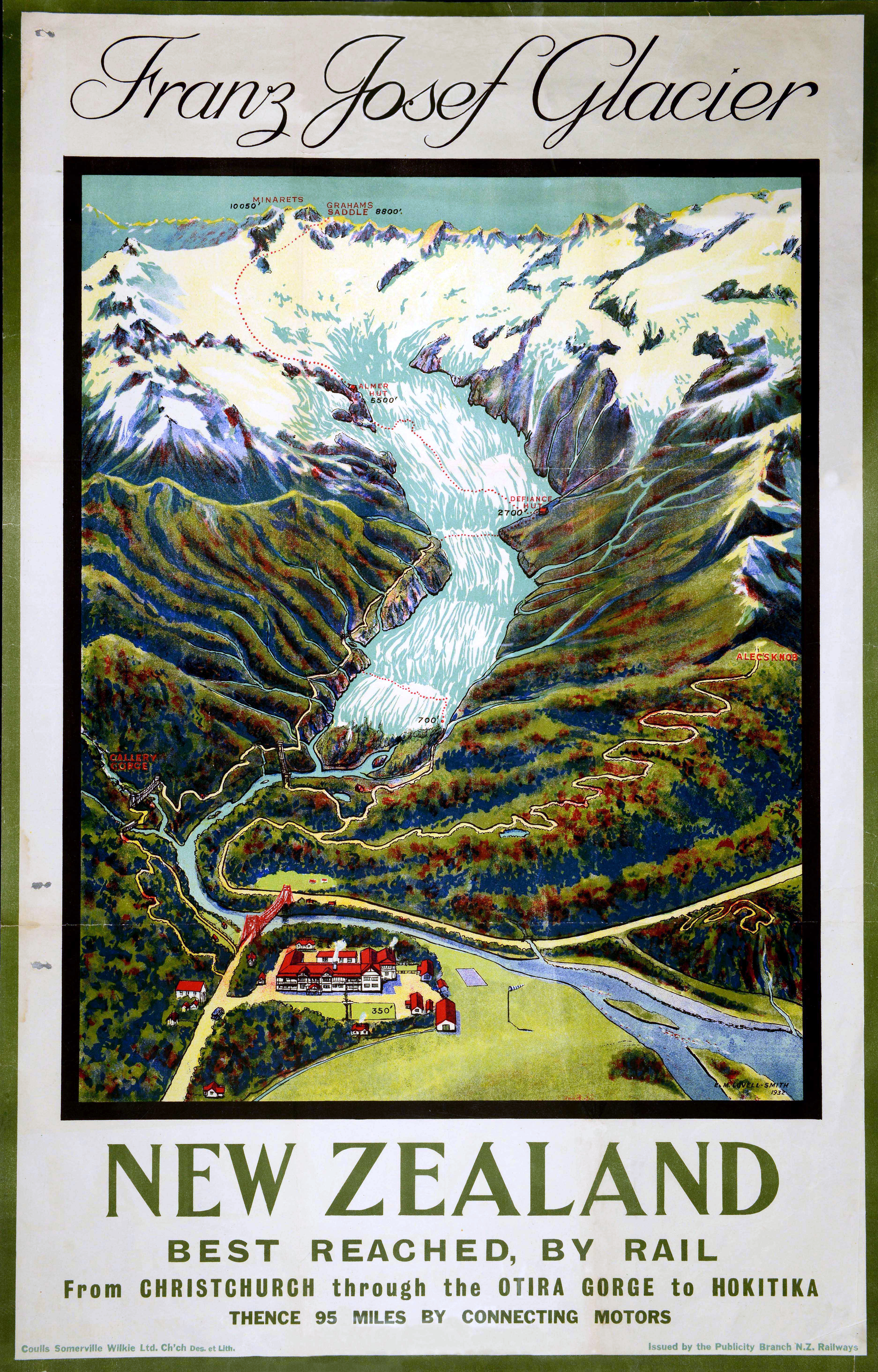
Grahams Hotel at the toe of the Franz Josef Glacier, 1932. Established about 1911 by the Graham brothers and run by them it was sold to the New Zealand Government in 1947

Franz Josef (officially Franz Josef / Waiau) is a small town in the West Coast region of the South Island of New Zealand. Whataroa is 32 kilometres (20 mi) to the north-east, and the township of Fox Glacier is 23 kilometres (14 mi) to the south-west. The Waiho River runs from the Franz Josef Glacier to the south, through the town, and into the Tasman Sea to the north-west.

== Name ==
Local Māori called the area Waiau, which means swirling waters. In the 1860s Sir Julius von Haast named the Franz Josef Glacier in honour of the Emperor of Austria Franz Joseph I of Austria. Though, the glacier and town should have been spelled with a "ph", the area was often misspelled with an "f" and the misspelling gradually became common usage. The town Franz Josef was then named after the glacier.

Following the passage of the Ngāi Tahu Claims Settlement Act 1998, the name of the town was officially altered to Franz Josef / Waiau.

== Geography ==
=== Flood protection ===
The bed of the Waiho River (also spelled Waiau) has significantly risen over the years, and increased rainfall and snow melt from the retreating glacier has caused the river's water flow to vary greatly. The riverbed is currently predicted to rise 2 m every 10 years, and in 30 years will be higher than the town itself. A flood in February 2016 caused $30 million of damage. In a severe rain storm on 26 March 2019, 400 millimetres (16 in) of rain fell and the bridge over the Waiho, the only road connection to south Westland, was destroyed. The town was flooded and hundreds were evacuated. The bridge and one abutment was rebuilt and the road link reopened after 18 days at a cost of NZ$6m.

Flood protection was deemed a priority for the township of Franz Josef, and a $24m package was approved by the Government in July 2020, as part of the COVID-19 economic stimulus package. The work included $18m for rock embankments on the north and south banks, and $3.8m to raise the level of the highway bridge. The work had not begun as of January 2021, leading to criticism from National MP Maureen Pugh and Regional Council head Allan Birchfield. MP Damien O'Connor said "piling more rocks around the river" was not a long-term solution.

One proposal made in a 2017 report was to remove embankments on the river's southern bank, allowing it to widen and flood several thousand hectares of farmland. This would affect 82 people and 40 properties, who would need compensation by central government. In September 2021, $400,000 of emergency work was approved on the southern bank stopbank.

Another proposal for the future of Franz Josef is to relocate the entire town away from the flood danger and the alpine fault to the shore of Lake Mapourika, 10 km north of the town. The estimated cost for this is $300–$600 million, or as high as $1 billion.

== Demographics ==
Franz Josef is described by Stats NZ as a rural settlement and covers 5.31 km^{2} (2.05 sq mi). It had an estimated population of 440 as of June 2025, with a population density of 83 inhabitants per square kilometre (210/sq mi). The settlement is part of the larger Westland Glaciers-Bruce Bay statistical area.

Historical population for Franz Josef
Year	Pop.	±% p.a.
2006	303	—
2013	327	+1.09%
2018	483	+8.11%
2023	363	−5.55%

Franz Josef had a population of 363 in the 2023 New Zealand census, a decrease of 120 people (−24.8%) since the 2018 census, and an increase of 36 people (11.0%) since the 2013 census. There were 180 males, 177 females, and 3 people of other genders in 171 dwellings. 5.8% of people identified as LGBTIQ+. The median age was 33.8 years (compared with 38.1 years nationally). There were 33 people (9.1%) aged under 15 years, 108 (29.8%) aged 15 to 29, 195 (53.7%) aged 30 to 64, and 30 (8.3%) aged 65 or older.

People could identify as more than one ethnicity. The results were 63.6% European (Pākehā); 11.6% Māori; 6.6% Pasifika; 25.6% Asian; 1.7% Middle Eastern, Latin American and African New Zealanders (MELAA); and 4.1% other, which includes people giving their ethnicity as "New Zealander". English was spoken by 96.7%, Māori by 2.5%, Samoan by 3.3%, and other languages by 23.1%. No language could be spoken by 1.7% (e.g. too young to talk). The percentage of people born overseas was 47.9, compared with 28.8% nationally.

Religious affiliations were 31.4% Christian, 4.1% Hindu, 1.7% Buddhist, and 1.7% other religions. People who answered that they had no religion were 56.2%, and 6.6% of people did not answer the census question.

Of those at least 15 years old, 72 (21.8%) people had a bachelor's or higher degree, 147 (44.5%) had a post-high school certificate or diploma, and 111 (33.6%) people exclusively held high school qualifications. The median income was $38,200, compared with $41,500 nationally. 12 people (3.6%) earned over $100,000 compared to 12.1% nationally. The employment status of those at least 15 was 255 (77.3%) full-time, 27 (8.2%) part-time, and 3 (0.9%) unemployed.

Although Franz Josef has only 330 local ratepayers, it regularly received 600,000 tourist visitors a year until the COVID-19 epidemic restricted travel to New Zealand.

=== Westland Glaciers-Bruce Bay statistical area ===
Westland Glaciers-Bruce Bay, which also includes Fox Glacier, covers 3,057.44 km^{2} (1,180.48 sq mi) and had an estimated population of 970 as of June 2025, with a population density of 0.32 inhabitants per square kilometre (0.83/sq mi).

Historical population for Westland Glaciers-Bruce Bay
Year	Pop.	±% p.a.
2006	963	—
2013	876	−1.34%
2018	1,074	+4.16%
2023	816	−5.35%

Westland Glaciers-Bruce Bay had a population of 816 in the 2023 New Zealand census, a decrease of 258 people (−24.0%) since the 2018 census, and a decrease of 60 people (−6.8%) since the 2013 census. There were 420 males, 393 females, and 6 people of other genders in 429 dwellings. 4.0% of people identified as LGBTIQ+. The median age was 38.3 years (compared with 38.1 years nationally). There were 81 people (9.9%) aged under 15 years, 174 (21.3%) aged 15 to 29, 456 (55.9%) aged 30 to 64, and 105 (12.9%) aged 65 or older.

People could identify as more than one ethnicity. The results were 72.8% European (Pākehā); 11.8% Māori; 4.4% Pasifika; 15.4% Asian; 2.6% Middle Eastern, Latin American and African New Zealanders (MELAA); and 4.4% other, which includes people giving their ethnicity as "New Zealander". English was spoken by 96.7%, Māori by 3.3%, Samoan by 2.9%, and other languages by 16.9%. No language could be spoken by 1.5% (e.g. too young to talk). New Zealand Sign Language was known by 0.4%. The percentage of people born overseas was 37.5, compared with 28.8% nationally.

Religious affiliations were 32.0% Christian, 1.8% Hindu, 0.7% Māori religious beliefs, 1.5% Buddhist, 0.4% New Age, 0.4% Jewish, and 0.7% other religions. People who answered that they had no religion were 56.6%, and 6.6% of people did not answer the census question.

Of those at least 15 years old, 144 (19.6%) people had a bachelor's or higher degree, 357 (48.6%) had a post-high school certificate or diploma, and 231 (31.4%) people exclusively held high school qualifications. The median income was $37,100, compared with $41,500 nationally. 39 people (5.3%) earned over $100,000 compared to 12.1% nationally. The employment status of those at least 15 was 525 (71.4%) full-time, 72 (9.8%) part-time, and 6 (0.8%) unemployed.

== Tourism ==
The glacier's terminal face is 5 kilometres (3 mi) from the town and its accessibility makes it a major tourist attraction and the reason many people visit Franz Josef. The town is within the Westland Tai Poutini National Park.

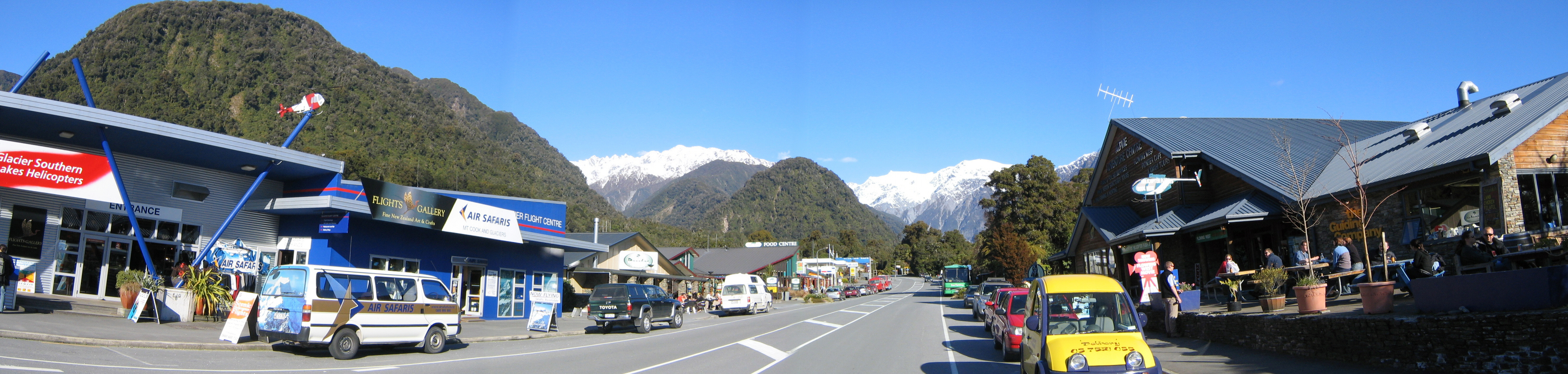
State Highway 6 running through Franz Josef

Franz Josef offers many accommodation options for the up to 2,000 people staying overnight during the main season, ranging from hotels and motels to holiday houses, camping sites and backpacker accommodation. Other amenities include a petrol station, small but busy heliport and a number of restaurants and shops. The village is connected to the Franz Josef Glacier valley via walking tracks and a small sealed road leading into the valley from the highway just south of the village.

Franz Josef village is also home to the West Coast Wildlife Centre, a public/private partnership with the Department of Conservation and local iwi, dedicated to the hatching and incubation of the world's two rarest species of kiwi, the rowi and Haast tokoeka. The centre is open from 8.30am daily and offers a 24-hour general pass as well as VIP guided backstage pass tours for behind-the-scenes tours of its kiwi hatching and rearing facilities.

== Churches ==
=== St James Church ===
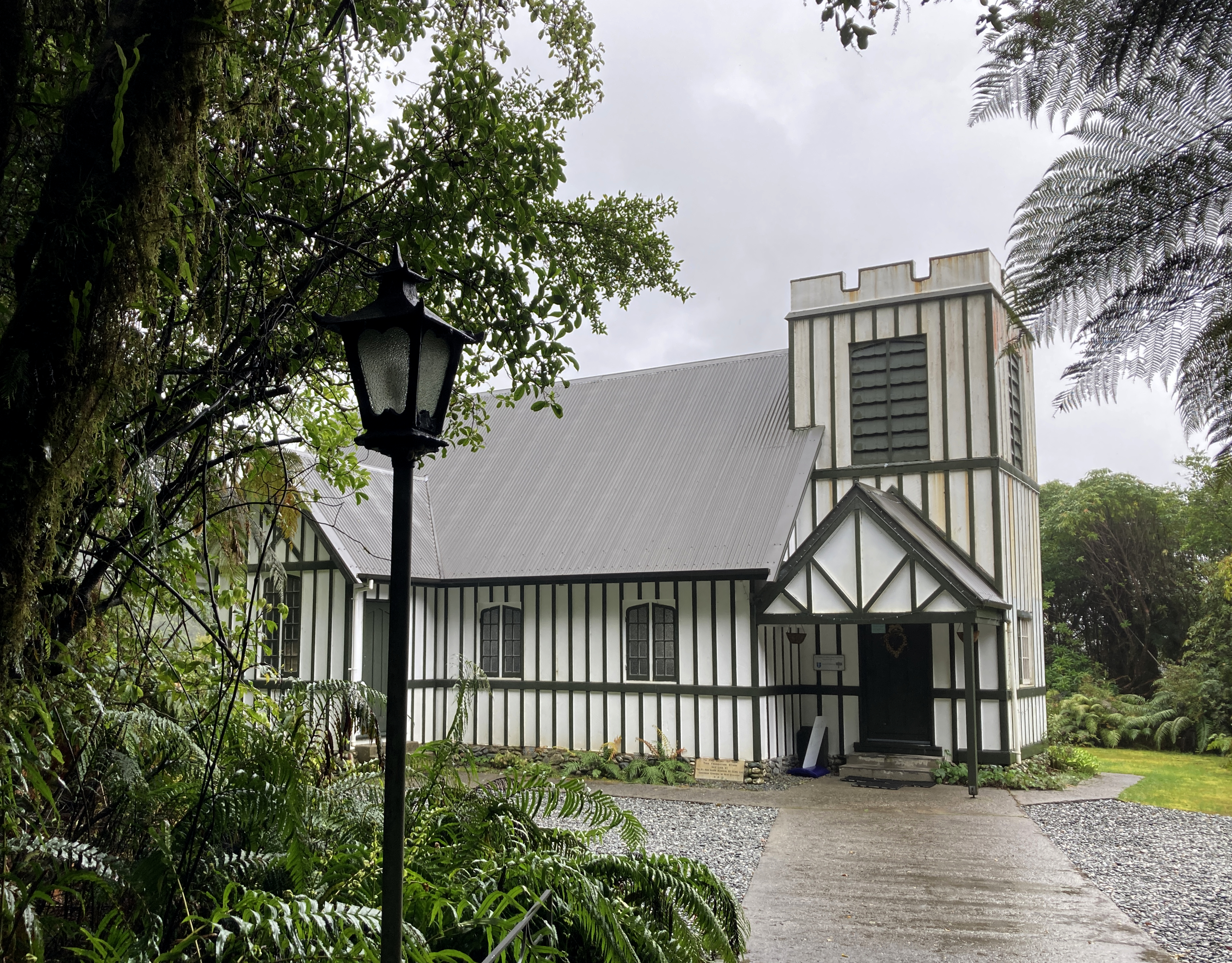
St James Church, 2020

St James Church is a small Anglican church in a bush setting overlooking the Waiho River to the south of Franz Josef township, within the Ross and South Westland Parish. Opened in 1931, the church is notable for its use of clear glass windows behind the altar giving views of the river, mountains and bush beyond. At times during the church's history, Franz Josef Glacier has been visible through the altar window. St James Church was designated as a category 1 historic place by Heritage New Zealand in 1990.

=== Our Lady of the Alps ===
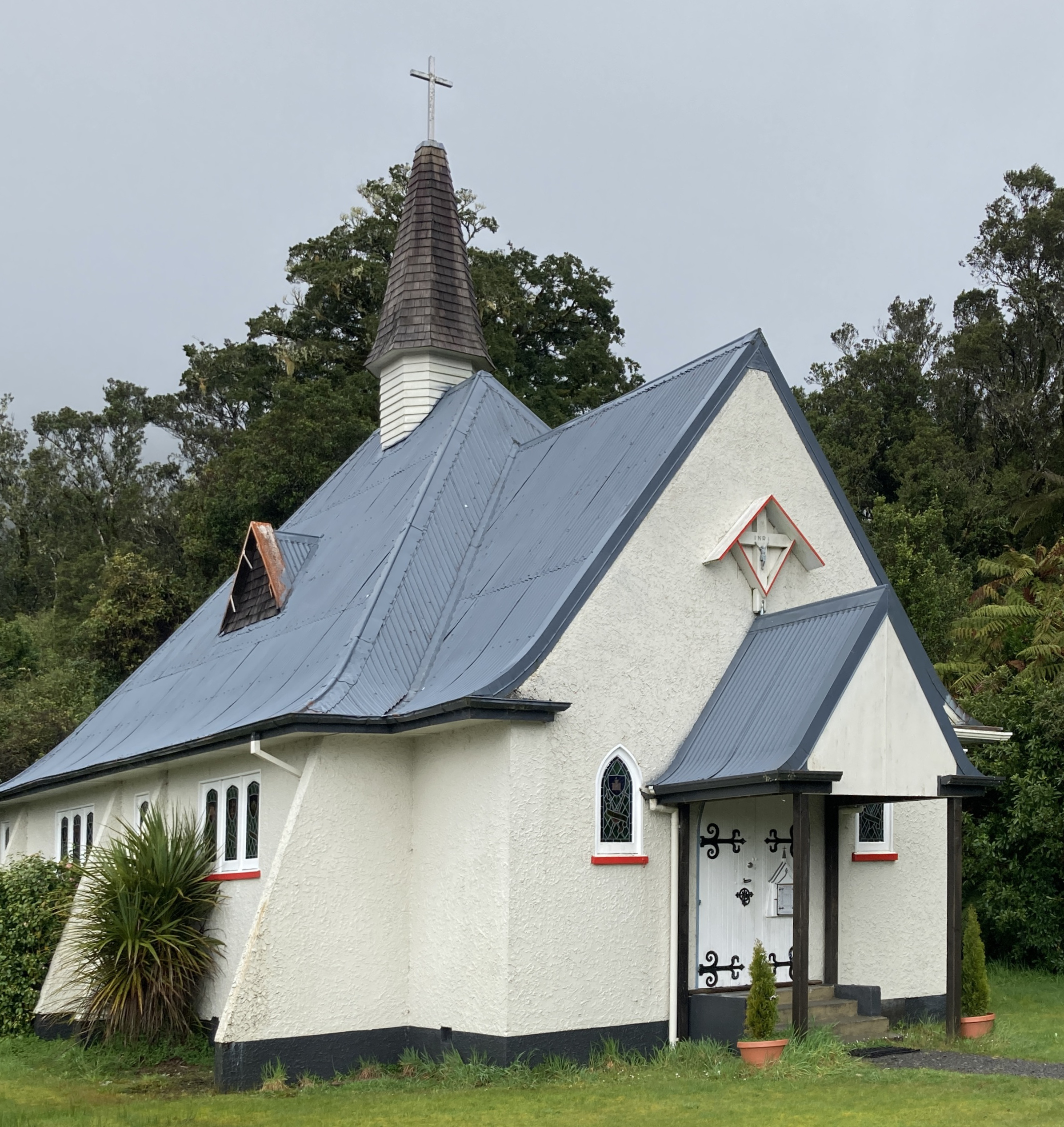
Our Lady of the Alps, 2020

Our Lady of the Alps is a small Catholic church next to State Highway 6 on the southern fringe of Franz Josef, within the South Westland parish of Our Lady of the Woods. The church was dedicated, blessed and opened on 23 December 1951. It is similar in style to Swiss mountain churches with a steeply pitched roof to shed snow, and has prominent buttresses. The porch includes two St Bernard stained-glass windows, one depicting a coil of rope with an ice pick and ski pole crossed, and the other crossed skis and a shield with a flask of brandy and a loaf of bread.

Mass is held at Our Lady of the Alps weekly, on the first and third Sundays and second fourth and fifth Saturdays of each month.

== Transport and infrastructure ==
State Highway 6 passes through the town.

Westpower owns and operates the local distribution network in Franz Josef. Electricity is supplied from the national grid at Hokitika via Westpower's 146-kilometre-long (91 mi) 33 kV line from Hokitika to Fox Glacier. Manawa Energy owns the 3 MW Wahapo hydroelectric power station, 20 km (12 mi) north of the town. This station can operate islanded and supply the town if the grid supply is lost.

The Westland District Council owns and operates reticulated water and wastewater systems in the town.

== Education ==
Franz Josef Glacier School is a coeducational full primary (year 1–8) school with a roll of 42 students as of July 2026. It opened in 1921 as Waiho Gorge School. It was rebuilt and renamed after being destroyed by a fire in 1967. The nearest secondary school is South Westland Area School, 62 km (39 mi) away in Hari Hari.

The school roll has fluctuated between 12 and 57, and is largely driven by families moving to or from Franz Josef to work in tourism. In 2002 the roll was 45, dropping to 12 in 2012, increasing to 51 in 2018, and dropping to 34 in 2022 as tourism businesses closed in response to the COVID-19 pandemic. The school has twice been reduced to a single teacher when student numbers have dropped below 25.

== Climate ==
Climate data for Franz Josef (1991–2020)
Month	Jan	Feb	Mar	Apr	May	Jun	Jul	Aug	Sep	Oct	Nov	Dec	Year
Mean daily maximum °C (°F)	20.0 (68.0)	20.5 (68.9)	18.9 (66.0)	16.7 (62.1)	14.5 (58.1)	12.2 (54.0)	11.9 (53.4)	12.6 (54.7)	13.7 (56.7)	14.9 (58.8)	15.9 (60.6)	18.4 (65.1)	15.9 (60.5)
Daily mean °C (°F)	15.2 (59.4)	15.4 (59.7)	14.1 (57.4)	12.2 (54.0)	10.2 (50.4)	8.2 (46.8)	7.6 (45.7)	8.2 (46.8)	9.3 (48.7)	10.5 (50.9)	11.7 (53.1)	13.9 (57.0)	11.4 (52.5)
Mean daily minimum °C (°F)	10.5 (50.9)	10.4 (50.7)	9.3 (48.7)	7.8 (46.0)	6.0 (42.8)	4.1 (39.4)	3.3 (37.9)	3.7 (38.7)	4.9 (40.8)	6.2 (43.2)	7.5 (45.5)	9.4 (48.9)	6.9 (44.5)
Average rainfall mm (inches)	552.0 (21.73)	357.6 (14.08)	396.5 (15.61)	389.4 (15.33)	471.0 (18.54)	455.7 (17.94)	317.8 (12.51)	426.6 (16.80)	520.1 (20.48)	594.1 (23.39)	480.7 (18.93)	593.7 (23.37)	5,555.2 (218.71)
Mean monthly sunshine hours	117.9	106.8	116.3	101.9	91.6	76.0	93.8	104.1	91.1	89.4	96.4	83.3	1,168.6
Source: CliFlo
