= Mount Isabel =

Mountain in New Zealand

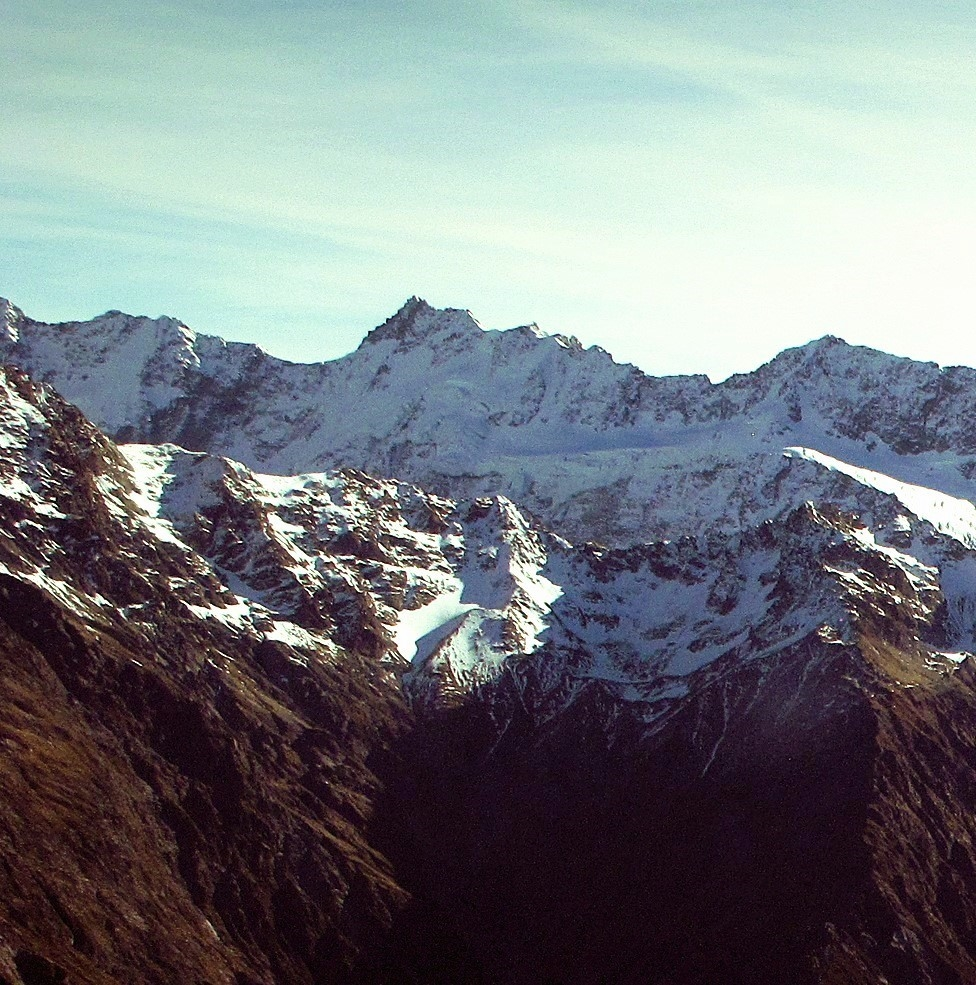
- East aspect centred on skyline

Highest point
- Elevation: 2,598 m (8,524 ft)
- Prominence: 198 m (650 ft)
- Parent peak: Mount Burns
- Isolation: 1.76 km (1.09 mi)
- Coordinates: 43°43′55″S 170°00′50″E

Naming
- Etymology: Isabella Mueller

Geography
- Location within New Zealand
- Interactive map of Mount Isabel
- Location: South Island
- Country: New Zealand
- Region: Canterbury / West Coast
- Protected area: Aoraki / Mount Cook National Park; Westland Tai Poutini National Park
- Parent range: Southern Alps
- Topo map(s): NZMS260 H36; Topo50 BY15

Climbing
- First ascent: 1914

Mount Isabel is a 2,598-metre-elevation (8,524-foot) mountain in New Zealand.

== Description ==
Mount Isabel is set on the crest or Main Divide of the Southern Alps and is situated on the boundary shared by the West Coast and Canterbury Regions of the South Island. This peak is located seven kilometres (4.3 mi) west of Mount Cook Village and set on the boundary shared by Aoraki / Mount Cook National Park and Westland Tai Poutini National Park. Precipitation runoff from the mountain's west slope drains into the headwaters of the Landsborough River, whereas the north slope drains into the Douglas River, and the southeast slope drains to the Hooker River. Topographic relief is significant as the summit rises 1,100 metres (3,609 feet) above the Mueller Glacier in 1.5 kilometre. The nearest higher neighbour is Mount Burns, 2.8 kilometres to the southwest.

== Etymology ==
The mountain's toponym honours Isabella Mueller (born 1867), daughter of New Zealand surveyor Gerhard Mueller. The summit is situated midway between Mount Bannie which is named after Isabella's mother, Elizabeth Bannatyne (Bannie) Mueller, and Mount Eric which is named after Isabella's younger brother, Eric.

== Climbing ==
Climbing routes with the first ascents:

- North East Ridge via Twain Col – Peter Graham, Samuel Turner – (March 1914)
- North West Ridge – Rob Frost, Simon Mills – (March 2008)

== Climate ==
Based on the Köppen climate classification, Mount Isabel is located in a marine west coast (Cfb) climate zone, with a subpolar oceanic climate (Cfc) at the summit. Prevailing westerly winds blow moist air from the Tasman Sea onto the mountains, where the air is forced upward by the mountains (orographic lift), causing moisture to drop in the form of rain or snow. This climate supports the McKerrow, Ngakanohi and Mueller glaciers surrounding the peak. The months of December through February offer the most favourable weather for viewing or climbing this peak.

== See also ==
- List of mountains of New Zealand by height
