= Lyttle Peak =

Mountain in New Zealand

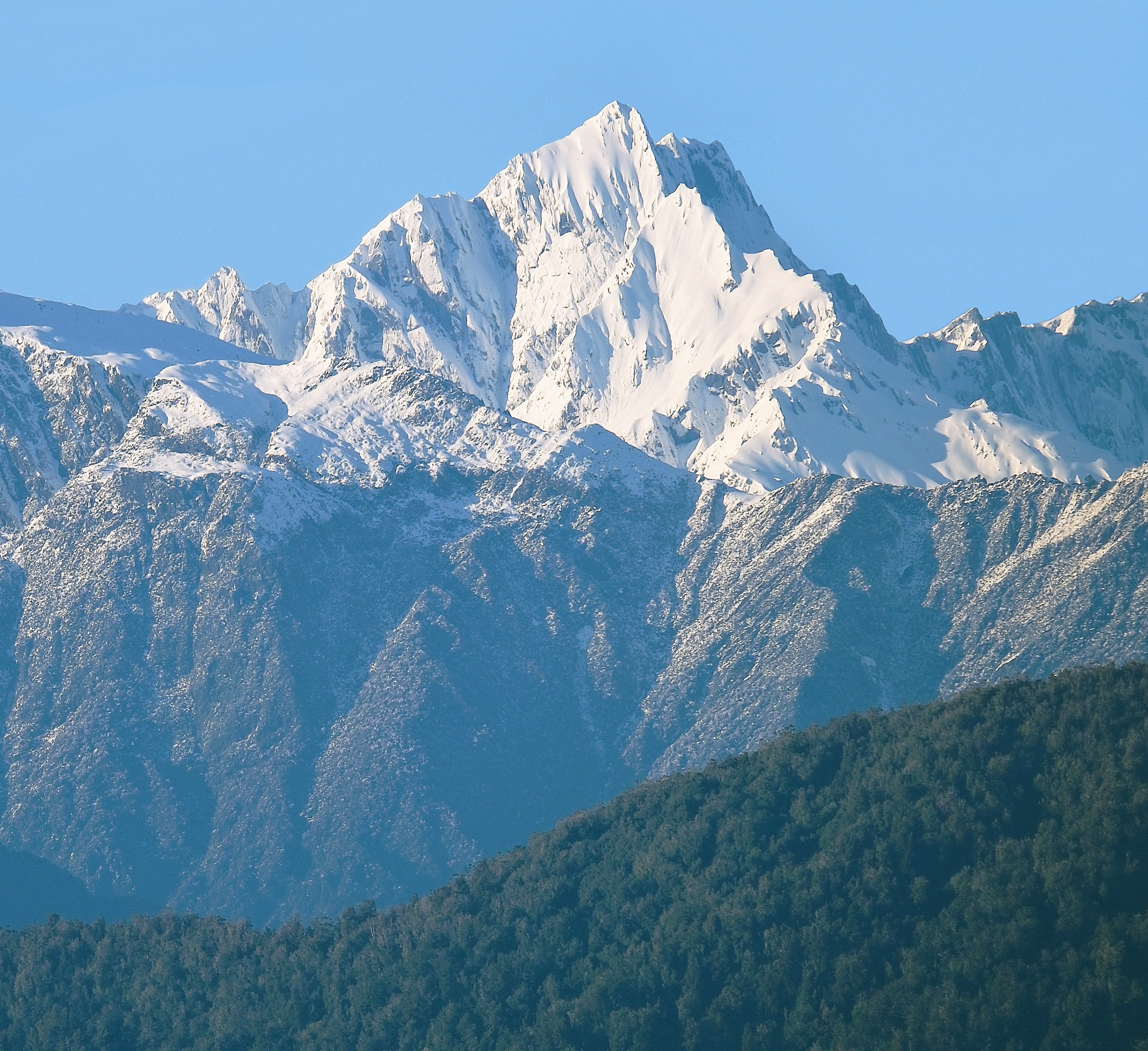
- North aspect

Highest point
- Elevation: 2,240 m (7,349 ft)
- Prominence: 391 m (1,283 ft)
- Isolation: 3.56 km (2.21 mi)
- Coordinates: 43°35′26″S 169°58′53″E

Geography
- Location within New Zealand
- Interactive map of Lyttle Peak
- Location: South Island
- Country: New Zealand
- Region: West Coast
- Protected area: Westland Tai Poutini National Park
- Parent range: Southern Alps; Navigator Range
- Topo map(s): NZMS260 H36; Topo50 BX15

Geology
- Rock type: Schist

Lyttle Peak is a mountain in the West Coast Region of New Zealand.

== Description ==
Lyttle Peak is a 2,240-metre-elevation (7,349-foot) summit located in Westland Tai Poutini National Park on the South Island, and it is situated in the Navigator Range of the Southern Alps. Precipitation runoff from the mountain drains north into the Cook River / Weheka, south into the Ruera River, and west into the headwaters of Architect Creek which is a tributary of the Copland River. Topographic relief is significant as the summit rises 1,500 metres (4,921 feet) above the Cook River Valley in two kilometres. The nearest higher neighbour is Mount Copland, 3.5 kilometres to the east, and Aoraki / Mount Cook is 13 km (8.1 mi) to the east. The mountain's toponym appeared as "Lyttle's Peak" in publications as early as 1893.

== Climbing ==
Established climbing routes with first ascents:

- Via Bannister Rock – Tom Sheerhan, George Bannister – (1931)
- The Architect – Steve Harris, Pete Harris – (2014)
- North Ridge

== Climate ==
Based on the Köppen climate classification, Lyttle Peak is located in a marine west coast (Cfb) climate zone. Prevailing westerly winds blow moist air from the Tasman Sea onto the mountains, where the air is forced upward by the mountains (orographic lift), causing moisture to fall in the form of rain or snow. This climate supports the Lyttle Glacier on the southern slope of the peak. The months of December through February offer the most favourable weather for viewing or climbing this peak.

== Gallery ==
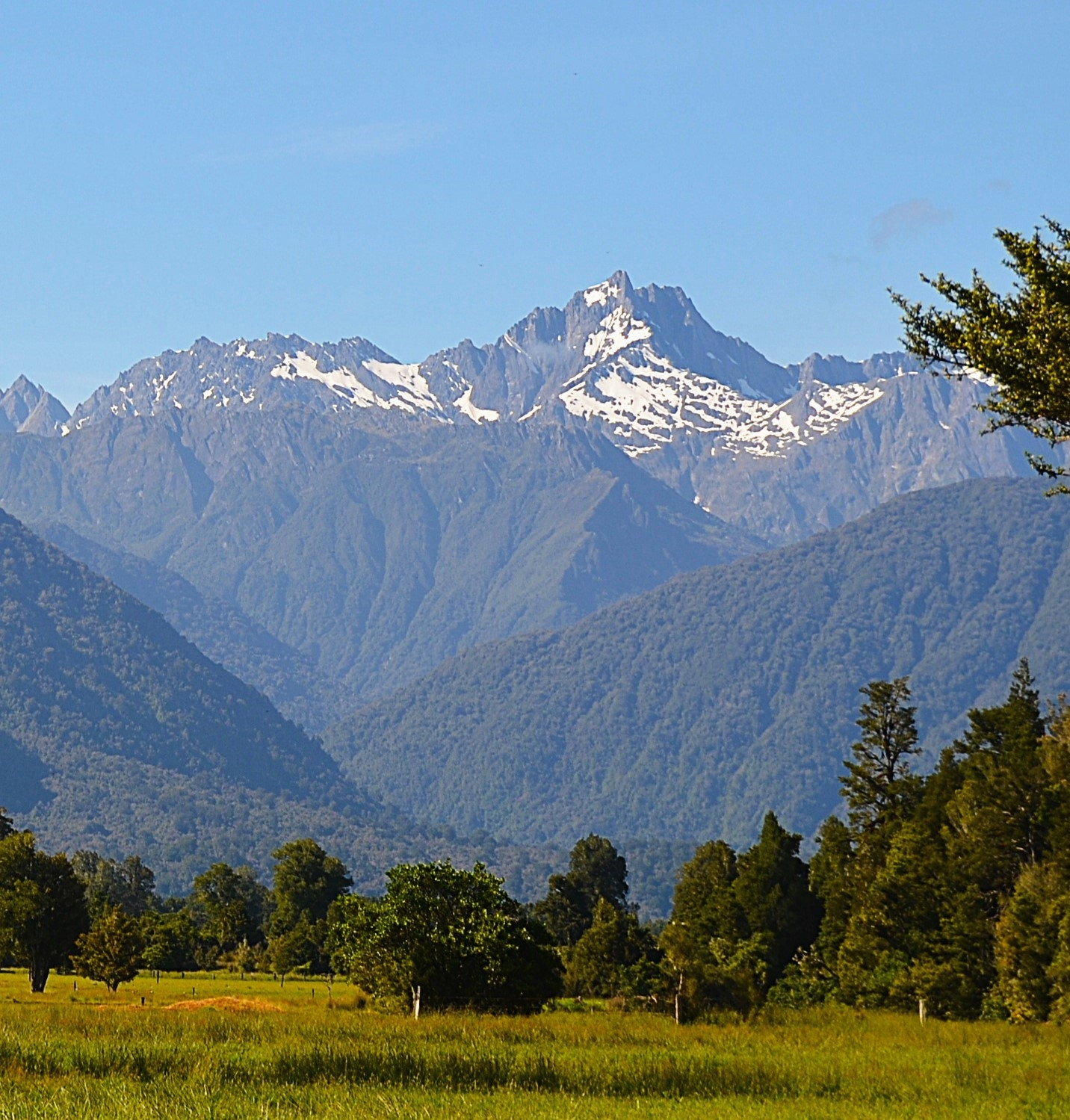
Lyttle Peak in December

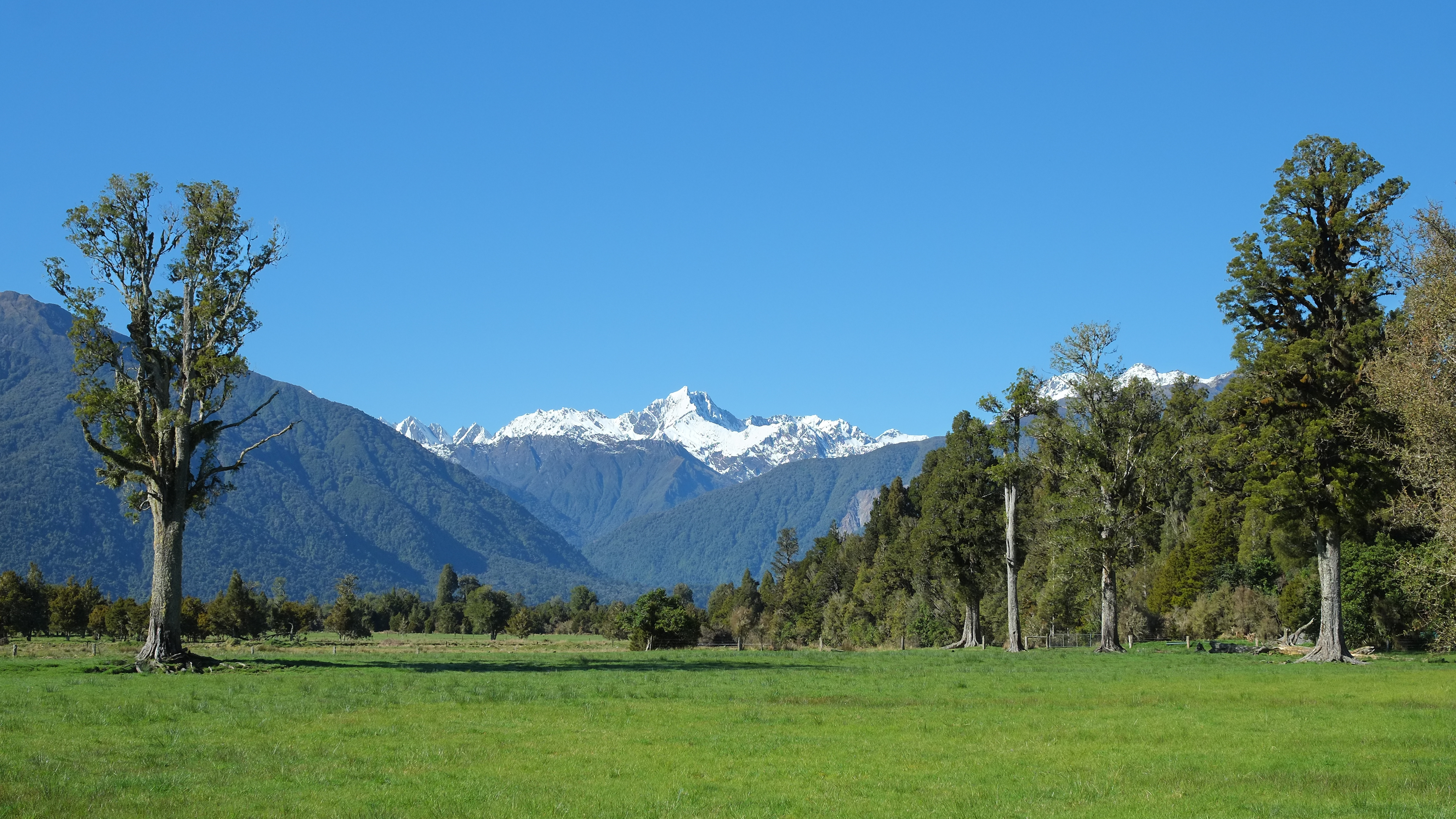
View across paddocks near Lake Matheson towards Lyttle Peak

== See also ==
- List of mountains of New Zealand by height
