= Dilemma Peak =

Mountain in New Zealand

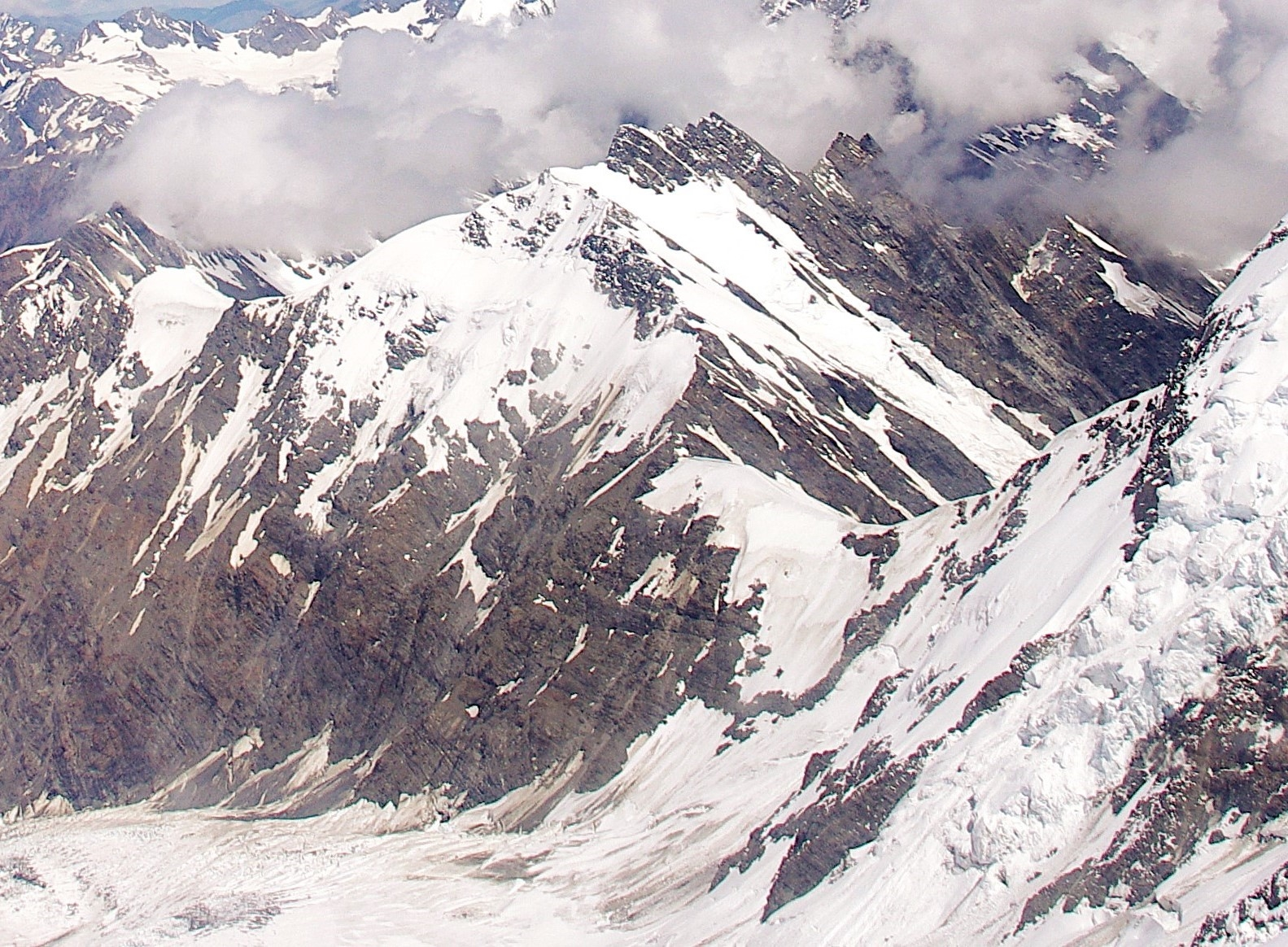
- North aspect

Highest point
- Elevation: 2,602 m (8,537 ft)
- Prominence: 410 m (1,345 ft)
- Isolation: 2.06 km (1.28 mi)
- Listing: Highest mountains of New Zealand
- Coordinates: 43°37′31″S 170°05′21″E

Naming
- Etymology: Dilemma

Geography
- Location within New Zealand
- Interactive map of Dilemma Peak
- Location: South Island
- Country: New Zealand
- Region: West Coast
- Protected area: Westland Tai Poutini National Park
- Parent range: Southern Alps; Banks Range
- Topo map(s): NZMS260 H36; Topo50 BX15

Climbing
- First ascent: March 1914

Dilemma Peak is a 2,602-metre-elevation (8,537-foot) mountain in the West Coast Region of New Zealand.

== Description ==
Dilemma Peak is situated along the crest or Main Divide of the Southern Alps and set in the West Coast Region of South Island. It is located 12 kilometres north of Mount Cook Village and set along the boundary that Westland Tai Poutini National Park shares with Aoraki / Mount Cook National Park. Precipitation runoff from the mountain drains north into the Strauchon River, south into the headwaters of Copland River, and east to the Hooker River. Topographic relief is significant as the summit rises 1,200 metres (3,937 feet) above the Strauchon Glacier in one kilometre. The nearest higher peak is La Perouse, 2.66 kilometres to the north. The first ascent of the summit was made on 27 March 1914 by Tom Fyfe and Conrad Kain. The lower 2,594-meter east peak was first climbed in January 1914 by Hugh Chambers, Peter Graham, and Dorothy Holdsworth.

== Climate ==
Based on the Köppen climate classification, Dilemma Peak is located in a marine west coast (Cfb) climate zone, with a tundra climate at the summit. Prevailing westerly winds blow moist air from the Tasman Sea onto the mountains, where the air is forced upward by the mountains (orographic lift), causing moisture to drop in the form of rain or snow. This climate supports the Copland and other small unnamed glaciers on this mountain's slopes. The months of December through February offer the most favourable weather for viewing or climbing this peak.

== Climbing ==
Climbing routes with first ascents:

- Standard Route – Tom Fyfe, Conrad Kain – (1914)
- Carter-Gough – Brian Carter, Peter Gough – (1973)
- Strauchon Face Direct – Fred From, Murray Judge, Nic Kagan – (1978)
- Misty Mountain Hop – John Goulstone, Mike Rockell – (1983)
- Compressor Route – Peter Dickson – (1991)

== See also ==
- List of mountains of New Zealand by height
