= Douglas Lake (disambiguation) =

Douglas Lake or Lake Douglas is the name of several different lakes:

== United States ==
- Douglas Lake (Alabama)
- Douglas Lake (Alaska)
- Douglas Lake (Georgia)
- Douglas Lake (Illinois)
- Douglas Lake (Kansas)
- Douglas Lake (Kentucky)
- Douglas Lake (Cheboygan County, Michigan)
- Douglas Lake (Otsego County, Michigan), Otsego County, Michigan
- Douglas Lake (Minnesota)
- Douglas Lake (Clay County, Mississippi), Clay County, Mississippi
- Douglas Lake (Lafayette County, Mississippi), Lafayette County, Mississippi
- Douglas Lake (Missouri)
- Douglas Lake (North Dakota)
- Douglas Lake (Oregon)
- Douglas Lake, Tennessee
- Douglas Lake (West Virginia)
- Douglas Lake (Wisconsin)
- Lake Douglas (Lake County, Florida), Lake County, Florida
- Lake Douglas (Orange County, Florida), Orange County, Florida
- Lake Douglas (Georgia)
- Lake Douglas (Montana)
- Lake Douglas (South Dakota)

== Canada ==
- Douglas Lake, British Columbia - see Douglas Lake Airport
- Douglas Lake, Northwest Territories

== New Zealand ==
- Douglas Lake (New Zealand), glacial lake at the terminus of the Douglas Glacier
