= Fettes Peak =

Mountain in New Zealand

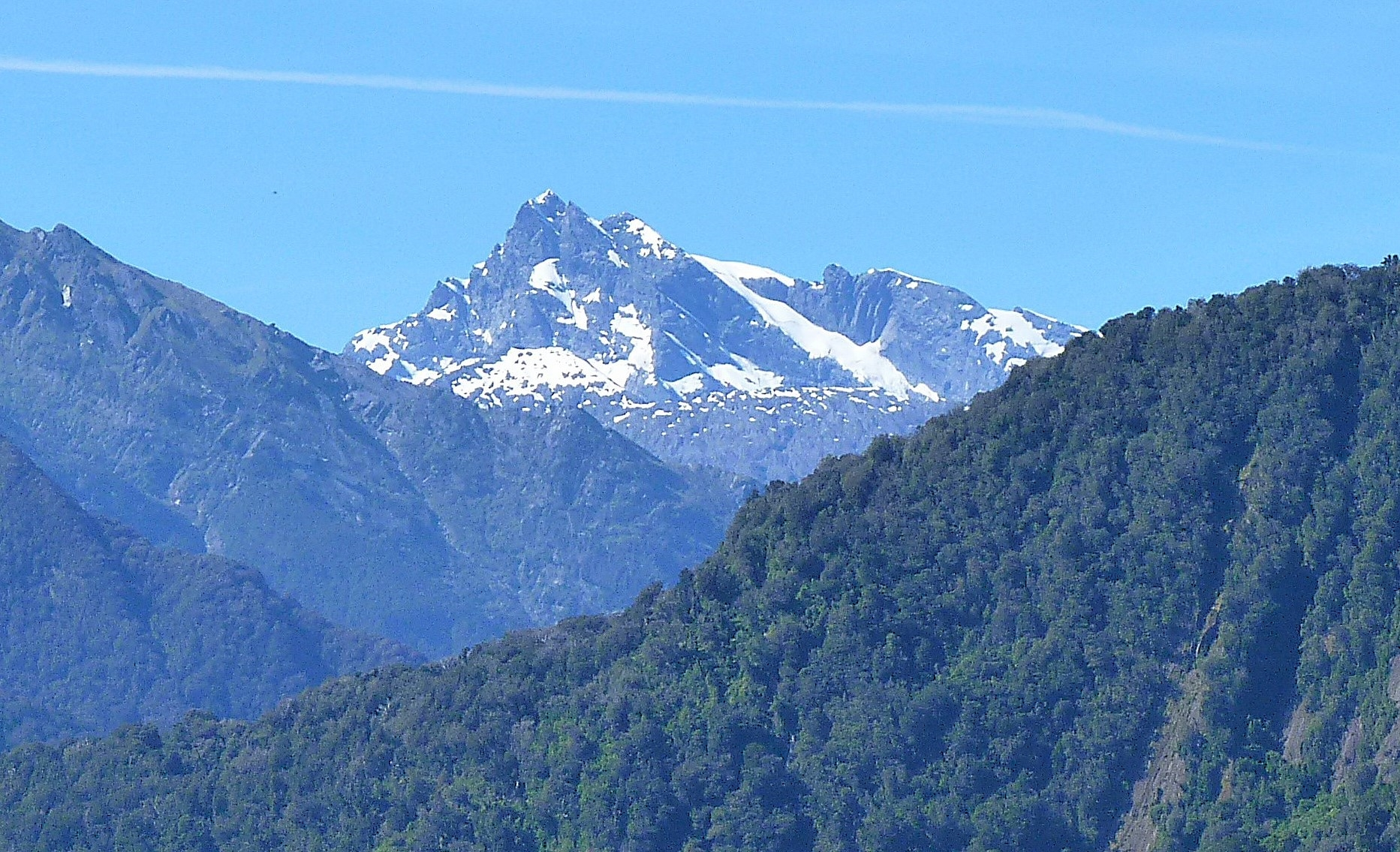
- North aspect

Highest point
- Elevation: 2,451 m (8,041 ft)
- Prominence: 921 m (3,022 ft)
- Isolation: 6.53 km (4.06 mi)
- Listing: New Zealand #85
- Coordinates: 43°45′03″S 169°52′11″E

Geography
- Location within New Zealand
- Interactive map of Fettes Peak
- Location: South Island
- Country: New Zealand
- Region: West Coast
- Protected area: Westland Tai Poutini National Park
- Parent range: Southern Alps; Hooker Range
- Topo map(s): NZMS260 H36; Topo50 BY15

Climbing
- First ascent: January 1935

Fettes Peak is a 2,451-metre-elevation (8,041-foot) mountain in the West Coast Region of New Zealand.

== Description ==
Fettes Peak is located on the southernmost boundary of Westland Tai Poutini National Park in the Southern Alps of the South Island. The mountain is situated at the triple junction point where the Bare Rocky, Hooker, and Bannock Brae subranges converge. Precipitation runoff from the mountain drains south into the Landsborough River, northeast into the Troyte River, and northwest into the headwaters of the Jacobs River. Topographic relief is significant as the summit rises 1,650 metres (5,413 feet) above the Landsborough Valley in three kilometres, and the northeast face rises 1,250 metres (4,101 feet) in one kilometre. The nearest higher peak is Mount Strachan, six kilometres to the southwest. The mountain's toponym was applied in 1885 by Charlie Douglas, New Zealand surveyor and explorer. He was descended on his mother's side from William Fettes, the founder of Fettes College in Edinburgh, Scotland.

== Climbing ==
The first ascent of the summit was made in January 1935 by Archie Scott, Christopher Johnson, and Scott Russell.

Climbing routes with the first ascents:

- South Ridge – Archie Scott, Christopher Johnson, Scott Russell – (1935)
- West Face – Marie Byles, Marjorie Edgar-Jones, Harry Ayres, Frank Alack – (1935)
- North East Ridge – Stu Allan, Olly McCahon – (1971)
- North West Flank – Aat Vervoorn, Dave Chowdhury – (2001)
- Troyte Face – Ruari Macfarlane, Allan Brent – (2022)

== Climate ==
Based on the Köppen climate classification, Fettes Peak is located in a marine west coast (Cfb) climate zone, with a subpolar oceanic climate (Cfc) at the summit. Prevailing westerly winds blow moist air from the Tasman Sea onto the mountains, where the air is forced upward by the mountains (orographic lift), causing moisture to fall in the form of rain or snow. This climate supports the Zircon and Fettes glaciers on the southern slope of the peak. The months of December through February offer the most favourable weather for viewing or climbing this peak.

== See also ==
- List of mountains of New Zealand by height
