= Copland Track =

New Zealand tramping track

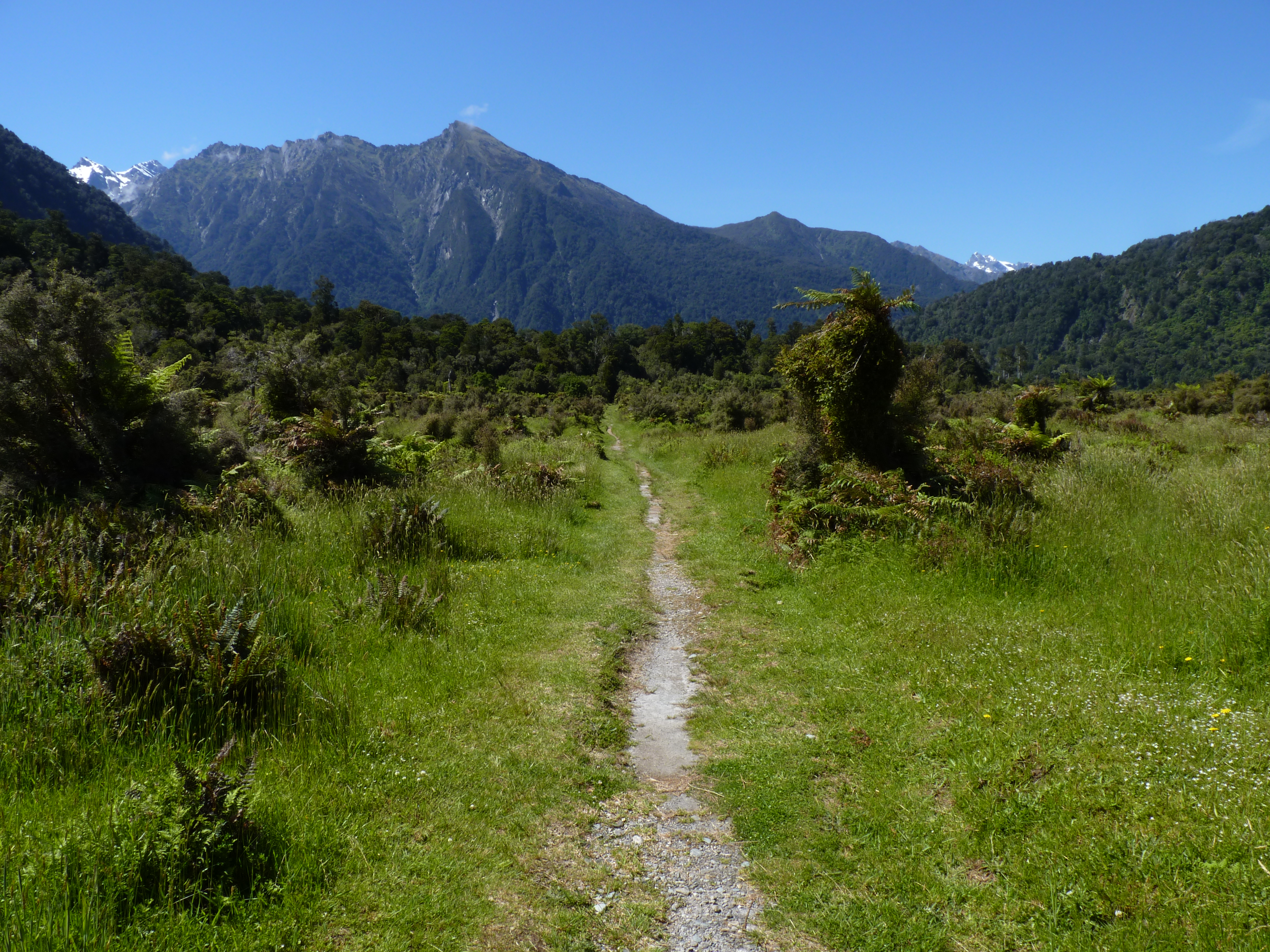
- Near the start of the Copland Track
- Length: 18 km (11.18 mi) to Welcome Flat, further 7 km (4.35 mi) to Douglas Rock Hut
- Location: Westland Tai Poutini National Park, West Coast, New Zealand
- Trailheads: State Highway 6, 26 km (16.16 mi) south of Fox Glacier
- Use: Hiking
- Elevation change: 715 m (2,346 ft)
- Highest point: Douglas Rock Hut, 755 m (2,477 ft)
- Lowest point: State Highway 6, 40 m (130 ft)
- Difficulty: Intermediate (to Welcome Flat), Advanced (to Douglas Rock Hut)
- Season: Summer to Autumn
- Sights: Welcome Flat hot pools
- Hazards: Flooding, rockfalls, avalanches, landslides
- Maintained by: Department of Conservation

The Copland Track is a tramping track in the south Westland area of New Zealand's South Island, well known for the naturally occurring hot springs at Welcome Flat along its route. The main track is approximately 25 kilometres (16 mi) long one-way from the trailhead at State Highway 6 to the track's inland end at the Douglas Rock Hut, and is usually completed in 2 to 4 days depending on whether the full distance is walked, with many opting to walk only as far as Welcome Flat. The track is the western portion of a longer path which historically connected the West Coast to Mount Cook Village via Copland Pass, however erosion and the retreat of the Hooker Glacier has led to the eastern side of this route becoming increasingly dangerous to traverse.

== History ==
The Copland Valley which forms the main route of the track has long been used by local Māori, who were aware of the pass at the head of the valley and would frequently visit the area to hunt weka and bathe in the hot pools. European exploration of the valley began in the late 19th century and was largely spurred on by development of the Hermitage Hotel, Mount Cook Village. Explorers Charlie Douglas and Arthur Harper were commissioned by the Department of Lands and Survey to determine whether the valley would be a suitable location to develop a mule track between the village and the West Coast. Despite reports from Douglas and Harper both suggesting the conditions at Copland Pass and the Hooker Glacier made a trans-alpine crossing unsuitable, interest in the route persisted. Newspaper reports suggest that the route was "within 8 miles of the Hermitage" by July 1901, with the track open to tourists soon after. The discovery of natural hot springs along the route and photographic expeditions along the route added to government interest in the track, which was seen as a core aspect of opening the West Coast to tourism.

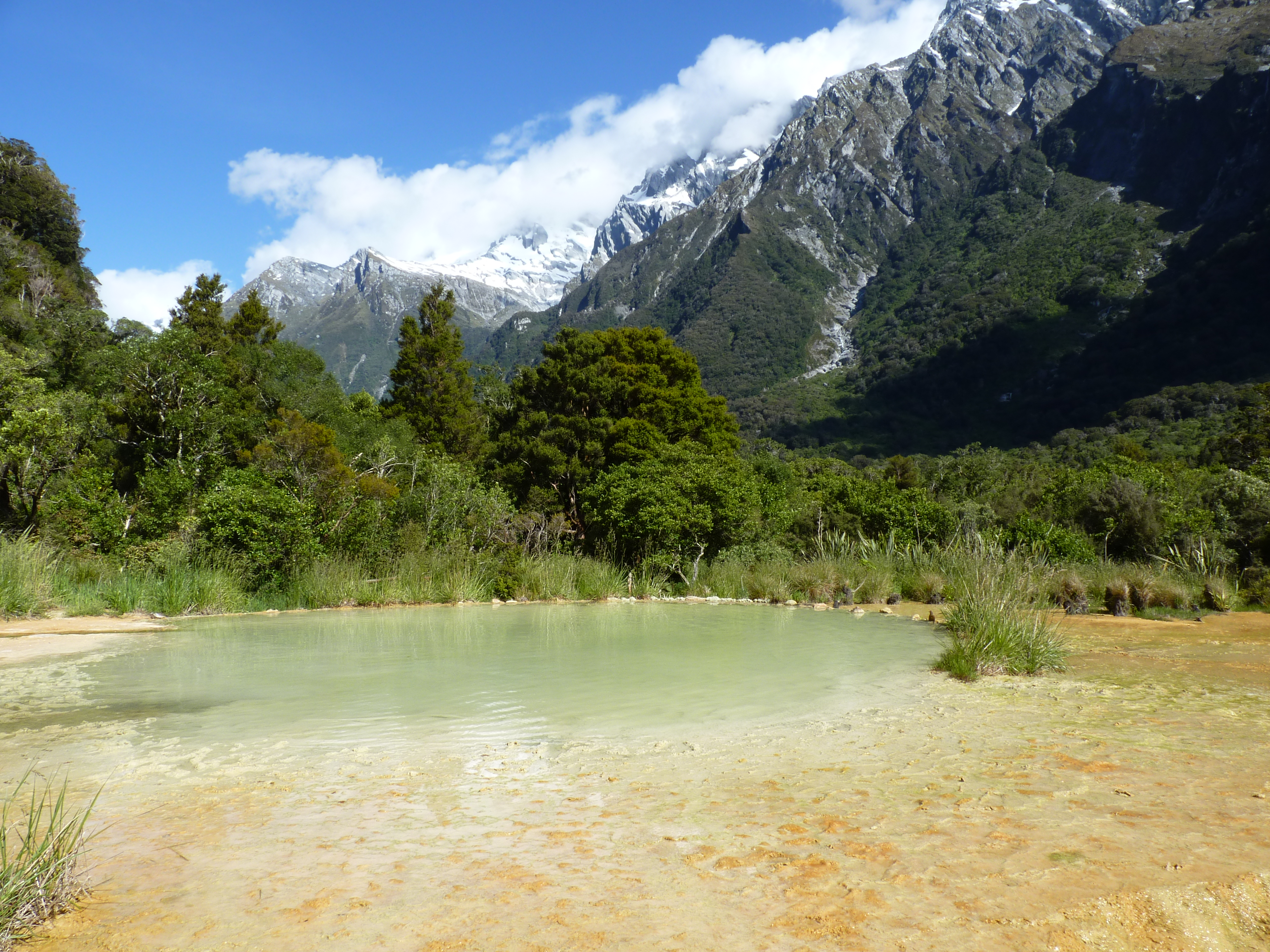
The hot pools at Welcome Flat

Improvements to the track from the initial path continued to be made, first by the Department of Roads and later by the Public Works Department. By 1910, Welcome Flat could to be reached on horseback from the west, and by 1913 a hut was built at the Flat to accommodate overnight visitors. Landslips in the late 1910s delayed the construction of further infrastructure on the track, and it was not until 1931 that the Douglas Rock Hut in the upper reaches of the valley was completed.

Despite improvements to the track being made throughout the 1930s, World War Two and further adverse weather conditions caused it to fall into disrepair, with only infrequent use – largely by deer cullers employed by the Department of Internal Affairs. Following the establishment of Westland Tai Poutini National Park in 1960, maintenance and improvement to the track's infrastructure began on a piecemeal basis – the bridge at Architect Creek was replaced in 1966, followed by upgrades to the swing bridge at Welcome Flat in the 1970s – but it was not until the late 1970s that there was a sustained effort to improve the track's quality. Annual work on the track restored the original width and grade of the path, which in places had degraded to little more than a water course.

In 1986 a new hut was constructed at Welcome Flat on the site of a former airstrip. The hut was soon moved from this site to a safer location, following a mudslide which hit the hut just 13 weeks after it opened. The hut and facilities have continued to be renovated to cope with increasing interest in the track, with a booking system in place year-round to manage demand.

== Route ==
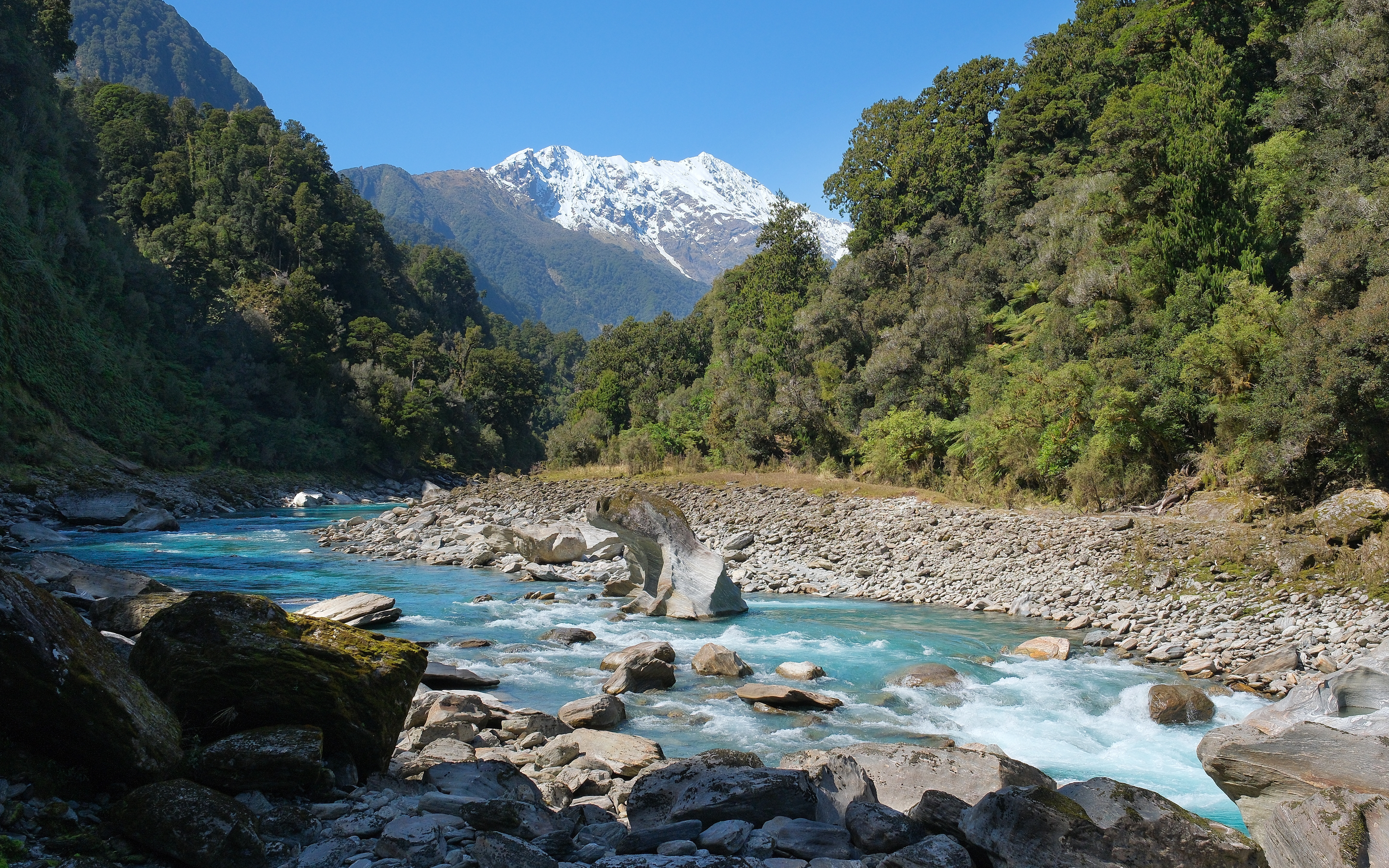
Looking up the Copland River from the Copland Track

Following the damage caused to the portion of the original track on the eastern side of the main divide by erosion and the retreat of the Hooker Glacier, the only entry point to the Copland Track is via the western trailhead at State Highway 6. Starting from this end, the traveller soon reaches a river crossing over Rough Creek which can be bypassed via a bridge roughly 1.3 kilometres (0.81 mi) upstream, adding 1.5 hours to the journey. From this, the track continues for around 5 kilometres (3.1 mi) in a south-east direction along the eastern bank of the Karangarua River, before turning east to instead follow the Copland River. As the track heads east, the terrain alternates between the riverbed of the Copland and tracks in the adjacent forest until it reaches the small Architect Creek Hut, roughly halfway between the trailhead and Welcome Flat.

From Architect Creek, the track climbs along a narrow valley, reaching a high point of around 460 metres (1,510 ft) shortly after the Shiels Creek bridge – the highest point on the lower Copland Track. After this, the track continues in a gentle descent to Welcome Flat. In addition to the hut, Welcome Flat has a natural rock bivouac which is frequently used for shelter and a system of hot springs which trampers frequently bathe in after walking the lower track.

The upper Copland Track, which extends from Welcome Flat to the Douglas Rock Hut, is less well maintained and a tougher track. After crossing the Copland River at Welcome Flat and continuing on the south side of the river for the remainder of its length, the track passes through a series of grassy flats for roughly 3 kilometres (1.9 mi) before a river crossing at Scott Creek. The track then progressively climbs again through forest with occasional crossings of scree slopes, before reaching a swing bridge at Tekano Creek and the Douglas Rock Hut beyond.

A difficult marked route to Copland Pass continues from Douglas Rock Hut, following the Copland River for a further 3.5 kilometres (2.2 mi) before a steep climb up the Aroarokaehe Range to the pass.

Point	Coordinates (links to map & photo sources)	Notes
Copland Track carpark	43.57493°S 169.81188°E	40m. Start/end of track.
Rough Creek bridge	43.57232°S 169.8276°E	95m. Side trip.
Architect Creek Hut	43.6122°S 168.214794°E	115m.
Welcome Flat Hut	43.63041°S 169.94635°E	430m.
Douglas Rock Hut	43.65307°S 170.01871°E	750m. End point of maintained track.
Copland Pass	43.65451°S 170.0906°E	2150m. Former crossing point for track.

== Huts ==
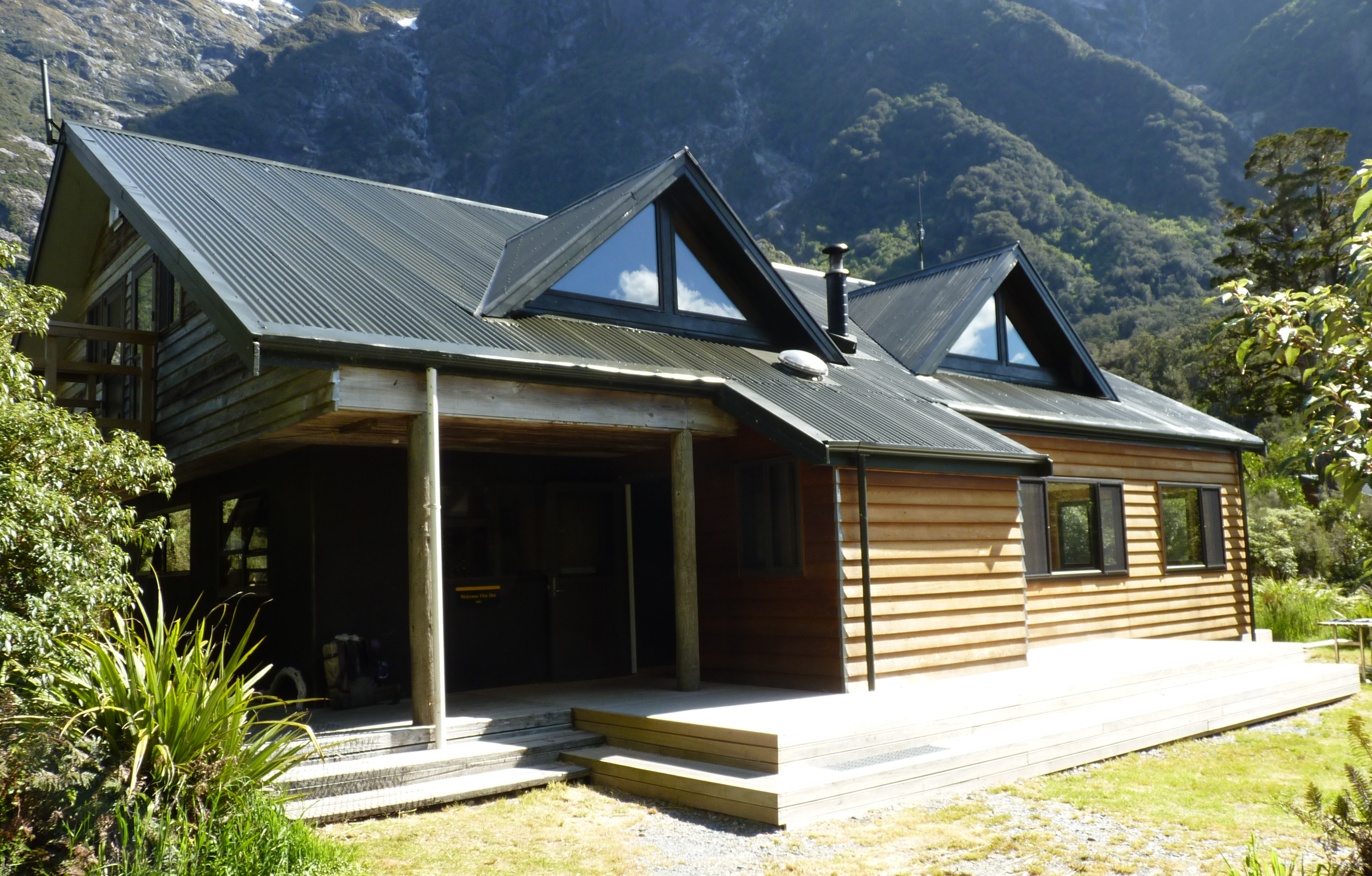
Welcome Flat Hut

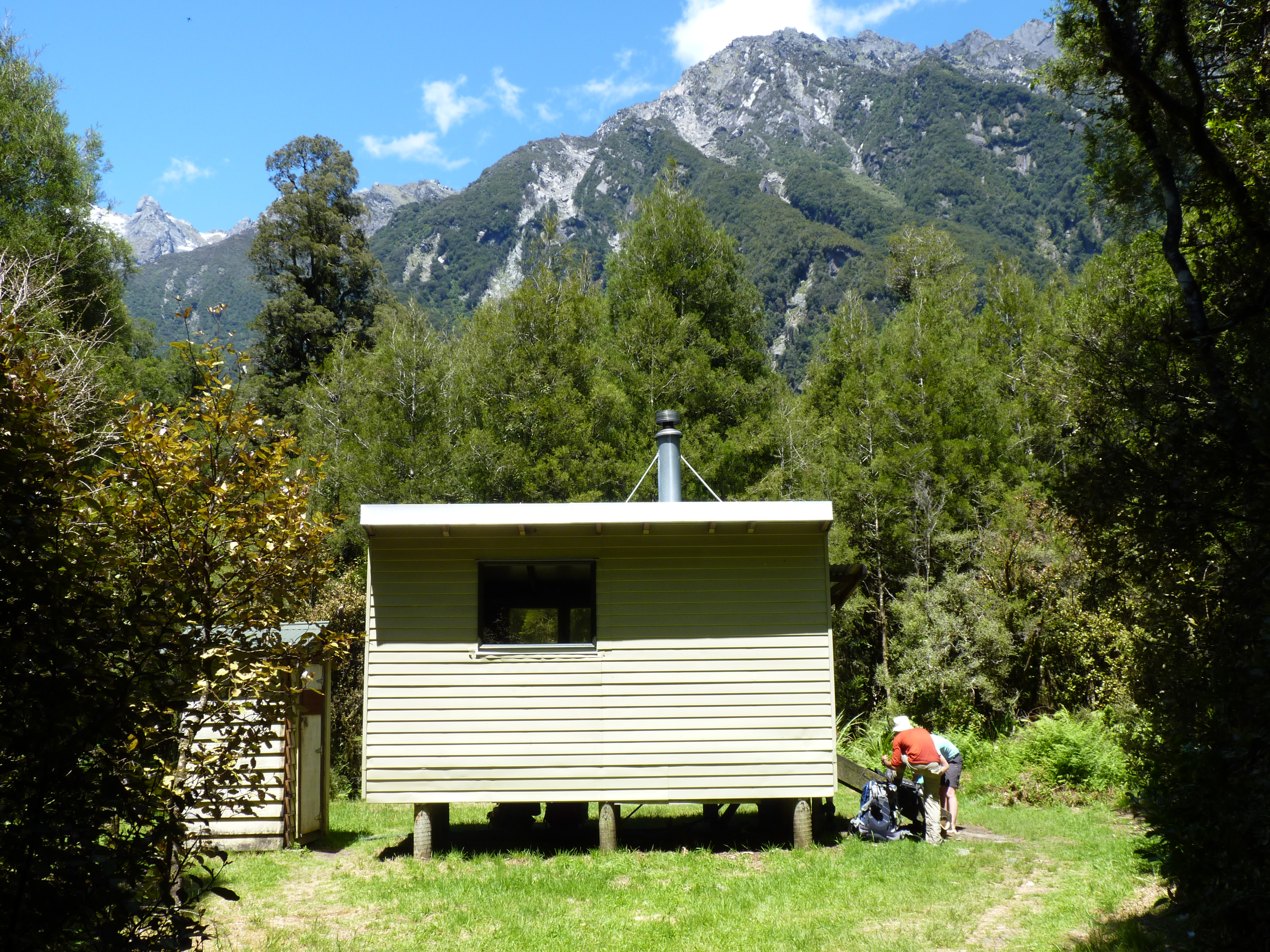
Architect Creek Hut

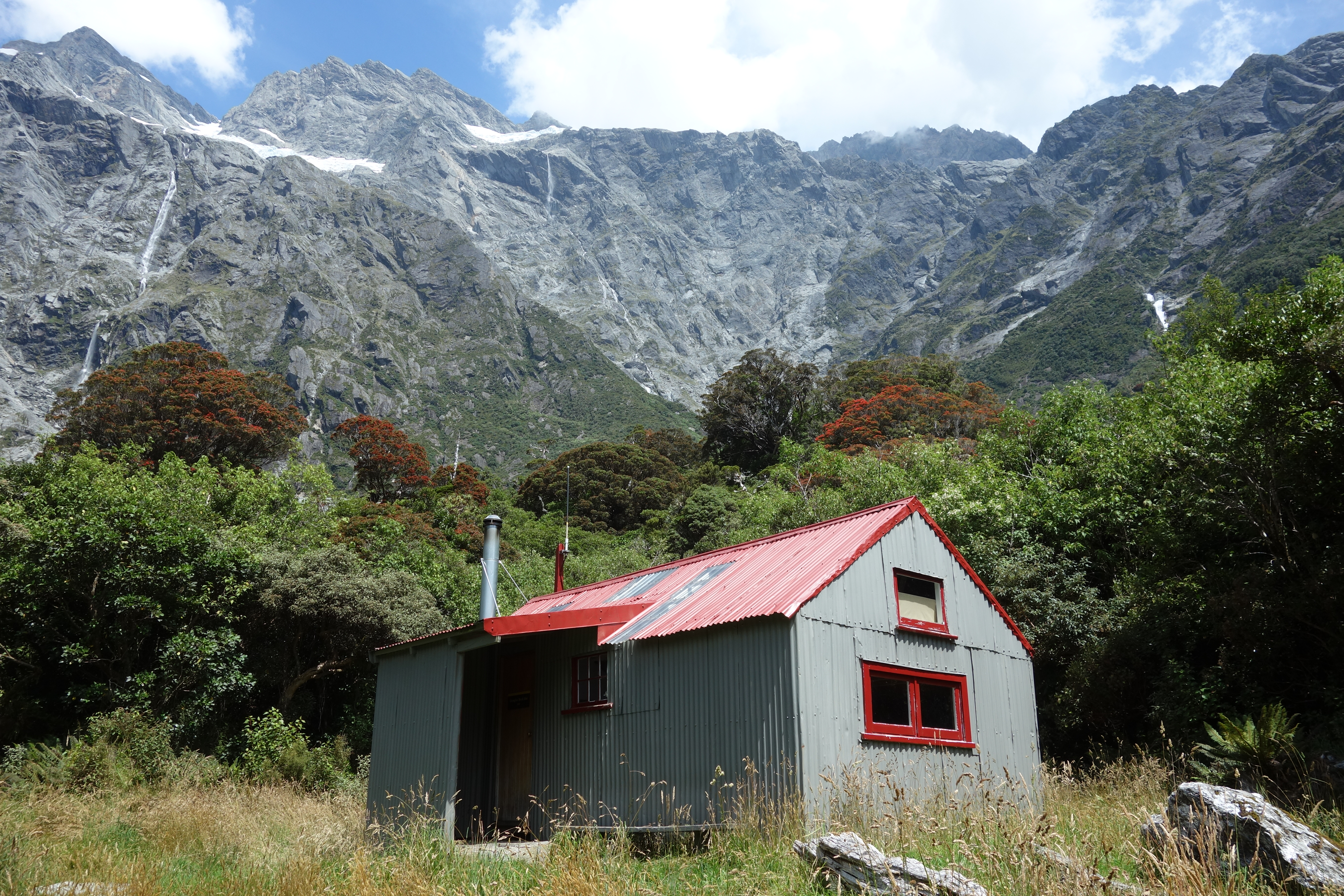
Douglas Rock Hut

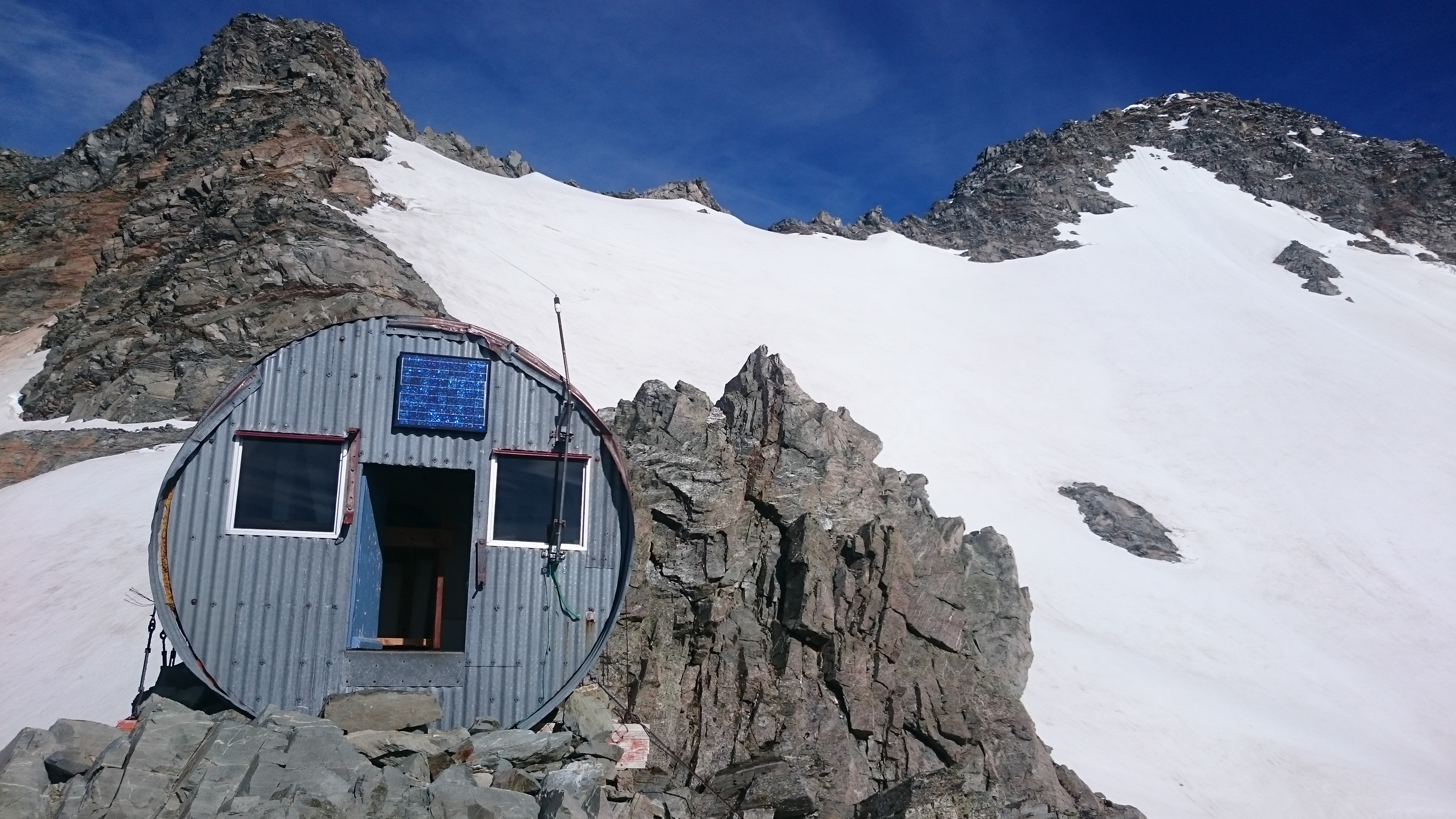
Copland Shelter, on the eastern side of Copland Pass

There are three huts along the Copland Track, with a fourth day shelter just beyond the track on the eastern side of Copland Pass. Architect Creek hut is the first and smallest of these, roughly three hours into the walk. Built in 1975, it sleeps two and can often be damp. Welcome Flat Hut is the primary hut on the track, and is located near the hot pools of the same name. The hut was placed on this site in 1987 after being hit by a mudslide at its original location, just thirteen weeks after opening. Of all the huts on the track it has the best facilities, with a capacity of 31, solar panels, and a private room available. The Douglas Rock Hut is the final overnight hut on the track, situated in the upper Copland Valley near Tekano Stream. It has a capacity of eight people and is set in the upper reaches of the valley's forest cover.
