= Lyttle =

Lyttle is a surname predominantly found in Northern Ireland and Northern America. Notable people with the surname include:

- Bradford Lyttle, prominent pacifist and peace activist, organizer with the Committee for Non-Violent Action
- Chris Lyttle (born 1981), politician in Northern Ireland
- David Lyttle (born 1984), musician, producer, songwriter, composer and record label owner from Northern Ireland
- Des Lyttle (born 1971), English former footballer turned football manager
- Foggy Lyttle, (born 1944), guitarist, best known for his work with Van Morrison
- Hulda Margaret Lyttle (1889–1983), American nurse educator and hospital administrator
- Jim Lyttle (born 1946), former major league baseball player from Hamilton, Ohio
- Joan Sylvia Lyttle Birman (born 1927), American mathematician, specializing in braid theory and knot theory
- Kevin Lyttle (born 1976), soca artist from Saint Vincent and the Grenadines
- Paul Lyttle (age 38), Canadian-American curler
- Sancho Lyttle (born 1983), professional basketball player born in Saint Vincent and the Grenadines
- Tanya Katherine Rosales Lyttle (born 1981), Filipina telenovela and film actress
- Tommy Lyttle (1939–1995), high-ranking Northern Irish loyalist during the Troubles
- Wesley Guard Lyttle (1844–1896), Irish newspaper publisher, writer and editor
- William Lyttle (1931–2010), hobby tunneller dubbed "The Mole Man of Hackney"

== See also ==
- Lyttle Lytton Contest, diminutive derivative of the Bulwer-Lytton Fiction Contest, and was first run in the year 2001
- Lyttle Peak, a mountain in New Zealand
- Mount Lyttle, a mountain in New Zealand
