= Twain =

Twain may refer to:

- The number 2 (dated or literary usage)

== People ==
- Mark Twain, pen name of American writer Samuel Langhorne Clemens (1835–1910)
- Norman Twain (1930–2016), American film producer
- Shania Twain (born 1965), Canadian singer-songwriter

== Places ==
- Twain, California, a census-designated place in Plumas County
- Douglas River, formerly named Twain, in New Zealand

== Other uses ==
- TWAIN, a communication standard for computer software and digital imaging devices
