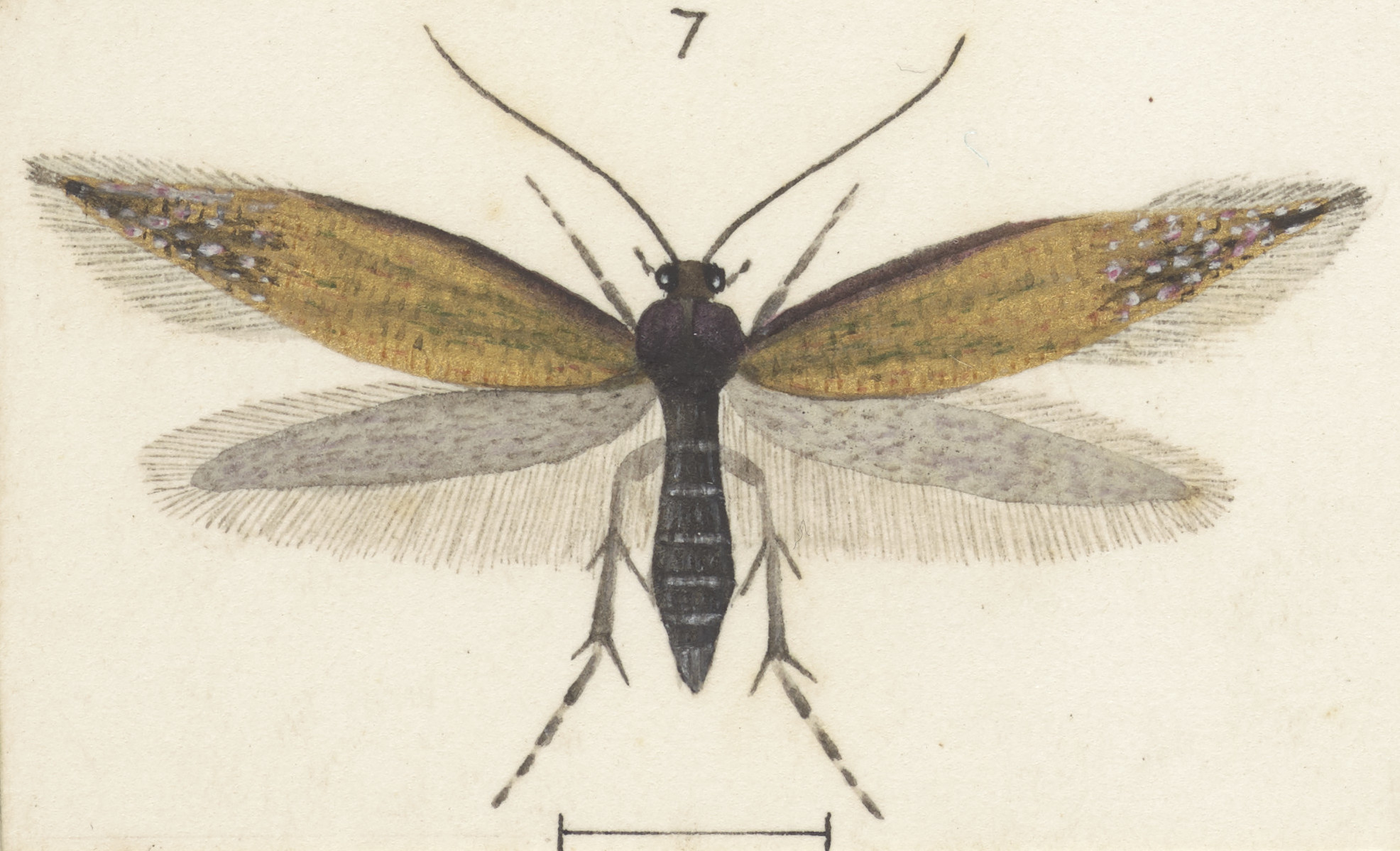
- Illustration of female

Scientific classification
- Kingdom: Animalia
- Phylum: Arthropoda
- Clade: Pancrustacea
- Class: Insecta
- Order: Lepidoptera
- Family: Glyphipterigidae
- Genus: Glyphipterix
- Species: G. aenea

Binomial name
- Glyphipterix aenea Philpott, 1917

Synonyms
- Glyphipteryx aenea Philpott, 1917

= Glyphipterix aenea =

Species of moth

Glyphipterix aenea is a species of sedge moth in the genus Glyphipterix. It was described by Alfred Philpott in 1917. It is endemic to New Zealand and has been observed in the south of the South Island. This species inhabits open grassy areas on hill and mountain sides at altitudes of between 3000 and 3500 ft. Adults are on the wing from December to February. This species is regarded as being rare.

== Taxonomy ==
This species was first described by Alfred Philpott in 1917 using specimens collected at the Hump Ridge in Fiordland and Mount Burns in the Hunter Mountains and named Glyphipteryx aenea. In 1928 George Hudson discussed and illustrated this species under that name in his book The butterflies and moths of New Zealand. In 1988 John S. Dugdale confirmed the placement of this species in the genus Glyphipterix. The male holotype specimen, collected at the Hump Ridge, is held at the New Zealand Arthropod Collection.

== Description ==
Philpott described this species as follows:

♂. 11 mm. Head dark shining brown, with prismatic reflections. Palpi loosely scaled, fuscous-brown, mixed with shining grey-whitish internally except at apex. Antennae dark fuscous. Thorax dark brass-coloured. Abdomen dark fuscous, anal tuft grey. Forewings lanceolate ; shining brass-coloured ; a snow-white stripe on costa from before middle to apex, attenuated anteriorly : cilia white on costa, grey on termen. Hindwings and cilia fuscous-grey.

== Distribution ==
This species is endemic to New Zealand. This species is said to be confined to the south of the South Island. Hudson regarded this species as rare.

== Habitat ==
G. aenea inhabits open grassy areas on mountain sides at altitudes of between 3000 and 3500 ft.

== Behaviour ==
Adults of this species have been observed on the wing from December to February.
