= La Perouse (New Zealand) =

Mountain in South Island, New Zealand

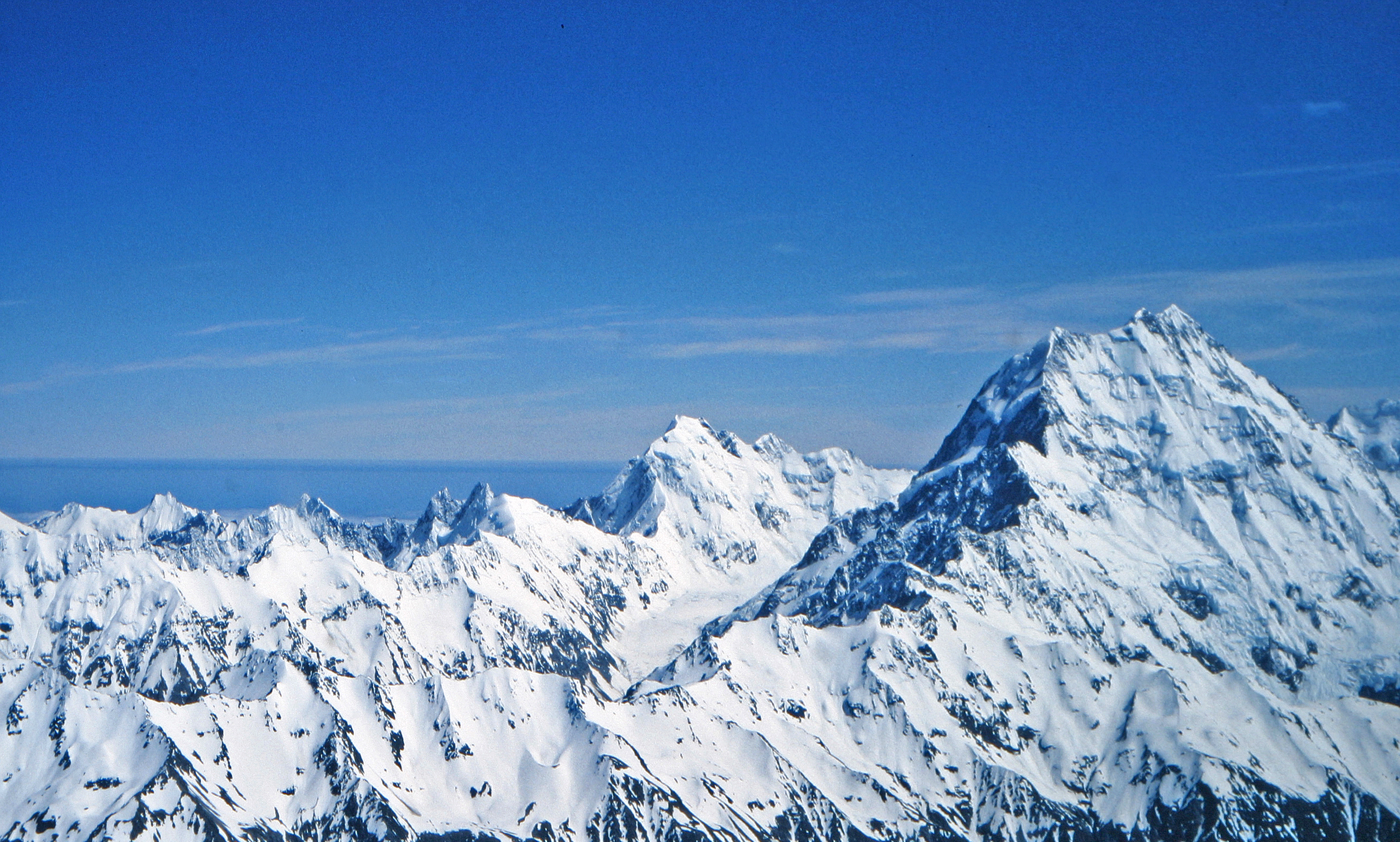
- La Perouse (middle) and Aoraki (right)

Highest point
- Elevation: 3,078 m (10,098 ft)
- Prominence: 496 m (1,627 ft)
- Coordinates: 43°36′12″S 170°5′53″E

Geography
- Location within New Zealand
- Location: South Island, New Zealand
- Parent range: Southern Alps

Climbing
- Easiest route: glacier/snow/ice climb

La Perouse, originally called Mount Stokes, is a mountain in New Zealand's Southern Alps, rising to a height of 3,078 metres (10,098 ft).

== Geography ==
La Perouse is located in the Southern Alps of the South Island, four kilometres to the southwest Aoraki / Mount Cook. Unlike Aoraki / Mount Cook, La Perouse sits on the South Island's Main Divide, on the border between Aoraki / Mount Cook National Park and Westland Tai Poutini National Park. On the northern side, the La Perouse Glacier feeds the Cook River that flows into the Tasman Sea.

== Eponymy ==
It was originally named Mount Stokes after John Lort Stokes, who was assistant surveyor during the second voyage of HMS Beagle (1831–1836) and captain of the survey ship HMS Acheron (1848–1851). Because of the prior naming of Mount Stokes in Nelson, the mountain was renamed La Perouse in honour of the French explorer Jean-François de Galaup, comte de Lapérouse (also spelt comte de La Pérouse) whose expedition foundered on Vanikoro in the Santa Cruz Islands of the Solomon Islands in 1788.

== 1948 rescue ==
La Perouse was the scene of the most arduous rescue in New Zealand's climbing history in 1948, where Ruth Adams was injured and had to be carried on a stretcher over the summit and through deep gorges to the West Coast road. She was a member in a climbing party including Harry Ayres, Edmund Hillary and Mick Sullivan. The rescue was the first time that Hillary and fellow climber Norman Hardie met; they started a lifelong friendship, with Hardie having been on the board of Edmund Hillary's Himalayan Trust for 22 years.

== Gallery ==
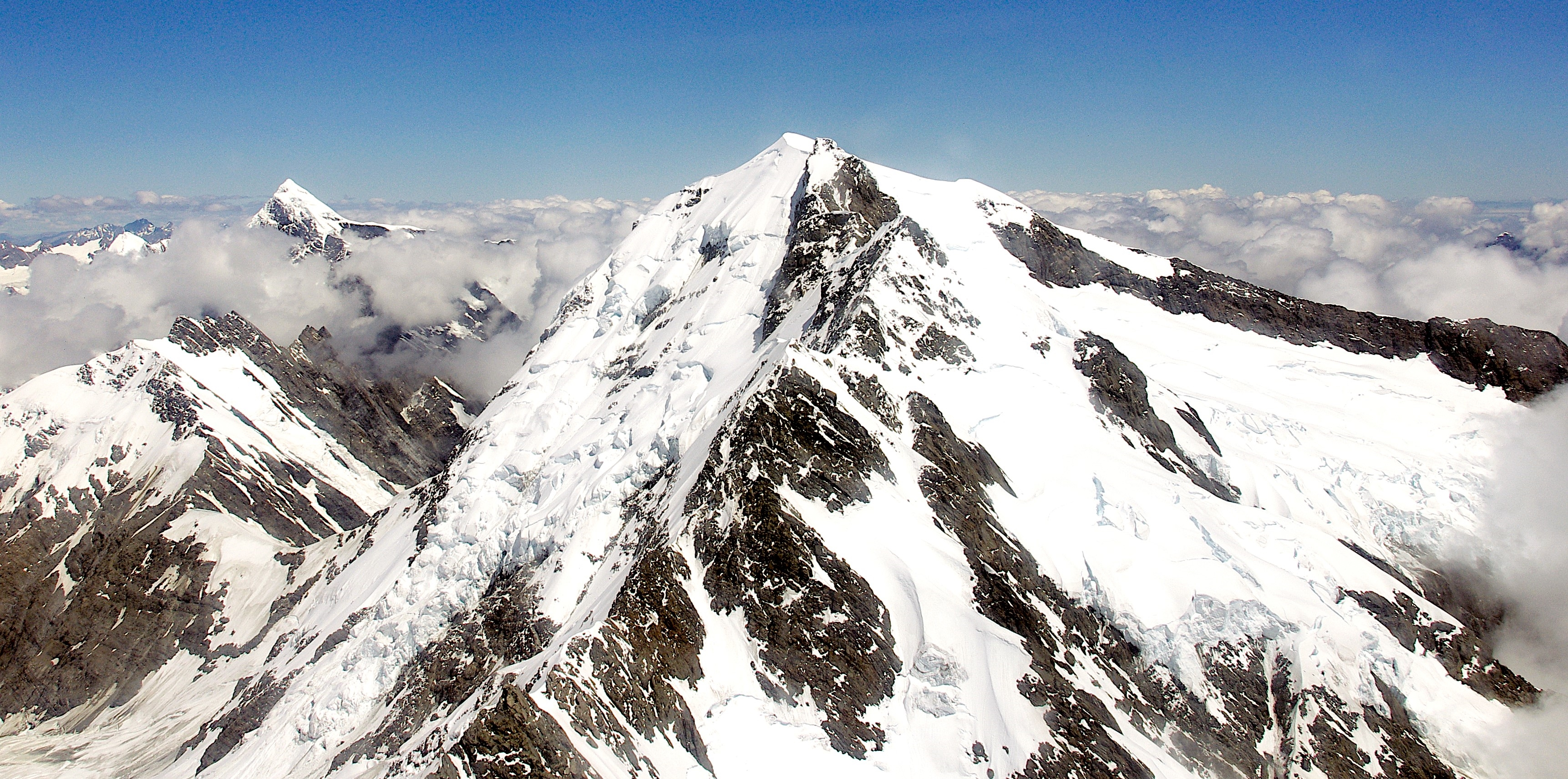
Aerial view of northeast aspect of La Perouse
(Dilemma and Sefton to left)

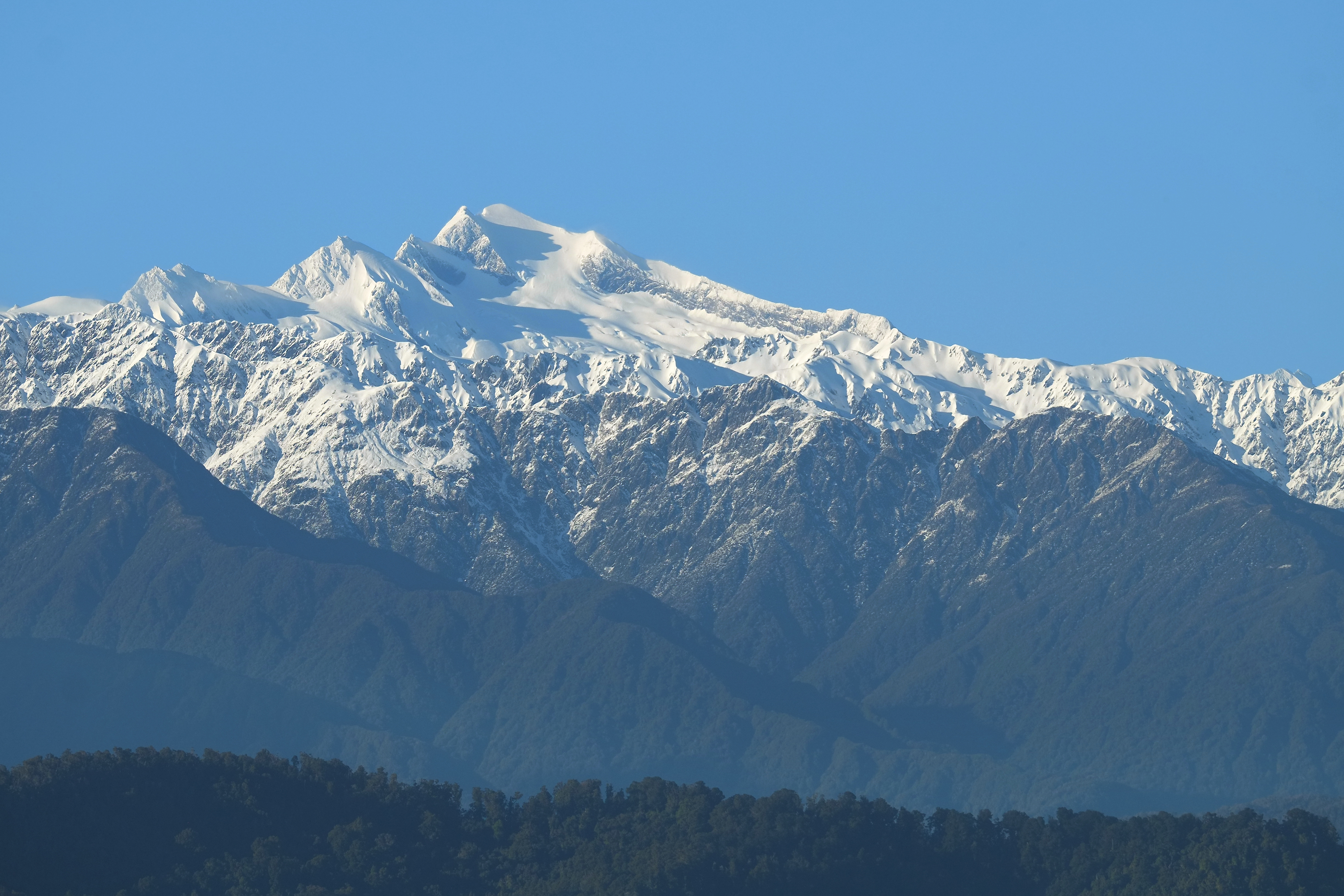
La Perouse viewed from the West Coast

== See also ==
- List of mountains of New Zealand by height
