= Copland Pass =

New Zealand alpine pass

- Nōti Hinetamatea (Māori)
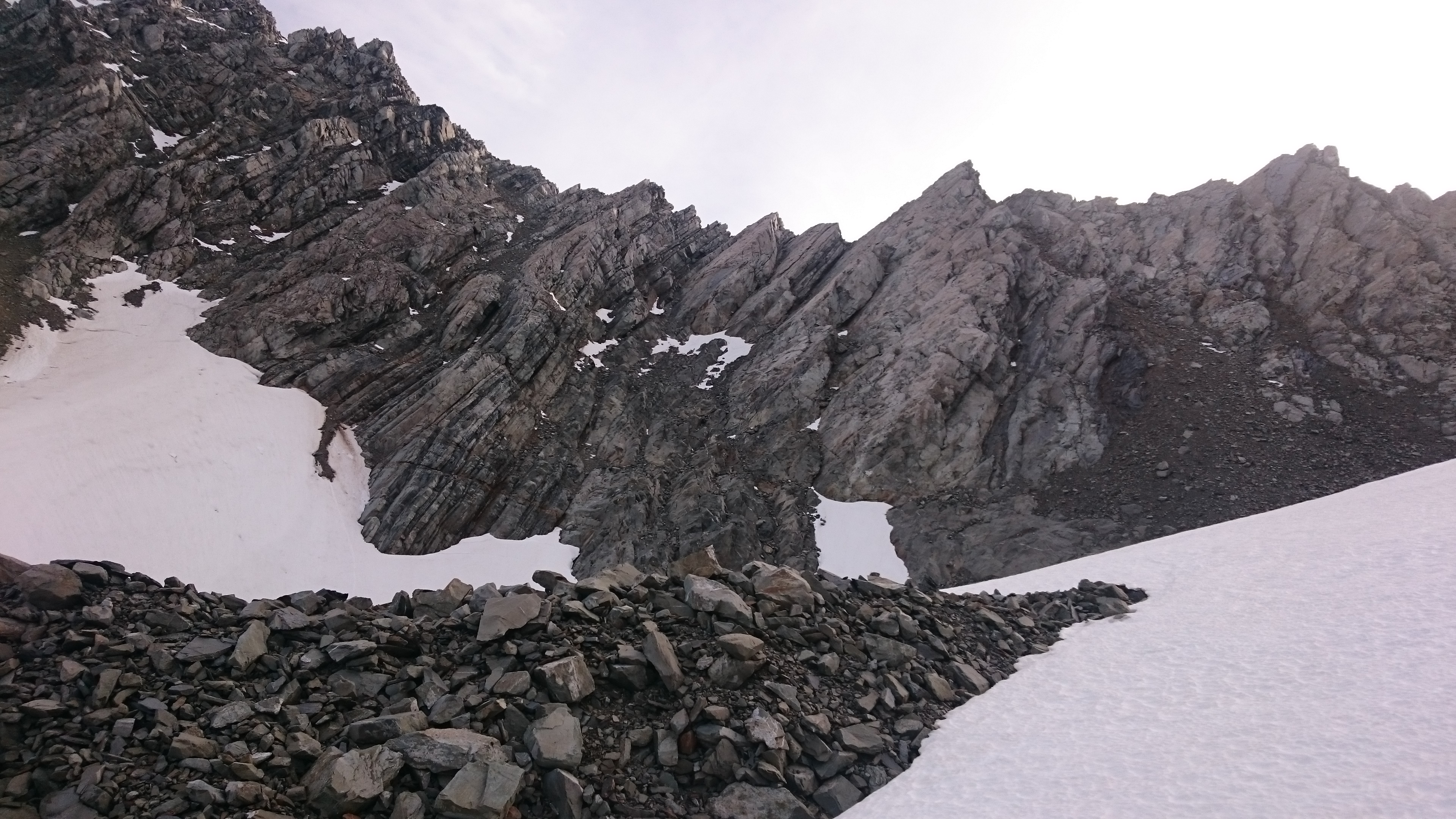
- The western side of Copland Pass

- Location within New Zealand
- Elevation: 2,150 metres (7,050 ft)
- Traversed by: Upper Copland Valley Track

Third Approach
- Location: West Coast / Otago, New Zealand
- Range: Southern Alps
- Coordinates: 43.654°S 170.094°E

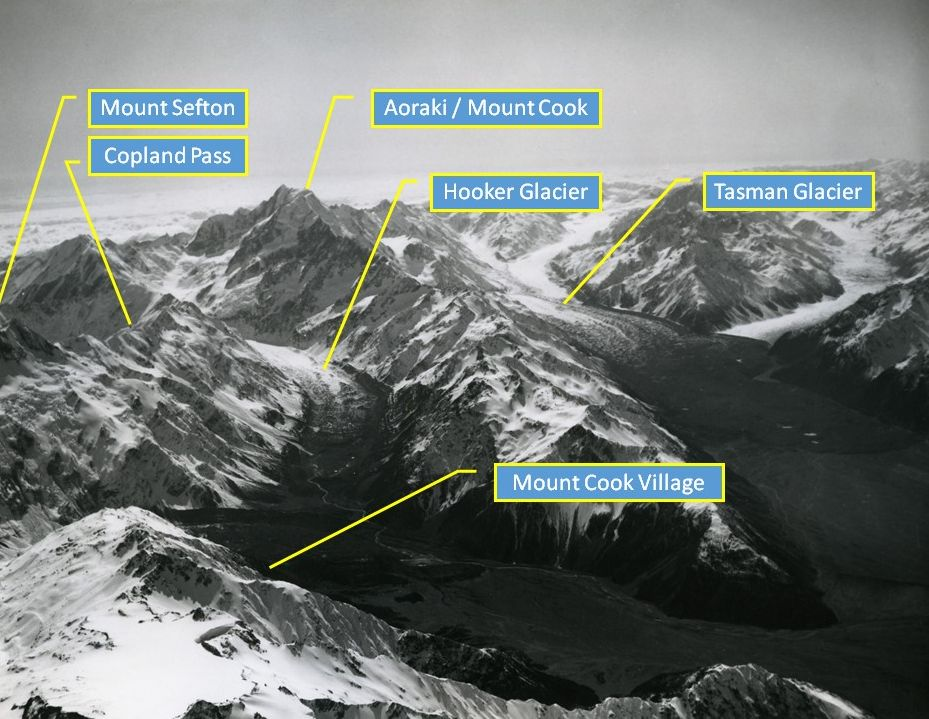
Location of Copland Pass in the Southern Alps

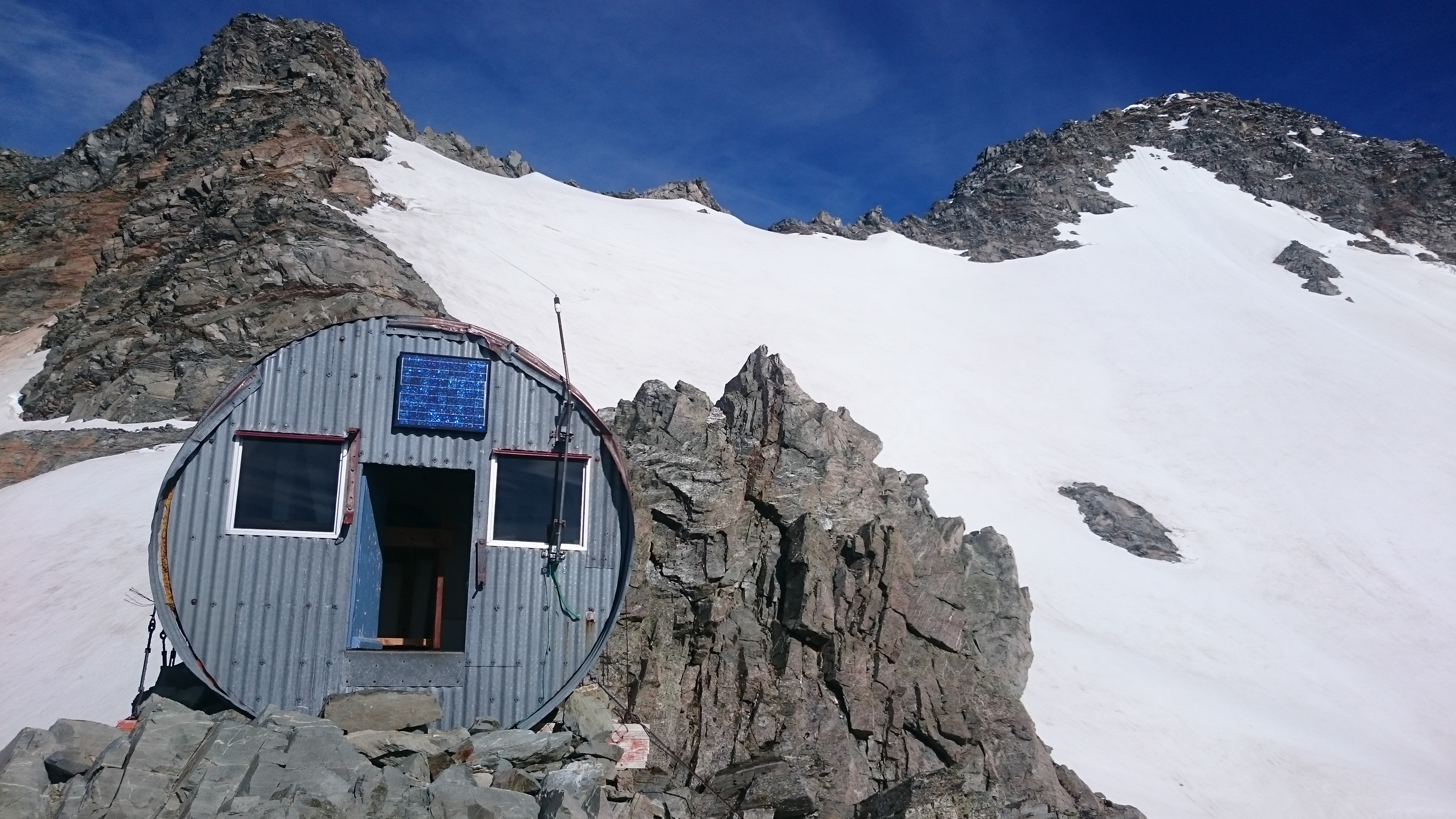
Copland Shelter on the eastern side of the pass at elevation 1,960 m

The Copland Pass (el. 2,150 metres or 7,050 feet) is an alpine pass in the Southern Alps of New Zealand. Known as Noti Hinetamatea by the indigenous Ngāi Tahu, the pass follows the route of the Makaawhio ancestor Hinetamatea and her sons Tātāwhākā and Marupeka.

The Copland Pass is on a traditional tramping route connecting Mount Cook Village with the West Coast of New Zealand, 26 kilometres (16 mi) south of Fox Glacier. The Copland Pass is located on the Main Divide and is thus located on the boundary of Aoraki / Mount Cook and Westland Tai Poutini National Parks.

The Copland River on the western side of the Main Divide may have been named by the surveyor J. G. Roberts for Dr James Copland, an early settler in Otago. Edward FitzGerald and Matthias Zurbriggen crossed the Main Divide just 500 metres (1,600 ft) further south in February 1895 and that pass, with an elevation of 2,109 metres (6,919 ft), has been named FitzGerald Pass. A month later, the mountaineer Arthur Paul Harper was the first non-Māori man to cross the slightly higher Copland Pass (2,150 metres or 7,050 feet) and he named it for the main river draining its western side. Jane Thomson was the first non-Māori woman to cross the pass in 1903.

Since the mid-1990s, the eastern climb towards the pass has experienced heavy erosion, and the Copland Pass has become extremely difficult to climb. The Department of Conservation advises that only parties with a "high level of mountaineering experience and appropriate mountaineering equipment" should attempt the crossing, and that numerous fatalities have occurred over the years. Furthermore, crossings should only be attempted from east to west. The Hooker Hut on the eastern side of the pass, which was on the traditional route for the crossing, is no longer accessible, but is stranded on an eroding moraine.

== Climate ==
The climate of Copland Pass is considered as a tundra climate (ET under the Köppen-Geiger climate classification), due to its high altitude. The average high temperature in February is 13.5 °C (56.3 °F), while the average low temperature in July is -11.8 °C (10.8 °F). Most days in winter often fail to get above freezing point, and the average overnight summer temperatures are slightly below 0 °C (32 °F). Due to the high altitude of Copland Pass, warmth from daylight hours can rapidly dissipate, contributing to the diurnal temperature variation. The average annual temperature at Copland Shelter is 0.3 °C (32.5 °F).

Climate data for Copland Shelter, 1960 m
Month	Jan	Feb	Mar	Apr	May	Jun	Jul	Aug	Sep	Oct	Nov	Dec	Year
Mean daily maximum °C (°F)	13 (55)	13.5 (56.3)	10.8 (51.4)	7.4 (45.3)	3.8 (38.8)	0.5 (32.9)	−0.3 (31.5)	0.1 (32.2)	4.6 (40.3)	6.9 (44.4)	9.1 (48.4)	11 (52)	6.7 (44.1)
Daily mean °C (°F)	5.8 (42.4)	6 (43)	3.8 (38.8)	0.8 (33.4)	−2.3 (27.9)	−5.3 (22.5)	−6 (21)	−4.6 (23.7)	−1.9 (28.6)	0.3 (32.5)	2.3 (36.1)	4.3 (39.7)	0.3 (32.5)
Mean daily minimum °C (°F)	−1.2 (29.8)	−1.3 (29.7)	−3.3 (26.1)	−5.7 (21.7)	−8.5 (16.7)	−11.1 (12.0)	−11.8 (10.8)	−10.7 (12.7)	−8.4 (16.9)	−6.3 (20.7)	−4.5 (23.9)	−2.5 (27.5)	−6.3 (20.7)
Average rainfall mm (inches)	360 (14.2)	230 (9.1)	390 (15.4)	300 (11.8)	323 (12.7)	252 (9.9)	250 (9.8)	270 (10.6)	320 (12.6)	370 (14.6)	340 (13.4)	365 (14.4)	3,770 (148.4)
Source: Climate-data.org, combined averages from Fox Glacier & Mt Cook Village
