= Strauchon River =

River in New Zealand

- Route of the Strauchon River
- Mouth of the Strauchon River Strauchon River (New Zealand)
- Etymology: Named after surveyor John L Strauchon

Location
- Country: New Zealand
- Region: West Coast
- District: Westland

Physical characteristics
- Source: Strauchon Glacier
  - coordinates: 43.6318°S 170.033°E
- Mouth: Copland River
  - coordinates: 43°38′55″S 170°01′08″E
- Length: 5 kilometres (3.1 mi)

Basin features
- Progression: Ruera River → Copland River → Karangarua River → Tasman Sea
- River system: Karangarua River

The Strauchon River is a short river of the West Coast Region of New Zealand's South Island. It flows southwest from the face of the Strauchon Glacier to reach the Copland River five kilometres northwest of Mount Sefton. The river's entire length is within Westland Tai Poutini National Park.

== See also ==
- List of rivers of New Zealand
