= Ruera River =

River in New Zealand

- Route of the Ruera River
- Mouth of the Ruera River Ruera River (New Zealand)

Location
- Country: New Zealand
- Region: West Coast
- District: Westland

Physical characteristics
- Source: Lyttle Glacier
  - location: Navigator Range
  - coordinates: 43.5986°S 169.9771°E
- Mouth: Copland River
  - coordinates: 43°38′01″S 169°58′25″E
- Length: 5 kilometres (3.1 mi)

Basin features
- Progression: Ruera River → Copland River → Karangarua River → Tasman Sea
- River system: Karangarua River
- Tributaries
  - left: Darkwater Stream

The Ruera River is a river of the West Coast Region of New Zealand's South Island. It flows south from the Navigator Range in the Southern Alps, reaching the Copland River 30 kilometres east of Bruce Bay. The river's entire length is within Westland Tai Poutini National Park.

== See also ==
- List of rivers of New Zealand
