= James Copland =

James Copland (3 February 1834 – 9 November 1902) was a New Zealand presbyterian minister, doctor and writer.

== Early life and education ==
Copland was born in Edinburgh, Midlothian, Scotland on 3 February 1834. He studied theology and arts graduating with an MA from the University of Edinburgh in 1854 and a PhD from Heidelberg University in 1858. In 1864 he qualified in medicine from the University of Aberdeen with an MD.

== Career ==
Copland emigrated to New Zealand in 1864 as surgeon on the ship EP Bouverie. Although his aim was to be a medical missionary he was ordained as a Presbyterian minister in 1865 and became a minister in Lawrence and then in North Dunedin. On resigning from the ministry in 1881, after a conflict between the North Dunedin congregation and the church hierarchy, he then practised as a doctor. He moved to Gore in 1888, where he died on 9 November 1902.

Copland was editor of the church magazine Evangelist from 1869 to 1879. He refuted Darwin's theories in his book The origin and spiritual nature of man.

== Personal life ==
Copland married twice and had six children. One son George Anderson Copland was also a doctor who practised with his father in Gore.

== Legacy ==
It is believed that the surveyor George John Roberts named the Copland River on the West Coast of New Zealand for Copland, with the name later adopted for an alpine pass and a glacier.

== Publications ==
- Copland, J. (1885). The origin and spiritual nature of man. James Horsburgh.
