= Jacobs River (New Zealand) =

River in New Zealand

Makawhio / Jacobs River
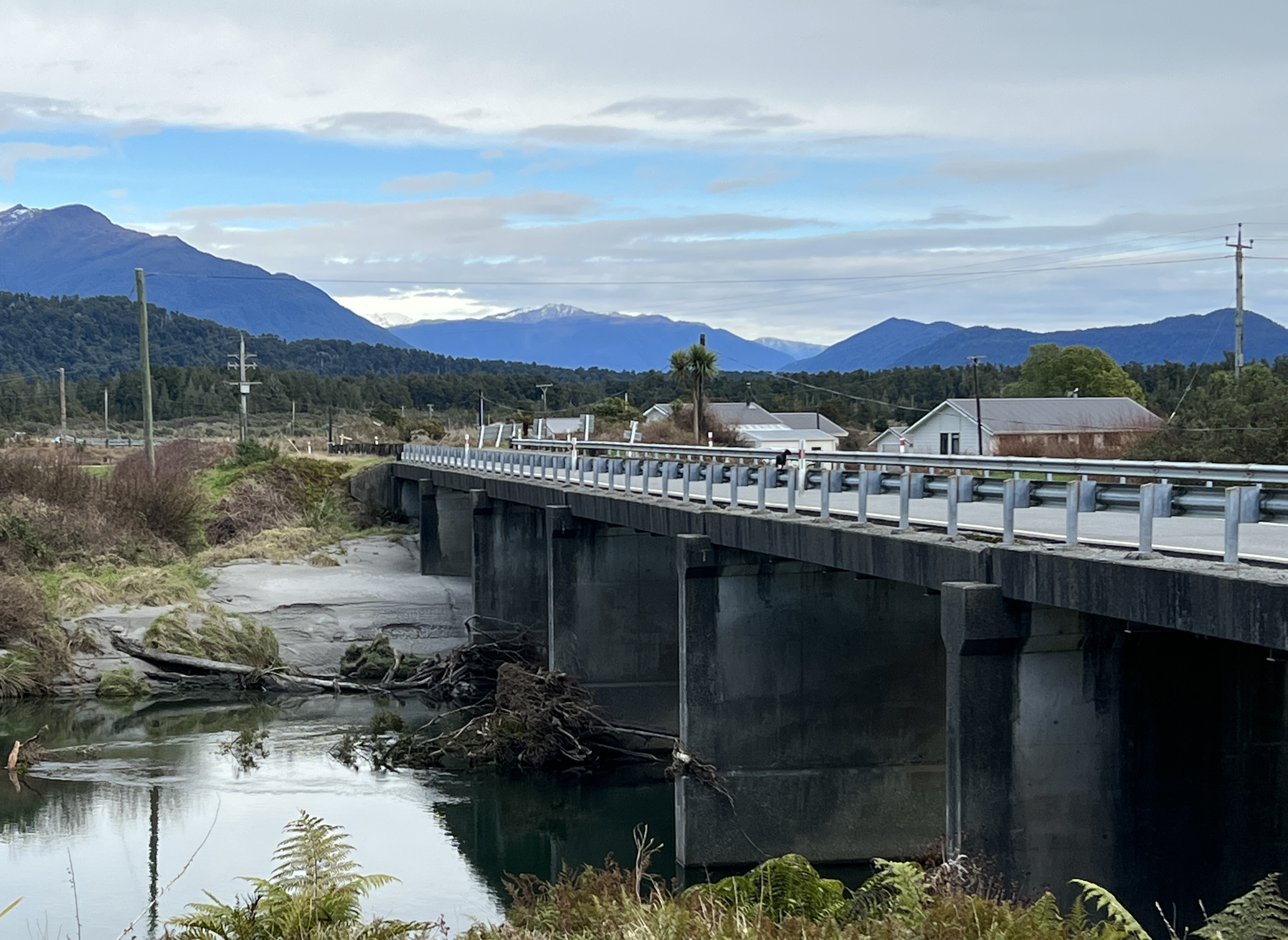
- The State Highway 6 bridge over the Makawhio River / Jacobs River
- Route of the Makawhio / Jacobs River
- Mouth of the Makawhio / Jacobs River Jacobs River (New Zealand) (South Island)
- Etymology: From Kāi Tahu Māori: stream of whio; also named after Hākopa Kāpō, a ferryman at the river mouth.
- Native name: Makaawhio (Māori)

Location
- Country: New Zealand
- region: West Coast Region
- District: Westland District

Physical characteristics
- Source: Bannock Brae Range
  - location: Southern Alps / Kā Tiritiri o te Moana
  - coordinates: 43.738933°S 169.859834°E
  - elevation: 1,340 m (4,400 ft)
- Mouth: Bruce Bay
  - location: Tasman Sea
  - coordinates: 43.56672°S 169.63587°E
  - elevation: 0 m (0 ft)
- Length: 32 km (20 mi)

Basin features
- Tributaries
  - left: Greer Creek, Kini Creek, Papakeri Creek
  - right: Jumbo Creek, Pavo Creek, Hermann Creek

The Jacobs River or Makawhio River is located some 30 km (19 mi) south of Fox Glacier in South Westland, New Zealand. From its headwaters near Fettes Peak below the Hooker Range it flows in a westerly direction to enter the Tasman Sea near Hunts Beach. Its tributaries include Jumbo Creek and Pavo Creek. Just upstream from the bridge is Borat Flat.

The river is of cultural significance to Ngāi Tahu, a South Island iwi (tribe), which holds manawhenua or tribal authority over the land in accordance with the Ngāi Tahu Claims Settlement Act 1998. There are a number of sacred sites and burial places along the river. The river has also been a source of seafood for Ngāi Tahu, and is a source of Aotea, a rock containing kyanite that is only found in the river. In 2016 GNS Science was awarded funding to investigate the commercial potential of Aotea.
