= Copland River =

New Zealand river

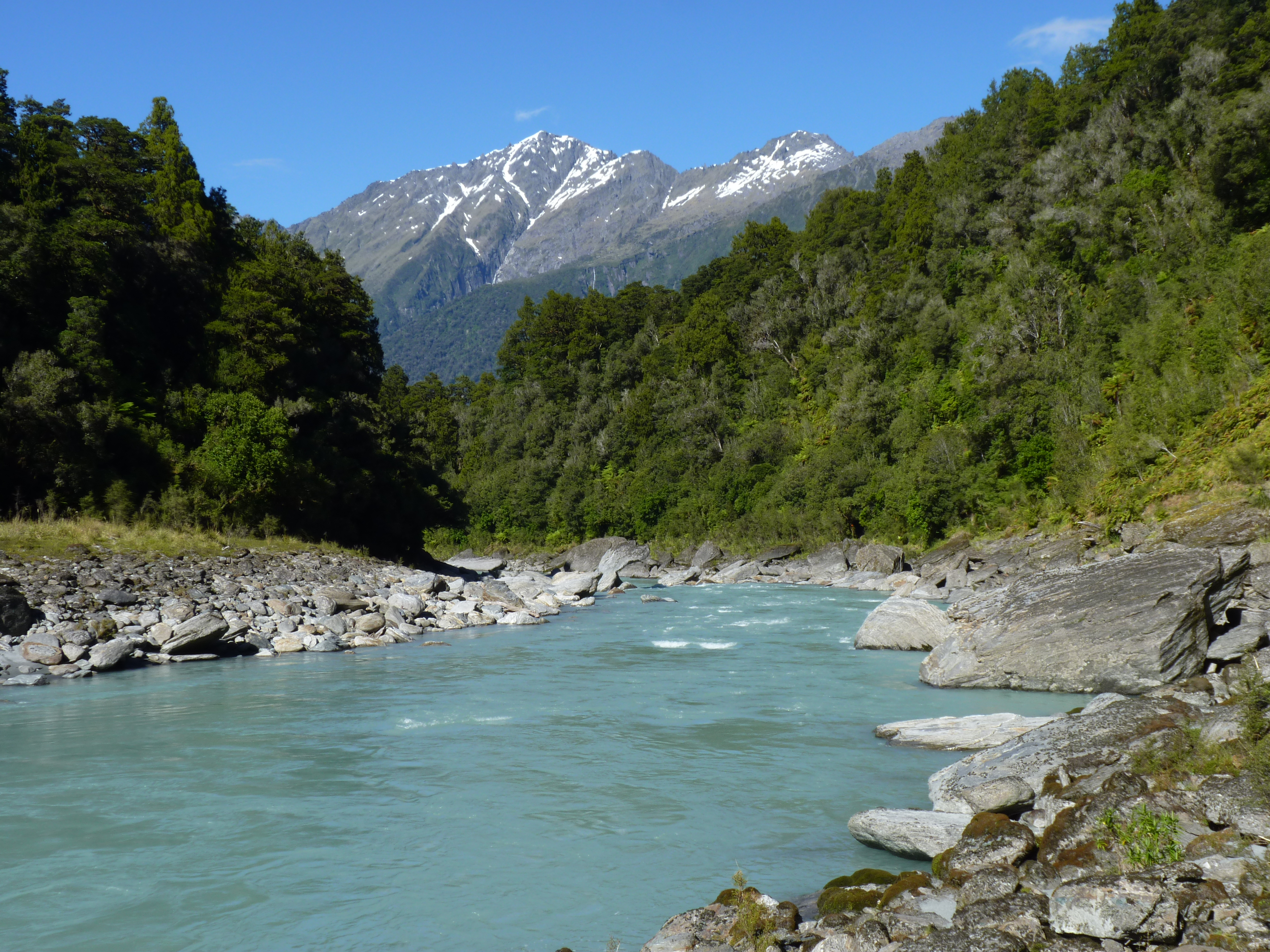
- The Copland River, as seen from the Copland Track
- Route of the Copland River
- Mouth of the Copland River Copland River (New Zealand)
- Etymology: Likely named after James Copland

Location
- Country: New Zealand
- Region: West Coast
- District: Westland

Physical characteristics
- Source: Copland Glacier
  - location: Aroarokaehe Range
  - coordinates: 43.639°S 170.0764°E
  - elevation: 1,090 m (3,580 ft)
- Mouth: Karangarua River
  - location: 8 km (5.0 mi) south of Karangarua
  - coordinates: 43°36′40″S 169°50′11″E
  - elevation: 55 m (180 ft)
- Length: 24 km (15 mi)

Basin features
- Progression: Copland Glacier → Copland River → Karangarua River → Tasman Sea
- River system: Karangarua River
- Tributaries
  - left: Flashing Creek, Tekano Creek, Bluewater Creek, Scott Creek, Splinter Creek, Crag Creek, Creamy Creek, Sparkling Creek, Therma Creek
  - right: Strauchon River, Jungle Creek, Ruera River, Foam Creek, Shiels Creek, Open Creek, Palaver Creek, Tātāwhākā Creek, Architect Creek, McPhee Creek, Kōmarupeka Creek, Katau Creek

The Copland River is a river on the West Coast of the South Island of New Zealand. It flows for 20 kilometres (12 mi) from its headwaters in the Southern Alps / Kā Tiritiri o te Moana to its confluence with the Karangarua River.

The headwaters of the Copland lie only 8 kilometres (5 mi) northwest of Aoraki / Mount Cook in a valley overlooked by the peaks of Mount Sefton and Dilemma Peak. A popular tramping track known as the Copland Track follows the river and leads to the Welcome Flat hot springs. The track leads onto the Copland Pass and the Copland Glacier.

The river lies within the Westland Tai Poutini National Park.

== History ==
In the 1890s New Zealand surveyor‑explorer Charlie Douglas conducted an expedition up the Copland River.
