= Troyte River =

River in New Zealand

- Route of the Troyte River
- Mouth of the Troyte River Troyte River (New Zealand)

Location
- Country: New Zealand
- Region: West Coast
- District: Westland

Physical characteristics
- Source: Hooker Range
  - location: Southern Alps / Kā Tiritiri o te Moana
  - coordinates: 43.7391°S 169.92°E
- Mouth: Karangarua River
  - coordinates: 43°42′52″S 169°53′28″E
- Length: 6 kilometres (3.7 mi)

Basin features
- Progression: Troyte River → Karangarua River → Tasman Sea
- River system: Karangarua River

The Troyte River is a river of the West Coast region of New Zealand's South Island. It rises in the Hooker Range, 15 kilometres west of Aoraki / Mount Cook, flowing west then north to reach the Karangarua River.

== See also ==
- List of rivers of New Zealand
