= Douglas River =

River in New Zealand

Douglas River Twain River
- Route of the Douglas River
- Mouth of the Douglas River Douglas River (New Zealand)
- Etymology: Named after Charlie Douglas, an explorer of the region

Location
- Country: New Zealand
- Region: West Coast
- District: Westland

Physical characteristics
- Source: Douglas Glacier
  - location: Southern Alps / Kā Tiritiri o te Moana
  - coordinates: 43.6965°S 169.9377°E
  - elevation: 975 m (3,199 ft)
- Mouth: Karangarua River
  - location: Cassel Flat
  - coordinates: 43°40′03″S 169°49′48″E
  - elevation: 178 m (584 ft)
- Length: 18 kilometres (11 mi)

Basin features
- Progression: Douglas Glacier → Douglas River → Karangarua River → Tasman Sea
- River system: Karangarua River

The Douglas River, formerly known as the Twain, is a river of the West Coast of New Zealand's South Island. Its source is high in the Southern Alps / Kā Tiritiri o te Moana, five kilometres (3.1 mi) south of Mount Sefton, and its upper reaches are fed by water from the Douglas Glacier. It flows west for 18 kilometres (11 mi), joined by runoff from the Horace Walker Glacier, before joining the waters of the Karangarua River. The Douglas River's entire course is within Westland Tai Poutini National Park. The river and glacier are named after Charles Edward Douglas, a 19th-century explorer and mountaineer.

The New Zealand Department of Conservation maintains a backcountry hut at the junction of the Douglas and Horace Walker rivers.

== See also ==
- List of rivers of New Zealand
