= Douglas Glacier (Westland) =

Glacier in New Zealand's Southern Alps

- Location within New Zealand
- Coordinates: 43.68°S 170.00°E
- Length: 3.5 km (2.2 mi)
- Width: 500 m (1,600 ft)
- Status: Retreating

The Douglas Glacier is a glacier in New Zealand's Southern Alps located between Mount Sefton and Mount Brunner. It is named after the explorer Charles Edward Douglas.

The glacier sits in a valley and is fed by several streams and frequent avalanches which drop down a cliff face of over 1,000 feet from its névé to the north. The glacier itself was approximately 5 miles long in 1908. The glacier has a relatively high rate of moraine materials, consisting of "friable phyllites and schistose grauwackes".

At the foot of the glacier is a lake that was created by glacier recession. Reports from 1892 and 1934 indicated it had "an anomalously slow lake development". The Douglas River (formerly known as the Twain) begins in the lake at the foot of the glacier.
