= Douglas Lake (Minnesota) =

Lake in the state of Minnesota, United States

- Location within Minnesota
- Location: Aitkin County, Minnesota
- Coordinates: 46°37′45″N 93°5′25″W
- Type: Lake
- Surface elevation: 1,263 feet (385 m)

Douglas Lake is a lake in Aitkin County, Minnesota, in the United States.

Douglas Lake was named for E. Douglas, who owned land near the lake.

== See also ==
- List of lakes in Minnesota
