= Mount Burns (New Zealand) =

Mountain in New Zealand

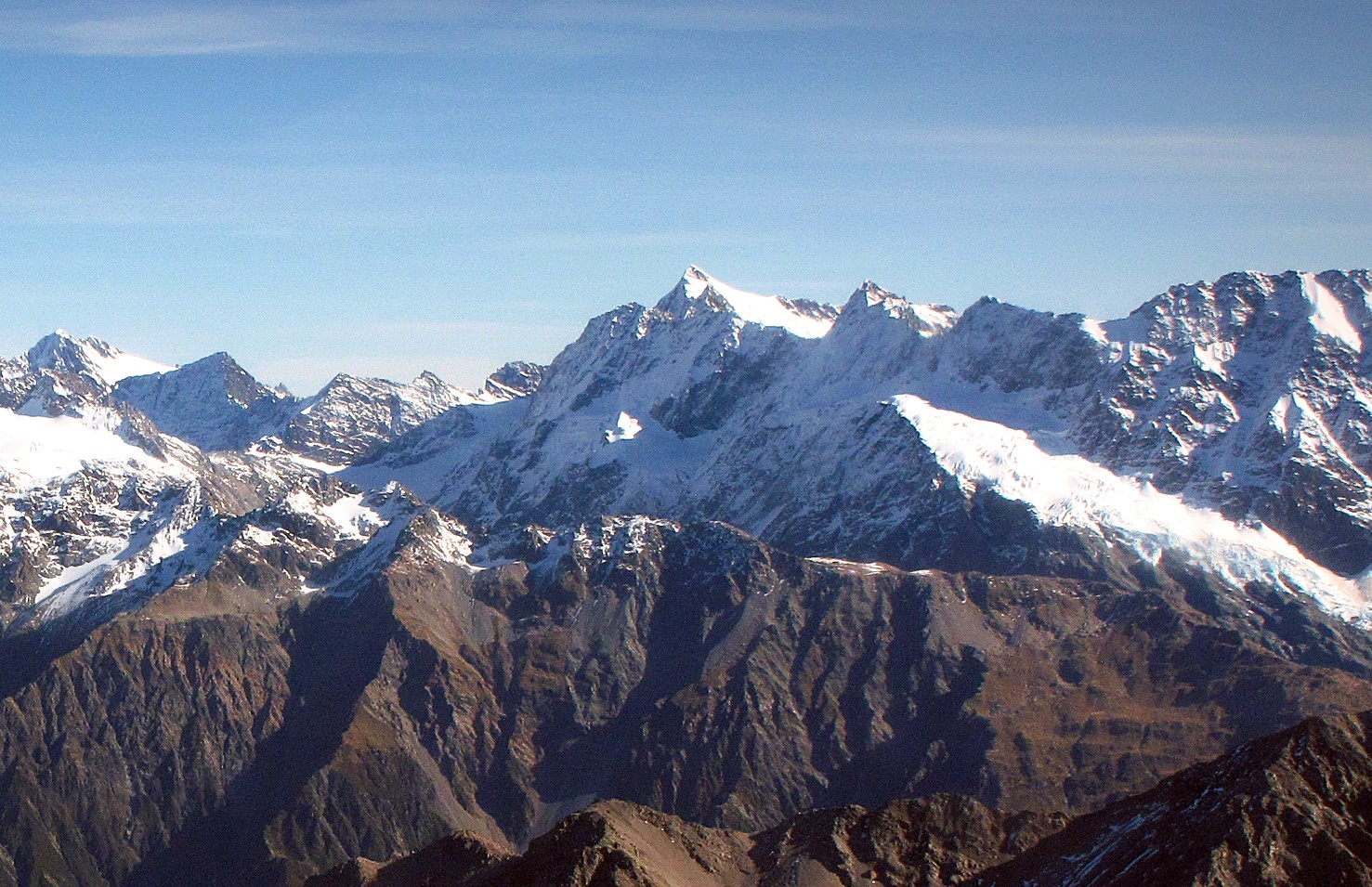
- Summit centred on skyline Aerial view from east-northeast

Highest point
- Elevation: 2,746 m (9,009 ft)
- Prominence: 371 m (1,217 ft)
- Isolation: 7.44 km (4.62 mi)
- Listing: New Zealand #22
- Coordinates: 43°44′43″S 169°59′03″E

Geography
- Location within New Zealand
- Interactive map of Mount Burns
- Location: South Island
- Country: New Zealand
- Region: Canterbury / West Coast
- Protected area: Aoraki / Mount Cook National Park
- Parent range: Southern Alps
- Topo map(s): NZMS260 H36; Topo50 BY15

Climbing
- First ascent: 1909
- Easiest route: Welchman Glacier Route

Mount Burns is a 2,746-metre-elevation (9,009-foot) mountain in New Zealand.

== Description ==
Mount Burns is located on the crest or Main Divide of the Southern Alps and is situated on the boundary shared by the Canterbury and West Coast Regions of the South Island. This peak is situated nine kilometres (5.6 mi) west of Mount Cook Village and set on the southern boundary of Aoraki / Mount Cook National Park. Precipitation runoff from the mountain drains west into the headwaters of the Landsborough River, and east to the Hooker River. Topographic relief is significant as the summit rises 1,150 metres (3,773 feet) above McKerrow Glacier in 1.5 kilometre. The nearest higher peak is Mount Sefton, eight kilometres to the north-northeast. The mountain's namesake is not documented, however the Poet Glacier on the west slope hints that Robert Burns could be who the mountain is named after.

== Climbing ==
The first ascent of the summit was made in 1909 by Alec and Peter Graham, Bernard Head, Darby Thomson, and Lawrence Earle via the McKerrow Face.

Other climbing routes with the first ascents:

- Welchman Glacier Route – Peter Graham, Samuel Turner – (1914)
- Watchtower (South West) Ridge – H.T. Barcham, Ash Cunningham, A. Witten-Hannah – (1952)
- South Face – Brian Weedon, Richard Schmidt – (1980)
- North West Ridge – Rob Frost, Kieran Parsons – (2013)

== Climate ==
Based on the Köppen climate classification, Mount Burns is located in a marine west coast (Cfb) climate zone, with a subpolar oceanic climate (Cfc) at the summit. Prevailing westerly winds blow moist air from the Tasman Sea onto the mountains, where the air is forced upward by the mountains (orographic lift), causing moisture to drop in the form of rain or snow. This climate supports the Welchman, Bannie, and Poet glaciers on the slopes of the peak. The months of December through February offer the most favourable weather for viewing or climbing this peak.

== See also ==
- List of mountains of New Zealand by height
