= Karangarua River =

River in the West Coast Region of New Zealand

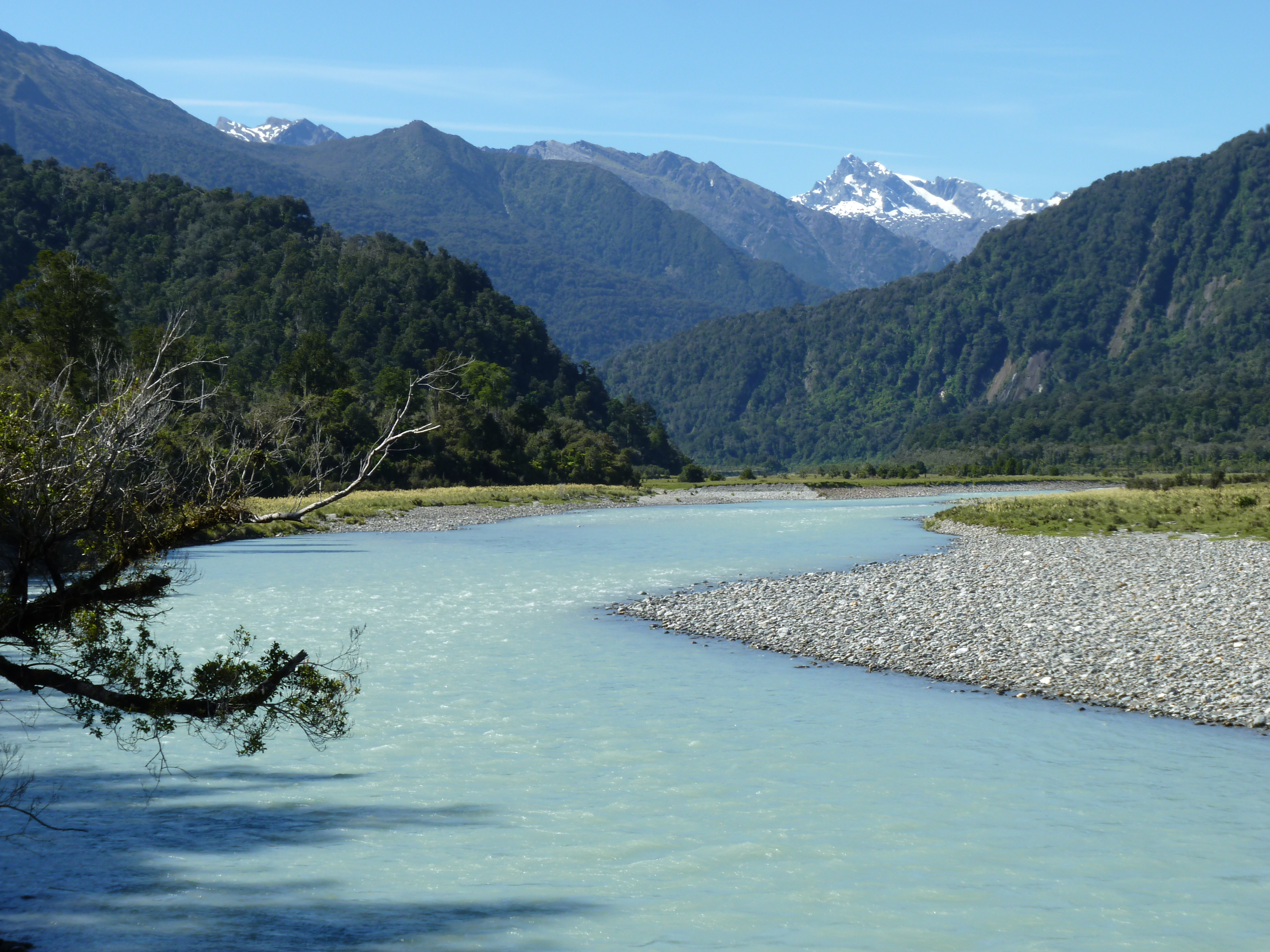
- Karangarua River
- Route of the Karangarua River
- Mouth of the Karangarua River Karangarua River (New Zealand)

Location
- Country: New Zealand
- Region: West Coast
- District: Westland

Physical characteristics
- Source: Karangarua Saddle
  - coordinates: 43.7194°S 169.9424°E
- Mouth: Tasman Sea
  - coordinates: 43°29′44″S 169°43′42″E
  - elevation: 0 m (0 ft)

Basin features
- Progression: Karangarua River → Tasman Sea
- River system: Karangarua River
- Tributaries
  - left: Brassey Creek, Troyte River, Theodore Creek, Jack Creek, Redstone Creek, Tui Creek, Niblick Creek, Curly Creek, Bunker Creek, Purcell Creek, Harkells Creek, McTaggart Creek, Maimai Creek, Gordon Creek
  - right: Baking Oven Creek, Driver Creek, Llewellyn Creek, Lily Creek, Coleridge Creek, Dirty Creek, Douglas River, Regina Creek, Copland River, Rough Creek, Border Creek

The Karangarua River is located in the West Coast Region of New Zealand's South Island. It flows northwest from the Southern Alps, entering the Tasman Sea 80 kilometres northeast of Haast. The main tributary of the Karangarua is the Copland River.
