= Westland Tai Poutini National Park =

National park in New Zealand

- IUCN category II (national park)
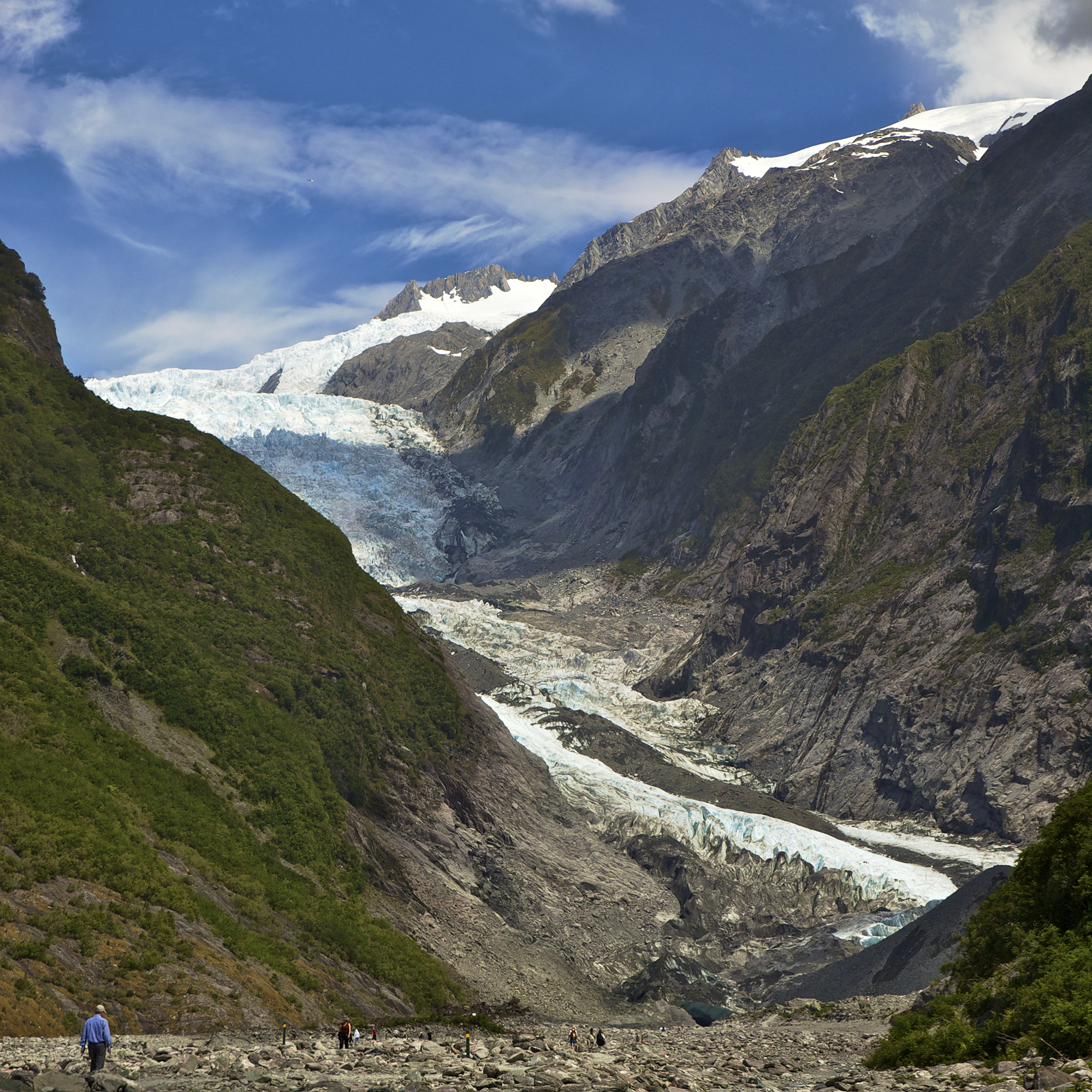
- Franz Josef Glacier in 2011
- Interactive map of Westland Tai Poutini National Park
- Location: West Coast, New Zealand
- Coordinates: 43.567°S 170.083°E
- Area: 1,319.8 km^{2} (509.6 sq mi)
- Established: 1960
- Governing body: Department of Conservation

UNESCO World Heritage Site
- Official name: Te Wāhipounamu – South West New Zealand
- Type: Natural
- Criteria: vii, viii, ix, x
- Designated: 1990 (14th session)
- Reference no.: 551
- Region: Oceania

Westland Tai Poutini National Park is a national park located on the western coast of New Zealand's South Island. Established in 1960 as Westland National Park to commemorate the centenary of the European settlement of Westland District, it covers 1,320 square kilometres (330,000 acres) of largely mountainous terrain and forest. The park borders the Aoraki / Mount Cook National Park along the Main Divide of the Southern Alps, and includes many of the West Coast's glaciers, most notably including the Fox / Te Moeka o Tuawe and Franz Josef / Kā Roimata o Hine Hukatere glaciers.

The small tourist towns of Fox Glacier and Franz Josef / Waiau are the main settlements within the park, while remnants of old gold mining towns can be found along the coast. The park offers hunting opportunities for red deer, chamois, and tahr, while helicopters allow hunters to access the rugged, mountainous areas. The popular Copland Track runs upstream from the Karangarua River bridge. Along with the mountain scenery visible from the track, there are hot springs at Welcome Flat Hut.

== History ==
Ngāi Tahu historically travelled in Westland coastal areas gathering pounamu. Settlements were located along the coast, with larger villages at Maitahi and Makāwhio, and a pā at Ōkārito. The Ngāi Tahu were known to traverse the inland features now in the park, having high familiarity with the landmarks of the area. Many local Māori mountaineers are remembered, and served as guides for European explorers.

Colonial European expansion and settlement in the area was in part driven by desire for coal and gold, leading to the West Coast gold rush in the mid-1860's. The presence of alluvial gold led to mining of beaches and waterways now located within the modern-day park. As a result of the gold rush, settlements at Gillespies Beach, Ōkārito, Three Mile beach and Five Mile beach were created or expanded. The conquest for gold subsided within a decade, though further surveying and familiarity of the area among Europeans led to more visitors seeking out its scenic vistas. Within a short period of time, with access to the area improving, tourism and hospitality-related businesses grew rapidly.

While numerous registered archaeological and historic sites are located in the park, few relate to pre-European history. This under-representation is acknowledged in relation to management of the park, while noting that existing Māori wāhi tapu (sacred sites) are not disclosed.

=== Park expansion ===
The park has been progressively expanded since its establishment, largely through incorporating nearby forest reserves or other conservation land. Ōkārito and Waikukupa State Forests were added to the park in 1982, followed by the upper Karangarua Valley in 1983, North Ōkārito and Saltwater State Forests in 2002, and over 4,400 hectares (11,000 acres) of other land scattered throughout the park in 2010.

== Geography ==
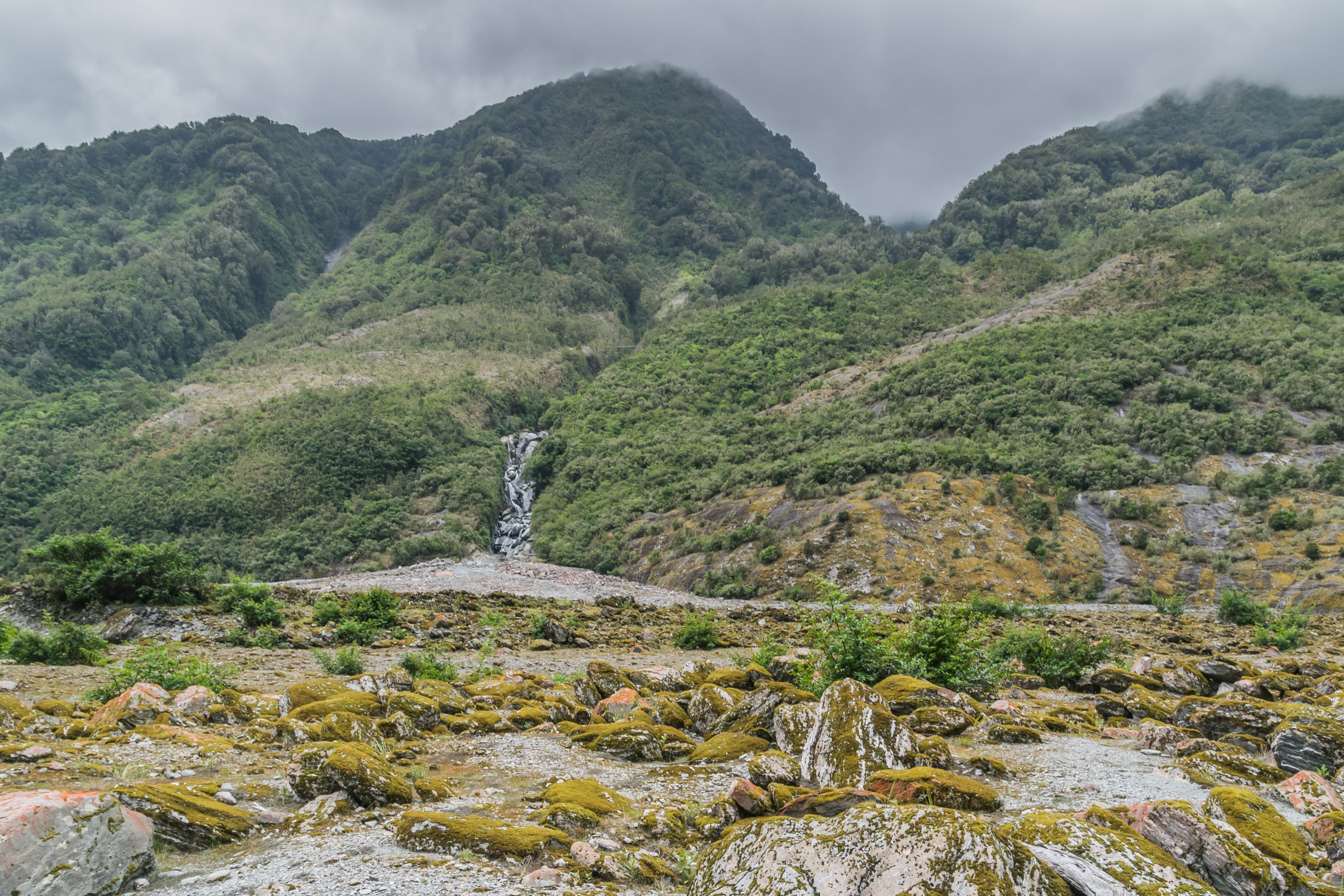
A view of the Baird Range, located in the park.

Westland Tai Poutini National Park covers 1,320 square kilometres (510 sq mi) exclusively on the western side of the South Island's main divide, making it New Zealand's fifth largest national park. The park covers a wide variety of environments, ranging from high alpine tundra near the park's border with Aoraki / Mount Cook National Park to coastal wetlands around Ōkārito Lagoon. This contributes to a large variation in elevation within the park, which extends from sea level to 3,498 metres (11,476 ft) at Mount Tasman. The mountains are also responsible for the high degree of orographic rainfall which occurs in the park due to the prevailing westerlies, contributing in turn to the dense temperate rainforest found throughout the park.

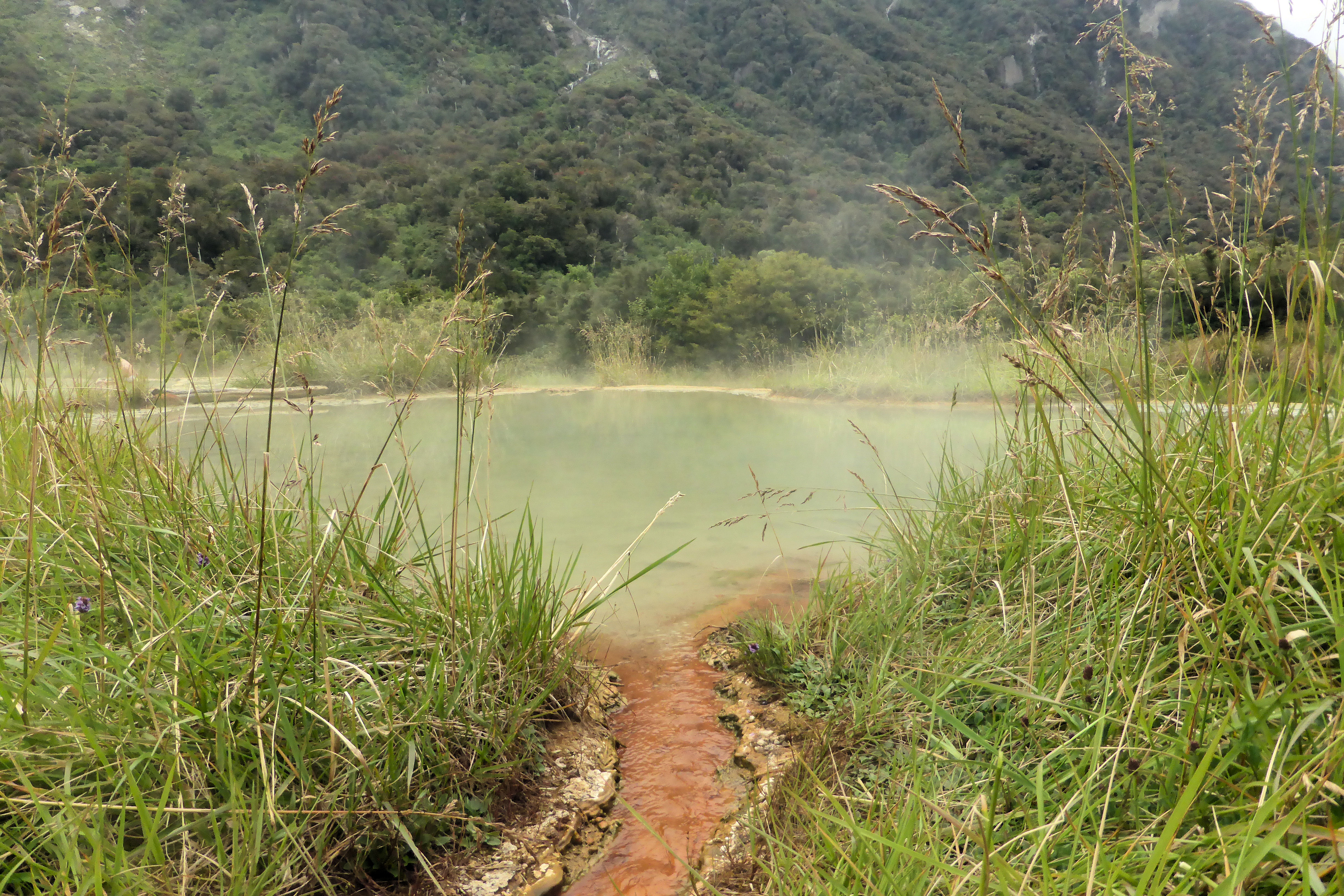
The natural hot pools located at Welcome Flat

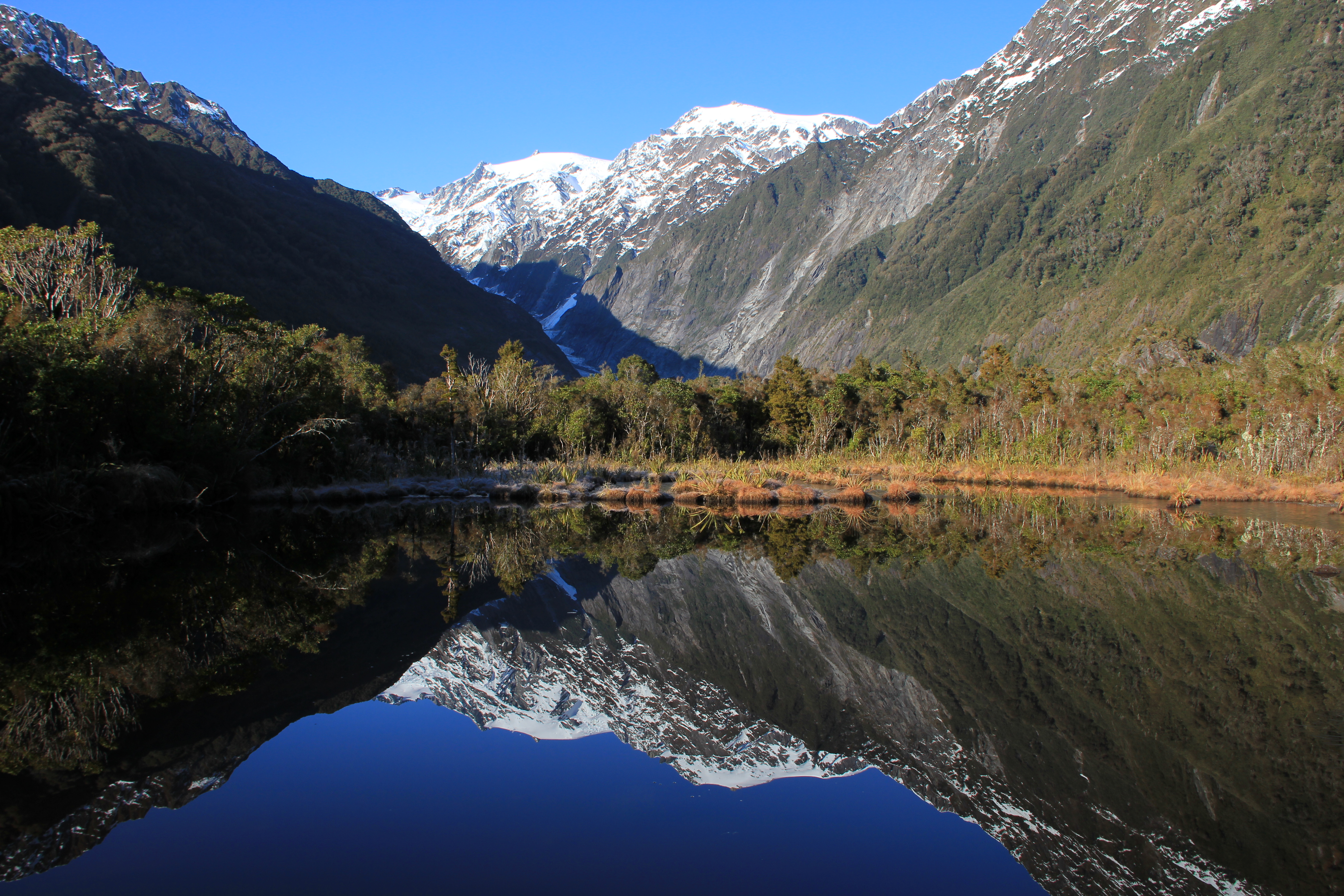
A view across Peters Pool toward the Franz Josef / Kā Roimata o Hine Hukatere

== Ecology ==
=== Fauna ===
The coastal wetlands provide excellent habitat for wading bird species. Lake Māpōurika is home to the threatened Kāmana / Pūteketeke, while Ōkārito Lagoon is known for the presence of kōtuku. Kea are typically found throughout the park.

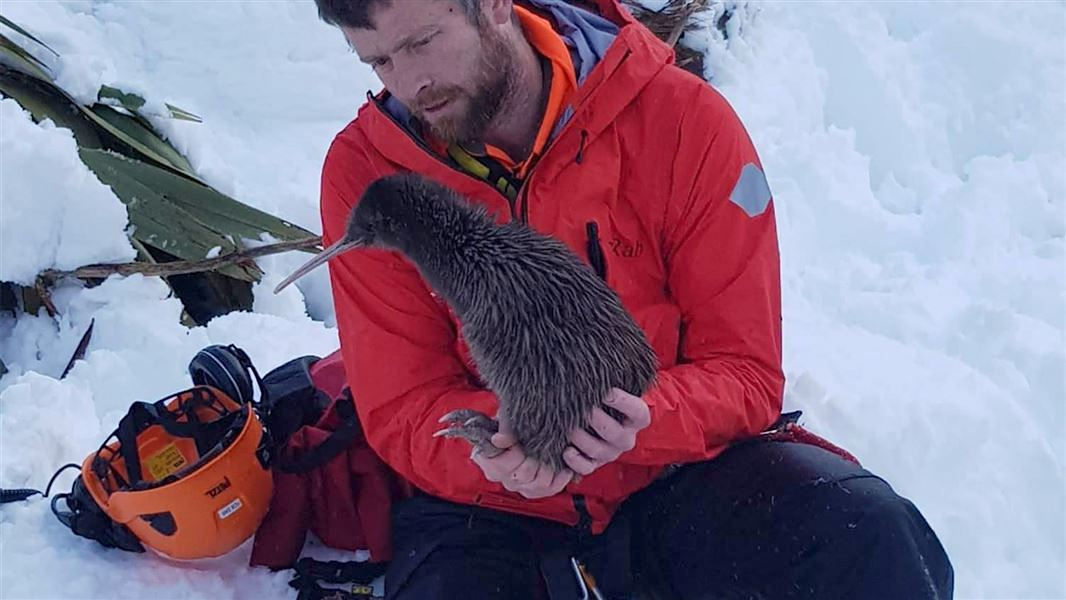
An Alpine Rescue team saving a released rowi that climbed into the mountains behind Fox Glacier

The only population of Okarito kiwi (rowi) reside in the lowland forests of the park.

== See also ==
- National parks of New Zealand
- Conservation in New Zealand
- Tramping in New Zealand
