= Aoraki / Mount Cook National Park =

National park in New Zealand

- IUCN category II (national park)
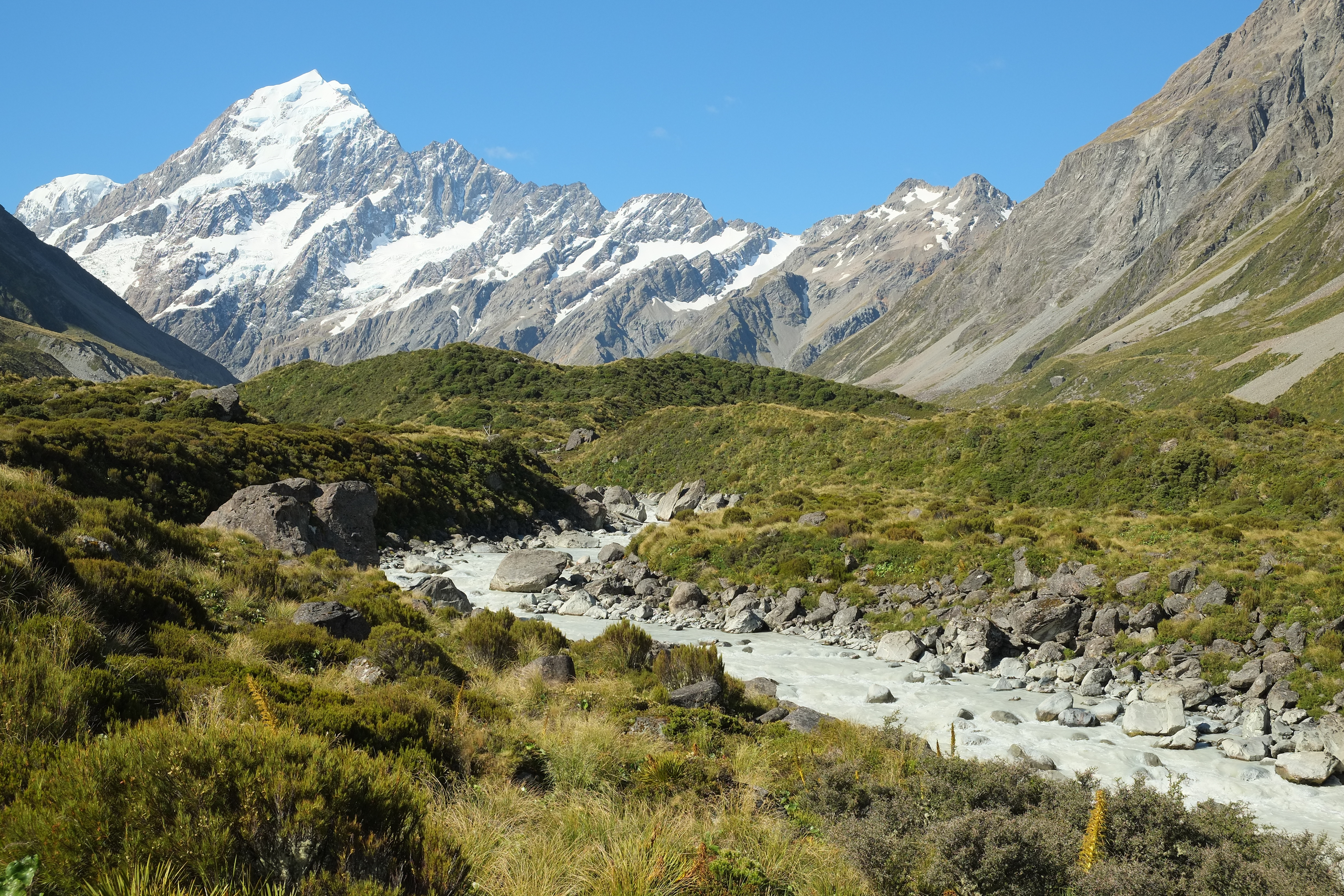
- Hooker Valley within the park as seen from Hooker Valley Track, looking towards Kirikirikatata / Mount Cook Range
- Interactive map of Aoraki / Mount Cook National Park
- Location: South Island, New Zealand
- Nearest town: Mount Cook Village
- Coordinates: 43°44′S 170°6′E
- Area: 707 km^{2} (273 sq mi)
- Established: 1953
- Governing body: Department of Conservation
- World Heritage site: 1990

UNESCO World Heritage Site
- Official name: Te Wāhipounamu – South West New Zealand
- Type: Natural
- Criteria: vii, viii, ix, x
- Designated: 1990 (14th session)
- Reference no.: 551
- Region: Oceania

Aoraki / Mount Cook National Park is a national park located in the Canterbury Region in the central-west of the South Island of New Zealand. It was established in October 1953 and takes its name from the highest mountain in New Zealand, Aoraki / Mount Cook. The area of the park is 707 km^{2} (273 mi^{2}), and it shares a border with Westland Tai Poutini National Park along the Main Divide of the Southern Alps. The national park consists of reserves that were established as early as 1885 to protect the area's significant landscape and vegetation. Glaciers cover 40% of the park, including the country's largest glacier, Haupapa / Tasman Glacier. In 1990, the park was included in the area designated as the Te Wāhipounamu World Heritage Site. The park is managed by the Department of Conservation (DOC) alongside Ngāi Tahu, the iwi who are mana whenua in the region.

At the end of the most recent ice age approximately 13000 years ago, numerous glaciers in the park were tributaries of a much larger glacier covering all of Hooker Valley and Tasman Valley in hundreds of metres of ice. This glacier reached beyond the southern end of today's Lake Pukaki, up to 40 km (25 mi) south of Aoraki / Mount Cook National Park. As it retreated, it filled the hollowed-out valleys, leaving behind the U-shaped valleys seen today in the national park. Early European surveyors and explorers ventured into the alpine region surrounding Aoraki / Mount Cook from the 1850s. Many of the geographical features in the national park were named by or after them. The Ngāi Tahu Claims Settlement Act passed in October 1998 recognised the original names of some geographical features, establishing dual English / Māori names.

Aoraki / Mount Cook National Park is home to more than four hundred species of plants, including more than one hundred introduced species. There are about thirty-five species of birds in the park, most notably the rare black stilt and pīwauwau. The only road access into the park is via State Highway 80 which starts 65 km (40 mi) away near Twizel, the closest town, and leads directly to Mount Cook Village along the western shore of Lake Pukaki. Mount Cook Aerodrome is a small airfield located 5 km (3.1 mi) southeast of Mount Cook Village within the national park.

Aoraki / Mount Cook National Park is a popular tourist destination. There are numerous walking tracks, the most popular being the Hooker Valley Track, a relatively short track that takes around three hours to complete. The park is also popular with astrophotographers and star-gazers because of the low levels of light pollution. An area including Aoraki / Mount Cook National Park and the Mackenzie Basin was designated as the Aoraki Mackenzie International Dark Sky Reserve in June 2012. The national park has been used as a filming location for numerous films.

== History ==
=== Early Māori history ===
In Māori mythology, Aoraki was one of the sons of Raki the Sky Father. One version of the legend states that Aoraki came down from heaven in a canoe with three of his brothers, Rakiroa, Rakirua and Rārakiroa, to visit his father Raki's new wife Papatūānuku, but the waka (canoe) overturned. The brothers climbed on to the overturned canoe, becoming the mountains Aoraki / Mount Cook, Rakiroa (Mount Dampier), Rakirua (Mount Teichelmann) and Rārakiroa (Mount Tasman). The waka itself became the Southern Alps (Kā Tiritiri o te Moana).

Although there is no evidence of permanent or temporary Māori settlement within the national park, some artefacts and evidence of burnt vegetation have been found in the nearby Mackenzie Basin. These may be related to nomadic parties who would spend months here hunting moa or fighting other parties. Māori would burn tōtara forests to assist them with their hunting of moa and gathering food, mostly weka, eels and kiore, before heading to the West Coast in search of pounamu.

In 1896, mountaineer Arthur Harper wrote that Māori had a deep-seated fear of the mountains and preferred to stay lower down in the valleys. However, Māori did have knowledge of the various features of high alpine areas, with special words for different types of ice and snow. Historian Johannes Carl Andersen believed it was possible that Māori had travelled over the Main Divide, which is at the northern boundary of Aoraki / Mount Cook National Park, to trade pounamu.

=== Later history ===
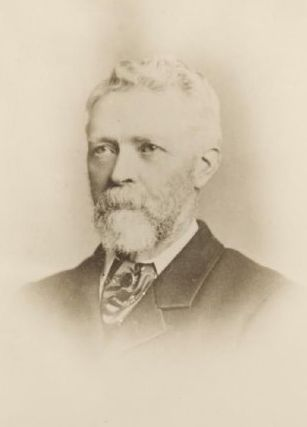
Many of the geographical features of the region were named by or for early explorers, such as the Sealy Tarns track being named after Edward Sealy.

According to log entries made by explorer Abel Tasman, it is likely that he and his crew sighted the Southern Alps in December 1642 from the Tasman Sea near Barrytown. In 1770 Captain James Cook sailed along the West Coast of the South Island. He sighted and named the Southern Alps but probably did not sight Aoraki. Aoraki was given the name Mount Cook by Captain Stokes of the survey ship HMS Acheron in 1851, to honour James Cook's circumnavigation of New Zealand. In 1998, the Ngāi Tahu Claims Settlement Act officially recognised the original names of the geographical features of Ngāi Tahu's takiwā (tribal area), establishing dual English and Māori names such as Kirikirikatata / Mount Cook Range and Haupapa / Tasman Glacier.

Europeans have had interest in the national park since the 1850s; public appreciation of the alpine regions surrounding Aoraki / Mount Cook grew with the maps and reports produced by early European surveyors and explorers. Julius von Haast explored the area at the head of Lakes Tekapo, Pukaki and Ōhau in 1862, collecting specimens, making maps and writing comprehensive reports on his observations, and, starting in 1867, surveyor Edward Sealy explored many glaciers. Many of the peaks, glaciers and other geographical features of the region were named by or for these early explorers, such as the Sealy Tarns track being named after Edward Sealy and the Mueller Glacier named after Ferdinand von Mueller.

Public appreciation of the mountains also grew as images of the area began to circulate. Artists painted pictures, and from 1867–1870 Sealy photographed the Mount Cook region. In 1873 the then Governor of New Zealand, Sir George Bowen, visited the Mount Cook region, thereby further raising the profile of the area. Parts of Aoraki / Mount Cook National Park were first set aside as a recreation reserve in 1885, and the national park was established in October 1953.

In 1990, the park (along with Westland Tai Poutini, Mount Aspiring and Fiordland National Parks) became part of the Te Wahipounamu World Heritage Site, the first place in New Zealand to attain World Heritage Status. Following the settlement between Ngāi Tahu and the Crown in October 1998, a number of South Island place names were amended by the Ngāi Tahu Claims Settlement Act 1998 to incorporate their Māori names. The name of the mountain village and national park were officially changed from Mount Cook to Aoraki / Mount Cook.

== Establishment as a national park ==
Efforts to protect the alpine environment began in the 19th century. A petition addressed to James Sutter, a member of Parliament, was circulated in November 1884, requesting that the Government protect the alpine region around Aoraki / Mount Cook. Petitioners were concerned that stock grazing and burn-offs were destroying the native bush and vegetation of the area. The petitioners suggested that Frank Huddleston, who had recently bought land at the base of the Mueller Glacier and was building the Hermitage, be appointed as a ranger to oversee the area.

In January 1885 the Hooker and Mueller Valleys were gazetted as the Hooker Glacier Recreation Reserve. In 1887 the Government permanently reserved an area of 97,800 acres of the Tasman Valley above the Mueller Valley confluence, which was known as the Tasman Recreation Reserve or Tasman Park. The Hooker Glacier reserve was expanded in 1890, becoming the 38,000-acre Aorangi Domain.

In 1953, Tasman Park and Aorangi Domain became the Mount Cook National Park. The park as established covered 151,780 acres (614.2 km^{2}) of the Southern Alps, including the Mueller, Hooker, and Tasman glaciers and the eastern slopes of Aoraki / Mount Cook and Mount Tasman. The park is managed by the Department Of Conservation and Ngāi Tahu, the iwi who hold mana whenua status of the land.

== Geography ==
=== Topography ===
The park stretches for about 60 km (37 mi) along the southwest–northeast direction of the Southern Alps, covering 722 km^{2} (279 sq mi) on the south-eastern side of the main spine of the Alps. Of New Zealand's 20 peaks over 3,000 m (9,800 ft), all except Mount Aspiring / Tititea lie within the park. These include New Zealand's highest mountain, Aoraki / Mount Cook, at 3,724 m (12,218 ft). Other prominent peaks in or nearby the national park include Mount Tasman, Mount Hicks, Mount Sefton and Mount Elie de Beaumont.

=== Glaciers ===
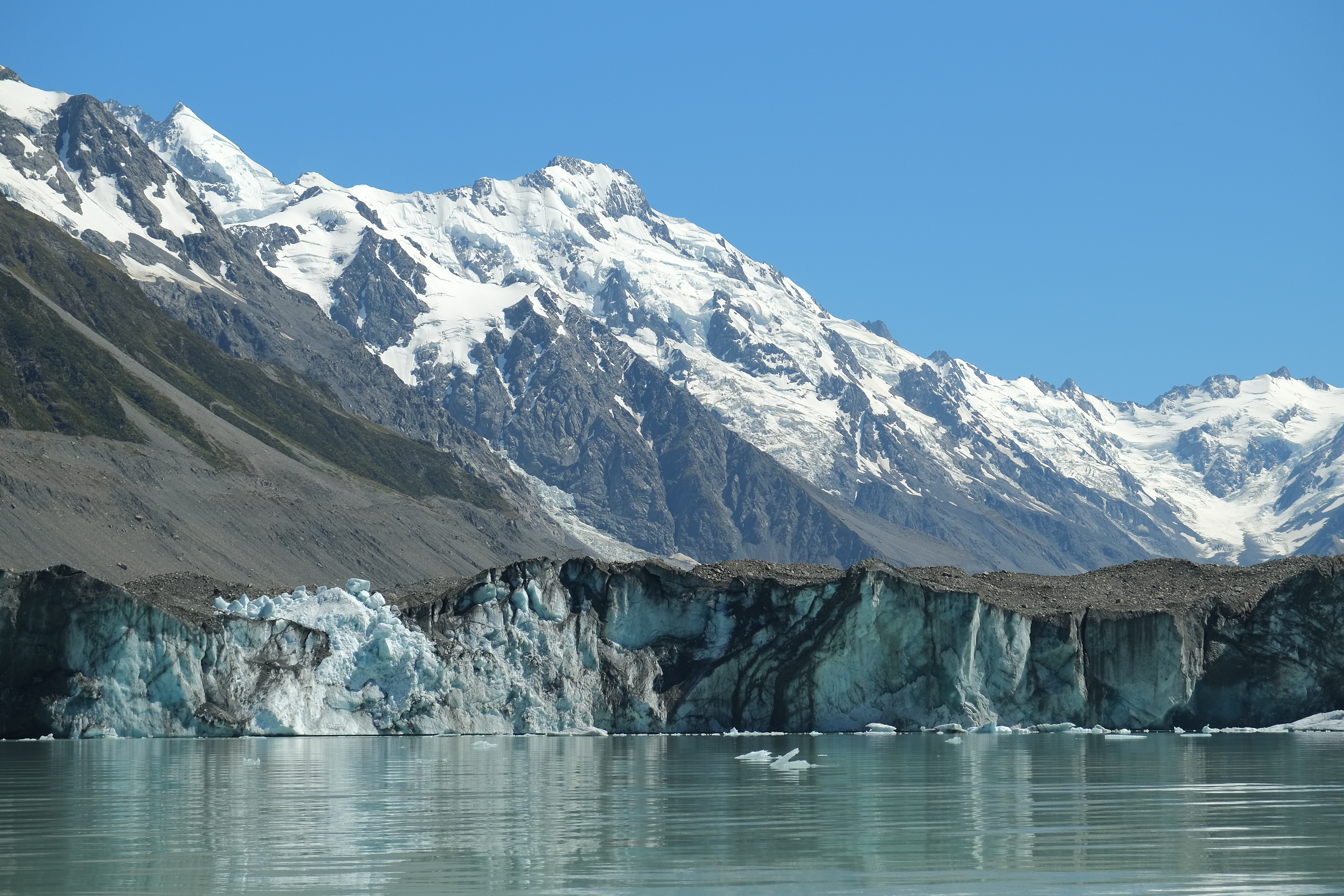
Tasman Glacier terminal face

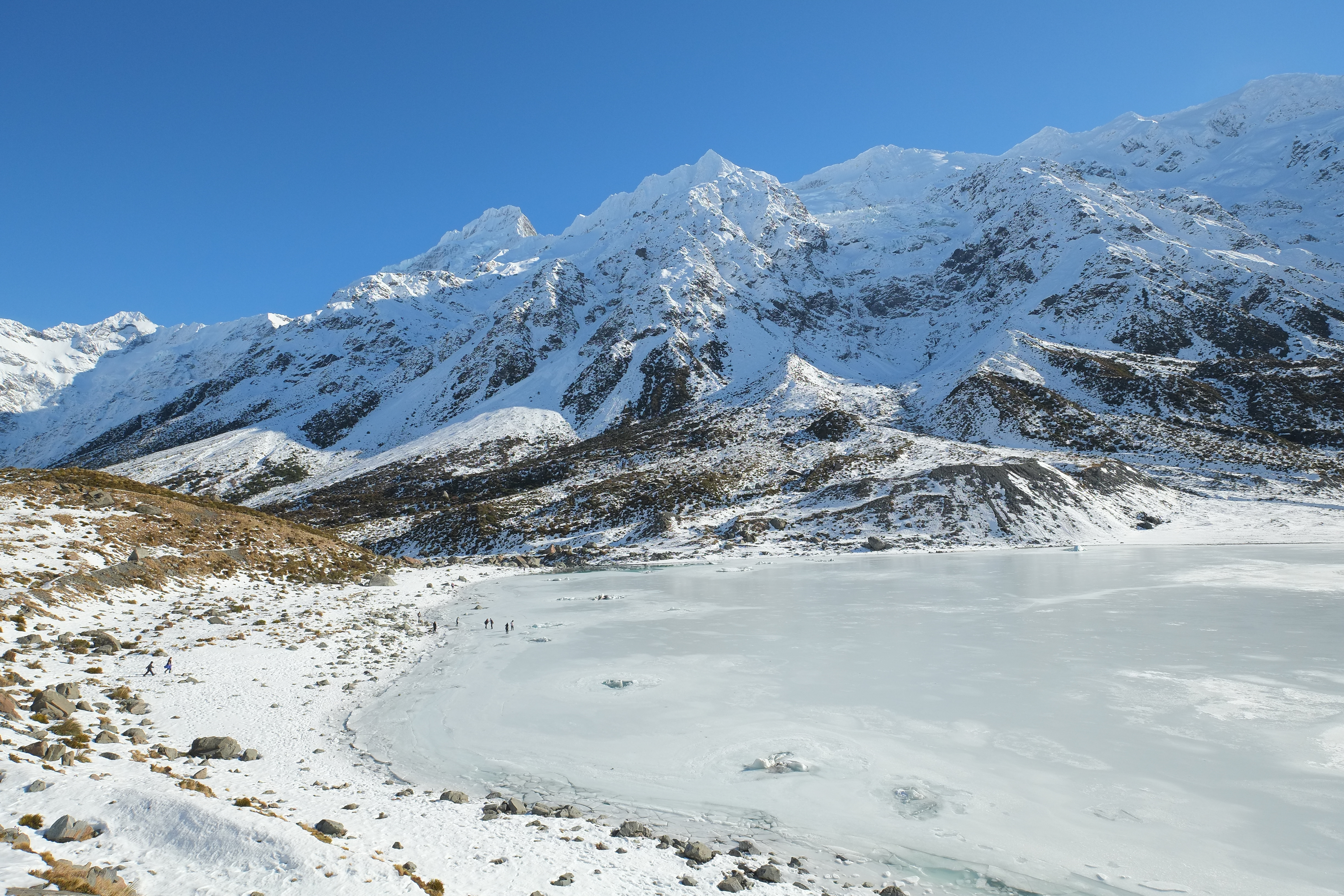
Shore of the frozen Hooker Lake in winter

At the end of the most recent ice age around 13,000 years ago, numerous glaciers were tributaries of a much larger glacier covering all of Hooker Tasman Valleys in hundreds of metres of ice. This glacier was about 85 km (53 mi) long and reached beyond the southern end of today's Lake Pukaki, up to 40 km (25 mi) south of Aoraki / Mount Cook National Park. As the glacier retreated, it filled the hollowed-out valleys with rocks and gravel, leaving behind the flat-bottomed U-shaped valleys seen today. Moraines left behind by the glacier's retreat can be seen in the valleys.

Glaciers cover 40% of the park area, notably the Tasman Glacier in the Tasman Valley east of Aoraki / Mount Cook which is the largest glacier in New Zealand. A majority of glaciers in New Zealand lie within Aoraki / Mount Cook National Park, such as the Tasman Glacier, Hooker Glacier, Murchison Glacier and Mueller Glacier, while further north in the park lie the Godley Glacier, Classen Glacier, Grey Glacier and Maud Glacier. All of these glaciers terminate at proglacial lakes formed in recent decades due to a sustained period of shrinking. Tasman Lake and Hooker Lake are easily accessible via walking tracks and are the only two of these lakes that have official names. Tasman Lake is the largest of the proglacial lakes. Taking a boat tour among the icebergs on the Tasman Lake is a popular tourist activity.

=== Climate ===
Temperatures in Mount Cook Village range between extremes of −13 °C (9 °F) to 32 °C (90 °F), and typically fall just over 1 °C (34 °F) for every 200 metres (660 ft) of additional altitude.

Rainfall is similarly variable, with the driest months receiving around 300 mm (12 in) precipitation, but recorded maxima are 537 mm (21.1 in) in one day and 1,447 mm (57.0 in) in a single month. Snow falls on about 21 days per year.

During the coldest months of the year, Mueller Glacier Lake, Hooker Lake, and Tasman Lake usually freeze over, at least partially. The weather conditions in the park, in particular at higher altitudes, can be unpredictable and change rapidly.

Climate data for Mount Cook Village, New Zealand (2001–2020)
Month	Jan	Feb	Mar	Apr	May	Jun	Jul	Aug	Sep	Oct	Nov	Dec	Year
Mean daily maximum °C (°F)	20.4 (68.7)	20.8 (69.4)	18.4 (65.1)	14.9 (58.8)	11.0 (51.8)	7.9 (46.2)	7.2 (45.0)	9.1 (48.4)	11.8 (53.2)	14 (57)	16.3 (61.3)	18.5 (65.3)	14.2 (57.6)
Daily mean °C (°F)	14.6 (58.3)	14.7 (58.5)	12.4 (54.3)	9.4 (48.9)	6.2 (43.2)	3.2 (37.8)	2.5 (36.5)	4.1 (39.4)	6.6 (43.9)	8.6 (47.5)	10.6 (51.1)	12.8 (55.0)	8.8 (47.8)
Mean daily minimum °C (°F)	8.7 (47.7)	8.5 (47.3)	6.5 (43.7)	4.0 (39.2)	1.3 (34.3)	−1.4 (29.5)	−2.2 (28.0)	−0.8 (30.6)	1.5 (34.7)	3.1 (37.6)	5.0 (41.0)	7.0 (44.6)	3.4 (38.1)
Average precipitation mm (inches)	418.7 (16.48)	272.0 (10.71)	315.0 (12.40)	366.5 (14.43)	377.8 (14.87)	291.0 (11.46)	288.6 (11.36)	283.8 (11.17)	361.0 (14.21)	394.4 (15.53)	367.6 (14.47)	425.9 (16.77)	4,132.3 (162.69)
Average precipitation days (≥ 1.0 mm)	11.3	9.0	10.0	11.4	15.3	14.1	13.4	13.5	14.8	15.8	13.8	13.7	155.4
Average relative humidity (%)	64.7	69.8	73.7	76.3	81.7	82.0	79.2	79.4	67.3	66.4	64.3	67.0	72.8
Mean monthly sunshine hours	184.3	171.2	157.2	127.3	83.1	76.5	82.9	112.0	122.4	152.5	167.4	176.9	1,613.6
Source: NIWA Climate Database

== Geology ==
The Southern Alps lie along a geological plate boundary, with the Pacific Plate to the southeast pushing westward and colliding with the northward-moving Indo-Australian Plate to the northwest. Aoraki / Mount Cook lies in the centre of the Alpine Fault, a 600 km (370 mi) long active fault formed by the plate boundary, which has ruptured four times in the last 900 years. Over the last 45 million years, the collision of the two tectonic plates has pushed up a 25 km thickness of rocks on the Pacific Plate to form the Southern Alps. Extreme temperatures and high precipitation work to shatter surface rock, leading to erosion down the steep slopes. In December 1991, an avalanche of 10 million cubic metres of snow and rock caused 10 metres to be lost off the top of Aoraki / Mount Cook. Two decades of erosion of the ice cap exposed after this collapse reduced the height by another 30 m to 3,724 m, as revealed by GPS data from a University of Otago climbing expedition in November 2013.

There are two main rock types in the Southern Alps: sedimentary sandstones and metamorphic schists. The sandstones are greywacke and argillite, mostly to the east of the Main Divide, whereas the schists are mostly to the west of the Main Divide. Rock along the Alpine Fault has been warped and folded into complex layers with much shearing and fracturing. Very few fossils have been found in the rocks of the national park. Parts of the Malte Brun range can be dated to the Permian Period by fossils found there in red argillite.

== Ecology ==
=== Flora ===
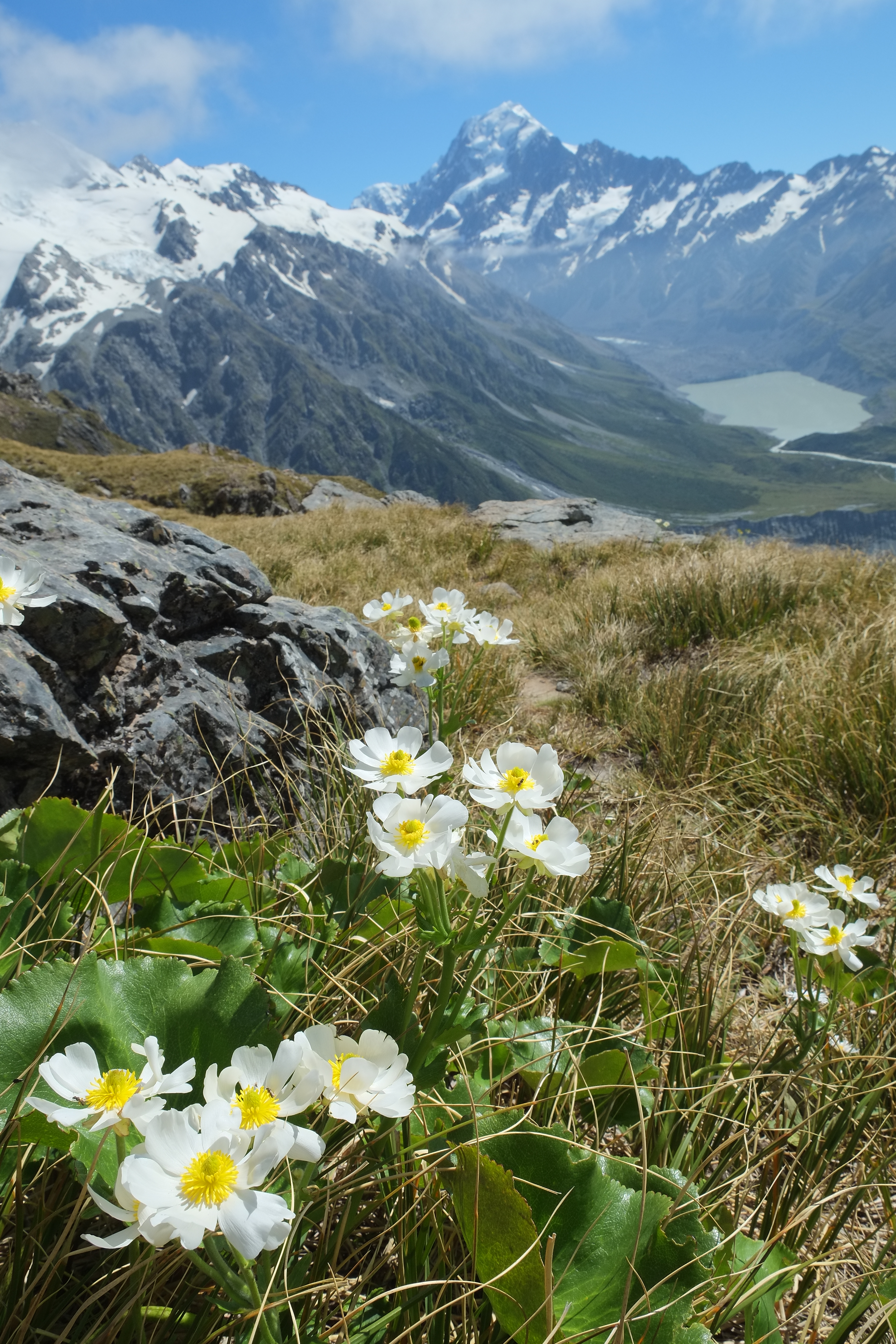
Mount Cook lilies with Lake Hooker in the background

More than 400 species of plants are found in Aoraki / Mount Cook National Park, including more than 100 introduced plant species such as the colourful Russell lupin, wild cherry, snowberries, and wilding pines. Most parts of the national park are either at higher altitude or in the proglacial valleys such as the Hooker Valley and Tasman Valley, where the soil of the valley floors and moraine walls do not support forest growth. As a result, the only pockets of forest and native bush, such as silver beech and tōtara trees, can be found in the park are along the southern edge of the Hooker Valley and the lower slopes of Sealy Range.

The plant life in the majority of the park consists mostly of alpine plants. Between 1,300 and 1,900 metres (4,300 and 6,200 ft) and in the valleys, the vegetation is predominantly snow tussock grassland, as well as golden speargrass, large mountain daisies (tikumu) (Celmisia semicordata, Celmisia coriacea), and Mount Cook lily, (Ranunculus lyallii), the largest buttercup in the world. All of these plants flower in the warmer months from November to February – early in the season in the valley floors, and later at higher altitudes. At the highest rocks of Aoraki / Mount Cook, around 14 species of lichen have been found.

The native vegetation continues to be under threat by introduced plant species ranging from non-native trees through to lupins, broom and non-native grasses. These are mostly contained in the valley floors of the Tasman and Hooker Valley, since they are the most accessible parts of the park.

Tutu, a poisonous plant, flourishes throughout the Hooker Valley during summer. Tutu is considered taonga by Ngāi Tahu.

=== Fauna ===
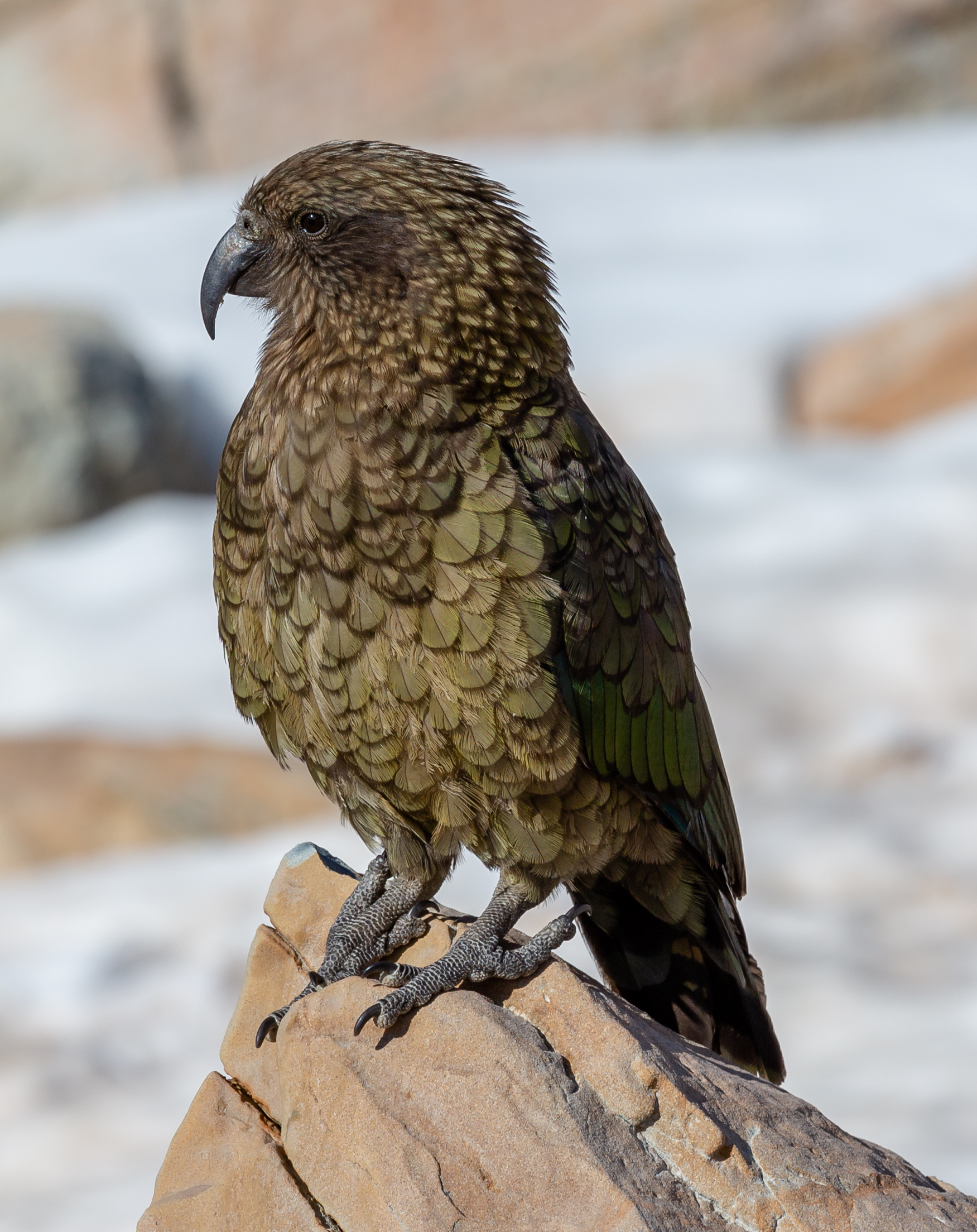
A kea near Mueller Hut

There are about 35 species of birds in the park including the kea, the only alpine parrot, Australasian Harrier (kāhu), silvereye (tauhou), a small omnivorous passerine bird, New Zealand falcon (kārearea), and the pipit (pīhoihoi). The tiny New Zealand rock wren (pīwauwau), a threatened species, is the only permanent alpine bird in New Zealand.

Small insectivores such as the rifleman (tītipounamu) and the fantail (pīwakawaka) live in the low forest and scrub, along with small numbers of two larger birds, the kererū and morepork (ruru). Introduced species such as finches and sparrows live throughout the bush near Mount Cook Village. The black stilt (kakī), the rarest wading bird in the world, primarily lives in the braided riverbed of the Tasman Valley. In 2019, young black stilts raised in a hatchery were released near the Cass River and Godley River. European explorer Julius von Haast reported seeing kākā and piopio in the national park in 1862, however the piopio later became extinct.

The park is home to many invertebrates, including large dragonflies, crickets, grasshoppers, 223 recorded moth species and 7 native butterflies. The black alpine wētā, also known as the Mount Cook flea, is found above the snowline. The jewelled gecko lives in the park but is rarely seen.

== Human interaction ==
=== Access ===
==== By land ====
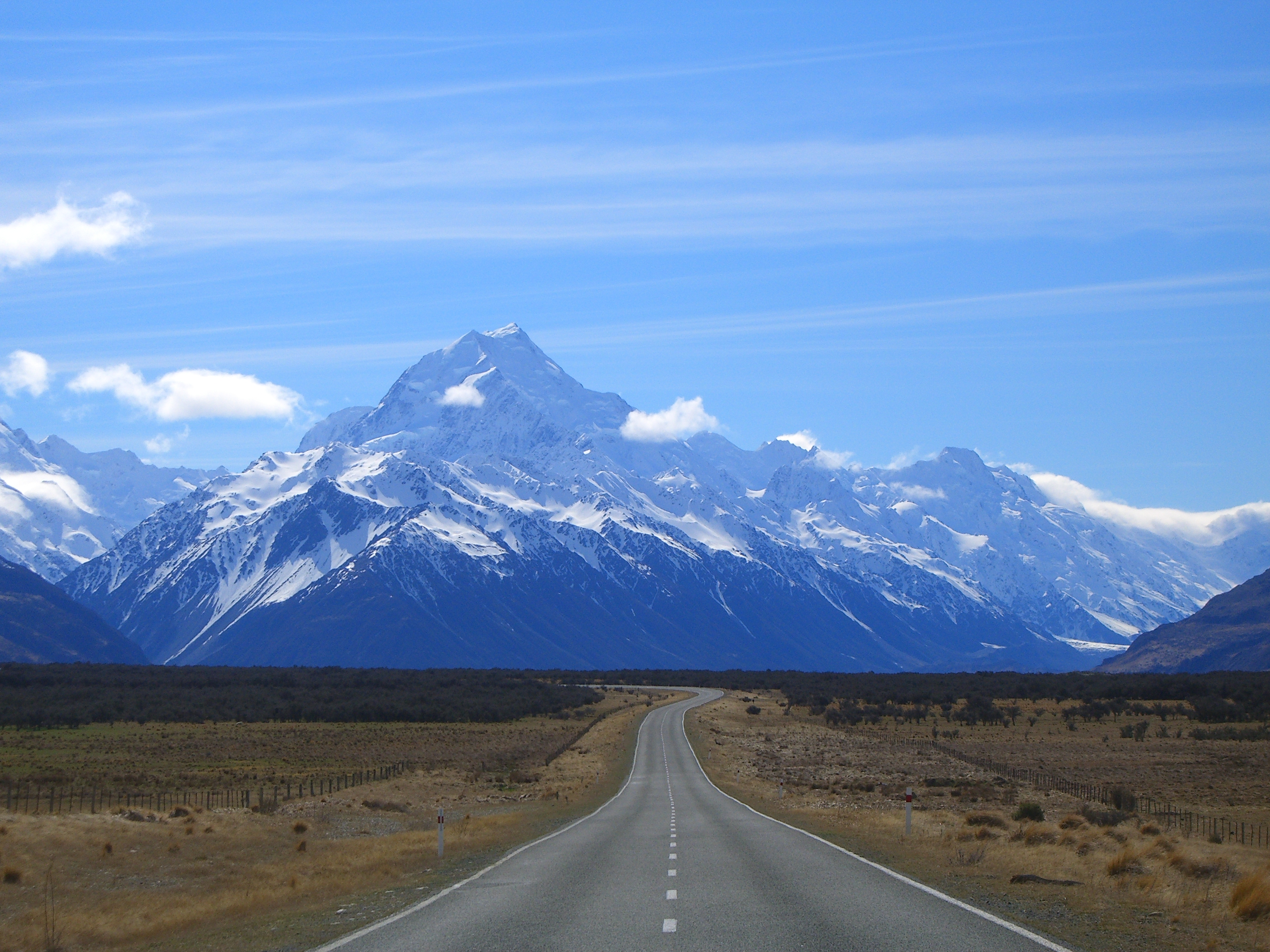
State Highway 80 leading towards Aoraki / Mount Cook

Access to the national park began as a rough track from Twizel along the western shore of Lake Pukaki to the Hermitage. The road, now known as State Highway 80, was improved over time. In the 1960s a major hydroelectric scheme was underway in the Mackenzie Basin. This required Lake Pukaki to be raised by 37 m (121 ft), which would submerge parts of the gravel road to the Hermitage, so a new sealed road was built and completed in 1975. The highway ends at Mount Cook Village, with a connecting road leading to the White Horse Hill camping ground. Another small road leads to a car park near Tasman Lake, the start of a short walking track and the Ball Hut Route. A pedestrian swing bridge was built over the Hooker River in the Hooker Valley in 1911, providing easier access to climbing routes.

Rodolph Wigley's Mount Cook Motor Co was formed in 1906 to provide passenger and mail services to the Hermitage from the railhead at Fairlie. The first coaches held between five and nine passengers and the journey from Fairlie to the Hermitage took around seven hours, not including a meal break. The service evolved into Mount Cook Landlines, which transported visitors to Mount Cook Village from Queenstown and Christchurch until 1989. In 1989, the new owner of Mount Cook Landlines, Tourism Holdings Limited, scrapped the coach services and the Mount Cook brand. In recent years, coach services to Mount Cook Village are run by InterCity and other smaller operators.

==== By air ====
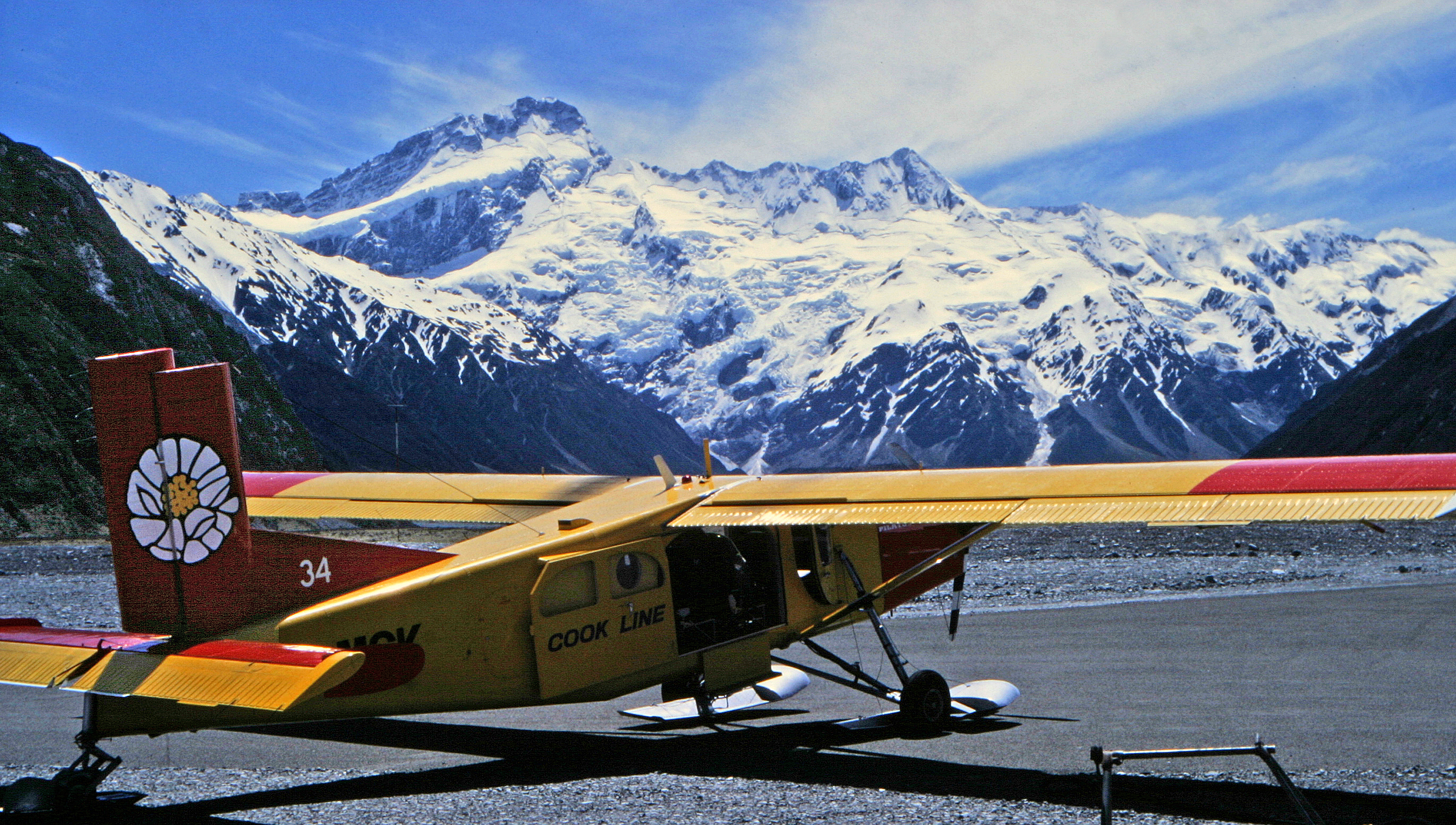
A ski plane at Mount Cook Aerodrome (2006). Mount Sefton and The Footstool in background.

In 1920, following his success running a bus service to Mount Cook Village, Rodolph Wigley raised the idea of providing flights from Timaru and Queenstown to Mount Cook. A test flight took place in May 1920, with a plane circling Aoraki / Mount Cook but not landing, but nothing came of the idea. The first landing in the Mount Cook area took place on 4 December 1934. Squadron-Leader T. W. White and a passenger flew a Spartan from Timaru, landing at Birch Hill Flat, 5 km (3.1 mi) southeast of Mount Cook Village. Wigley's Mount Cook Tourist Company then built a small airfield, Mount Cook Aerodrome, at Birch Hill Flat. The aerodrome opened on 3 May 1936. There is also another airfield, Glentanner Aerodrome, which is 20 km (12 mi) from Mount Cook Village. Mount Cook Airline began scheduled passenger flights to the area in 1961. In December 2019, Mount Cook Airline was merged into Air New Zealand and ceased operations.

The Mount Cook company developed retractable skis for small aircraft, providing direct access to snowfields for skiers and sightseers. The first ski plane flight using retractable skis took place in 1955. Mount Cook Ski-Planes and Helicopters is now an independently operated company, offering landings on the Tasman Glacier. Helicopters also provide access to the mountains for hunters and climbers. Ski touring is also possible on the Tasman Glacier, the descent from the top to the bottom is about 19 km (12 mi).

=== Settlement within the park ===
==== Mount Cook Village ====
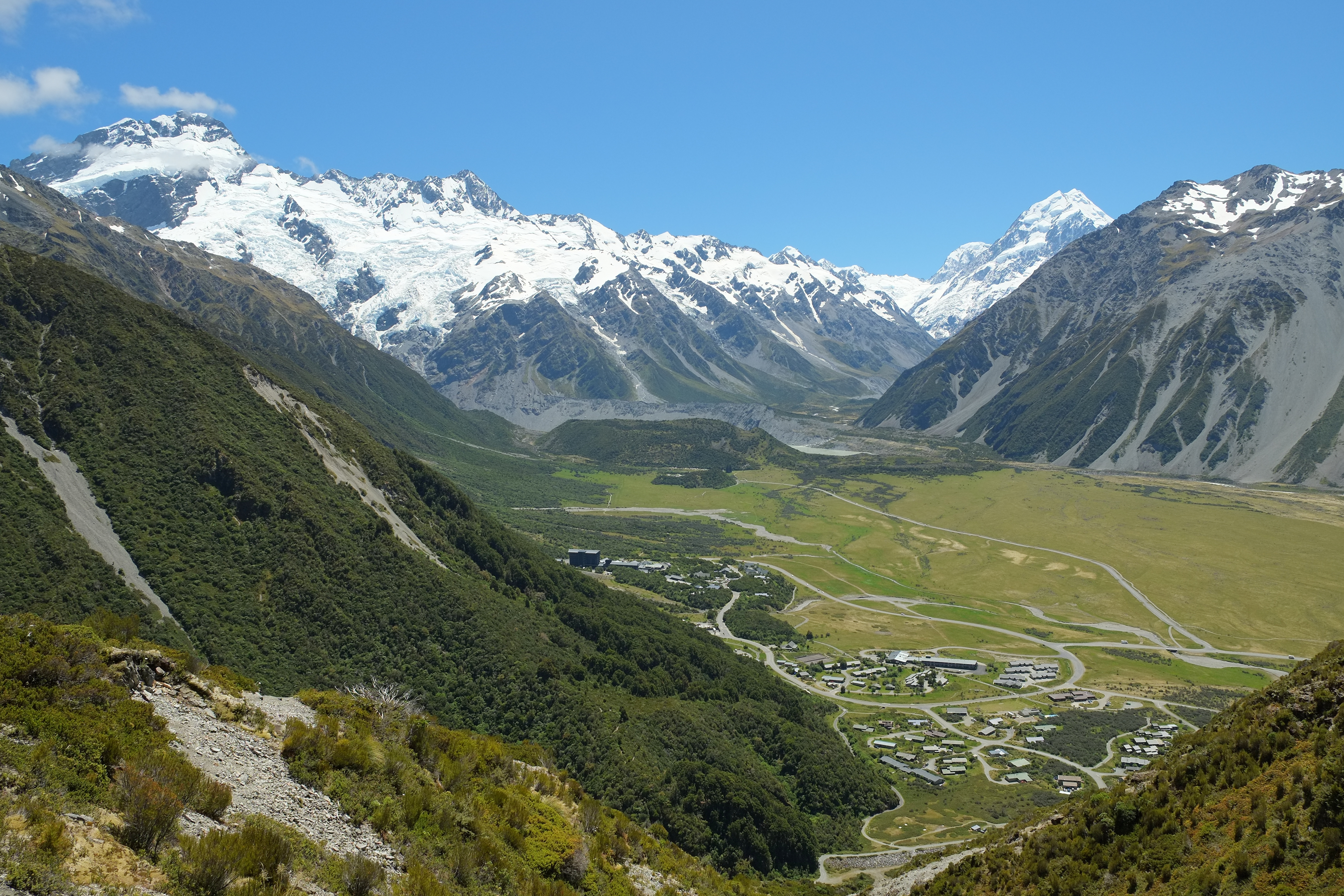
Mount Cook Village in front of Aroarokaehe Range, in summer

The village contains a small visitor centre, housing and amenities for the staff of the hotel and motels and other support personnel. The village has a small public primary school, opened in 1960, which is the only school in New Zealand situated inside a national park.

In 1884, Frank Huddleston opened accommodation he called "The Hermitage" at a site near the Mueller Glacier, to cater for climbing parties visiting the area. The hotel was later expanded, but was severely damaged by two floods in 1913.

The Hermitage was rebuilt on a more elevated site, opening in 1914, but that building was destroyed by fire in 1957. It was rebuilt quickly, opening in 1958, and since then has been altered and expanded several times as tourism increased.

=== Tourism ===
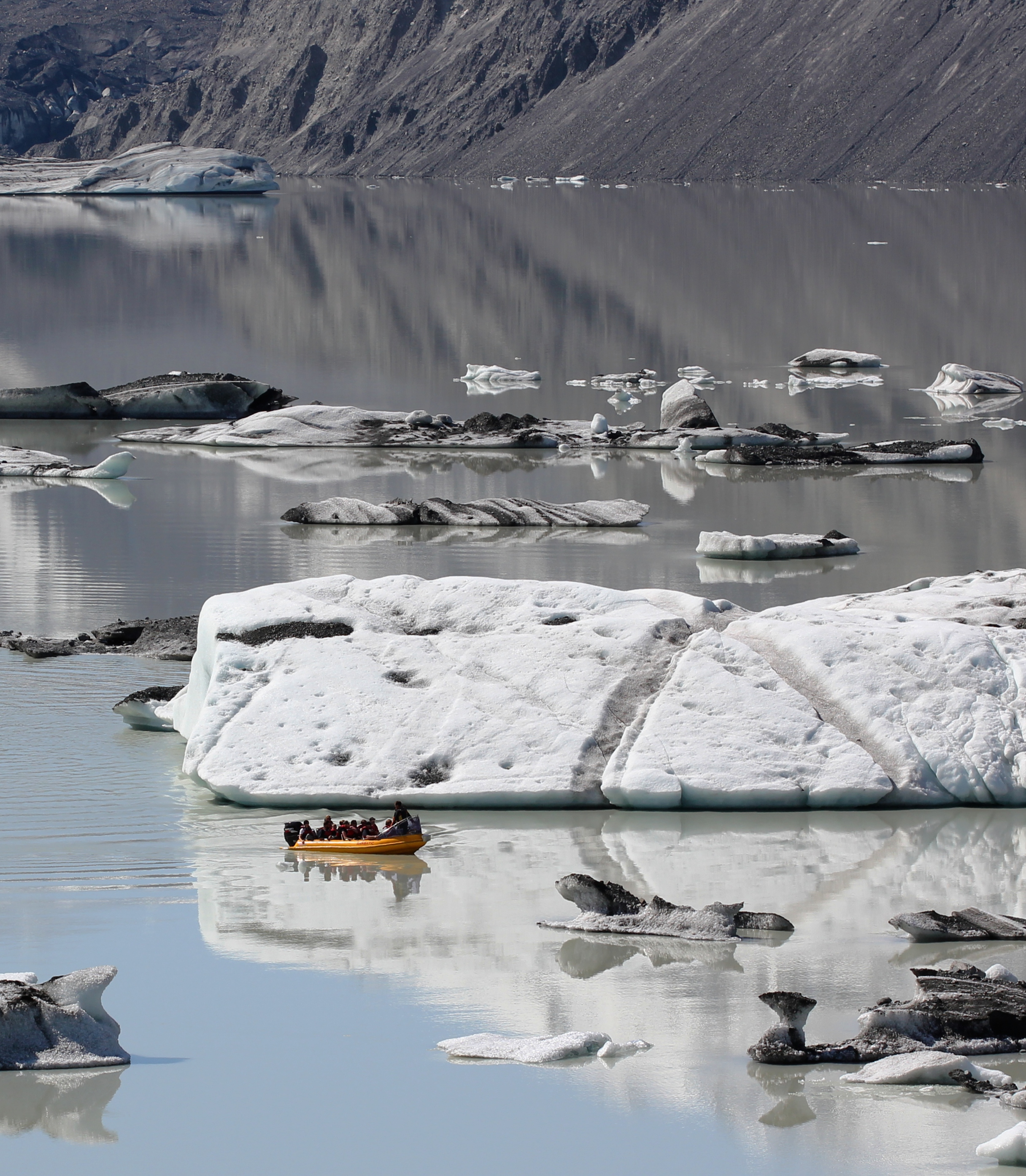
Tour boat among the icebergs on Tasman Lake

A visitor centre in the village features interpretation exhibits about the area's natural environment and history as well as an artwork collection. Aoraki / Mount Cook National Park attracted over one million tourists in 2019, a significant increase compared to the three hundred ninety-eight thousand people that visited in the 2016/2017 season. Tourism significantly decreased after the COVID-19 pandemic.

The park is a popular location for day hikes, sightseeing flights, heliskiing, hunting, kayaking, mountaineering, ski touring and tramping. The Department of Conservation, alongside Ngāi Tahu, administers all activities in the park, including the White Horse Hill camping ground. Recreational helicopter flights and sightseeing planes operate in the national park. Aoraki / Mount Cook National Park also attracts astrophotographers and stargazers due to low light pollution in the park.

Mount Cook Village is the start of several walking tracks, such as the popular Hooker Valley track which is 10 km (6.2 mi) long (return) and typically takes three hours to complete. About 1800–2000 people a day walk the Hooker Valley track in the peak season. Sealy Tarns is another popular track in the park. It is more challenging than the Hooker Valley track, and is nicknamed "The Stairway to Heaven" due to its steepness. Guided walking tours are offered on some other tracks, and boat trips and kayaking tours for tourists take place on the Tasman Lake at the end of the glacier. The park contains 15 huts, mostly in alpine terrain. The huts range from basic shelters to serviced huts, with the most accessible being Mueller Hut, which can be reached from Mount Cook Village within four hours. In February 2024, the Department of Conservation reported that 250 people per day were using the track to Mueller Hut, mostly as day-walkers. The large number of visitors led to the toilets at the hut nearing maximum capacity. The track was temporarily closed to day-walkers so that those with a hut booking could still access and use the hut.

Aoraki / Mount Cook National Park is the starting point of the Alps to Ocean Cycle Trail to Oamaru. The 300 km (190 mi) cycle trail was constructed from 2010 onwards by the New Zealand Cycle Trail project. As of 2016 the cycle trail still includes 15 km (9.3 mi) along public roads.

=== Mountaineering ===
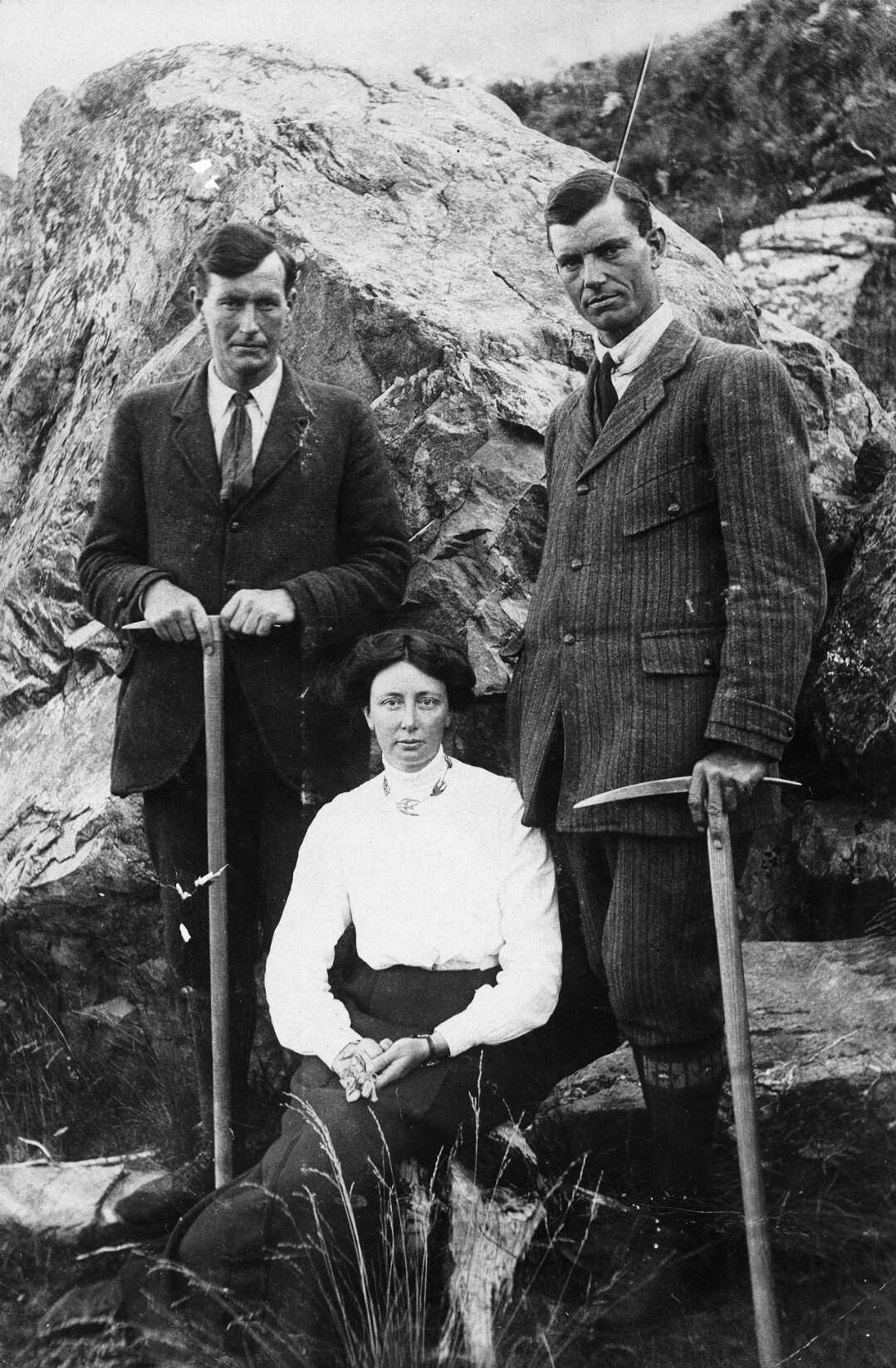
Freda Du Faur and her climbing party.

The peaks of the Aoraki / Mount Cook region have long attracted mountaineers. In 1882 Rev. William Spotswood Green made the first notable attempt to climb Aoraki / Mount Cook. Green travelled to New Zealand with two Swiss guides to make the climb, after seeing Sealy's photographs of the mountain at an exhibition in London. The three men got very close to the summit before being forced to turn back. At a dinner in his honour after the climb, Green noted that climbing would be easier if huts were built in the mountains, as the huts would provide shelter and a place to store provisions, lightening the load of climbers. He also suggested that New Zealand set up an Alpine Club, leading to establishment of the New Zealand Alpine Club in 1891.

After several attempts, the first successful ascent of Aoraki / Mount Cook was made on Christmas Day 1894, by Tom Fyfe, Jack Clarke, and George Graham.

In December 1910, Freda Du Faur became the first woman to climb Aoraki / Mount Cook, and in 1913 her climbing party made the first ascents of the Footstool and Mount Sefton. Mountaineering on the Aoraki / Mount Cook massif is a hazardous activity. In 1982, Mark Inglis and his climbing partner were trapped in a snow cave for two weeks.

Other mountaineering routes include crossing the Aroarokaehe Range via the Copland Pass, and the Mount Cook Range via the Ball Pass.

The area was the training ground for Sir Edmund Hillary. On the opposite side of the Hooker Valley, Mount Ollivier was Sir Edmund Hillary's first major climb in 1939. Since the establishment of a tramping track to Mueller Hut, not far below the summit, Ollivier is now one of the most accessible mountains in the park.

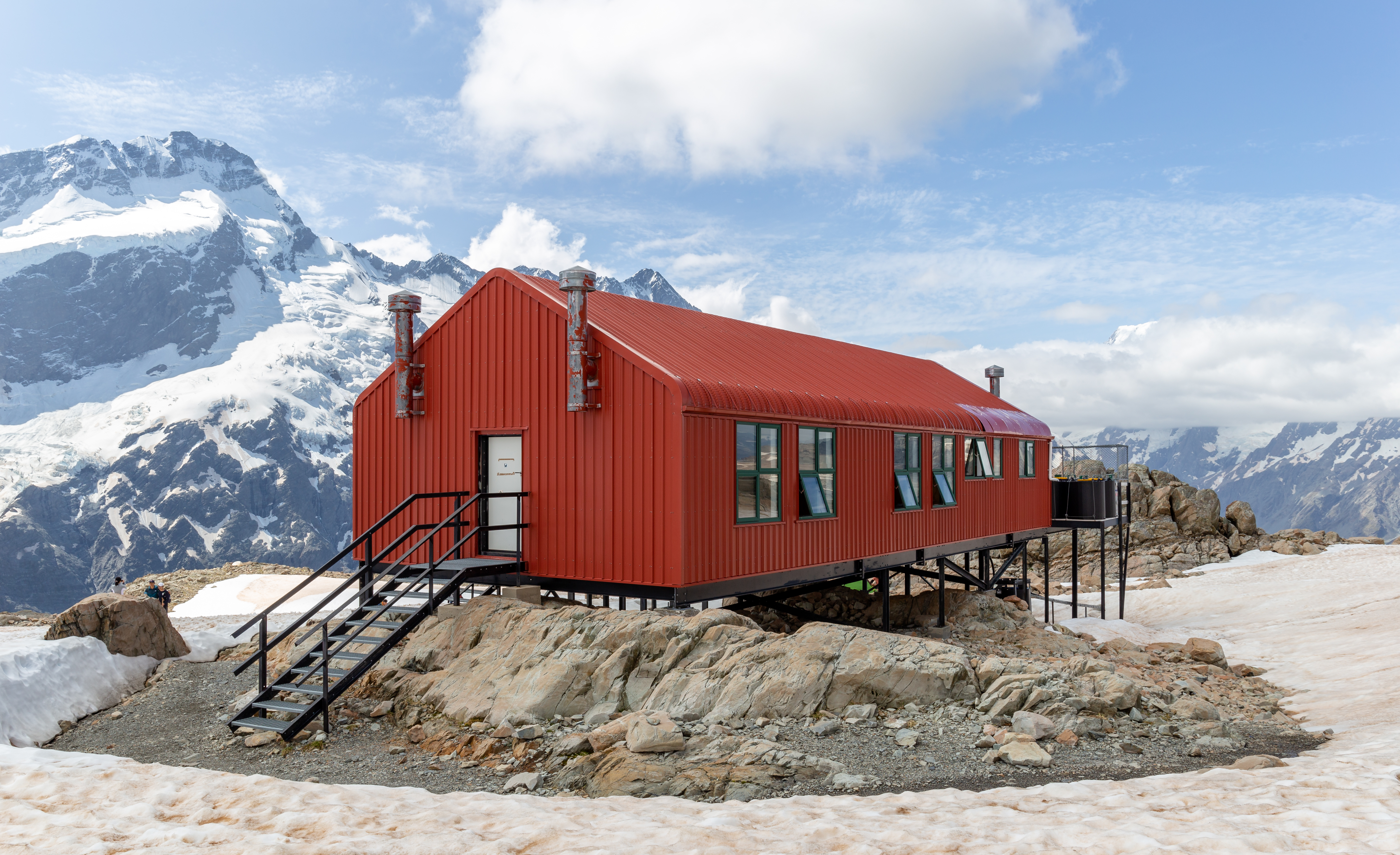
Mueller Hut, Sealy Range

Another mountain popular for mountaineers of intermediate skills is Sebastopol, the closest mountain to Mount Cook Village. At 1,468 m (4,816 ft) in height, it is only 750 m (2,460 ft) above Mount Cook Village, with the lower half of the ascent following the Red Tarns tramping track. Sebastopol offers one of a few view points taking in both the Hooker Valley and the Tasman Valley.

There are 15 mountain huts in Aoraki / Mount Cook National Park for the use of climbers and hunters. Twelve of these are managed by the Department of Conservation, two belong to the New Zealand Deerstalkers Association and one, Caroline Hut, is privately owned by an alpine guiding company. Another hut—Red Stag Hut—sits just outside the national park in the adjoining Te Kahui Kaupeka Conservation Park. Hooker Hut, built in 1910, is the oldest surviving hut in the national park. It has been moved three times as the Hooker Glacier receded, then was removed and restored before being reassembled in a new location in 2021. The oldest hut still in its original location is Sefton Bivouac, built in 1917.

=== International Dark Sky Reserve ===
In June 2012, an area of 4,367 km^{2} (1,686 sq mi) including Aoraki / Mount Cook National Park and the Mackenzie Basin was designated as the Aoraki Mackenzie International Dark Sky Reserve by the DarkSky International. At the time of the designation in 2012, the reserve was the largest in the world, and the only reserve of its type in the Southern Hemisphere. The night sky brightness in the reserve ranks at a level 2 on the nine-level Bortle scale.

== Management and conservation ==
=== Management plan ===
In 2018 the Department of Conservation drafted a management plan for the park to consider how land, water, flora and fauna, aircraft and visitors to Aoraki / Mount Cook National Park could be managed over the following 10 years. However, review of the plan stopped in February 2019 to consider the ramifications of a Supreme Court decision involving Ngāi Tai, an Auckland iwi, who argued that DOC should consider the Treaty of Waitangi when granting concessions for commercial activities on conservation land. The Supreme Court found that "decisions to grant concessions to third parties would need to include asking whether the concession opportunities should be preserved for the economic benefit of Ngāi Tai and whether there was any basis for the preferential grant of concessions to Ngāi Tai". DOC paused work on the management plan for Aoraki / Mount Cook National Park while it held discussions with Ngāi Tahu.

The formation of the draft management plan occurred at the same time as the number of visitors to Aoraki / Mount Cook Park was increasing dramatically. Visitor numbers doubled between 2016 and 2019, reaching more than one million visits to Mount Cook Village, the gateway to the park. Proposals to manage the huge number of tourists included a booking system, a park entrance fee, and a "park and ride" system to limit traffic in the village. A local Ngāi Tahu leader noted that Tourism New Zealand has been encouraging lots of people to come to the country without necessarily having the infrastructure in place". The Department of Conservation had concerns about management of increasing quantities of human waste and litter in the village and in alpine huts, suggesting that visitors might be encouraged to take their litter away when they leave the park.

=== Threats from introduced animals ===
A wide range of introduced animals are present in the park or in surrounding regions. These include stoats, red deer, possums, tahr and chamois. Many of these animals pose significant threats to the flora and fauna of the park.

==== Tahr ====
In 1904, the Duke of Bedford gave five Himalayan tahr to the New Zealand Tourist Department. The South Canterbury Acclimatisation Society released the animals at Governor's Bush in Aoraki / Mount Cook National Park in December 1904. In 1909, another eight tahr were released in the same area, and the population increased. Tahr cause damage to alpine plants, leading to soil erosion, and from 1937 the government has attempted to control the spread and numbers of tahr. The Department of Conservation encourages hunting of tahr in Aoraki / Mount Cook National Park.

==== Chamois ====
In 1907, the Emperor of Austria presented the New Zealand government with a herd of eight chamois. The animals were released in the Hooker valley near the Hermitage Hotel as protected game animals, and within a few years they had begun breeding and spreading along the length of the Southern Alps. By the 1930s chamois were acknowledged to be causing damage to the alpine environment, by eating native plants and by trampling vegetation and compacting the soil. Protection was removed and control measures were created. Today chamois can be hunted year-round in Aoraki / Mount Cook National Park.

=== Lead toxicity to kea ===
Research on lead toxicity in kea living at Aoraki / Mount Cook in the 1990s found that of 38 live kea tested, all were found to have detectable blood lead levels, 26 considered dangerously high. Additional analysis of 15 dead kea sent to Massey University for diagnostic pathology between 1991 and 1997 found nine bodies to have lead blood levels consistent with causing death. After further testing in the 2000s found lead in kea, the Department of Conservation attempted to remove all sources of lead such as flashings and nail heads from buildings in Mount Cook Village. The Kea Conservation Trust has continued this work with funding from DOC.

=== Other threats ===
After extensive filming took place in national parks including Aoraki / Mount Cook for the Lord of the Rings trilogy, concerns about the possible effects of such activities on the environment were raised at a workshop in 2002.

== In popular culture ==
Aoraki / Mount Cook National Park has been used as a filming location for numerous films, including Mulan (2020), Vertical Limit (2000), The Lord of the Rings film series (2001–2003), The Chronicles of Narnia film series (2005–2010), and A Wrinkle in Time (2018). Minas Tirith, the capital of Gondor in the fantasy adventure film series The Lord of the Rings, was filmed approximately 3 km (1.9 mi) away from Mount Cook Village.

First Crossings, a reality show retracing early exploration in New Zealand, had two episodes relating to Aoraki / Mount Cook National Park: "Fyfe and Graham", about the first ascent of Mount de la Beche in 1894, and "Miracle in the Southern Alps", about a 1948 rescue on La Perouse.

== See also ==
- Forest parks of New Zealand
- List of mountains of New Zealand by height
- National parks of New Zealand
- Protected areas of New Zealand
