= Sealy Tarns =

Coordinates: 43.7132°S 170.0740°E

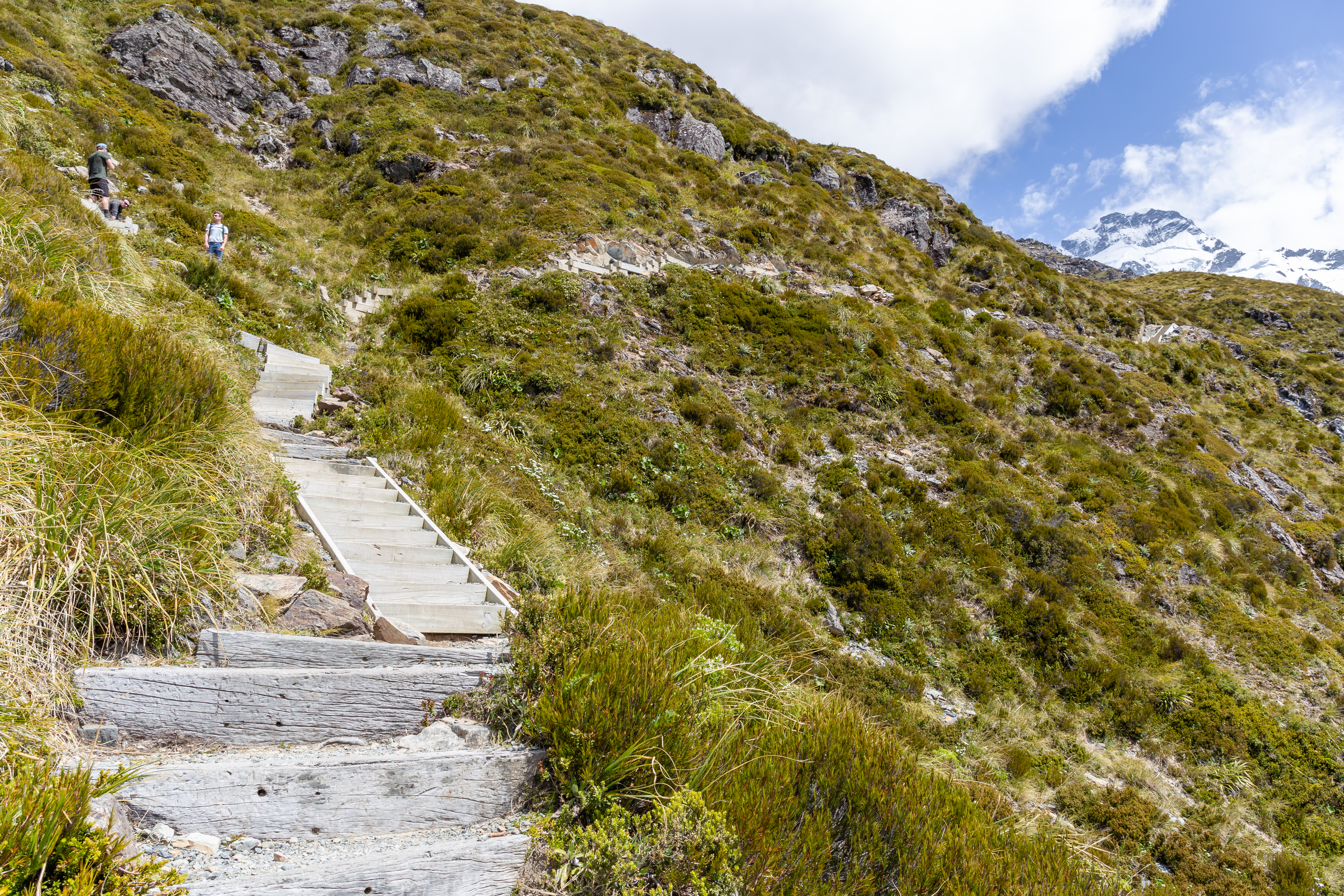
- Sealy Tarns Track
- Interactive map of Sealy Tarns
- Location: Sealy Range, New Zealand
- Type: Glacial tarns
- Basin countries: New Zealand

Sealy Tarns is a small flat area with two small tarns halfway up the northern slopes of the Sealy Range, New Zealand. It is accessible from the Hooker Valley and Mount Cook Village via a tramping track maintained by the Department of Conservation (DOC). The track climbs steeply from about 850 m (2,789 ft) to 1,300 m (4,265 ft) via many switchbacks and over 2,200 steps built of large timber anchored into the ground. The track was established during the 1980s, and upgraded in 2012. The distance for a return trek from Hooker Valley Road to Sealy Tarns is 5.8 km (3.6 miles).

The Sealy Tarns area marks the end of the well-maintained track, with a popular tramping route that continues to climb to Mueller Hut. The area features two small tarns (hence its name), an area suitable for tobogganing on the side of the ridge, and an excellent view of The Footstool, Aoraki / Mount Cook, both Hooker and Mueller Glaciers and their respective proglacial lakes, and Mount Cook Village.

== Panoramic overview ==
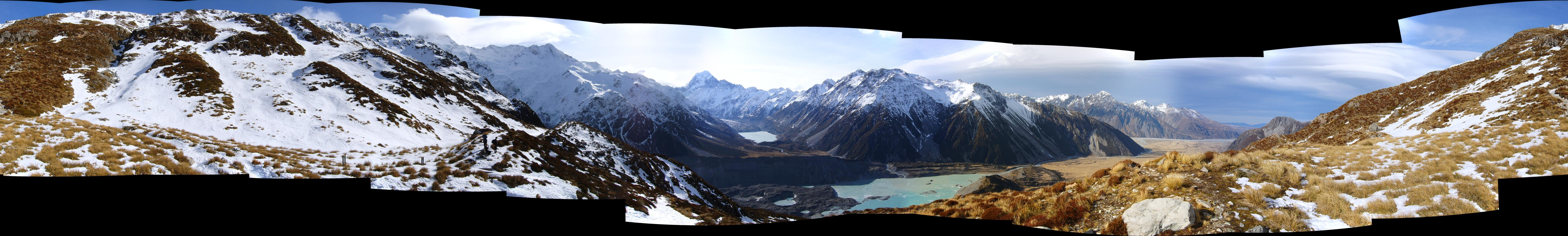
Panorama taken at the lower track entrance to Sealy Tarns

This stitched panorama was taken in the Winter of 2007 in the afternoon. From left-to-right the notable features are:

- The route further up the ridge to Mueller Hut
- A snow-covered area with toboggan tracks
- Two DOC signs indicating the tarns area with the tarns themselves snow-covered in the background
- The Footstool
- In center of frame, top-to-bottom:
  - Aoraki / Mount Cook
  - Terminal face and glacial lake of Hooker Glacier
  - Terminal face and glacial lake of the Mueller Glacier (compare to a photo from 2016 to see the retreat of the glacier)
- The wide flat-bottomed Hooker Valley (the village itself is hidden behind the ridge on the right)
