= Mount Sefton =

Mountain in New Zealand

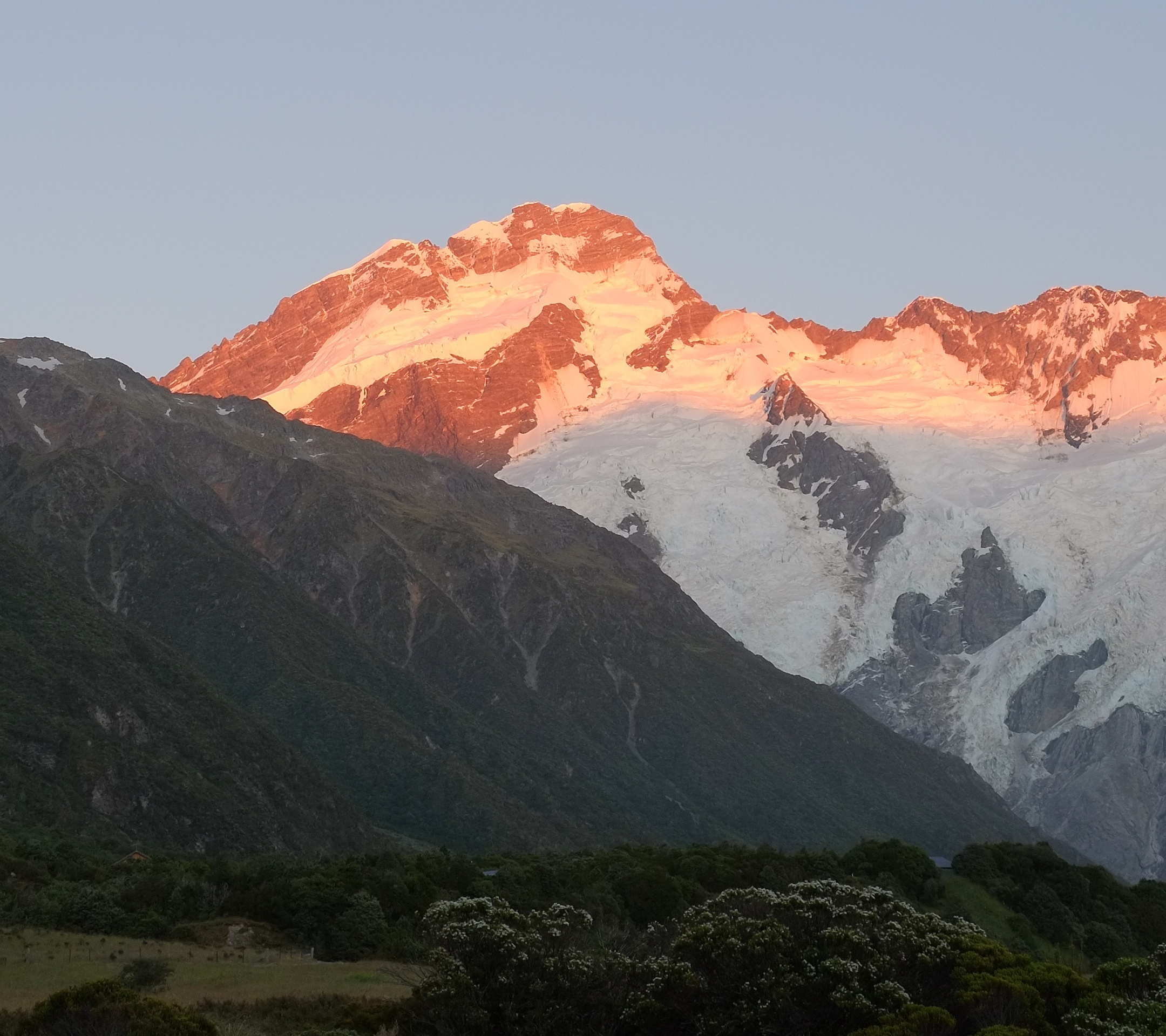
- Mount Sefton at sunrise, from Mount Cook Village

Highest point
- Elevation: 3,151 m (10,338 ft)
- Prominence: 1,063 m (3,488 ft)
- Listing: List of mountains of New Zealand by height
- Coordinates: 43°40′56″S 170°2′32″E

Naming
- Native name: Maukatua (Māori)

Geography
- Location within New Zealand
- Location: South Island, New Zealand
- Parent range: Southern Alps

Climbing
- First ascent: 1894 by Edward FitzGerald

Mount Sefton (Māori: Maukatua) is a mountain in the Aroarokaehe Range of the Southern Alps of New Zealand, just 12 kilometres (7.5 mi) south of Aoraki / Mount Cook. To the south lies Mount Brunner, and to the north The Footstool, both more than 400 metres (1,300 ft) shorter.

The mountain is prominently visible from Mount Cook Village in the Hooker Valley, with Tuckett Glacier flowing down the south-eastern side of the mountain and Mueller Glacier in the valley below it. With a height of 3,151 metres (10,338 ft), Mount Sefton is the 13th-highest peak in the Southern Alps, and the 4th-highest mountain in New Zealand when excluding peaks of little prominence that are closer than a kilometre to a higher peak.

The Douglas River (formerly known as the Twain River) begins on Mount Sefton.

An early resident, Charles French Pemberton, named the area, whilst the geologist Julius von Haast named the mountain after William Sefton Moorhouse, the second Superintendent of Canterbury Province. The Māori name of the mountain is Maukatua, which translates as 'mountain of the gods'.

Edward FitzGerald, with Matthias Zurbriggen as his guide, completed the first recorded climb to the summit shortly after Christmas 1894.

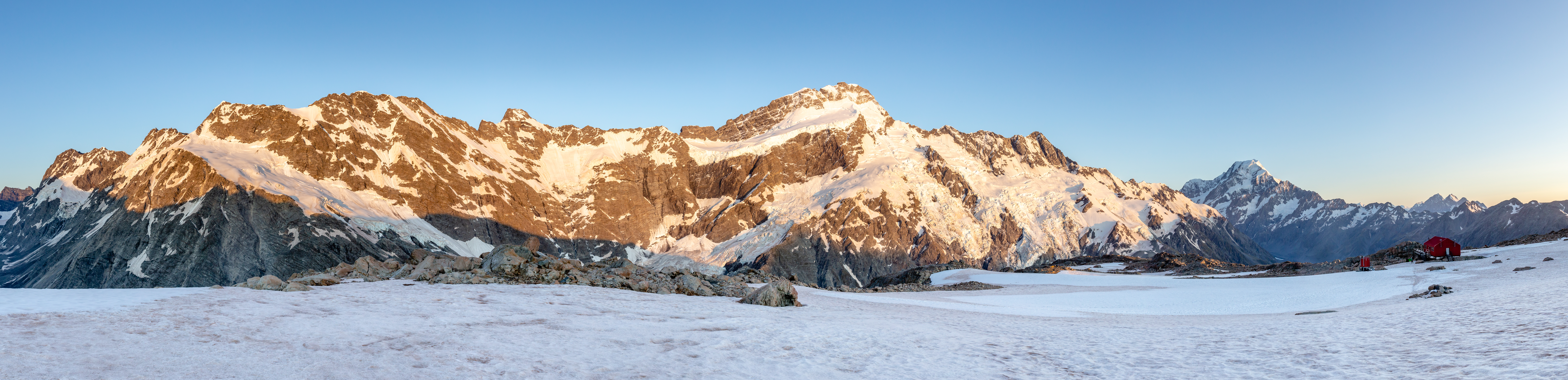
Mueller Hut with Mt Sefton (in the middle) and Aoraki / Mt Cook (on the right) during the sunrise
