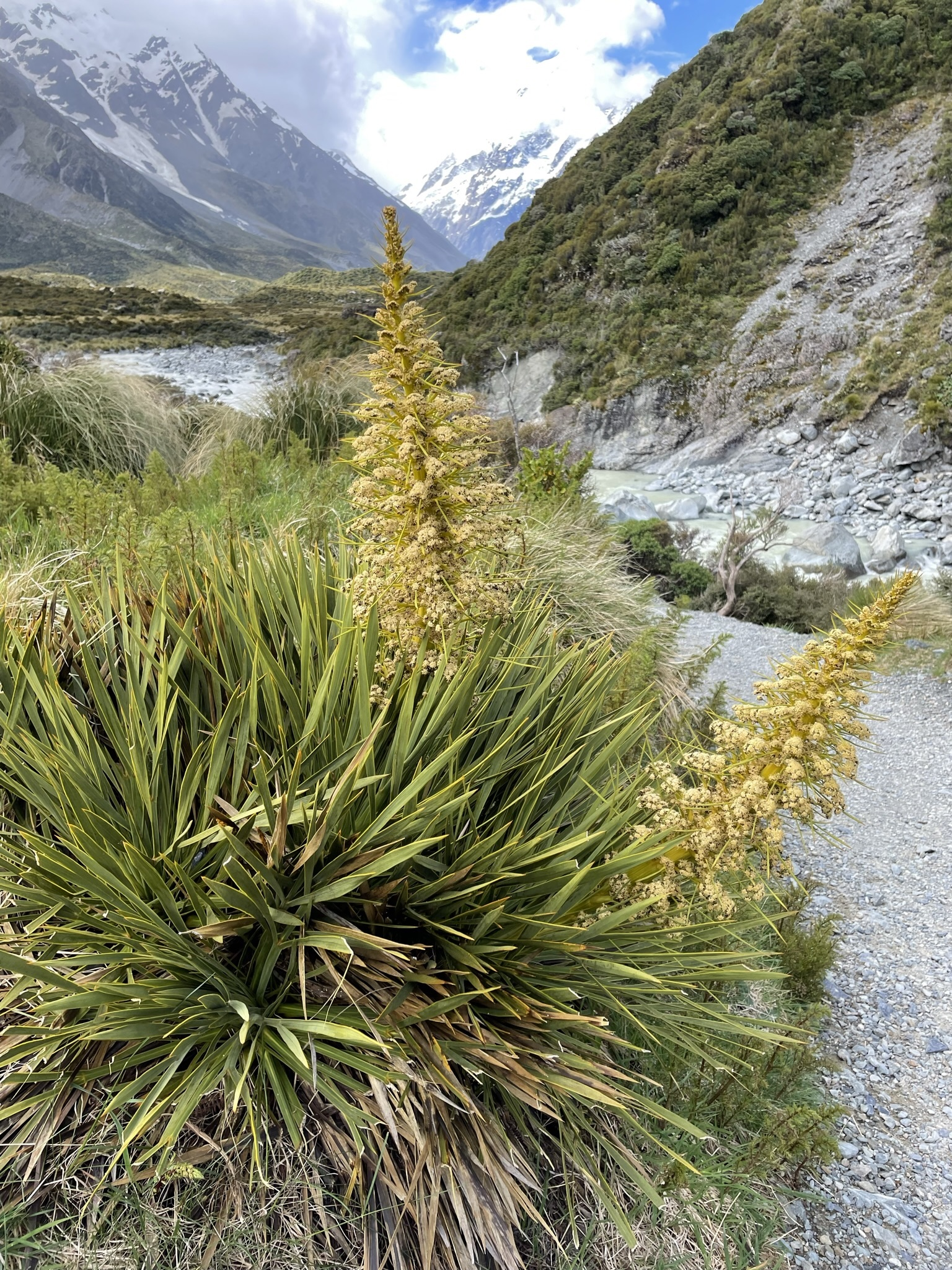
- A. aurea in Aoraki / Mount Cook National Park

Scientific classification
- Kingdom: Plantae
- Clade: Embryophytes
- Clade: Tracheophytes
- Clade: Spermatophytes
- Clade: Angiosperms
- Clade: Eudicots
- Clade: Asterids
- Order: Apiales
- Family: Apiaceae
- Genus: Aciphylla
- Species: A. aurea

Binomial name
- Aciphylla aurea W.R.B.Oliv.

= Aciphylla aurea =

Species of flowering plant

Aciphylla aurea, known as taramea in Māori and golden speargrass or golden Spaniard in New Zealand English, is a large, spiky, tufted plant with sharp yellowish-green leaves in the speargrass genus Aciphylla. A. aurea is found throughout the South Island of New Zealand in montane to low alpine habitats.

== Taxonomy and etymology ==
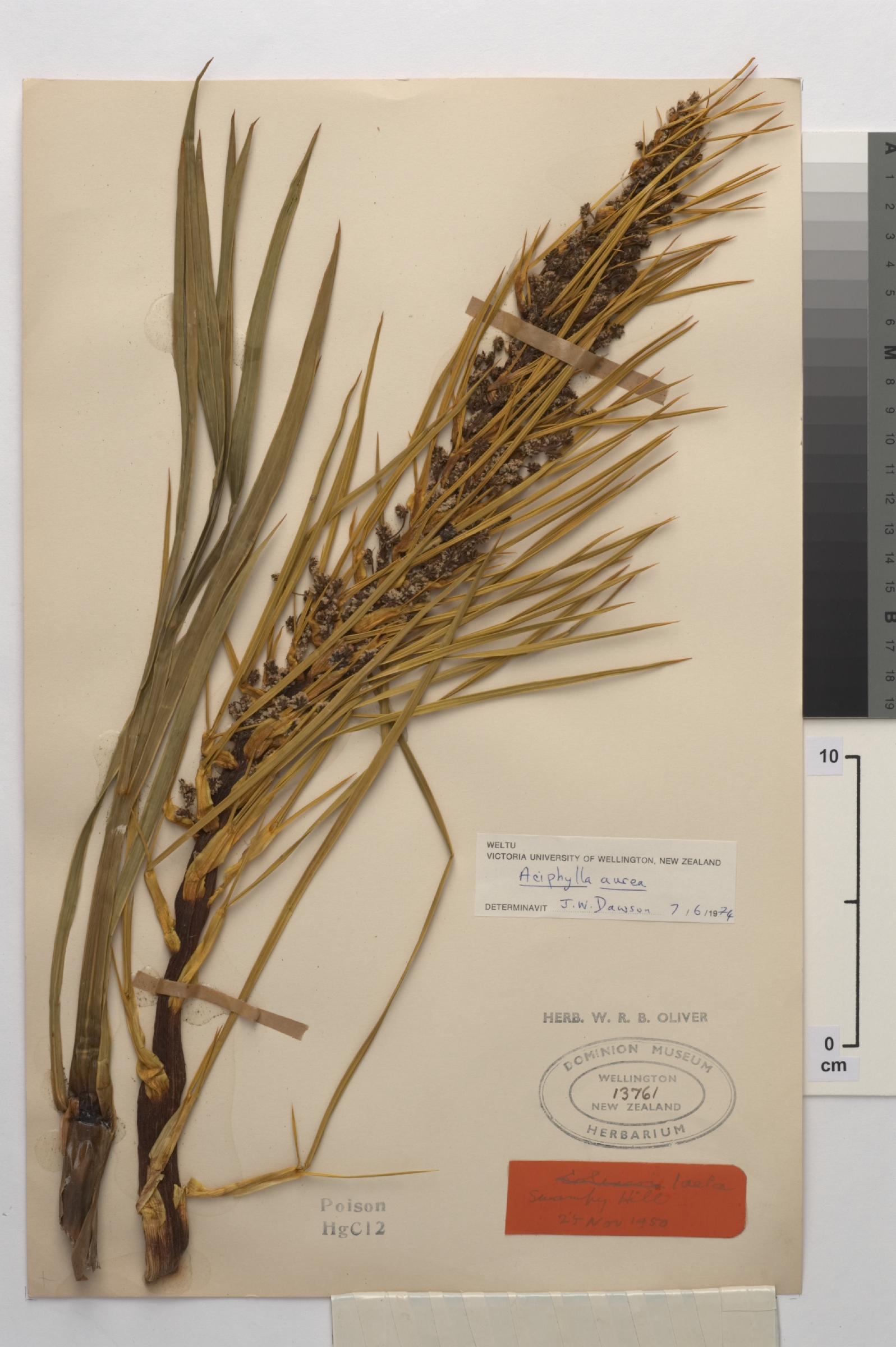
Possible isotype specimen of A. aurea from Te Papa. WELT SP013761.

This species was first described in 1956 by the New Zealand botanist Walter Oliver. The type locality of this species is Swampy Hill in Otago and the several syntype specimens, collected by Oliver on 25 November 1950, are held at Te Papa. The species epithet aurea refers to the distinctive golden colour of the plant.

== Description ==
Plants are yellow-green, tufted herbs up to 1.5 m high (when in flower or fruit) with spiky rosettes up to 1 m diameter, and dioecious (with separate male and female plants). Leaves are up to 70 cm long, once- or twice-pinnately compound, petiolate, with thick, wide sheaths and stiff, sharp, tapering stipules up to 27 cm long. Petioles are up to 20 cm long and 16 mm wide and serrulate. Pinnae in 1–2 pairs, about 20 cm long, erect, serrulate. Stems are thick, ribbed, bracted, and tapering, up to 80 cm long with acicular stipules up to 8 cm long. Flowers are cream to yellow in colour, and grouped into compound inflorescences called umbels that have linear bracts. In male plants, the umbels are found along the length of the peduncles, which are longer than the umbel rays. In female plants, the umbels are on peduncles up to 15 cm long and are made up of umbellules on short rays. Seeds usually dark brown (sometimes golden brown), 5–7 mm long.

Flowering from November–December. Flowering is irregular and infrequent (every 3–4 years).

Fruiting from January–February. Seeds are wind-dispersed.

Populations of A. aurea in the northern South Island (Marlborough and Nelson regions) show some characteristics that are different from the rest of the population, including golden brown seeds (rather than dark brown).

== Distribution and habitat ==
A. aurea is endemic to the South Island of New Zealand, from Nelson and Marlborough near Mount Stokes to northern Southland near Te Anau, mostly on the eastern side of the Southern Alps. It prefers montane to low alpine dry, rocky sites including grassland from 300–1,500 m above sea level. A. aurea can be common in the drier mountains of Marlborough.

A. aurea has a high tolerance for extreme weather conditions, tolerating fires and temperatures of -17 degrees Celsius. A. aurea is found in drier climates compared to some of its relatives, which might be due to plant size and tolerance.

== Conservation ==
Moa were once the main browser of this species: although the adult leaves have long spines to deter browsing by birds, young leaves are soft and flexible. These young leaves are also vulnerable to browsing by rabbits and hares. In experimental plots that has been fenced for 30 years to exclude these lagomorphs, young Aciphylla aurea plants were 15 times as abundant as in nearby plots where only cattle and sheep were excluded; adult plants were 7 times as abundant.

== Uses ==
Aciphylla aurea is one of several large species of Aciphylla with a milky exudate that was harvested and used by Māori to make perfume. The phytochemistry of A. aurea has been found to include the non-volatile polyacetylene falcarindiol and the seeds contained steam-distilled volatiles such as heptanal and octanoic acid.

== Gallery ==
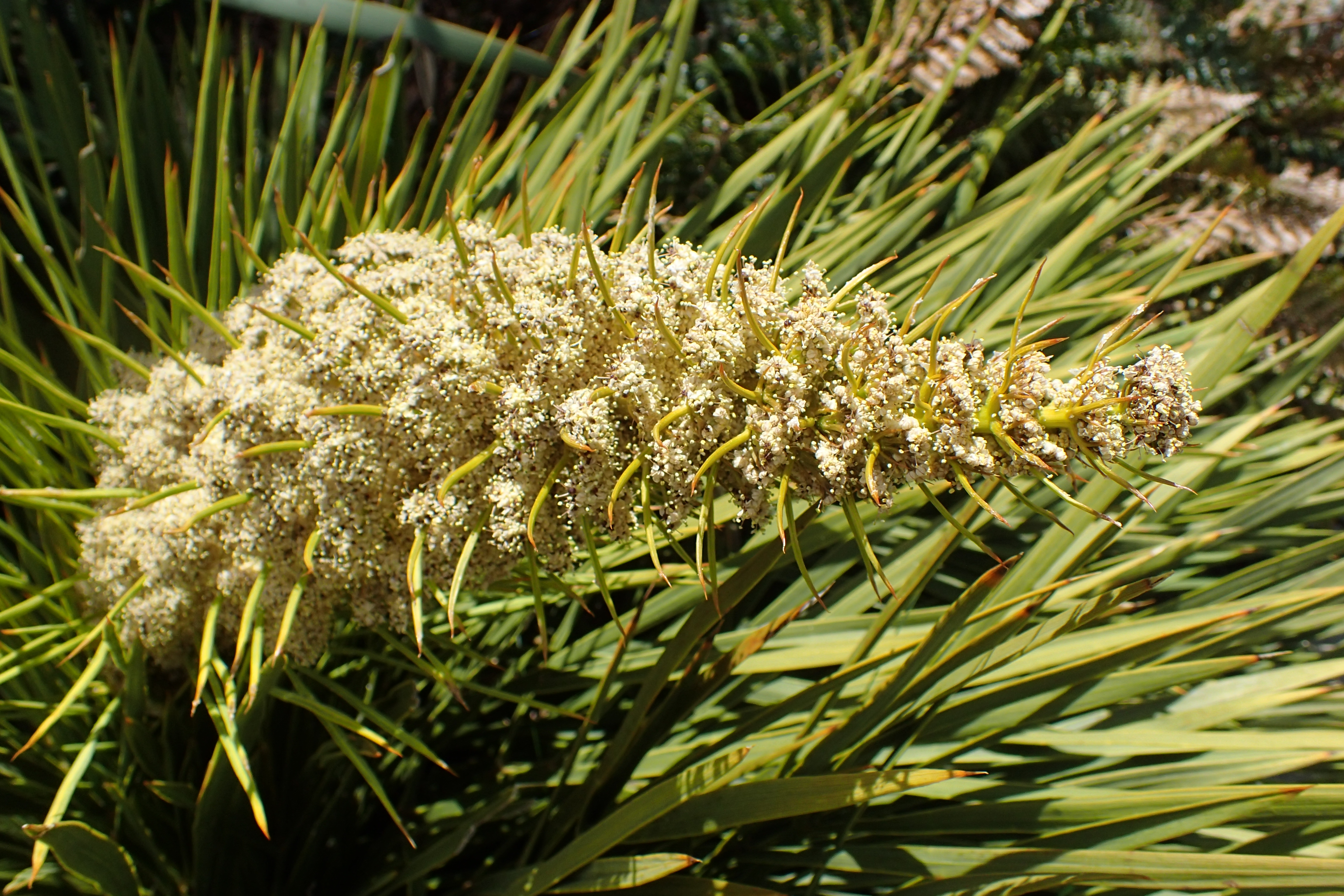
Spiky rosette

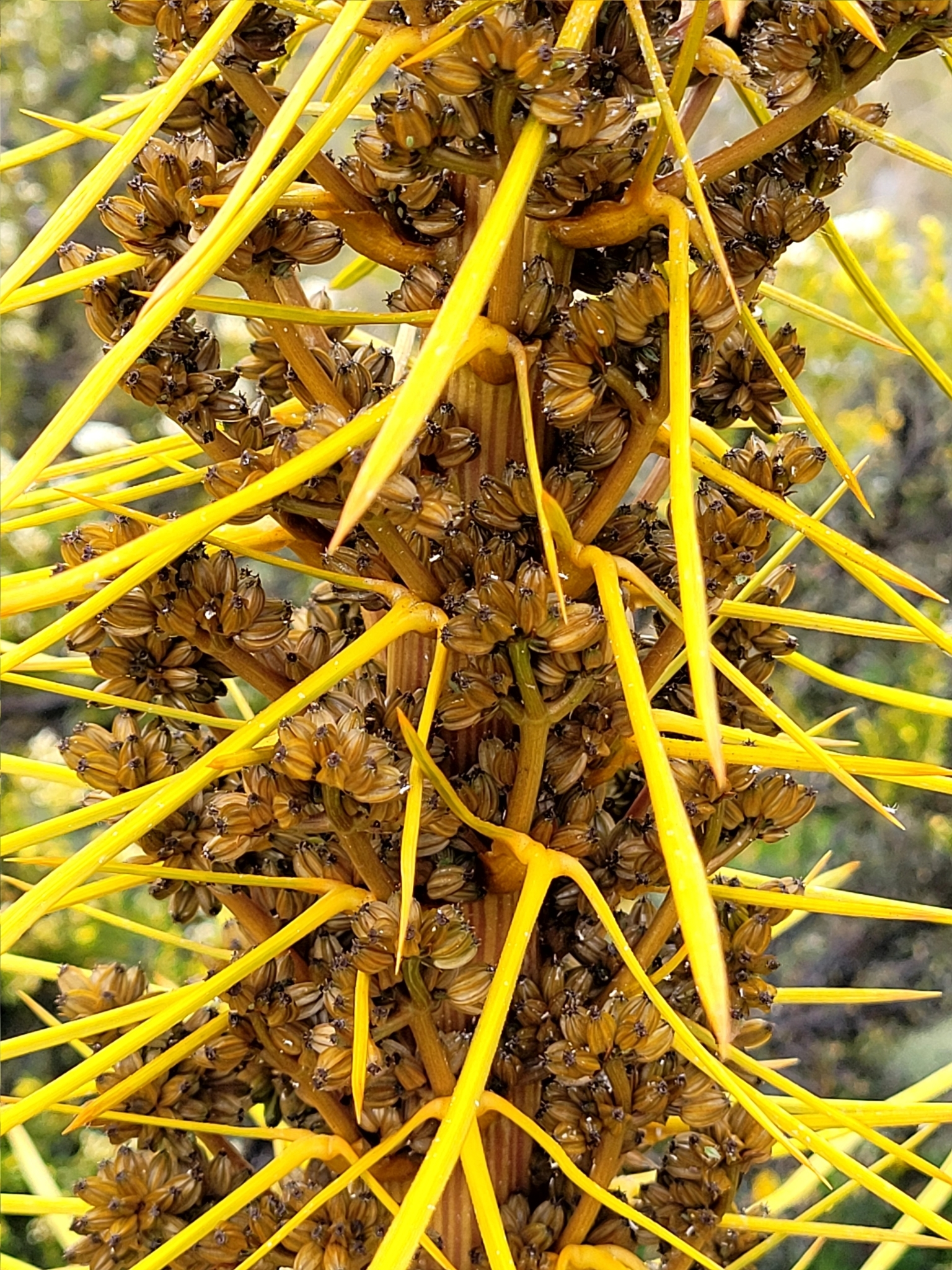
Yellow linear bract of the umbel

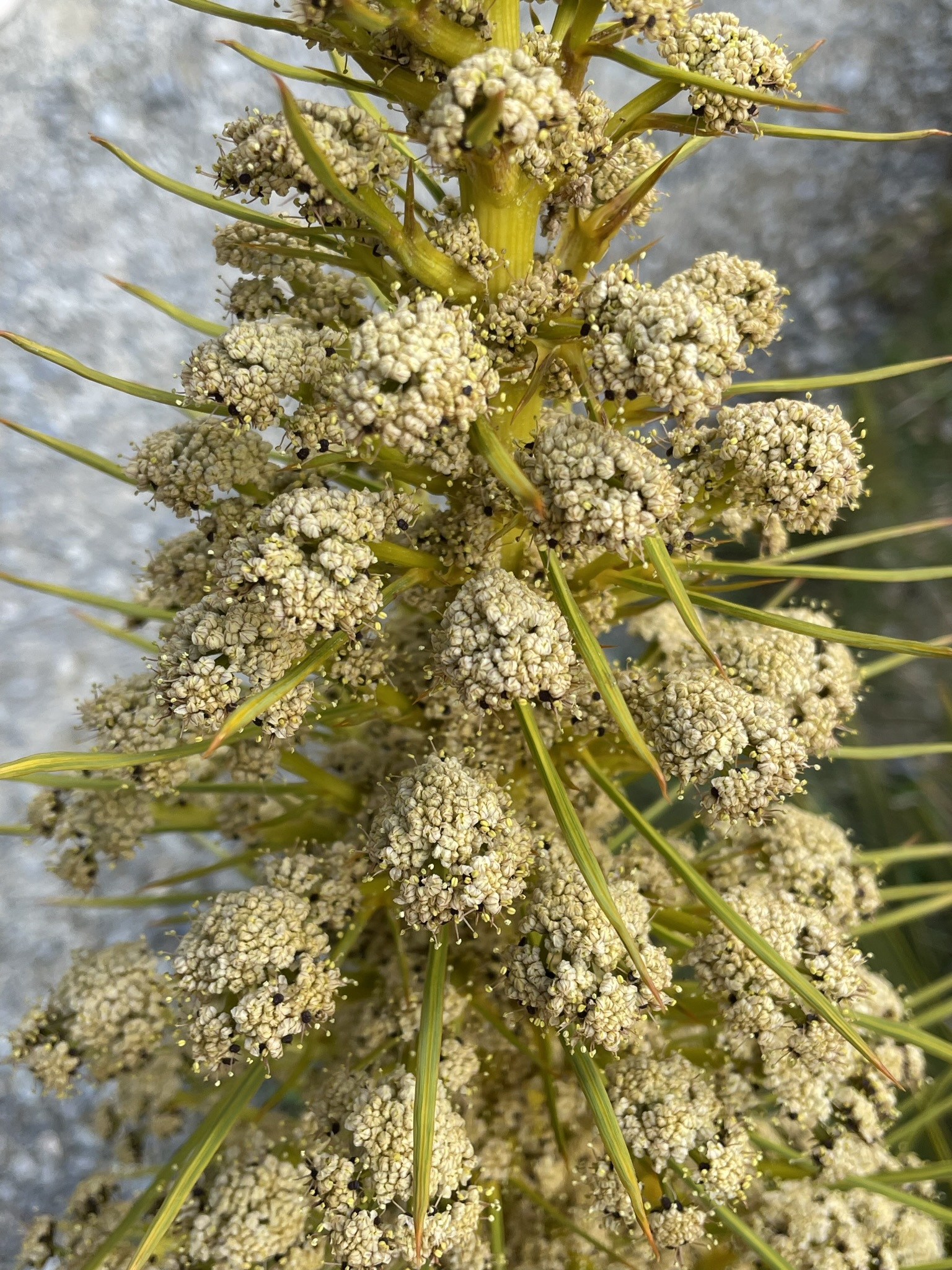
Detail of the compound flower

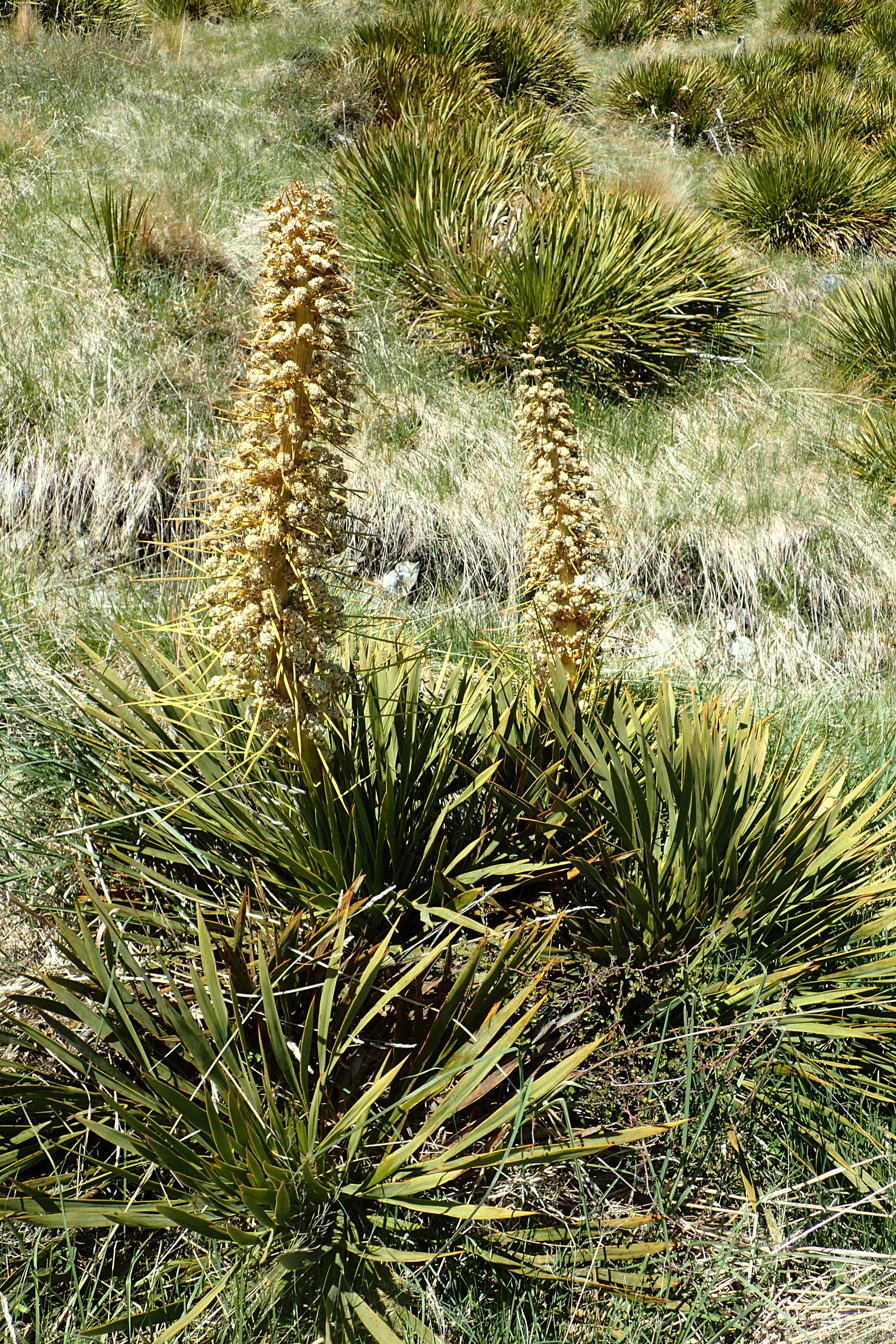
Near Mount Cook

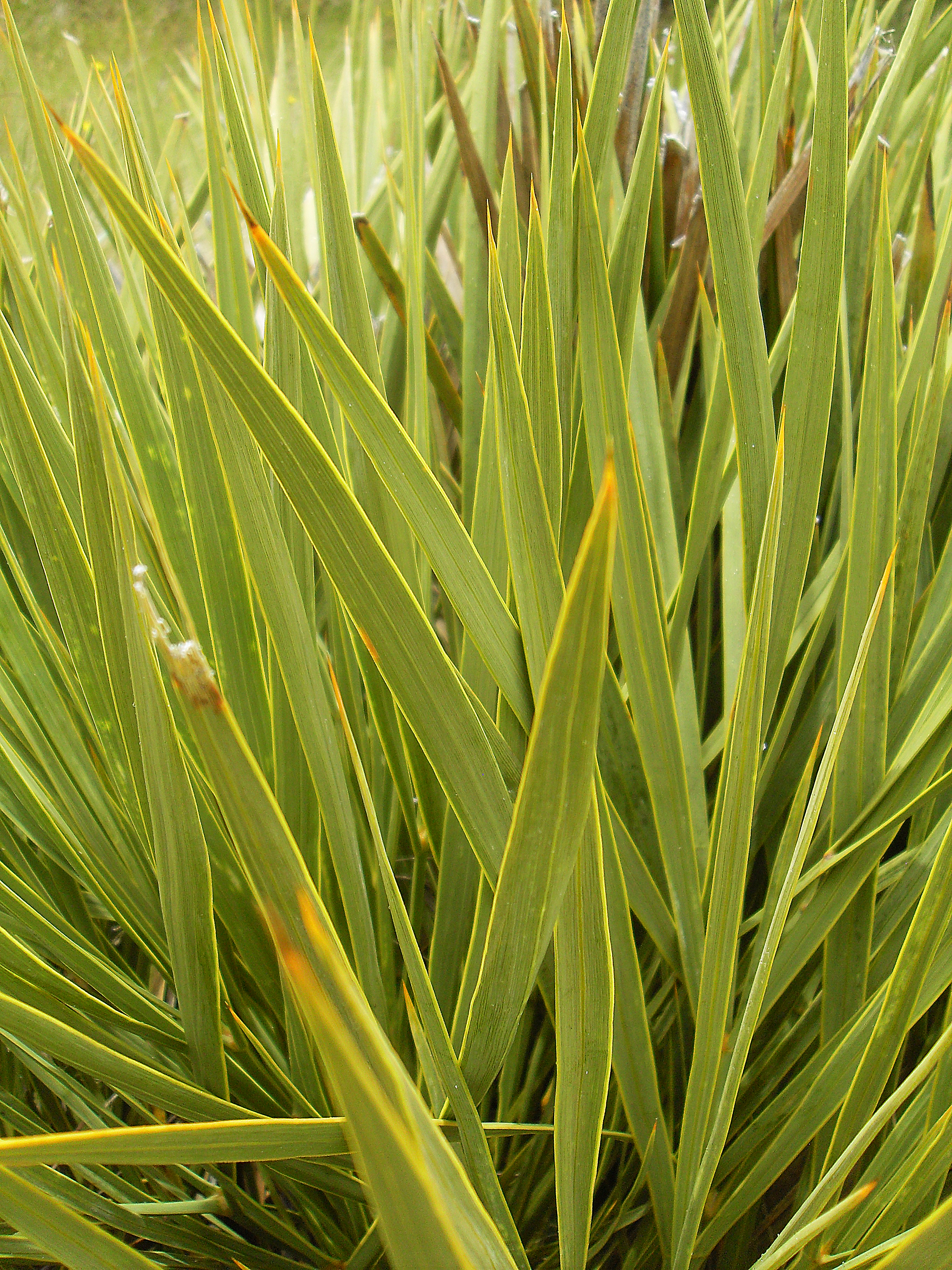
Detail of the leaves
