= The Footstool =

Mountain in Canterbury, New Zealand

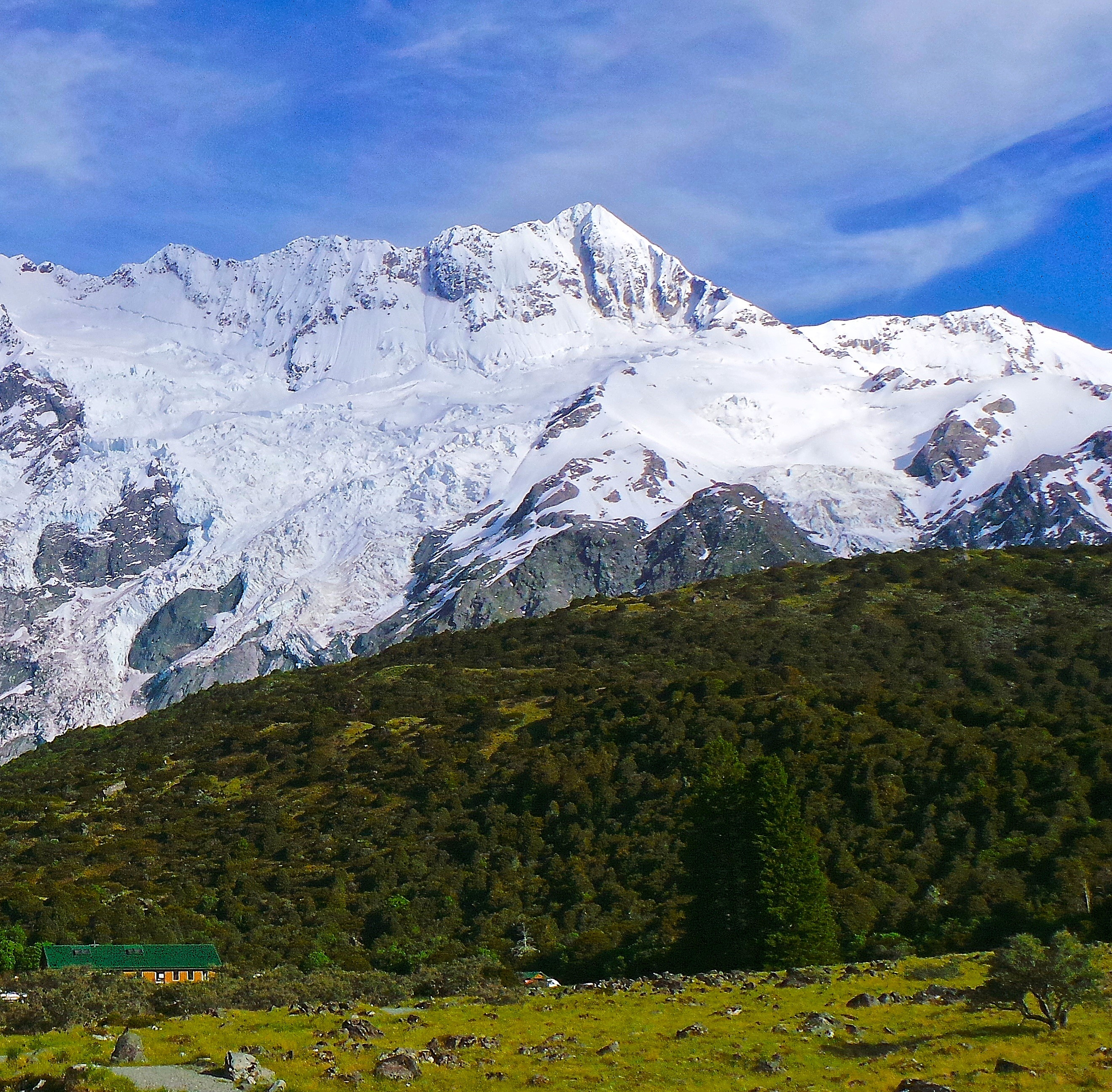
- Southeast aspect

Highest point
- Elevation: 2,764 m (9,068 ft)
- Prominence: 124 m (407 ft)
- Isolation: 1.57 km (0.98 mi)
- Coordinates: 43°40′32″S 170°03′50″E

Naming
- Etymology: Footstool

Geography
- Location within New Zealand
- Interactive map of The Footstool
- Location: South Island
- Country: New Zealand
- Region: Canterbury / West Coast
- Protected area: Aoraki / Mount Cook National Park; Westland Tai Poutini National Park
- Parent range: Southern Alps
- Topo map(s): NZMS260 H36; Topo50 BX15

Climbing
- First ascent: 1894

The Footstool is a 2,764-metre-elevation (9,068-foot) mountain in the Canterbury Region of New Zealand.

== Description ==
The Footstool is situated on the crest or Main Divide of the Southern Alps, and set on the common boundary shared by the Canterbury and West Coast Regions of South Island. It is located six kilometres north of Mount Cook Village and set on the boundary shared by Aoraki / Mount Cook National Park and Westland Tai Poutini National Park. Precipitation runoff from the mountain drains north into the Copland River and south to the Hooker River. Topographic relief is significant as the south face rises nearly 1,900 metres (6,234 feet) above Hooker Lake in three kilometres. The nearest higher peak is Mount Sefton, two kilometres to the west-southwest.

== History ==
The mountain's toponym may have been a humorous invention of surveyor Edward Sealy, originating from a remark sometime before 1871 that one might sit on Mount Sefton with one's feet on the footstool. The first ascent of the summit was made in 1894 by Tom Fyfe and George Graham.

== Climbing ==
Climbing routes on The Footstool:

- Main Divide – Tom Fyfe, George Graham – (1894)
- East Ridge – Jack Clarke, Peter Graham, Henrik Sillem – (1906)
- North Neve – M.R. Barwell, A.F. Reid – (1953)
- Couloir Route (East Face) – Graeme Dingle, Jill Tremain – (1967)
- Direct (East Face) – Ray Button, Graeme Dingle – (1979)
- Wombats on Heat (East Face) – Michael Batchelor, Gordon Poultney – (1988)
- Requiem for a Dream – Greg Abrahams, Euan Boyd, Steve Farrad, Florian L'Hostis – (2007)

== Climate ==
Based on the Köppen climate classification, The Footstool is located in a marine west coast (Cfb) climate zone, with a tundra climate at the summit. Prevailing westerly winds blow moist air from the Tasman Sea onto the mountains, where the air is forced upward by the mountains (orographic lift), causing moisture to drop in the form of rain or snow. This climate supports the Eugenie, Tewaewae, Huddleston, and Fiddian glaciers on this mountain's slopes. The months of December through February offer the most favourable weather for viewing or climbing this peak.

== Gallery ==
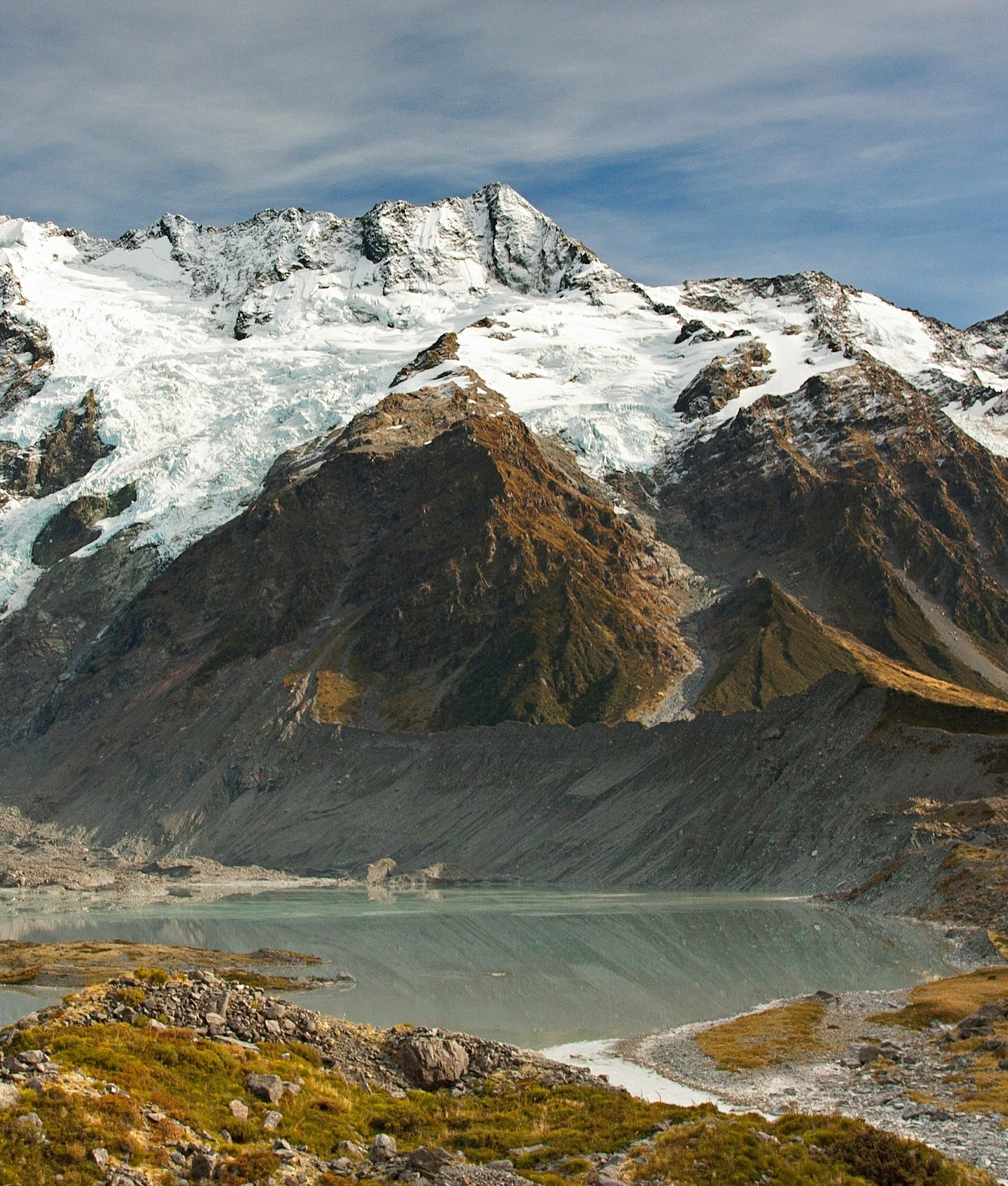

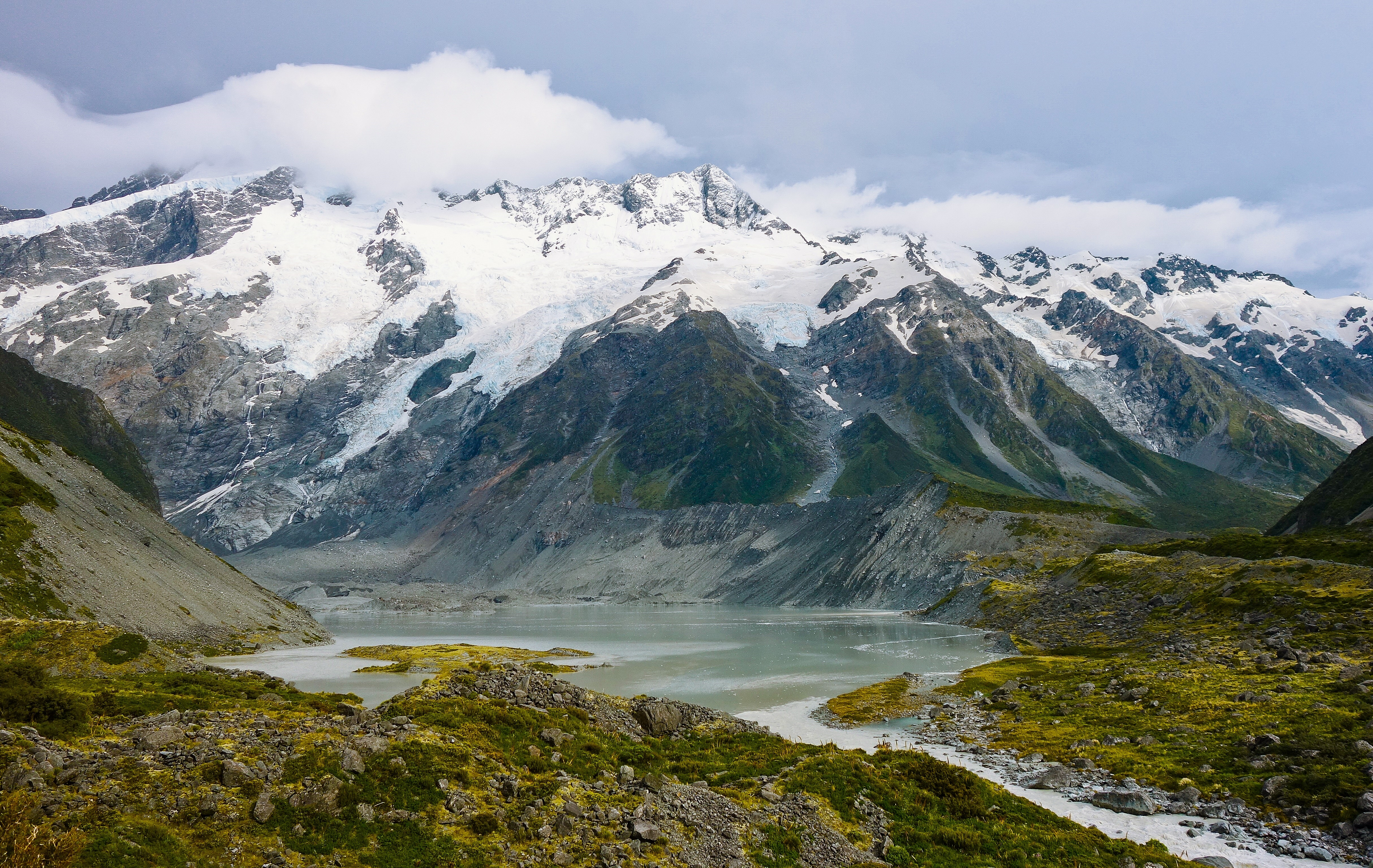
Southeast aspect

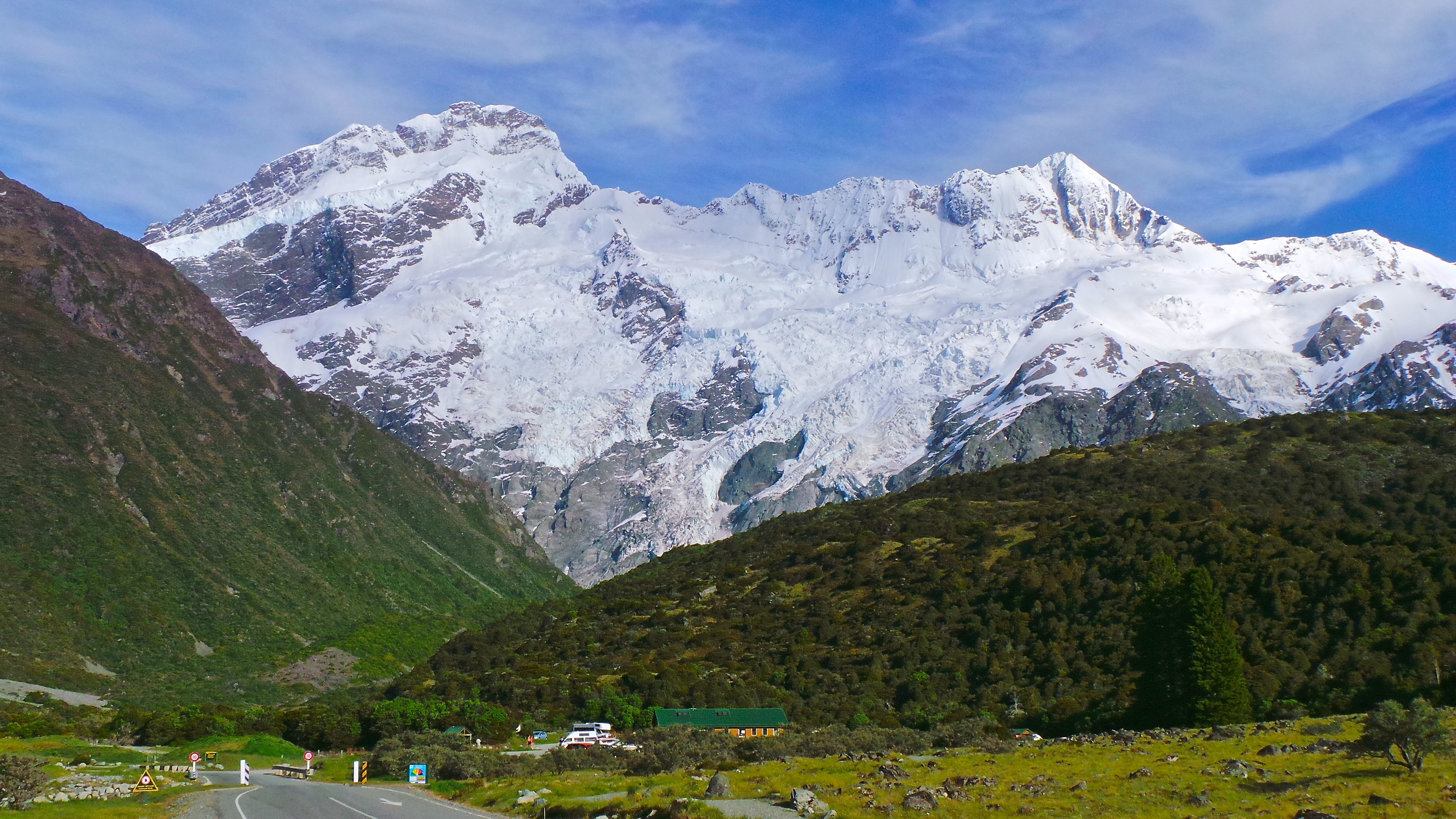
Mount Sefton to left, The Footstool to right

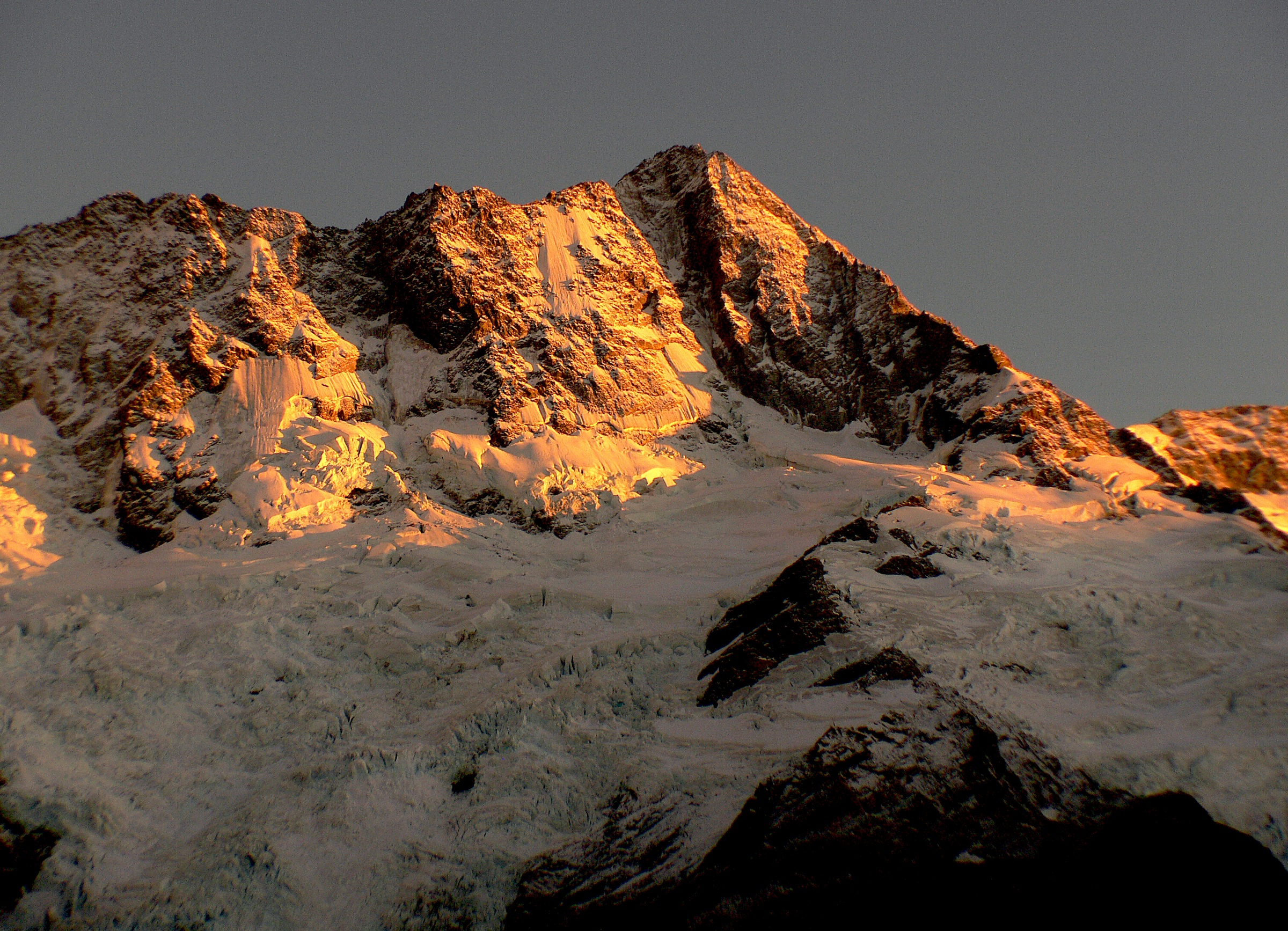
South aspect at sunrise

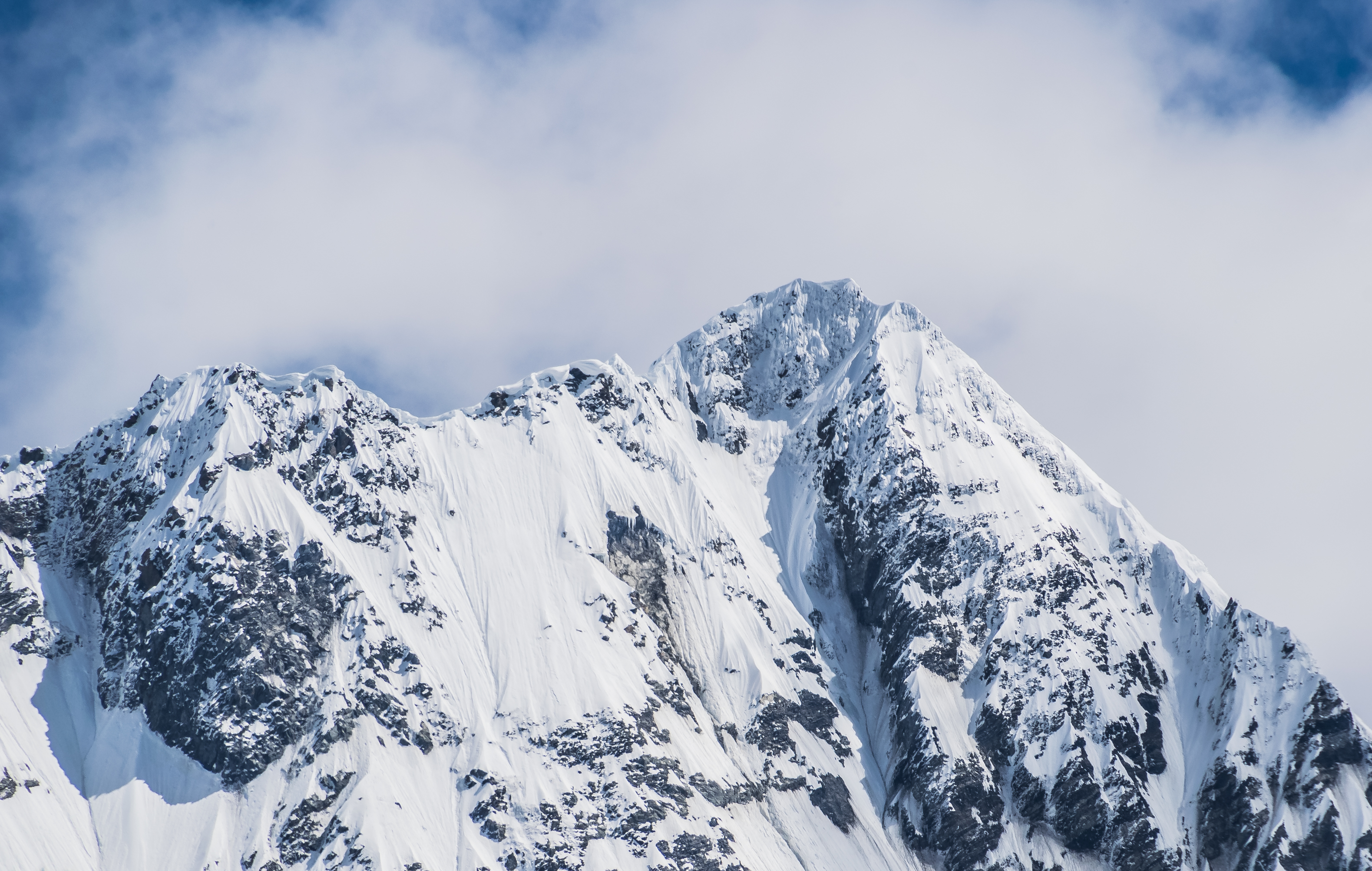

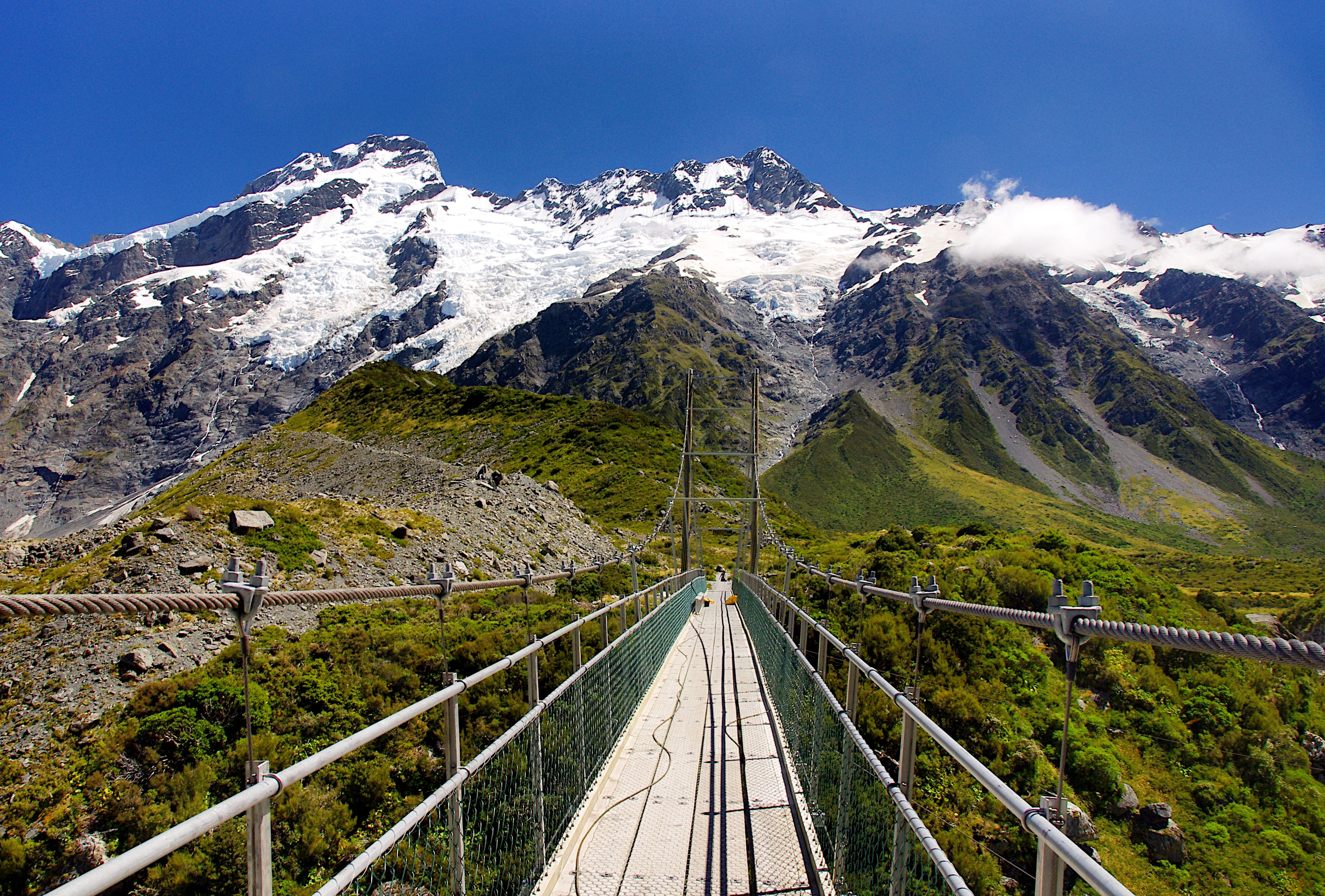
The Footstool straight ahead

== See also ==
- List of mountains of New Zealand by height
