= Tom Fyfe =

New Zealand mountain climber

Thomas Camperdown Fyfe (23 June 1870 – 1947) was a self-taught New Zealand mountaineer born in Timaru. He partook in the first ascent of Aoraki / Mount Cook (the highest mountain in New Zealand) on 25 December 1894, alongside Jack Clarke and George Graham. Following the first Aoraki ascent Fyfe, who was introduced to climbing by Jack Adamson, went on to become the first appointed chief guide at the Hermitage Hotel at Mount Cook Village.
