= Mueller Glacier =

Glacier in New Zealand

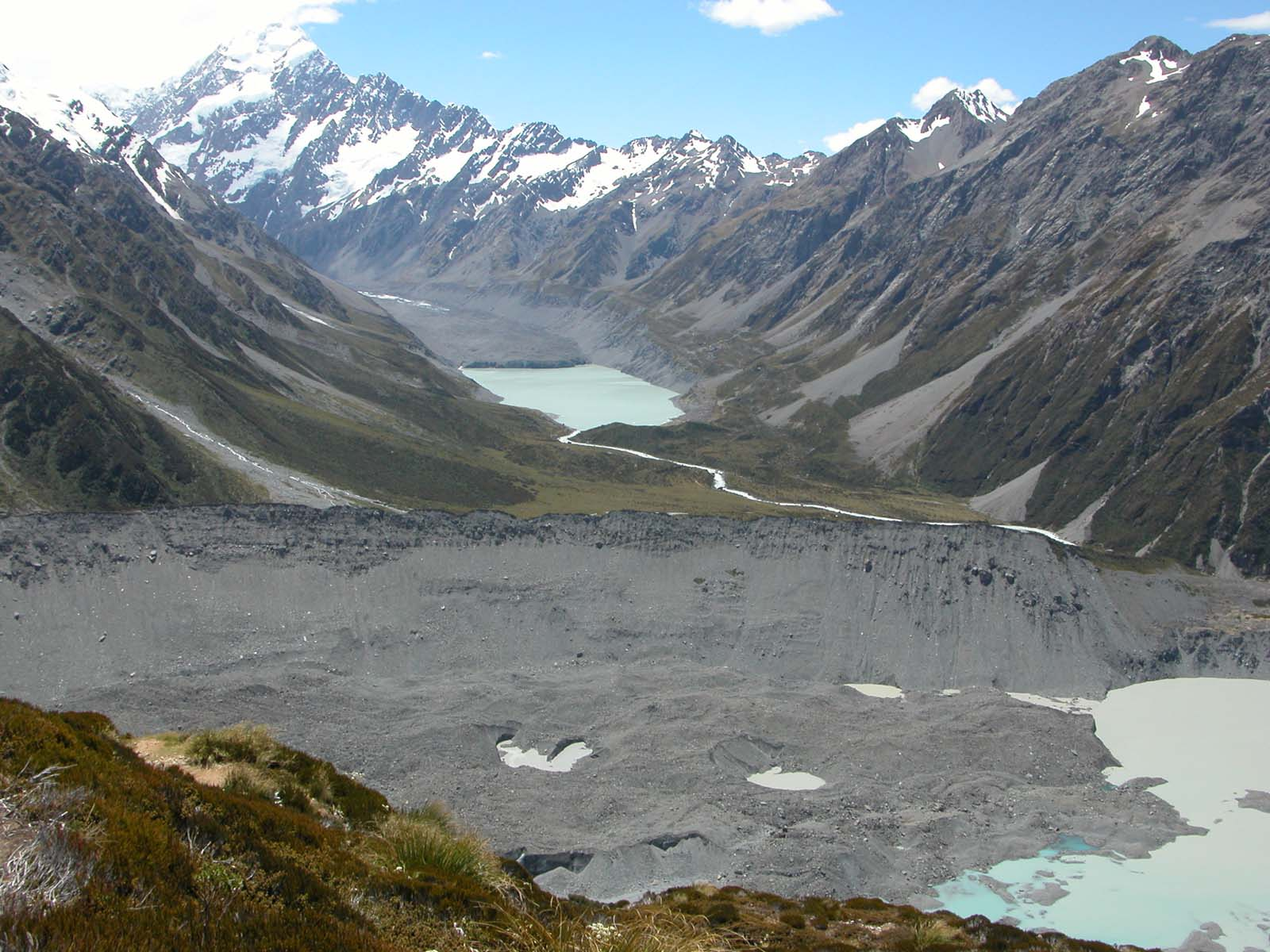
- Mueller glacier (under rubble) and its moraine (foreground). Aoraki / Mount Cook washed out in the background. The Hooker Glacier and its terminal lake are up the valley in the distance.
- Interactive map of Mueller Glacier
- Type: Mountain glacier
- Location: New Zealand
- Coordinates: 43°44′S 170°03′E
- Length: 13 km (8.1 mi)
- Terminus: Mueller Glacier lake (unnamed)
- Status: Retreating

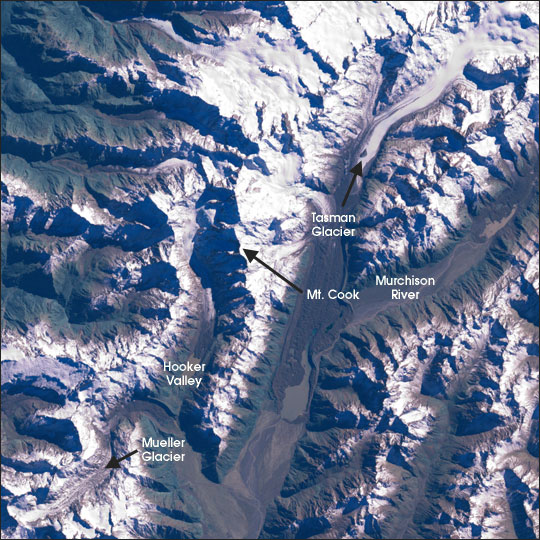
Satellite picture of the Mount Cook region, identifying the Mueller Glacier in the bottom left.

The Mueller Glacier is a 13-kilometre (8.1 mi) long glacier flowing through Aoraki / Mount Cook National Park in the South Island of New Zealand. It lies to the west of Mount Cook Village within the Southern Alps, flowing roughly north-west from its névé near Mount Montgomerie before curving around the Sealy Range as it approaches its terminus. Various other glaciers feed into the Mueller Glacier along its route, including the Frind and Huddleston Glaciers. The glacier ends at a small unnamed terminal lake, which is also fed by meltwater from the nearby Hooker Glacier. This lake is the source for the Hooker River, a small tributary of the Tasman River, which flows into Lake Pukaki.

The glacier was named after German-Australian botanist and explorer Ferdinand von Mueller. The Mueller Hut, located on the ridge of the Sealy Range east of the Mueller Glacier, was also named after Ferdinand von Mueller.

Based on dating of a yellow-green lichen of the Rhizocarpon subgenus, Mueller Glacier is considered to have had a Little Ice Age maximum mass between 1725 and 1730. White Horse Hill, a small hill to the north of Mount Cook Village, represents the moraine left from this period.

== See also ==
- List of glaciers
- Mueller Glacier Glaciers online J. Alean, M. Hambrey
