= Mount Gizeh =

Mountain in the Canterbury Region of New Zealand

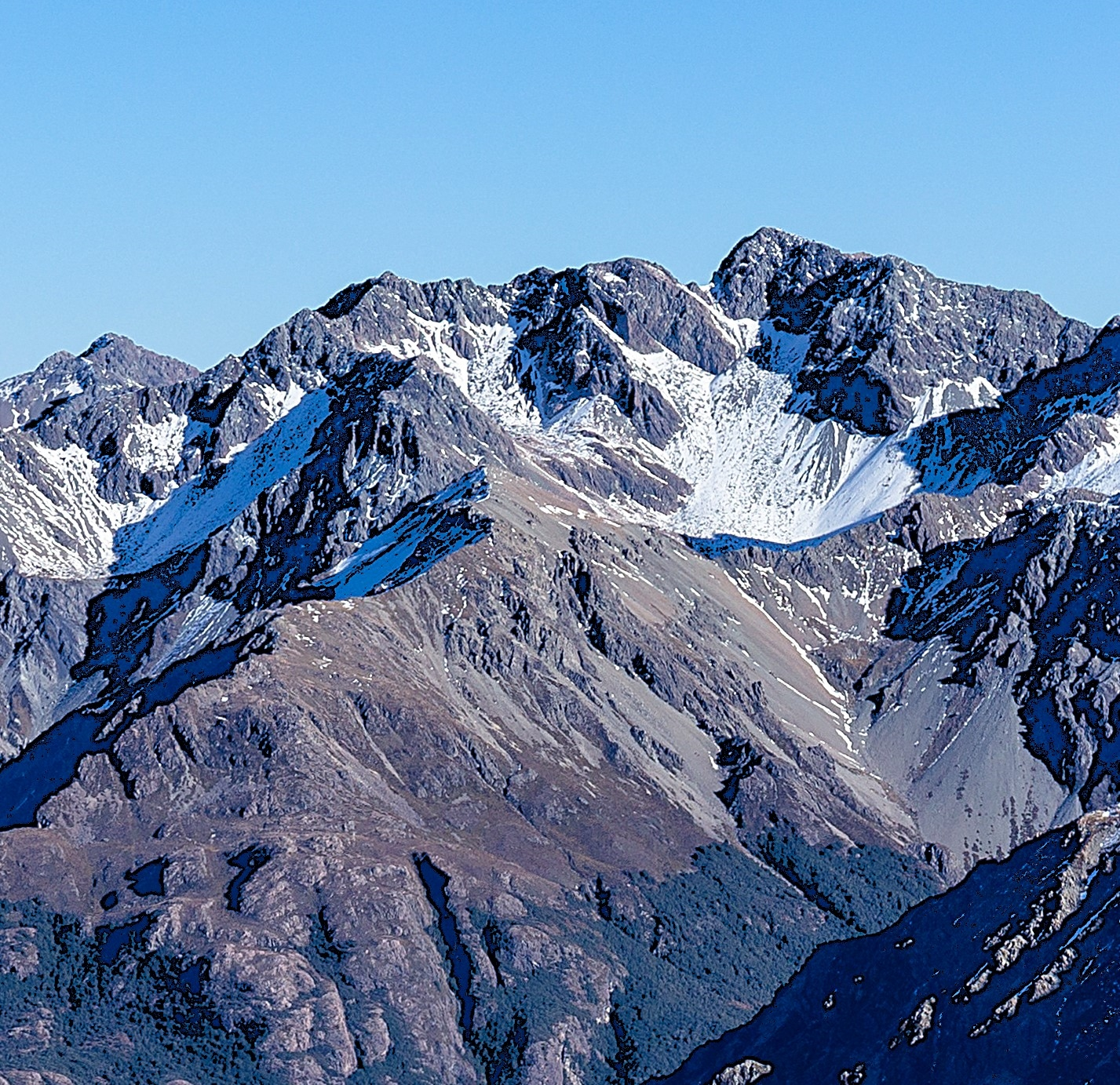
- Northeast aspect

Highest point
- Elevation: 2,162 m (7,093 ft)
- Prominence: 310 m (1,017 ft)
- Isolation: 3.4 km (2.1 mi)
- Coordinates: 43.03060°S 171.43920°E

Naming
- Etymology: Pyramid of Gizeh

Geography
- Location within New Zealand
- Interactive map of Mount Gizeh
- Location: South Island
- Country: New Zealand
- Region: Canterbury
- Protected area: Arthur's Pass National Park
- Parent range: Southern Alps; Black Range
- Topo map(s): Topo50 BV20 728 346; NZMS260 K34

Geology
- Rock age: Triassic
- Rock type: Rakaia Terrane

Climbing
- First ascent: 1930

Mount Gizeh is a 2,162-metre-elevation (7,093-foot) mountain in the Canterbury Region of New Zealand.

== Description ==
Mount Gizeh is located 115 kilometres (71 mi) northwest of Christchurch in Arthur's Pass National Park. It is part of the Black Range of the Southern Alps in the South Island. Precipitation runoff from the mountain's northeast slope drains to the Anti Crow River, whereas all other slopes drain into the Avoca River. Topographic relief is significant as the summit rises 1,060 metres (3,478 feet) above the Avoca Valley in two kilometres. The nearest higher peak is Mount Greenlaw, 2.38 kilometres to the west-northwest. "Gizeh" is an older, French-based transliteration of the Arabic name for the city of Giza, home to the Giza pyramid complex which includes the Great Sphinx of Giza. Sphinx Saddle is the official name of the pass to the east of Mount Gizeh.

== Climbing ==
The first ascent of the summit was made on 19 April 1930 by R.E. Clark, John Pascoe, and A.G. Flower via the Anti Crow River.

Climbing routes:

- Via Anti Crow River
- North Ridge
- Via Echo Col
- Northeast Face

== Climate ==
Based on the Köppen climate classification, Mount Gizeh is located in a marine west coast (Cfb) climate zone, with a subpolar oceanic climate (Cfc) at the summit. Prevailing westerly winds blow moist air from the Tasman Sea onto the mountains, where the air is forced upwards by the mountains (orographic lift), causing moisture to drop in the form of rain or snow. The months of December through February offer the most favourable weather for viewing or climbing this peak.

== See also ==
- List of mountains of New Zealand by height
