= List of mountains of New Zealand by height =

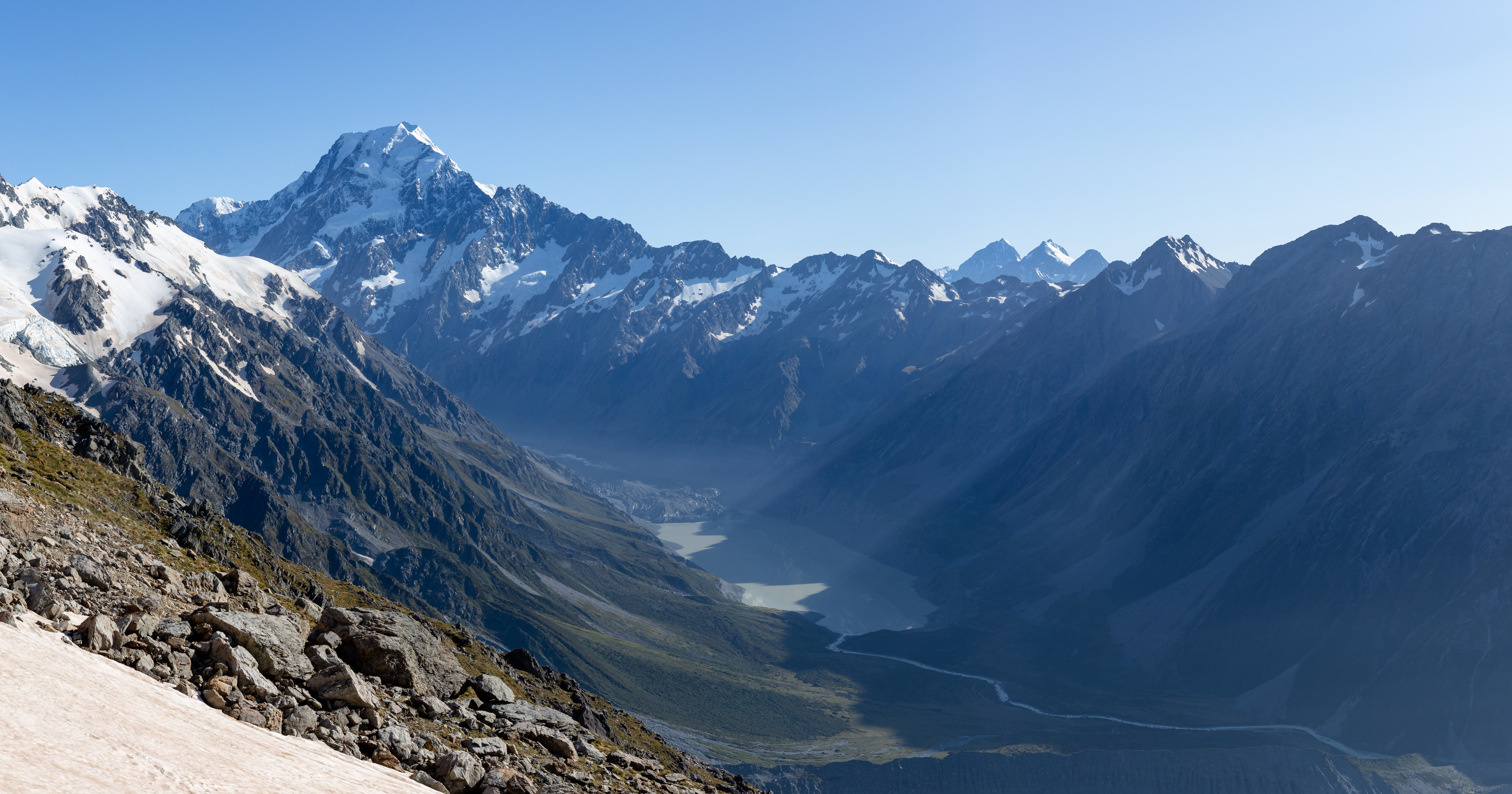
Aoraki / Mount Cook, located in New Zealand's South Island, is the highest point in the country

The following are lists of mountains in New Zealand (Note: These lists exclude mountains in the Ross Dependency, an area of Antarctica claimed by and administered by New Zealand, though could include the similarly claimed and administered Balleny Islands. These claims are in abeyance, in accord with the Antarctic Treaty. If mountains in the Ross Dependency were included in this list, several notable peaks would appear in the upper part of this list, including Mount Erebus which, at 3,795 metres (12,451 ft), would outrank Aoraki / Mount Cook, and the Admiralty Mountains of Victoria Land.) ordered by height. Names, heights, topographic prominence and isolation, and coordinates were extracted from the official Land Information New Zealand (LINZ) Topo50 topographic maps at the interactive topographic map of New Zealand site.

Mountains are referred to as maunga in the Māori language.

== Named summits over 2,900 m ==
All summits over 2,900 metres (9,500 ft) are within the Southern Alps, a chain that forms the backbone of the South Island, and all but one (Mount Aspiring / Tititea) are within a 10-mile (16 km) radius of Aoraki / Mount Cook. Some of these summits are mere shoulders on the ridges of Aoraki and Mount Tasman.

Gordon Hasell was the first person who, by 1960, had climbed all New Zealand's peaks above 10,000 feet (3,000 m). The achievement mentions 27 peaks and it thus counts individual peaks that may make up one mountain, e.g. Mount Haast has three individual peaks that are all above that height.

Rank	Summit	Height		Prominence (Note: In the absence of a height for the key col, the prominence is estimated from contour lines and presented in italics.)		Isolation		Nearest higher peak
Rank	Summit	m	ft	m	ft	km	miles	Nearest higher peak
1	Aoraki / Mount Cook (Note: The high peak of Aoraki was 3,764 m or 12,349 ft high until 14 December 1991, when a massive rock/ice collapse broke off 10 m (33 ft). Subsequent erosion of the exposed ice cap reduced its height by a further 30 m (98 ft) as of November 2013.)	3,724	12,218	3,724	12,218	3,140	1,950	Mount Minto, Admiralty Mountains
2	Aoraki: Middle Peak	3,717	12,195	40	130	0.8	0.5	High Peak
3	Aoraki: Low Peak	3,593	11,788	47	154	0.5	0.3	Middle Peak
4	Mount Tasman	3,497	11,473	519	1,703	3.2	2.0	Aoraki
5	Mount Dampier	3,440	11,286	92	302	0.3	0.2	Aoraki
6	Mount Vancouver	3,309	10,856	20	60	0.3	0.2	Mount Dampier
7	Silberhorn	3,300	10,827	35	115	0.3	0.2	Mount Tasman
8	Malte Brun	3,198	10,492	780	2,559	11.3	7.0	Mount Tasman
9	Mount Hicks	3,198	10,492	70	230	0.5	0.3	Mount Dampier
10	Lendenfeld Peak	3,194	10,479	101	331	0.5	0.3	Mount Tasman
11	Mount Graham	3,184	10,446	14	46	0.3	0.2	Silberhorn
12	Torres Peak	3,160	10,367	110	360	0.5	0.3	Mount Tasman
13	Mount Sefton	3,151	10,338	1063	3,488	11.9	6.8	Aoraki
14	Mount Teichelmann	3,144	10,315	15	50	0.1	0.1	Mount Graham
15	Mount Haast	3,114	10,217	127	417	0.5	0.3	Lendenfeld Peak
16	Mount Elie de Beaumont	3,109	10,200	648	2,126	8.8	5.5	Mount Haast
17	La Perouse	3,078	10,098	496	1,627	3.2	2.0	Aoraki
18	Douglas Peak	3,077	10,095	318	1,043	2.7	1.6	Mount Haast
19	Mount Haidinger	3,070	10,072	160	525	1.1	0.7	Douglas Peak
20	Mount Magellan	3,049	10,003	20	60	0.2	0.1	Mount Teichelmann
21	Malaspina	3,042	9,980	10	35	0.1	0.1	Mount Vancouver
22	The Minarets	3,040	9,974	560	1,835	5.2	3.2	Elie de Beaumont
23	Mount Aspiring / Tititea	3,033	9,951	2471	8,107	130.6	81.1	Mount Sefton
24	Mount Hamilton	3,025	9,925	340	1,115	1.6	1.0	Malte Brun
25	Dixon Peak	3,004	9,856	60	200	0.3	0.2	Mount Haast
26	Glacier Peak	3,002	9,849	75	250	0.6	0.4	Douglas Peak
27	Mount Chudleigh	2,966	9,731	483	1,585	3.2	2.0	Malte Brun
28	Haeckel Peak	2,965	9,728	255	840	1.9	1.2	Mount Hamilton
29	Drake	2,960	9,711	110	360	0.2	0.1	Magellan
30	Mount Darwin	2,952	9,685	225	740	1.5	0.9	Haeckel Peak
31	Aiguilles Rouges	2,950	9,678	240	790	1.5	0.9	Mount Chudleigh
32	De La Beche	2,950	9,678	40	130	0.3	0.2	Minarets
33	Mount Annan	2,934	9,626	85	280	0.7	0.4	Mount Darwin
34	Mount Low	2,932	9,619	87	285	0.4	0.2	La Perouse
35	Nazomi	2,925	9,596	106	348	0.6	0.4	Aoraki (Low Peak)
36	Mount Gold Smith	2,909	9,544	40	130	0.3	0.2	Minarets
37	Mount Walters	2,905	9,531	115	380	0.4	0.3	Elie de Beaumont

== The 100 highest mountains ==
These are all the mountains over 2,400 metres (7,900 ft) with a topographic prominence (drop) of at least 300 metres (980 ft), closely matching those on the list of mountains of New Zealand by the New Zealand Alpine Club. Five peaks overlooked on that list are indicated with an asterisk. Of these 100 mountains, all but two — Ruapehu (Tahurangi Peak) (19th highest) and Mount Taranaki (65th highest) — are in the South Island. Tapuae-o-Uenuku, in the Kaikōura Ranges, is the highest peak outside the Southern Alps.

Rank	Mountain	Height (m)	Drop (m)	Isol. (km)	Coordinates	First ascent	First ascent party (Note: First ascent dates and parties were mostly extracted from the National Route database at Climb NZ.)
1	Aoraki / Mount Cook	3,724	3,724	3,140	43°35′42″S 170°08′32″E	25 Dec 1894	Jack Clarke, Tom Fyfe, George Graham
2	Mount Tasman	3,497	519	3.2	43°33′57″S 170°09′26″E	5 Feb 1895	Jack Clarke, Edward FitzGerald, Matthias Zurbriggen
3	Malte Brun	3,199	780	11.3	43°33′44″S 170°18′18″E	7 Mar 1894	Tom Fyfe
4	Mount Sefton	3,151	1,063	10.9	43°40′57″S 170°02′32″E	14 Feb 1895	Edward FitzGerald, Matthias Zurbriggen
5	Mount Elie de Beaumont	3,109	648	8.8	43°28′54″S 170°19′41″E	15 Feb 1906	Peter Graham, Henrik Sillem
6	La Perouse	3,078	496	3.2	43°36′05″S 170°05′32″E	1 Feb 1906	Peter Graham, R S Low, Henry Newton, Ebenezer Teichelmann
7	Douglas Peak	3,077	318	2.7	43°32′30″S 170°12′09″E	28 Jan 1907	Alexander Graham, Henry Newton, Ebenezer Teichelmann
8	The Minarets	3,040	560	5.2	43°30′35″S 170°16′28″E	9 Feb 1897	Tom Fyfe, Malcolm Ross
9	Mount Aspiring / Tititea	3,033	2,471	130.6	44°23′03″S 168°43′41″E	23 Nov 1909	Bernard Head, Jack Clarke, Peter Graham
10	Mount Hamilton	3,025	340	1.6	43°33′16″S 170°19′46″E	1 Dec 1909	Laurence M Earle, Bernard Head, Jack Clarke, Peter Graham
11	Mount Chudleigh	2,966	483	3.2	43°35′14″S 170°16′43″E	Jan 1911	Hugh Chambers, Freda Du Faur, Jim Murphy
12	Tapuae-o-Uenuku (Note: Highest peak outside the Southern Alps) (Note: In the Inland Kaikōura Range)	2,885	2,022	318.7	41°59′45″S 173°39′46″E	Apr 1864	Nehemiah McRae and two others
13	Mount Alarm	2,877	315	2.6	42°00′34″S 173°38′15″E	1928	T H S Fyfe and I E Rawnsley
14	Mount D'Archiac	2,875	1,153	20.0	43°27′54″S 170°34′54″E	12 Mar 1910	Jim Dennistoun, Laurence Earle, Jack Clarke
15	Mount Earnslaw	2,830	1,359	36.3	44°37′20″S 168°24′38″E	16 Mar 1890	Harry Birley
16	Hochstetter Dome	2,827	392	2.1	43°30′09″S 170°20′57″E	27 Mar 1883	Anna and Robert von Lendenfeld, Harry Dew
17	Mount Hutton	2,822	662	7.3	43°36′16″S 170°23′29″E	17 Jan 1914	Conrad Kain, H. Otto Frind
18	Mount Sibbald	2,811	717	9.8	43°33′06″S 170°33′17″E	8 Jan 1917	Edgar Williams and William Kennedy
19	Ruapehu (Tahurangi Peak) (Note: Highest peak on the North Island)	2,797	2,797	341.9	39°17′22″S 175°33′46″E	Feb 1879	George Beetham, Joseph Maxwell
20	Mount Arrowsmith	2,781	911	34.2	43°21′25″S 170°58′42″E	4 Feb 1912	Hugh F. Wright and Jim P. Murphy
21	The Nuns Veil	2,749	559	11.3	43°41′36″S 170°14′51″E	4 Dec 1905	Peter Graham, Mick Collett, Dr Mackay,
22	Mount Burns	2,746	376	7.3	43°44′43″S 169°59′05″E	1909	B. Head, A. and P. Graham, Darby Thomson, L. Earle, J. Clarke
23	Mount Tūtoko	2,723	2,191	30.4	44°35′40″S 168°00′45″E	4 Mar 1924	Samuel Turner and Peter Graham
24	Jagged Peak	2,706	315	3.4	43°20′00″S 171°00′37″E	Dec 1931	Evan Wilson, Andy Anderson, Doug Brough, Stan Barnett
25	Mount Hopkins	2,678	507	5.1	43°47′27″S 169°57′48″E	11 Mar 1914	Samuel Turner, Peter Graham, Frank Milne
26	Mount Mannering (Note: Brodrick Peak and Mount Mannering are equally high summits separated by the 2,400 m Whataroa Saddle (269 m drop))	2,669	446	4.6	43°29′12″S 170°24′40″E	7 Mar 1914	Conrad Kain, H. Otto Frind
26	Brodrick Peak	2,669	446	2.8	43°29′54″S 170°23′39″E	Jan 1917	Will A. Kennedy, Jack Lipp
28	Mount Whitcombe	2,650	921	15.2	43°12′58″S 170°54′46″E	28 Dec 1931	Roger Chester, Alan Willis, Bill Mirams
29	Mount Ward	2,645	624	12.3	43°51′59″S 169°50′03″E	Jan 1934	Selwyn Grave, E.A. Hogg, Edgar Williams
30	Rob Roy Peak	2,644	458	6.9	44°27′05″S 168°43′21″E	2 Mar 1935	Ernie Smith, Monty McClymont, Cedric Benzoni, Bob Fullerton, George Palmer, Don Divers, Russell & George Edwards, Gordon Edward
31	Mount Dechen	2,643	1,198	10.0	43°47′49″S 169°45′20″E	Mar 1935	Marjorie Edgar-Jones, Gladys Acton-Adams, Frank Alack, Tom Christie
32	Mount Hooker	2,640	1,201	7.6	43°49′51″S 169°40′27″E	Dec 1928	Samuel Turner, Cyril Turner
33	Mount Moffat	2,638	500	4.5	43°27′41″S 170°27′20″E	Jan 1933	A J Scott, Alf Brustad, Russell Fraser,
34	Red Peak *	2,637	307	2.6	43°18′51″S 170°59′22″E	Jan 1933	H W (Sandy) Cormack, Lloyd Wilson
35	The Abbot	2,630	320	4.3	43°39′57″S 170°17′35″E	21 Jan 1918	Peter Graham, I. Chambers, B. Holdsworth, D. Theomin
36	Mount Sealy	2,627	635	4.7	43°45′53″S 170°02′44″E	24 Jan 1895	Jack Clarke, C L Barrow, Edward FitzGerald, Matthias Zurbriggen
37	Mitre Peak	2,621	399	1.7	42°00′17″S 173°36′34″E	Jan 1895	Alexander, Fowler, Neville, Moore
38	Mount Edward	2,620	1,145	11.1	44°27′59″S 168°35′05″E	1914	Bernard Head, Jack Clarke and Colin Ferrier
39	Mount Evans	2,620	522	3.5	43°11′08″S 170°55′33″E	1 Jan 1934	John D. Pascoe, Gavin Malcolmson, Priestley Thomson
40	Mount Lucia *	2,617	345	4.8	43°38′44″S 170°21′17″E	Jan 1953	C S Brockett, S J Harris, N D Dench, N Feierabend
41	Sir William Peak	2,610	535	3.1	44°35′32″S 168°24′16″E	Dec 1930	Jock A. Sim, V.J. Leader, Ken Grinling
42	Manakau	2,608	1,798	23.8	42°13′30″S 173°37′03″E	1874	James Ingram
43	Mount Avalanche	2,606	380	3.3	44°25′19″S 168°44′28″E	Jan 1935	Dennis Leigh, Bill Walker & Jock Sim
44	Dilemma Peak	2,602	410	1.9	43°37′31″S 170°05′21″E	27 Mar 1914	Tom Fyfe, Conrad Kain
45	Mount Conrad	2,598	344	2.6	43°33′40″S 170°25′09″E	9 Mar 1914	Conrad Kain, H. Otto Frind
46	Mount Glenmary	2,590	585	12.7	43°58′35″S 169°52′41″E	Nov 1934	Scott Gilkison, Ernie Presland, Harry Stevenson
47	Te ao Whekere	2,590	532	7.7	42°11′08″S 173°41′40″E		
48	Mount Loughnan	2,590	360	3.4	43°26′03″S 170°28′32″E	29 Dec 1935	J Shanks, D A Carty, H Smith, L Dumbleton
49	Mount Head	2,585	480	4.4	44°33′23″S 168°25′47″E	Mar 1914	Hugh Francis Wright
50	Mount Forbes	2,583	350	3.1	43°29′43″S 170°35′16″E	Feb 1912	Hugh F. Wright and Jim P. Murphy
51	The Warrior	2,580	695	10.6	43°20′43″S 170°50′39″E	Dec 1932	H W (Sandy) Cormack, Lloyd Wilson, Sidney (Archie) Wiren, E C A Ferrier
52	O'Leary Peak	2,570	306	0.8	44°36′45″S 168°24′36″E	1890	Harry Birley
53	Mount Acland	2,562	383	4.3	43°31′06″S 170°26′38″E	10 Mar 1914	Conrad Kain, H. Otto Frind
54	Mount Strachan	2,561	410	3.5	43°46′39″S 169°47′29″E	Jan 1935	Marie Byles, Marjorie Edgar-Jones, Harry Ayres, Frank Alack
55	Mount Wolseley	2,558	305	3.9	43°25′46″S 170°31′23″E	Dec 1920	Will Kennedy, Jack Lippe
56	Mauka Atua	2,557	540	10.8	43°52′43″S 170°01′28″E	1948	Norman Hardie
57	Mount William Grant	2,556	472	4.1	43°42′16″S 170°19′17″E	Jan 2015	Mark Flintoft, Lee Burberry
58	The South Thumb	2,546	730	14.2	43°35′35″S 170°43′37″E	Feb 1922	Harold (Ned) Porter, Clive Barker, Hugh Chambers
59	Newton Peak	2,543	644	10.7	43°18′59″S 170°43′01″E	25 Dec 1933	LK Wilson, HW Cormack
60	Mount Williams	2,538	370	5.2	43°50′10″S 169°53′16″E	Dec 1934	Doug Dick, E.W. Hullett, Harry Stevenson
61	Mount Pollux	2,536	1,127	19.9	44°13′56″S 168°52′25″E	Jan 1934	E Miller, J S Shanks, G B Thomas, A J Scott, W Young & J Dumbleton
62	Mount Madeline	2,536	543	2.8	44°36′51″S 168°02′45″E	1920	Alf Cowling, Samuel Turner
63	Mount Maori	2,535	309	3.0	44°26′10″S 168°36′38″E	5 Mar 1935	Russell and Gordon Edwards, Ernie Smith, and Doug Knowles
64	Centaur Peaks E	2,525	1,001	12.7	44°38′07″S 168°34′30″E	Feb 1914	Hugh F. Wright and J. Robertson
65	Mount Taranaki	2,518	2,308	128.5	39°17′46″S 174°03′50″E	23 Dec 1839	Ernst Dieffenbach & James Heberly
66	Mount Castor	2,518	303	1.5	44°13′16″S 168°53′02″E	Mar 1937	C C Benzoni, L W Divers, R R & G L Edwards & D C Peters
67	Mount Lydia	2,517	527	6.0	44°27′56″S 168°30′22″E		
68	Mount Brewster	2,516	938	35.7	44°03′56″S 169°27′00″E	Jan 1929	C.Bentham, Cyril Turner, Samuel Turner
69	Malcolm Peak	2,512	521	5.3	43°17′59″S 170°49′01″E	8 Mar 1911	Ebenezer Teichelmann, Peter Graham, Jack Clarke
70	Mount Tewha / Headlong Peak	2,510	714	8.1	44°32′25″S 168°35′51″E	8 Jan 1958	Leo P. Mangos, G.W. Goodyear, P. Child
71	Alma	2,510	371	1.6	43°33′18″S 170°43′38″E	Dec 1923	Harold (Ned) Porter, Hugh Chambers, Clive Barker
72	Mount Huxley	2,505	870	18.3	44°04′15″S 169°40′43″E	Oct 1939	Scott Gilkison, Roland Rodda, Harry Stevenson, Rod Williams, Max Willis
73	Mount Ian	2,502	414	3.1	44°29′07″S 168°28′36″E	9 Mar 1933	Doug Knowles, Russell R. and Gordon L. Edwards
74	Dun Fiunary	2,500	395	4.1	43°56′43″S 170°01′16″E	Apr 1939	Rex Booth, Reg Winn
75	Mount Glencairn	2,499	430	1.6	43°57′32″S 169°52′39″E	Apr 1936	Jim Dawson, Jim Gilkison, Scott Gilkison, Christopher Johnson
76	Mount Tyndall	2,496	310	3.6	44°31′48″S 168°38′25″E	21 Feb 1936	Frank Wright and J R Simpson
77	McClure Peak	2,486	420	3.9	43°25′54″S 170°36′56″E	Feb 1925	William A Kennedy, Jack Lippe
78	Blair Peak	2,486	410	3.6	43°16′55″S 170°51′19″E	Dec 1932	H W (Sandy) Cormack, Lloyd Wilson, Sidney (Archie) Wiren
79	Lauper Peak	2,485	434	2.9	43°13′37″S 170°56′52″E	Jan 1914	Fred Kitchingham, Charles Ward, Lawrence Gooch
80	Mount Ferguson	2,480	415	3.1	44°39′37″S 168°33′07″E		
81	Mount Christina	2,474	1,076	42.5	44°47′35″S 168°02′54″E	Jan 1925	G. M. Moir, W. G. Grave, K. Roberts, R. S. M. Sinclair, H. Slater
82	Mount Percy Smith	2,465	390	1.4	43°49′24″S 169°53′35″E	Mar 1936	Lloyd Divers, Gordon Edwards, Russell Edwards, Ernie Smith
83	Hells Gates	2,459	555	5.4	43°44′50″S 170°21′27″E		
84	Mount Barth	2,456	530	11.5	44°09′35″S 169°36′12″E	Jan 1936	Lindsay Crozier, Jim Crozier, Bruce Gillies, Selwyn Grave
85	Fettes Peak	2,451	921	6.6	43°45′03″S 169°52′12″E	Jan 1935	Archie Scott, Christopher Johnson, Scott Russell
86	Pt 2447	2,447	440	4.7	43°45′37″S 170°18′08″E		
87	Climax Peak	2,446	697	9.3	44°27′24″S 168°21′55″E		
88	Mount Kensington	2,444	634	6.6	43°17′29″S 170°38′20″E	28 Dec 1935	John D. Pascoe, AF Pearson, HA McDowall, HM Sweeney
89	Pt 2444	2,444	440	2.8	43°42′04″S 170°21′28″E		
90	Mount Jackson	2,434	493	4.2	43°53′33″S 169°47′36″E	Dec 1934	Jim Dawson, Christopher Johnson, Scott Russell
91	Kaimakamaka	2,431	370	4.2	43°58′36″S 170°03′05″E		
92	Mount Radove	2,430	528	6.3	43°41′51″S 170°26′10″E		
93	Mount Lambert	2,430	328	2.8	43°17′28″S 170°44′37″E	30 Dec 1933	LW Boot, IW Tucker and H Andrewes
94	Pt 2428 *	2,428	325	3.9	43°50′09″S 170°02′01″E		
95	Mount Farrar	2,424	300	2.5	43°18′38″S 170°39′24″E	27 Dec 1935	N Barker, GDT Hall
96	The Marquee *	2,421	417	1.9	43°20′39″S 171°02′41″E	Mar 1932	W. McBeth, R. Booth, W. Baker, C. Hilgendorf, R. & D. Twyneham
97	Tarahaka	2,414	365	2.7	42°09′25″S 173°42′58″E		
98	Soloist Peak	2,414	325	3.0	44°02′23″S 169°42′02″E		
99	Mount Allan Dick (Pt 2413)	2,413	353	6.6	44°43′13″S 168°33′12″E	Dec 1953	J Harrison, B Waterhouse, L G Osborne, B H Williams
100	Mount Blackburn	2,409	459	7.0	43°45′22″S 170°12′06″E	1903	Jack Clarke, C J Bainbridge, W G Tennant
101	Mount Murchison	2,408	1,169	41.4	43°00′14″S 171°22′37″E	Mar 1913	Charles K. Ward and Arthur E. Talbot
102	Mount Symons	2,408	405	3.6	42°02′00″S 173°34′11″E		
103	Mount Chevalier *	2,404	494	5.1	43°34′09″S 170°39′05″E	Dec 1941	Bob Clark-Hall, J L (Pat) Clark-Hall
104	Cloudy Peak	2,403	520	12.8	43°27′39″S 170°46′47″E	Dec 1931	Bryan Barrer, Frank Askin
105	Trireme Peak NW	2,403	385	5.1	43°21′54″S 170°42′27″E	Dec 1935	Neville Barker, Duncan Hall

== Other notable mountains and hills ==
=== Over 2,000 metres ===
- Mount Green – 2,837 m (9,308 ft)
- Mount Spencer – 2,788 m (9,147 ft)
- The Footstool – 2,764 m (9,068 ft)
- Mount Rudolf – 2,743 m (8,999 ft)
- Te Heuheu – 2,732 m (8,963 ft)- highest peak in the north of the crater rim of Mount Ruapehu
- Mount Thomson – 2,642 m (8,668 ft)
- Mount Jervois – 2,630 m (8,629 ft)
- North Peak – 2,628 m (8,622 ft)
- Mount Isabel – 2,598 m (8,524 ft)
- Glentanner Peak – 2,551 m (8,369 ft)
- Pluto Peak – 2,480 m (8,136 ft)
- Mount Cran – 2,444 m (8,018 ft)
- Mount Strauchon – 2,391 m (7,844 ft)
- Mount Edgar Thomson – 2,379 m (7,805 ft)
- Mount Ross – 2,366 m (7,762 ft)
- Mount Alba – 2,360 m (7,743 ft)
- Mount Bonpland – 2,343 m (7,687 ft)
- Turner Peak – 2,341 m (7,680 ft)
- Mount Franklin (Tasman) – 2,340 m (7,677 ft)
- Mount Travers – 2,338 m (7,671 ft)
- Mount Taylor – 2,333 m (7,654 ft)
- Du Faur Peak – 2,330 m (7,644 ft)
- Double Cone – 2,319 m (7,608 ft)
- Te Wera Peak – 2,309 m (7,575 ft)
- Mount Tūwhakarōria – 2,307 m (7,569 ft)
- Pyramid Peak – 2,295 m (7,530 ft)
- Somnus – 2,293 m (7,523 ft)
- Black Peak – 2,289 m (7,510 ft)
- Mount Ngauruhoe – 2,287 m (7,503 ft)
- Mount Davie – 2,280 m (7,480 ft)
- Mount Hopeless – 2,278 m (7,474 ft)
- Mount Rolleston – 2,275 m (7,464 ft)
- Mount Crosscut – 2,263 m (7,425 ft)
- Mount Aurum – 2,245 m (7,365 ft)
- Taiaha Peak – 2,241 m (7,352 ft)
- Lyttle Peak – 2,240 m (7,349 ft)
- Faerie Queene – 2,236 m (7,336 ft)
- Poseidon Peak – 2,229 m (7,313 ft)
- Mount Harper – 2,222 m (7,290 ft)
- Mount Underwood – 2,222 m (7,290 ft)
- Gloriana Peak – 2,218 m (7,277 ft)
- Mount Paske – 2,216 m (7,270 ft)
- Mount Adams – 2,208 m (7,244 ft)
- Karetai Peak – 2,206 m (7,238 ft)
- Mount Awful – 2,192 m (7,192 ft)
- Mount Hutt – 2,185 m (7,169 ft)
- Ngatimamoe Peak – 2,164 m (7,100 ft)
- Mount Gizeh – 2,162 m (7,093 ft)
- Sabre Peak – 2,162 m (7,093 ft)
- Mount Rosa – 2,161 m (7,090 ft)
- Alice Peak – 2,155 m (7,070 ft)
- Mount Turner – 2,150 m (7,054 ft)
- Mount Franklin (Canterbury) – 2,145 m (7,037 ft)
- Mount Cloudsley – 2,107 m (6,913 ft)
- Mount Talbot – 2,105 m (6,906 ft)
- Dobson Peak – 2,095 m (6,873 ft)
- Mount Suter – 2,094 m (6,870 ft)
- Mount Olympus – 2,094 m (6,870 ft)
- David Peaks – 2,093 m (6,867 ft)
- Tuhawaiki Mountain– 2,092 m (6,864 ft)
- Mount Macfarlane – 2,077 m (6,814 ft)
- Tooth Peak – 2,061 m (6,762 ft)
- Mount Oates – 2,054 m (6,739 ft)
- Mount Gunn – 2,044 m (6,706 ft)
- Mount Guinevere – 2,042 m (6,699 ft)
- Thesis Peak – 2,042 m (6,699 ft)
- Mount Wilson – 2,035 m (6,677 ft)
- Mount Damfool – 2,030 m (6,660 ft)
- Mount Dreadful – 2,030 m (6,660 ft)
- Jane Peak – 2,022 m (6,634 ft)
- Mount Scott – 2,009 m (6,591 ft)

=== 1,000 to 2,000 metres ===
- Castle Hill Peak – 1,998 m (6,555 ft)
- Mount Chaos – 1,995 m (6,545 ft)
- Mount Elliot – 1,990 m (6,529 ft)
- Mount Tongariro – 1,978 m (6,490 ft)
- Cecil Peak – 1,978 m (6,490 ft)
- Jean Batten Peak – 1,971 m (6,467 ft)
- Mount Belle – 1,965 m (6,447 ft)
- Mount Moir – 1,965 m (6,447 ft)
- Phipps Peak – 1,965 m (6,447 ft)
- Mount Pisa – 1,963 m (6,440 ft)
- Dome – 1,945 m (6,381 ft)
- Mount Cardrona – 1,936 m (6,352 ft)
- Mount Stewart – 1,934 m (6,345 ft)
- Mount Ollivier – 1,933 m (6,342 ft)
- Benmore Peak (Benmore Range) – 1,932 m (6,339 ft) (site of Benmore Peak Observatory)
- Blimit – 1,921 m (6,302 ft)
- Falling Mountain – 1,901 m (6,237 ft)
- Mount Lyttle – 1,899 m (6,230 ft)
- Mount Owen – 1,875 m (6,152 ft)
- Access Peak – 1,865 m (6,119 ft)
- Mount Eglinton – 1,854 m (6,083 ft)
- Mount Balloon – 1,847 m (6,060 ft)
- Sutherlands Peak (Benmore Range) – 1,846 m (6,056 ft)
- Mount Bealey – 1,836 m (6,024 ft)
- Mount Ajax – 1,834 m (6,017 ft)
- Mills Peak – 1,825 m (5,988 ft)
- Totara Peak (Benmore Range) – 1,822 m (5,978 ft)
- Odyssey Peak – 1,821 m (5,974 ft)
- Mount Foweraker – 1,804 m (5,919 ft)
- Walter Peak – 1,800 m (5,900 ft)
- Mount Arthur – 1,795 m (5,889 ft)
- Coronation Peak– 1,769 m (5,804 ft)
- Mount Hikurangi (Gisborne District) – 1,754 m (5,755 ft) (highest peak in the North Island, excluding volcanoes)
- Ben Lomond – 1,751 m (5,745 ft)
- Mount Peel – 1,743 m (5,719 ft)
- Mount Mangaweka – 1,730 m (5,680 ft) (second highest peak in the North Island, excluding volcanoes)
- Kaweka J (Kaweka Range) – 1,724 m (5,656 ft)
- Mount Axford – 1,720 m (5,640 ft)
- Mount Williams – 1,718 m (5,636 ft)
- Brown Peak, Sturge Island (subantarctic island) – 1,705 m (5,594 ft) or 1,524 m (5,000 ft)
- Mount Winterslow – 1,700 m (5,600 ft)
- Mitre Peak – 1,692 m (5,551 ft)
- Mount Somers / Te Kiekie – 1,688 m (5,538 ft)
- Purple Hill (Lake Pearson, above Waimakariri Valley) – 1,680 m (5,510 ft)
- Mount Pisgah – 1,643 m (5,390 ft) (highest peak of the Kakanui Range)
- Roys Peak – 1,578 m (5,177 ft)
- The Mitre (Tararua Range) – 1,571 m (5,154 ft)
- Mount Hector (Tararua Range) – 1,529 m (5,016 ft)
- Angle Knob (Tararua Range) – 1,510 m (4,950 ft)
- Hauhungatahi – 1,521 m (4,990 ft)
- Mount Danae – 1,495 m (4,905 ft)
- Mount Lyndon – 1,489 m (4,885 ft)
- Mid Dome – 1,478 m (4,849 ft)
- Mount Luxmore – 1,472 m (4,829 ft)
- Mount Holdsworth (Tararua Range) – 1,470 m (4,820 ft)
- The Cairn (Benmore Range) – 1,464 m (4,803 ft)
- Summit Peak – 1,450 m (4,760 ft) (highest point of the Rock and Pillar Range)
- Mount Philipps – 1,446 m (4,744 ft)
- Mount Arowhana – 1,439 m (4,721 ft)
- Jumbo Peak (Tararua Range) – 1,405 m (4,610 ft)
- Pouākai (Pouākai Range) – 1,400 m (4,600 ft)
- Mount Alfred – 1,375 m (4,511 ft)
- Mount Oxford – 1,364 m (4,475 ft)
- Young Island (subantarctic island) – 1,340 m (4,400 ft)
- Mount Isobel (Hanmer, South Island) – 1,324 m (4,344 ft)
- The Buscot (Benmore Range) – 1,245 m (4,085 ft)
- Buckle Island (subantarctic island) – 1,239 m (4,065 ft)
- Mount Noble – 1,220 m (4,000 ft)
- Mount Te Kinga – 1,204 m (3,950 ft)
- Mount Grono (Secretary Island) – 1,196 m (3,924 ft) (highest peak in main New Zealand chain not in the North or South Island)
- Mount Pureora – 1,175 m (3,855 ft)
- Mount Tarawera – 1,111 m (3,645 ft)
- Mount Tauhara – 1,088 m (3,570 ft)
- Mount Studholme – 1,086 m (3,563 ft)
- Mount John – 1,031 m (3,383 ft) (site of Mount John University Observatory)
- Mount Thomas – 1,023 m (3,356 ft)

=== Under 1,000 metres ===
- Mount Ross – 983 m (3,225 ft) (highest point in the Aorangi Range)
- Mount Anglem / Hananui – 979 m (3,212 ft) (highest peak on Stewart Island / Rakiura)
- Mount Pirongia – 959 m (3,146 ft)
- Mount Te Aroha – 952 m (3,123 ft) (highest point in the Kaimai Range)
- Mount Matthews – 940 m (3,080 ft) (highest peak in Rimutaka Range)
- Mount Herbert (Te Ahu Patiki) – 920 m (3,020 ft) (highest point on Banks Peninsula)
- Wharite Peak – 920 m (3,020 ft)
- Queenstown Hill – 907 m (2,976 ft)
- Maungatua – 900 m (3,000 ft)
- Moehau – 892 m (2,927 ft) (highest point on the Coromandel Peninsula)
- Mount Graham – 829 m (2,720 ft)
- Putauaki (Mount Edgecumbe) – 820 m (2,690 ft)
- Maungatautari – 797 m (2,615 ft) (site of the Maungatautari Restoration Project)
- Te Raupua – 781 m (2,562 ft) (highest point in Northland)
- Tutamoe – 770 m (2,530 ft) (second highest point in Northland)
- Tākaka Hill – 760 m (2,490 ft)
- Ngongotahā – 757 m (2,484 ft)
- Mount Karioi – 756 m (2,480 ft) (overlooks Raglan)
- Swampy Summit – 739 m (2,425 ft) (highest remnant of the Dunedin Volcano)
- Mount Hauturu on Little Barrier Island – 722 m (2,369 ft) (highest point in the Auckland Region)
- Mount Wainui – 722 m (2,369 ft) (highest peak in Akatarawa Forest)
- Mount Pye – 720 m (2,360 ft) (highest point in The Catlins)
- Mount McKerrow – 706 m (2,316 ft)
- Mount Dick – 705 m (2,313 ft) (highest point in the Auckland Islands, on Adams Island)
- Kohukohunui (highest point in the Hunua Ranges) – 688 m (2,257 ft)
- Patuha (New Zealand) (highest point in the Kaitake Range) – 684 m (2,244 ft)
- Mount Cargill – 680 m (2,230 ft)
- Flagstaff (Dunedin) – 666 m (2,185 ft)
- Mount Clime – 665 m (2,182 ft)
- Kahurānaki – 645 m (2,116 ft) Hawkes Bay Region
- Mount Hikurangi (Northland) – 625 m (2,051 ft)
- Mount Hobson (highest point on Great Barrier Island) – 621 m (2,037 ft)
- Hokonui Hills – 600 m (2,000 ft)
- Mount Honey (Campbell Island) – 558 m (1,831 ft)
- Mount Karangahake (Hauraki District – 544 m (1,785 ft)
- Castle Rock in the Coromandel Range – 525 metres (1,722 ft)
- Moumoukai – 516 m (1,693 ft) (highest point in the Kermadec Islands, on Raoul Island)
- Hawkins Hill, Wellington – 495 m (1,624 ft)
- Te Heru o Kahukura / Sugarloaf (Christchurch) – 494 m (1,621 ft)
- Kohinurākau (Hastings) – 490 m (1,610 ft)
- Te Toiokawharu (highest point in the Waitākere Ranges) – 474 m (1,555 ft)
- Saddle Hill (Dunedin) – 473 m (1,552 ft)
- Rangituhi / Colonial Knob (Porirua, Wellington) – 468 m (1,535 ft)
- Kakepuku (Waikato, North Island) – 449 m (1,473 ft)
- Mount Kaukau (Wellington) – 445 m (1,460 ft)
- Ruaotuwhenua (Waitākere Ranges, Auckland) – 440 m (1,440 ft)
- Mount Charles – 408 m (1,339 ft) (highest point on the Otago Peninsula)
- Mount Manaia (Whangarei) – 403 m (1,322 ft)
- Te Mata Peak (Hastings) – 399 m (1,309 ft)
- Signal Hill (Dunedin) – 393 m (1,289 ft)
- Mayor Island / Tuhua – 355 m (1,165 ft)
- Pukematekeo (Waitākere Ranges, Auckland) – 336 m (1,102 ft)
- Whakaari / White Island – 321 m (1,053 ft)
- Taumatawhakatangihangakoauauotamateaturipukakapikimaungahoronukupokaiwhenuakitanatahu – 305 m (1,001 ft)
- Te Ahumairangi – 301 m (988 ft)
- Brooklyn Hill (Wellington) – 299 m (981 ft)
- Maungatere Hill – 294 m (965 ft) (highest named point in the Chatham Islands) (Note: An unnamed point to the southwest of Maungatere Hill rises to 299 m (981 ft).)
- Mangere – 286 m (938 ft) (highest point on Mangere Island)
- Bluff Hill / Motupohue ("The Bluff", Bluff, Southland) – 265 m (869 ft)
- Rangitoto Island – 260 m (850 ft)
- Maunganui (Waiheke Island) – 231 m (758 ft)
- Mount Maunganui – 230 m (750 ft)
- Mount Victoria (Wellington) – 196 m (643 ft)
- Maungawhau / Mount Eden (Auckland) – 196 m (643 ft)
- Maungakiekie / One Tree Hill (Auckland) – 182 m (597 ft)
- Paritutu (New Plymouth) – 156 m (512 ft)
- Mount Wellington (Auckland) – 137 m (449 ft)
- Mount Albert (Auckland) – 135 m (443 ft)
- Roys Hill (Hastings) – 134 m (440 ft)
- Mount Roskill (Auckland) – 110 m (360 ft)
- Māngere Mountain – 107 m (351 ft)
- Bluff Hill (Napier) – 101 m (331 ft)

== Historical perspective ==
Prior to the introduction of the metric system in New Zealand, the mountains regarded as tall were those over 10,000 ft (3,000 m). Lists of mountains or peaks by height have over the decades been published by the New Zealand government in its official yearbook. The 1920–21 edition was the first to contain a list of mountains and it had six of them at over 10,000 feet. (Note: The 1920 edition does not contain a list of mountains.)

1920–21 yearbook
Mountain	height (ft)
Cook	12,349
Tasman	11,467
Malte Brun	10,421
Sefton	10,390
Haidinger	10,178
De la Beche	10,058

This table remained the same in the two subsequent editions until 1924, when the secretary of the New Zealand Alpine Club had provided a fuller list of 16 mountains:

1924 yearbook († indicating new additions)
Mountain	height (ft)
Cook	12,349
Tasman	11,467
Dampier†	11,287
Silberhorn†	10,757
Lendenfeld†	10,456
David's Dome† (Note: In subsequent lists, Saint David's Dome is referred to as Mount Hicks)	10,443
Malte Brun	10,421
Teichelmann†	10,370
Sefton	10,354
Haast†	10,295
Elie de Beaumont†	10,200
Haidinger	10,178
Douglas Peak†	10,178
La Perouse†	10,101
De la Beche	10,058
The Minarets†	10,058

In the 1931 yearbook, Torres Peak was added to that list. Andy Anderson was the first to climb all 17 mountains by late December 1950.

The 1931 list remained unchanged until the late 1950s, and was used as the starting point by mountaineer Gordon Hasell (1933–2018) to compile an amended list. Not all the mountains had been officially surveyed and Hasell added 12 new ones to the list that he considered likely to also reach the 10,000 feet mark and deleted 2 (De la Beche and The Minarets), making a total of 27 peaks. This list was published in the 1957 edition of the New Zealand Alpine Journal and stood for the next 25 years. It is shown here as published in geographical order from north-east to south-west.

Hasell's 1957 list († indicating new additions)
Peak	height as published (ft)
West Peak of Elie de Beaumont†	10,027
Elie de Beaumont	10,200
East Minaret	10,058
West Minaret†	10,022
Malte Brun	10,421
Douglas Peak	10,107
Mt. Haidinger, North Peak†	
Mt. Haidinger	10,059
Mt. Haast, High Peak†	10,295
Mt. Haast, Middle Peak†	
Mt. Haast, West Peak†	
Lendenfeld Peak	10,503
Mt. Tasman	11,475
Torres Peak	10,376
Silberhorn	10,757
Mt. Graham†	
Mt. Teichelmann	10,368
Mt. Magellan†	
Mt. Malaspina†	
Mt. Vancouver†	
Mt. Dampier	11,287
Mt. Cook, High Peak	12,349
Mt. Cook, Middle Peak†	12,173
Mt. Cook, Low Peak†	11,787
Mt. Hicks	10,443
La Perouse	10,101
Mt. Sefton	10,359
