= Mount Damfool =

Mountain in New Zealand

Highest point
- Elevation: 2,030 metres (6,660 ft)
- Coordinates: 43°01′05.9″S 171°26′24.4″E

Geography
- Location: South Island, New Zealand
- Parent range: Southern Alps

Mount Damfool is a mountain in the Southern Alps of New Zealand. It is a grade 1+ climb that can be completed in a long day from the Bealey Bridge via the Anti Crow River valley.

== See also ==
- List of mountains of New Zealand by height
