= Mount Moffat (New Zealand) =

Mountain in New Zealand

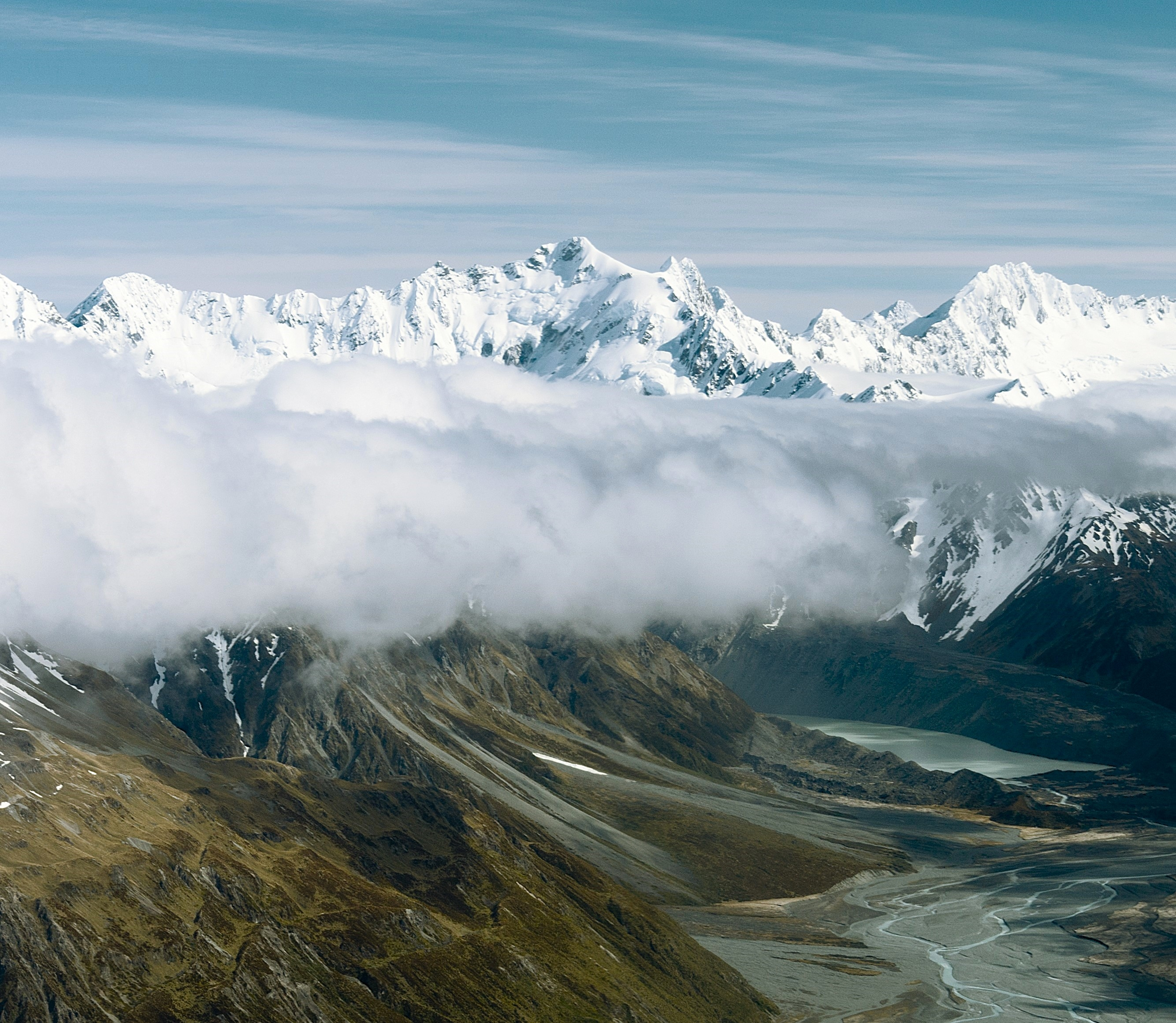
- South aspect, centred

Highest point
- Elevation: 2,638 m (8,655 ft)
- Prominence: 478 m (1,568 ft)
- Isolation: 4.46 km (2.77 mi)
- Listing: Highest mountains of New Zealand
- Coordinates: 43°27′41″S 170°27′20″E

Geography
- Location within New Zealand
- Interactive map of Mount Moffat
- Location: South Island
- Country: New Zealand
- Region: Canterbury / West Coast
- Protected area: Aoraki / Mount Cook National Park
- Parent range: Southern Alps
- Topo map(s): NZMS260 I35; Topo50 BX16

Climbing
- First ascent: 1933

Mount Moffat is a 2,638-metre-elevation (8,655-foot) mountain in the Canterbury Region of New Zealand.

== Description ==
Mount Moffat is situated on the crest or Main Divide of the Southern Alps and on the boundary of Aoraki / Mount Cook National Park. It is located 190 kilometres (118 mi) west of the city of Christchurch and set on the common boundary shared by the Canterbury and West Coast Regions of South Island. Precipitation runoff from the mountain drains northwest into the Butler River and southeast to the Godley River. Topographic relief is significant as the south face rises 1,640 metres (5,381 feet) in 2.5 kilometres. The nearest higher peak is Mount Mannering, four kilometres to the southwest. The first ascent of the summit was made in January 1933 by A.J. Scott, Alf Brustad, and Russell Fraser.

== Climbing ==
Climbing routes on Mount Moffat:

- South East Ridge – A.J. Scott, Alf Brustad, Russell Fraser – (1933)
- West Slope – Laurie Osborne, Bruce Waterhouse, John Harrison, B H (Snow) Williams – (1954)
- South West Ridge – John Nankervis, Phil Castle, Grant Stotter, Pat Thorn – (1978)

== Climate ==
Based on the Köppen climate classification, Mount Moffat is located in a marine west coast (Cfb) climate zone, with a tundra climate at the summit. Prevailing westerly winds blow moist air from the Tasman Sea onto the mountains, where the air is forced upward by the mountains (orographic lift), causing moisture to drop in the form of rain or snow. This climate supports the Gino Watkins, Grey, Elizabeth, Easter, and Sustins glaciers on this mountain's slopes. The months of December through February offer the most favourable weather for viewing or climbing this peak.

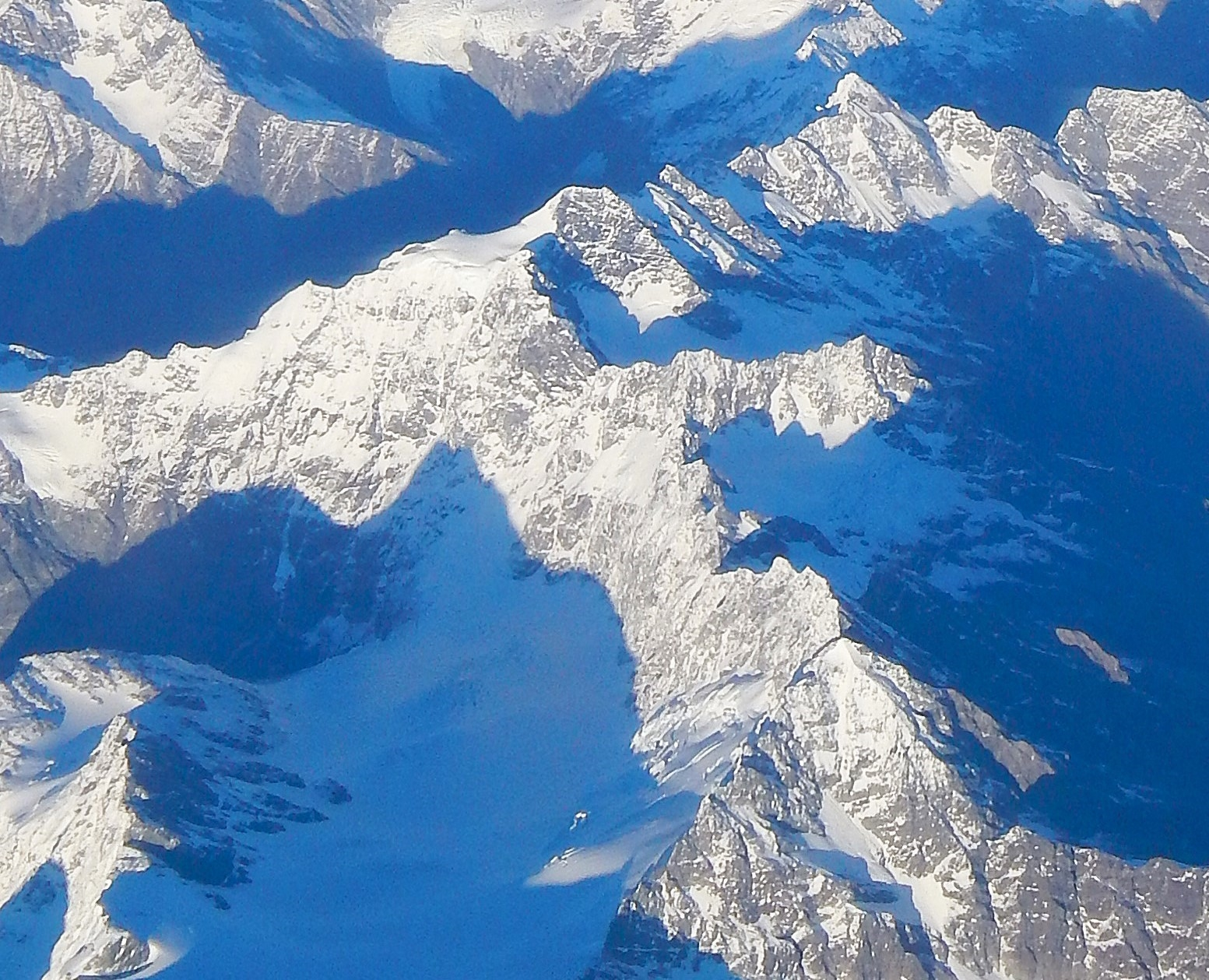
Mount Moffat centred, aerial from northeast

== See also ==
- List of mountains of New Zealand by height
