= Mount Hamilton (New Zealand) =

Mountain in New Zealand

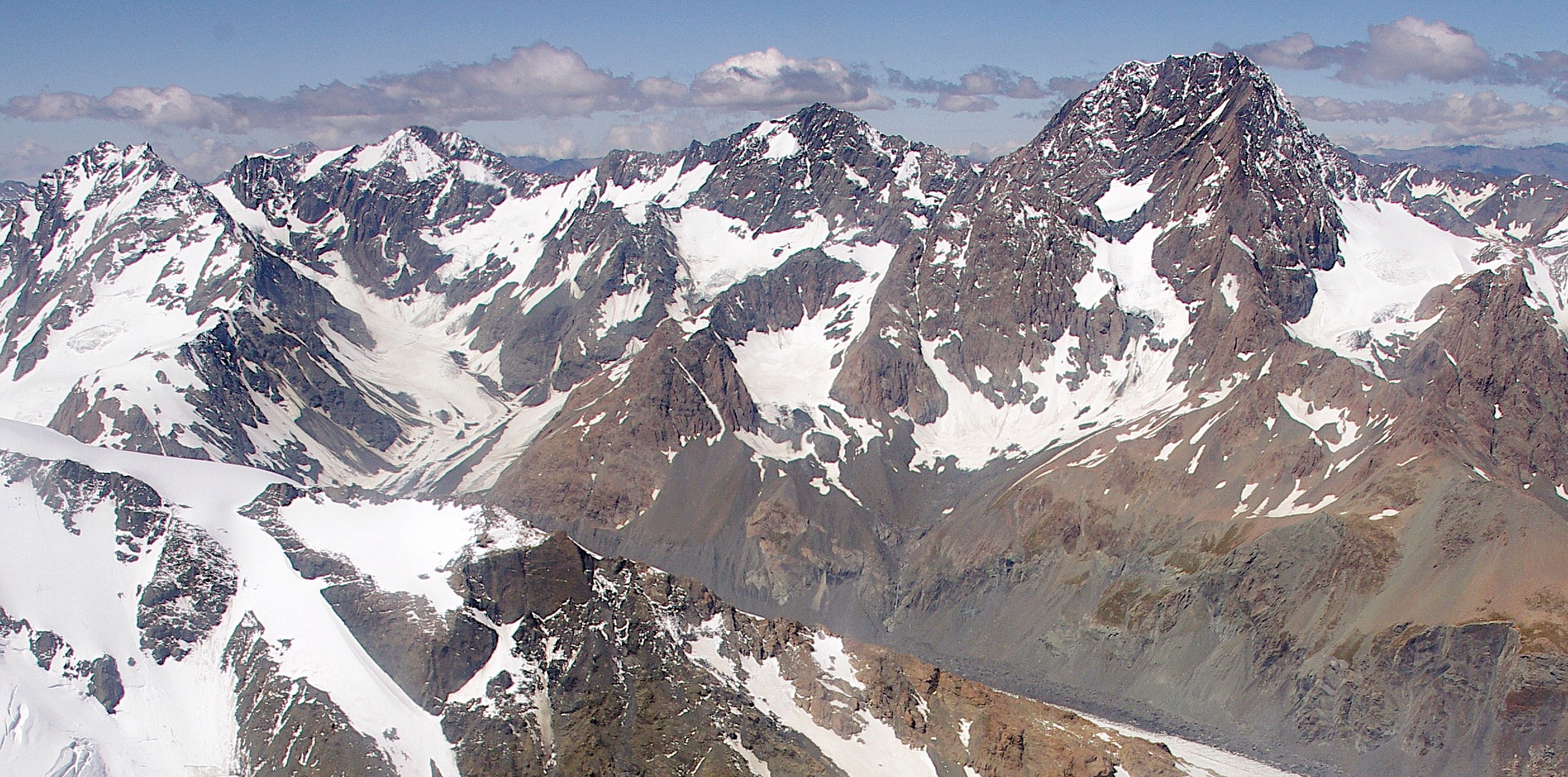
- Mount Hamilton centred (Malte Brun to right)

Highest point
- Elevation: 3,025 m (9,925 ft)
- Prominence: 345 m (1,132 ft)
- Listing: New Zealand #10
- Coordinates: 43°33′17″S 170°19′46″E

Geography
- Location within New Zealand
- Location: South Island, New Zealand
- Parent range: Southern Alps

Mount Hamilton is a 3,025 metres (9,925 ft) mountain of the Southern Alps, located in the South Island of New Zealand.

== Geography ==
Mount Hamilton rises within the Malte Brun Range just a few kilometers northeast of the eponymous 3,199 m (10,495 ft) high Malte Brun. Apart from this, it is the only three-thousander in the range. The mountain is glaciated, for example the Wheeler Glacier lies on its southeast flank.

== History ==
Mount Hamilton was named by Noel Brodrick, after a Sydney man who climbed in this part of the New Zealand Alps in the 1890s. Today it is part of the Aoraki / Mount Cook National Park.

== Geology ==
The rock consists primarily of variants of sedimentary rocks of sandstone and mudstone. Basalt, limestone and chert also occur. The age of the mountain is estimated between 201 and 273 million years.
