= Mount Wolseley =

Mountain in New Zealand

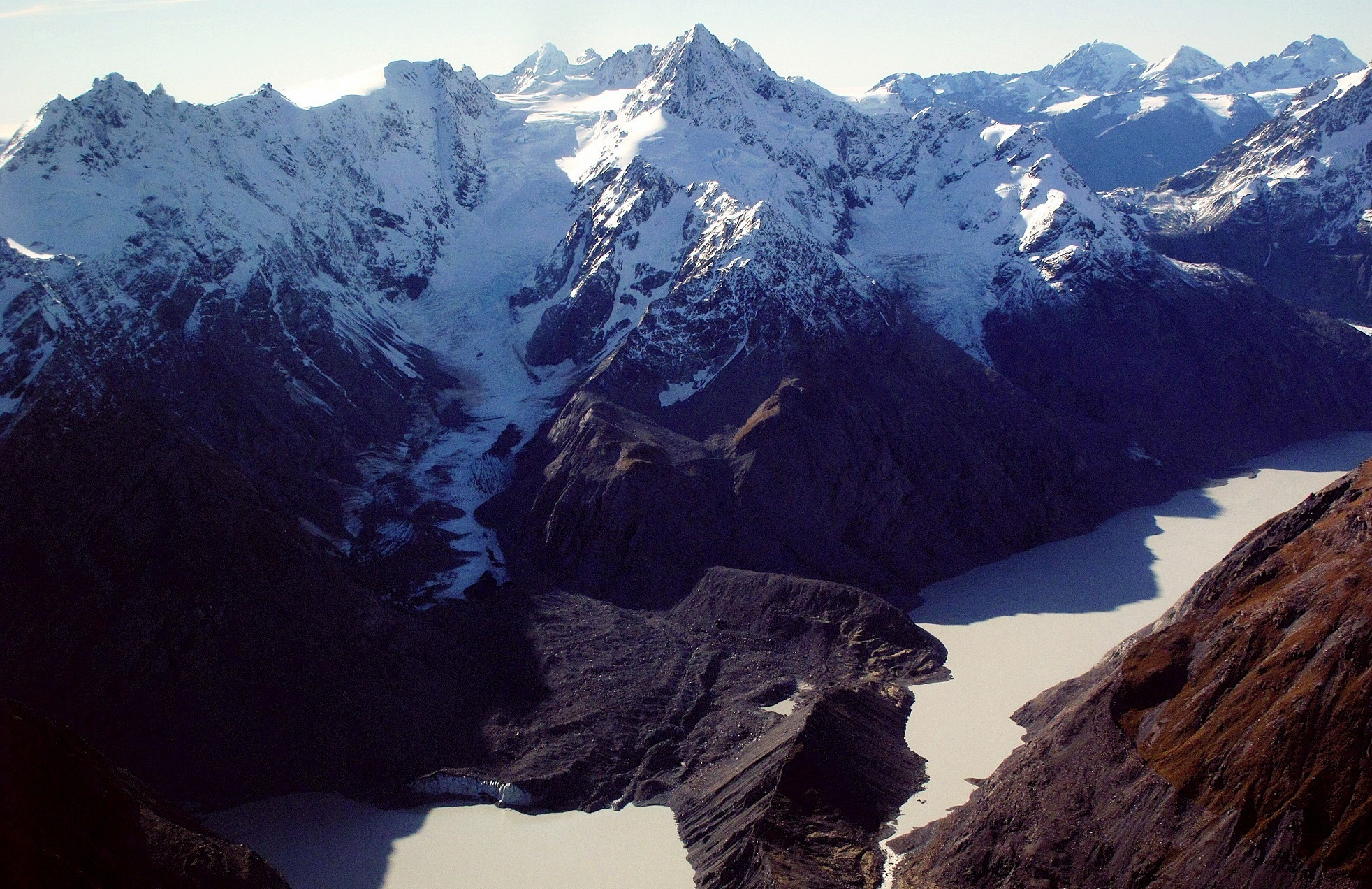
- South aspect, centred at top

Highest point
- Elevation: 2,558 m (8,392 ft)
- Prominence: 305 m (1,001 ft)
- Isolation: 3.89 km (2.42 mi)
- Listing: Highest mountains of New Zealand
- Coordinates: 43°25′46″S 170°31′23″E

Geography
- Location within New Zealand
- Interactive map of Mount Wolseley
- Location: South Island
- Country: New Zealand
- Region: Canterbury
- Protected area: Aoraki / Mount Cook National Park
- Parent range: Southern Alps
- Topo map: NZMS260 I35

Climbing
- First ascent: December 1920

Mount Wolseley is a 2,558-metre-elevation (8,392-foot) mountain in the Canterbury Region of New Zealand.

== Description ==
Mount Wolseley is situated less than one kilometre east of the crest of the Southern Alps in Aoraki / Mount Cook National Park. It is located 185 kilometres (115 mi) west of the city of Christchurch in the Mackenzie District of the Canterbury Region in the South Island. Precipitation runoff from the mountain drains into headwaters of the Godley River. Topographic relief is significant as the summit rises 1,460 metres (4,790 feet) in two kilometres. The first ascent of the summit was made in December 1920 by Will Kennedy and Jack Lippe. The nearest higher peak is Mount Loughnan, three kilometres to the west.

== Climbing ==
Climbing routes on Mount Wolseley:

- Neish Glacier – Will Kennedy, Jack Lippe – (1920)
- South Ridge – B.R. Young, I.R. Wood, H. Elder, J. Porter – (1951)
- East Ridge – Richard Tornquist, Noel Strack – (1953)

== Climate ==
Based on the Köppen climate classification, Mount Wolseley is located in a marine west coast (Cfb) climate zone, with a tundra climate at the summit. Prevailing westerly winds blow moist air from the Tasman Sea onto the mountains, where the air is forced upward by the mountains (orographic lift), causing moisture to drop in the form of rain or snow. This climate supports the Maud and Ruth glaciers on this mountain's slopes. The months of December through February offer the most favourable weather for viewing or climbing this peak.

== See also ==
- List of mountains of New Zealand by height
- Garnet Wolseley, 1st Viscount Wolseley
