= Mount Blackburn (New Zealand) =

Mountain in New Zealand

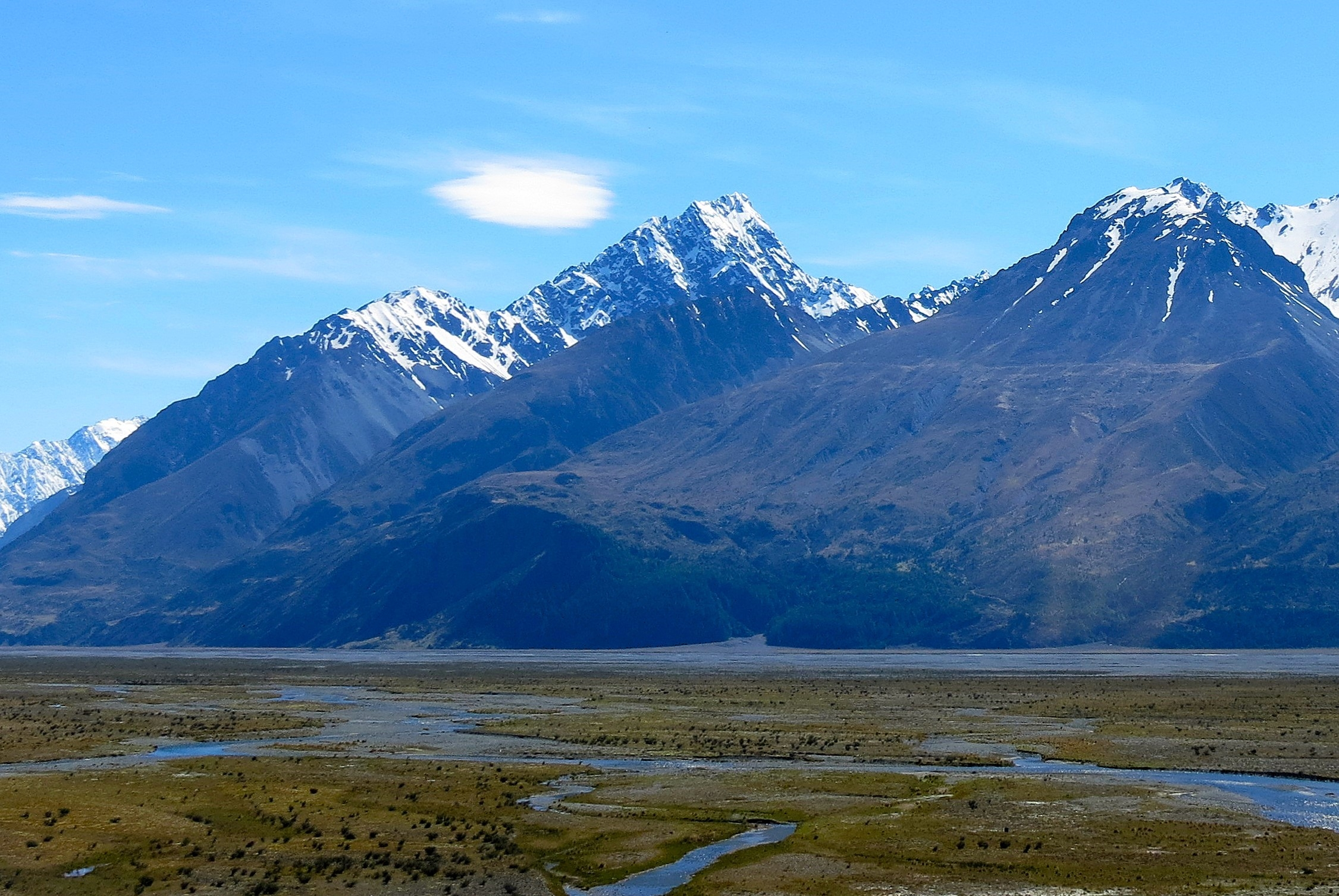
- South aspect, centred

Highest point
- Elevation: 2,409 m (7,904 ft)
- Prominence: 468 m (1,535 ft)
- Isolation: 7.07 km (4.39 mi)
- Listing: Highest mountains of New Zealand
- Coordinates: 43°45′21″S 170°12′06″E

Geography
- Location within New Zealand
- Interactive map of Mount Blackburn
- Location: South Island
- Country: New Zealand
- Region: Canterbury
- Parent range: Southern Alps; Burnett Mountains
- Topo map: NZMS260 H36

Climbing
- First ascent: March 1903

Mount Blackburn, also known as Rotten Tommy, is a 2,409-metre-elevation (7,904-foot) mountain in the Canterbury Region of New Zealand.

== Description ==
Mount Blackburn is set in the Burnett Mountains of the Southern Alps and is situated in the Canterbury Region of South Island. This peak is located seven kilometres (4.3 mi) east of Mount Cook Village and can be seen from Mount Cook Road. Precipitation runoff from the mountain drains west to the Tasman River via Gorilla Stream and Chop Creek. Topographic relief is significant as the summit rises 1,750 metres (5,741 feet) above the Tasman River in three kilometres, and 1,100 metres (3,609 feet) above Chop Creek in one kilometre. The nearest higher peak is The Nuns Veil, seven kilometres to the north-northeast. The first ascent of the summit was made in 1903 by Jack Clarke, C.J. Bainbridge, and W.G. Tennant. This mountain was originally christened Mount Giant by Andrew Burnett in 1894.

== Climbing ==
Climbing routes with first ascents:

- Original Route – Clarke, Bainbridge, Tennant – (1903)
- Central Rib (South Face) – Jane Morris – (2012)
- McKinnon Route (North West Face) – Guy McKinnon – (2012)

== Climate ==
Based on the Köppen climate classification, Mount Blackburn is located in a marine west coast (Cfb) climate zone, with a subpolar oceanic climate (Cfc) at the summit. Prevailing westerly winds blow moist air from the Tasman Sea onto the mountains, where the air is forced upwards by the mountains (orographic lift), causing moisture to drop in the form of rain or snow. The months of December through February offer the most favourable weather for viewing or climbing this peak.

== Gallery ==
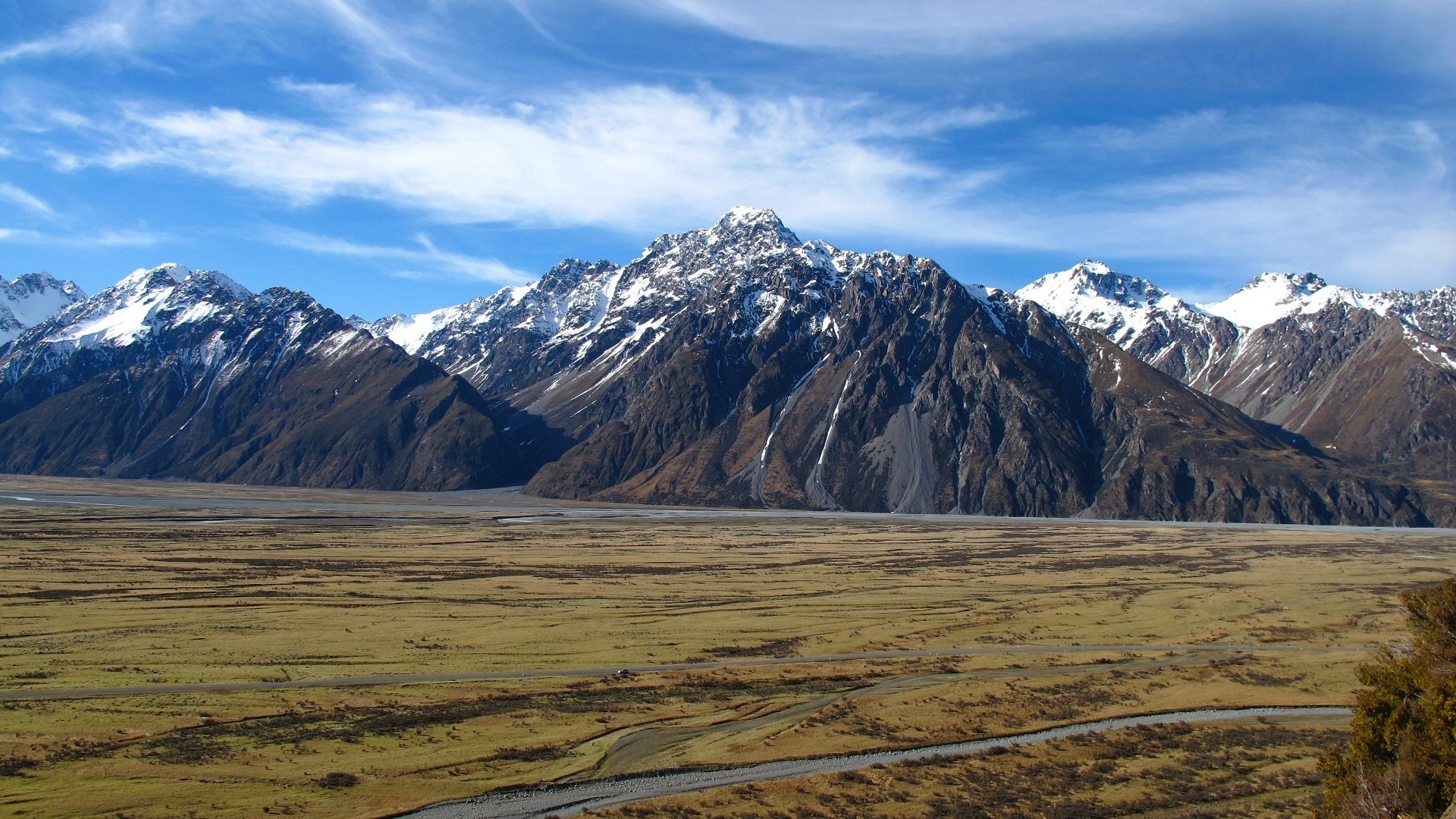
West aspect, centred

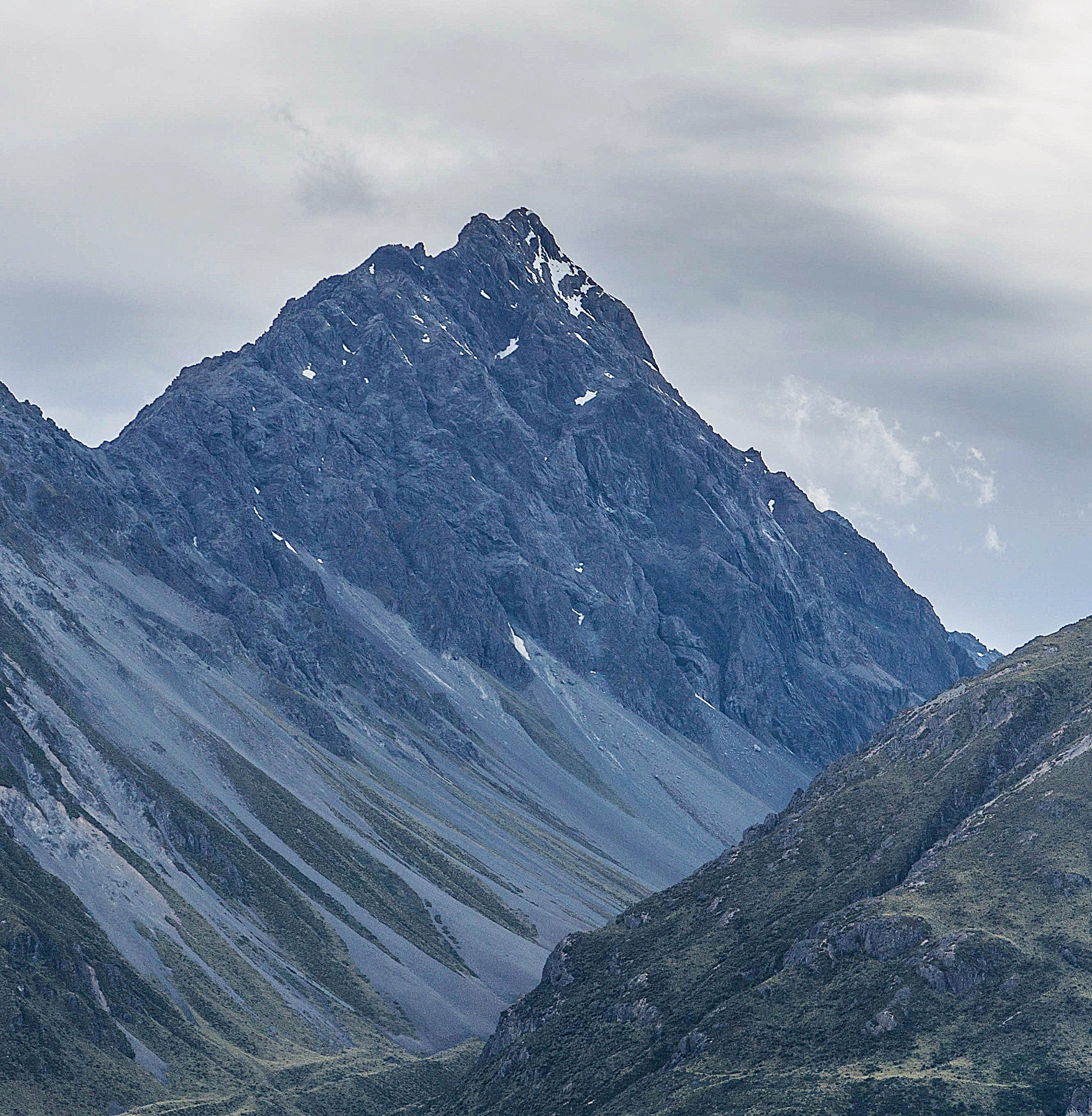
Southwest face

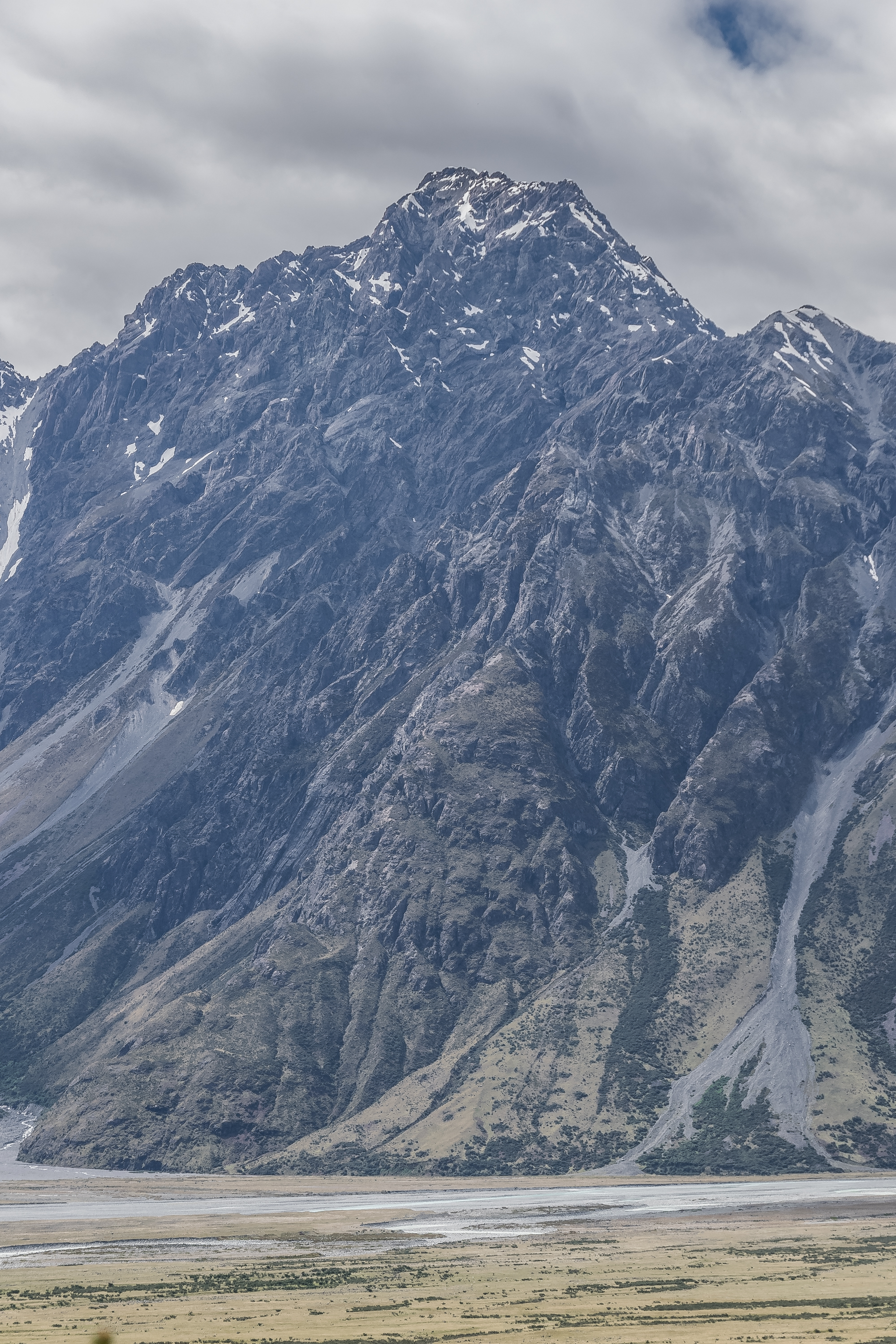
West aspect

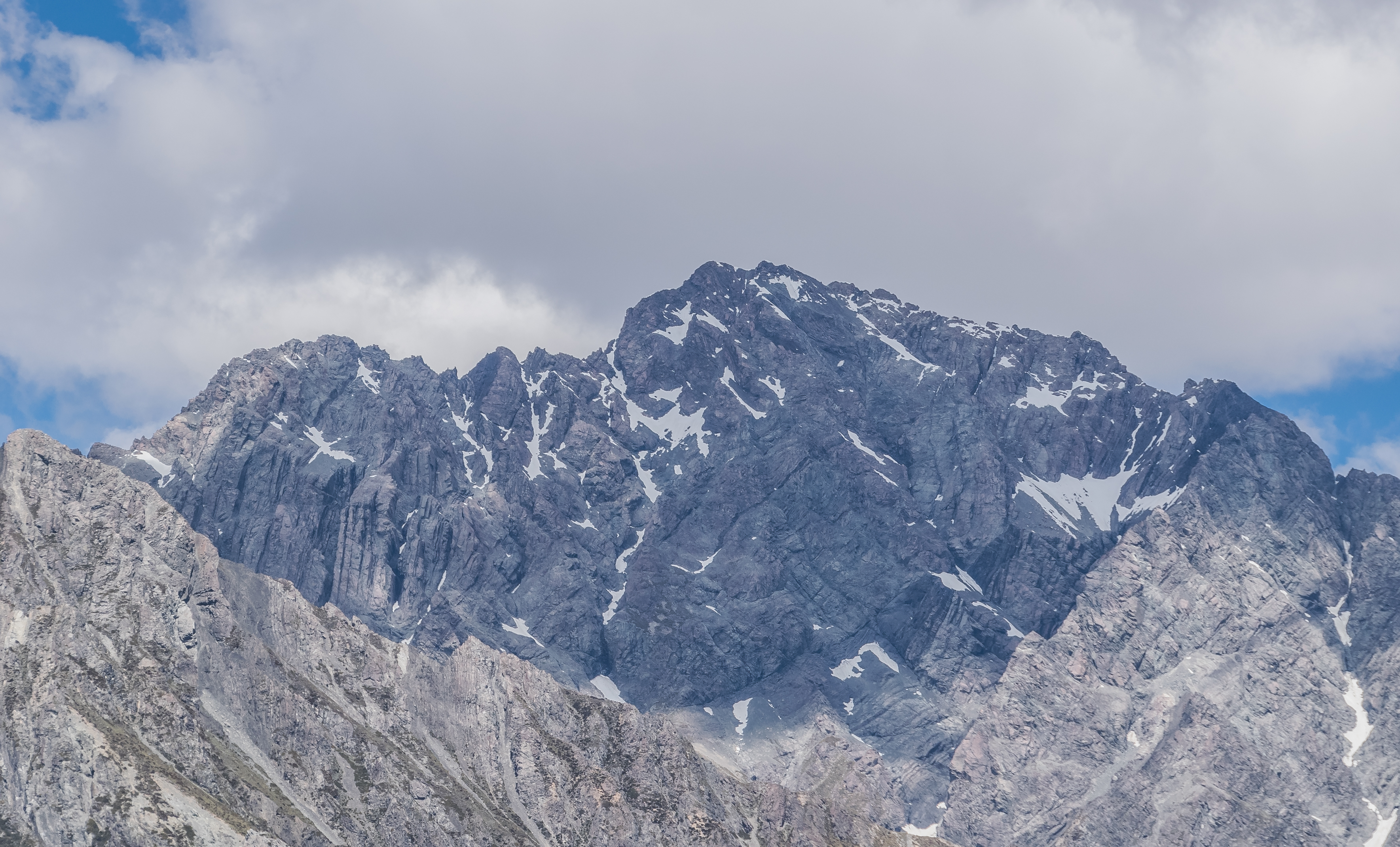
Northwest aspect

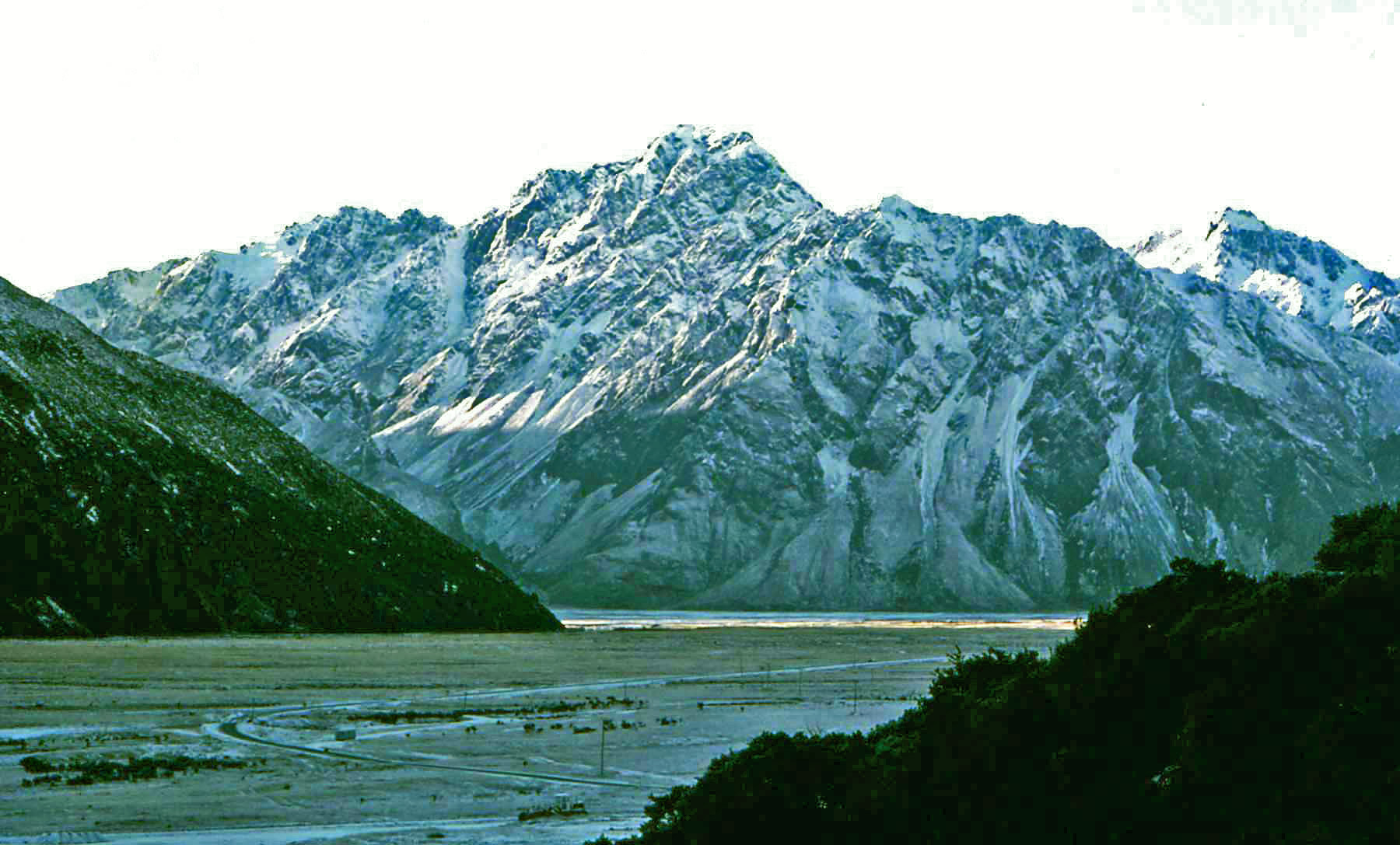

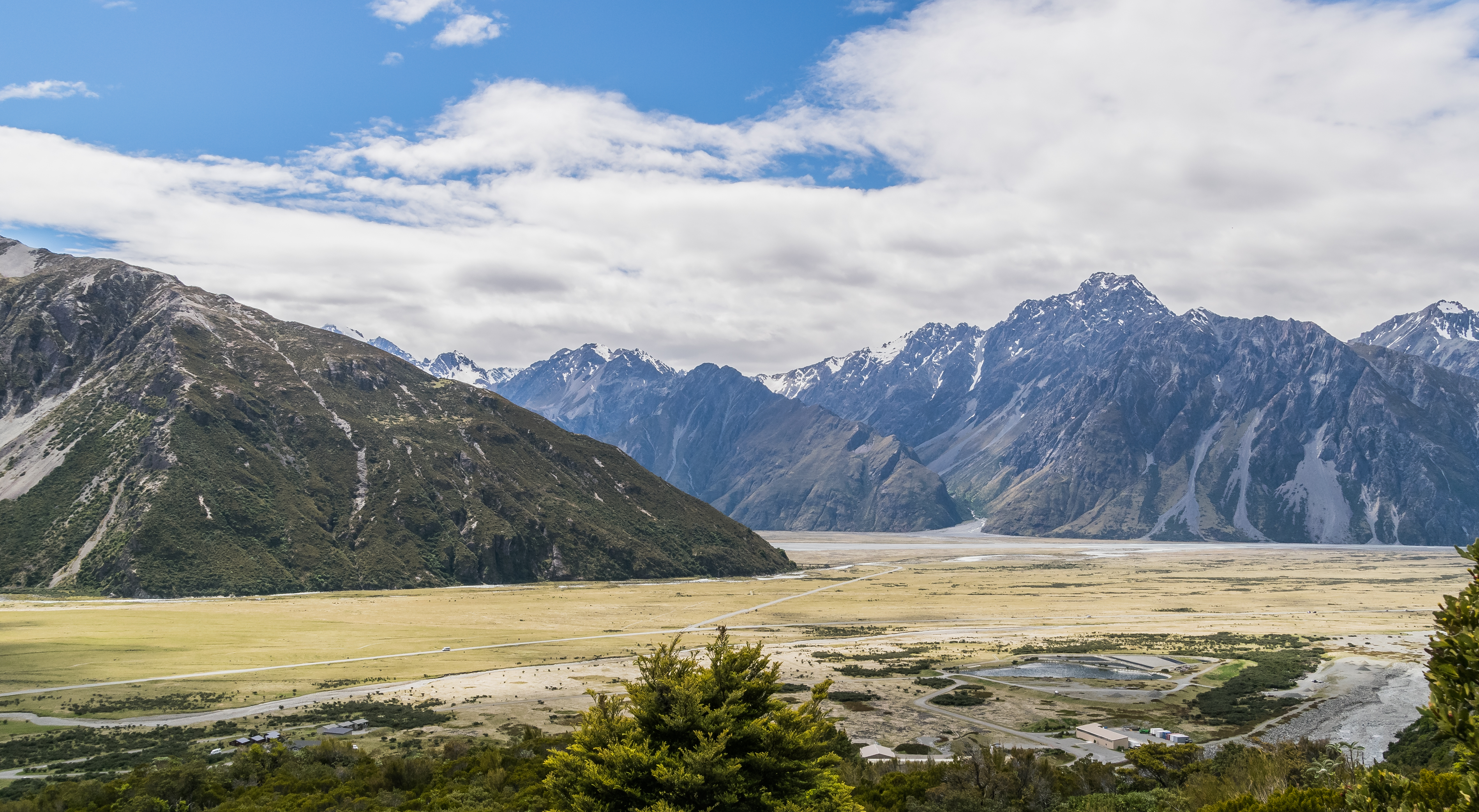

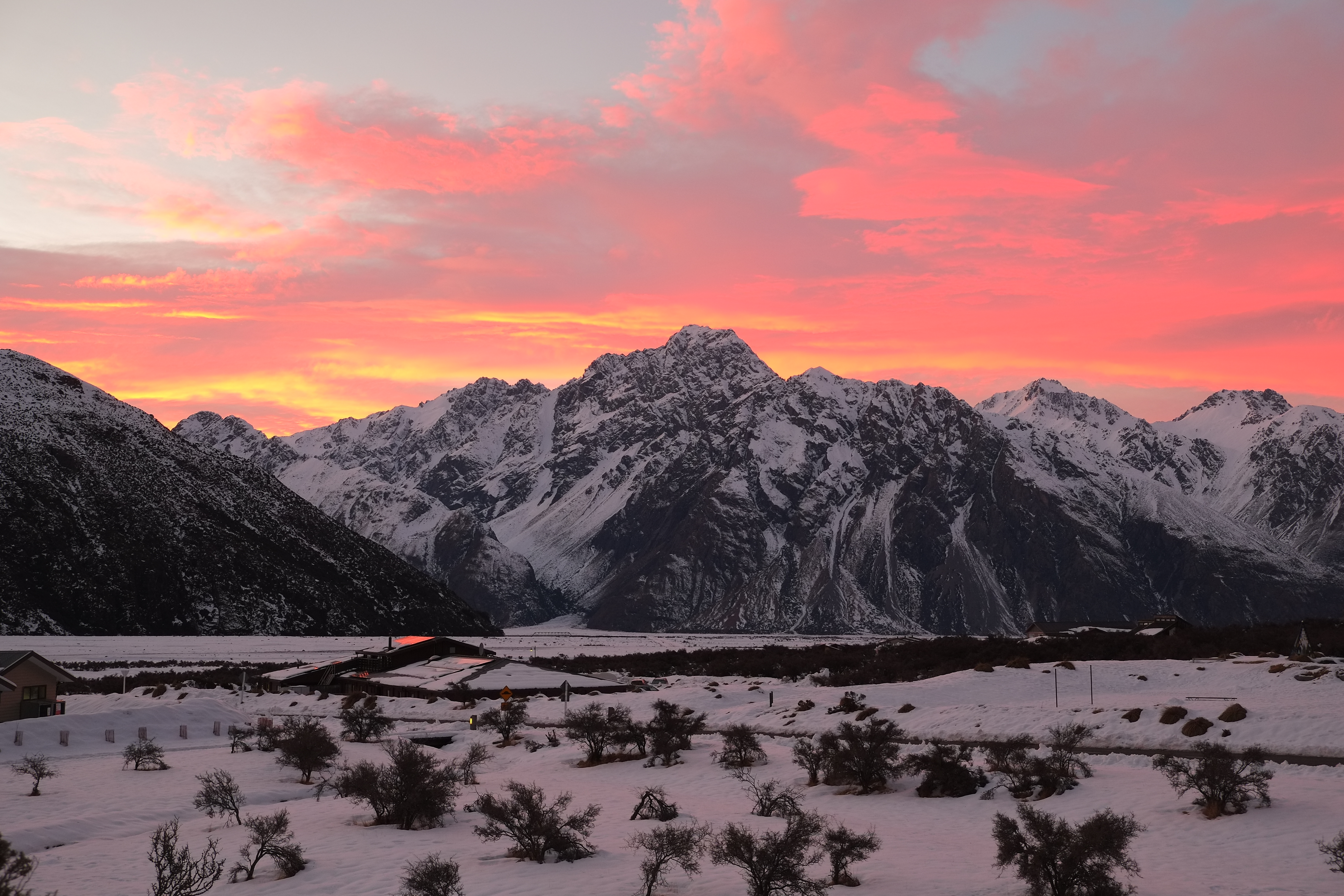

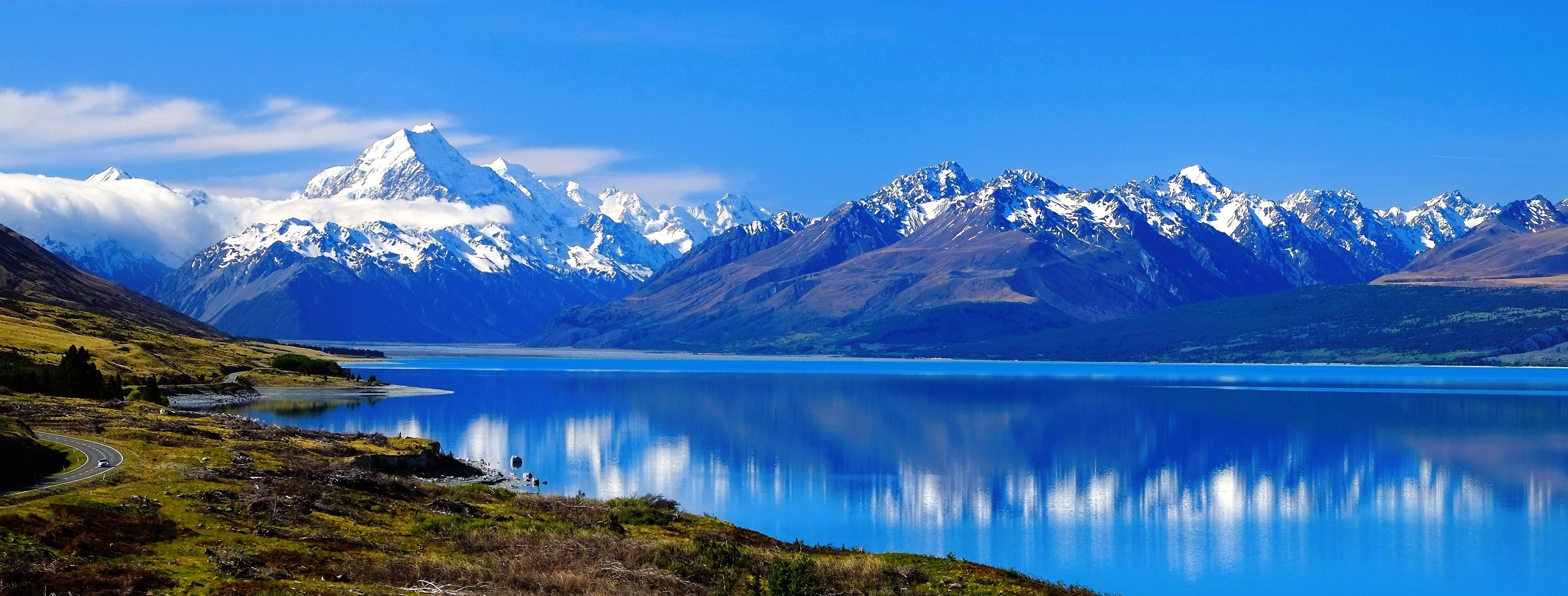
South aspect of Mount Blackburn right of centre, from Lake Pukaki

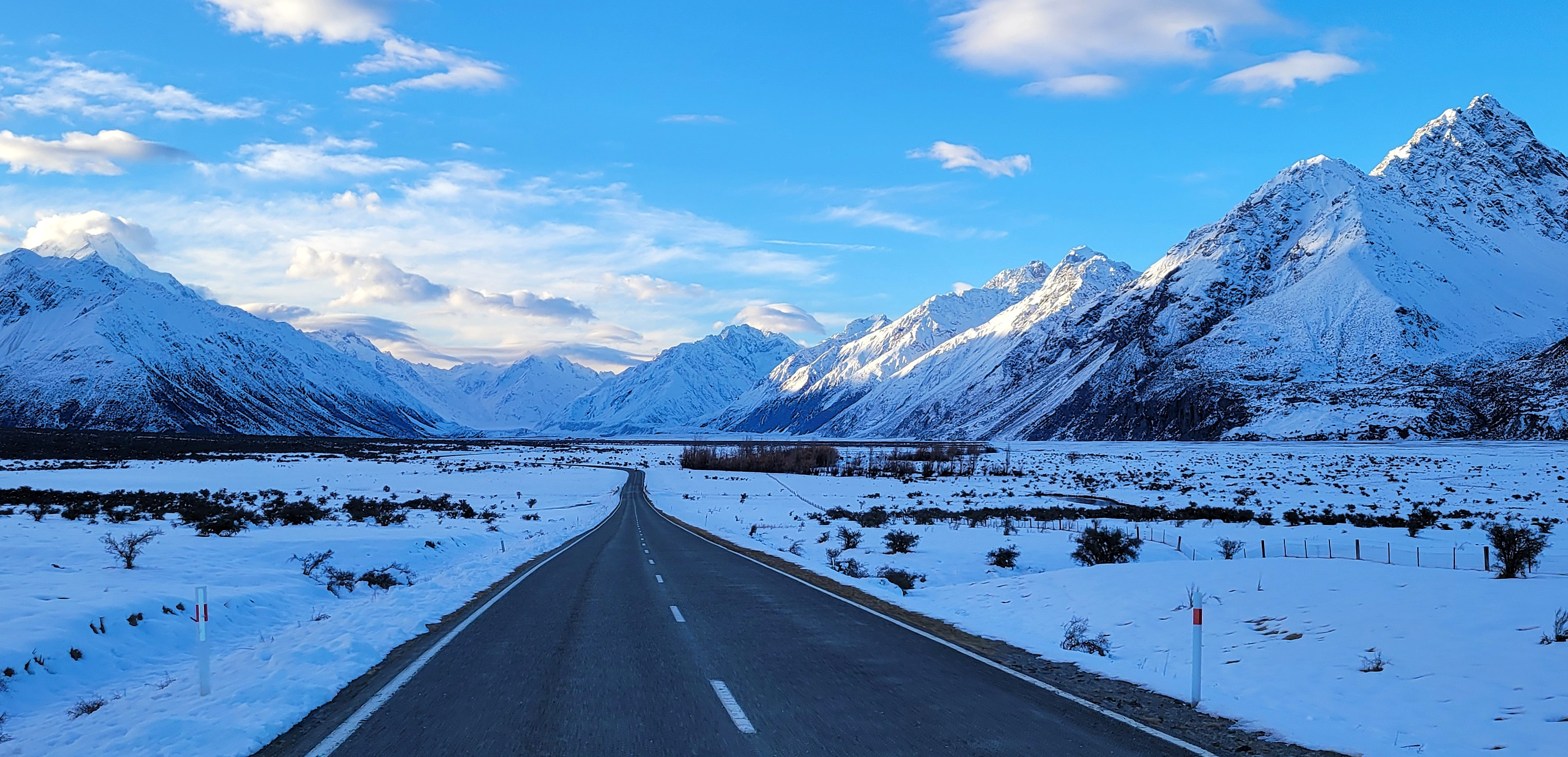
Mount Blackburn (far right) from Mount Cook Road

== See also ==
- List of mountains of New Zealand by height
