= Te ao Whekere =

Mountain in New Zealand

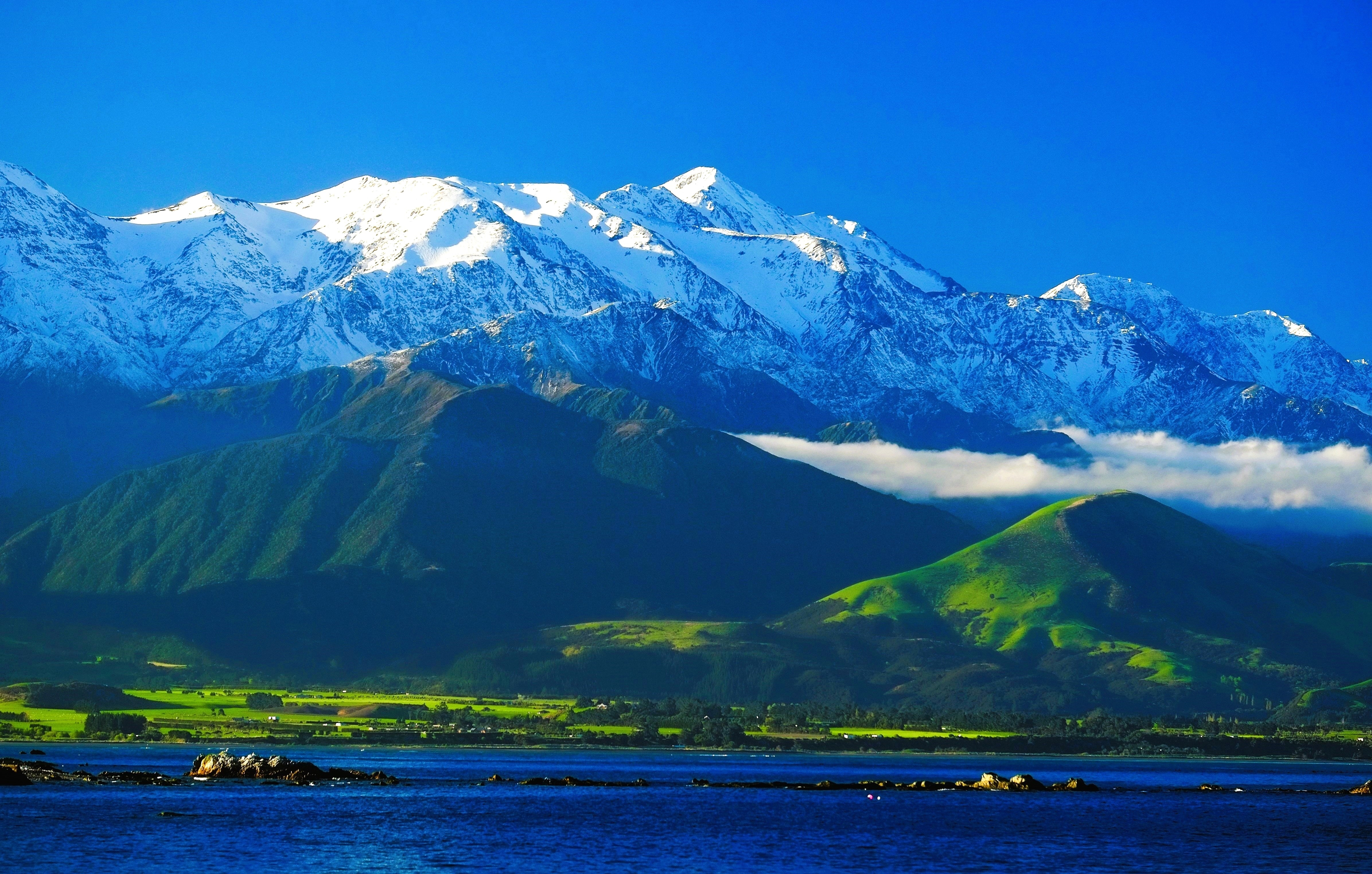
- Te ao Whekere from south at Kaikōura

Highest point
- Elevation: 2,590 m (8,497 ft)
- Prominence: 532 m (1,745 ft)
- Parent peak: Manakau
- Isolation: 7.72 km (4.80 mi)
- Listing: New Zealand #47
- Coordinates: 42.18554°S 173.694448°E

Geography
- Location within New Zealand
- Interactive map of Te ao Whekere
- Location: South Island
- Country: New Zealand
- Region: Canterbury
- Protected area: Ka Whata Tu O Rakihouia Conservation Park
- Parent range: Kaikōura Ranges
- Topo map(s): NZMS260 O30; Topo50 BT27

Te ao Whekere is a 2,590-metre-elevation (8,497-foot) mountain on the South Island of New Zealand.

== Description ==
Te ao Whekere is set in the Canterbury Region of the South Island. It is located 23 kilometres north of the town of Kaikōura where it ranks as the second-highest peak of the Seaward Kaikōura Range. Precipitation runoff from the mountain's slopes drains into tributaries of the Waiau Toa / Clarence River. Topographic relief is significant as the summit rises 1,270 metres (4,167 feet) above Happy Valley Stream in two kilometres. The nearest higher neighbour is Manakau, 7.72 kilometres to the southwest. One possible interpretation of the mountain's Māori name is a cloud that forms on the mountain indicating the presence of a northwest wind. Another meaning is "the gloomy cloud," or "the very dark cloud."

== Climate ==
Based on the Köppen climate classification, Te ao Whekere is located in a marine west coast climate zone (Cfb). Prevailing westerly winds blow moist air from the Tasman Sea onto the mountain, where the air is forced upwards by the mountains (orographic lift), causing moisture to drop in the form of rain and snow. The months of December through February offer the most favourable weather for viewing or climbing this peak.

== Climbing ==
Climbing routes:

- Jordan Stream Route
- Totaranui Route
- Happy Valley Route
- Haycock Ridge

== Gallery ==
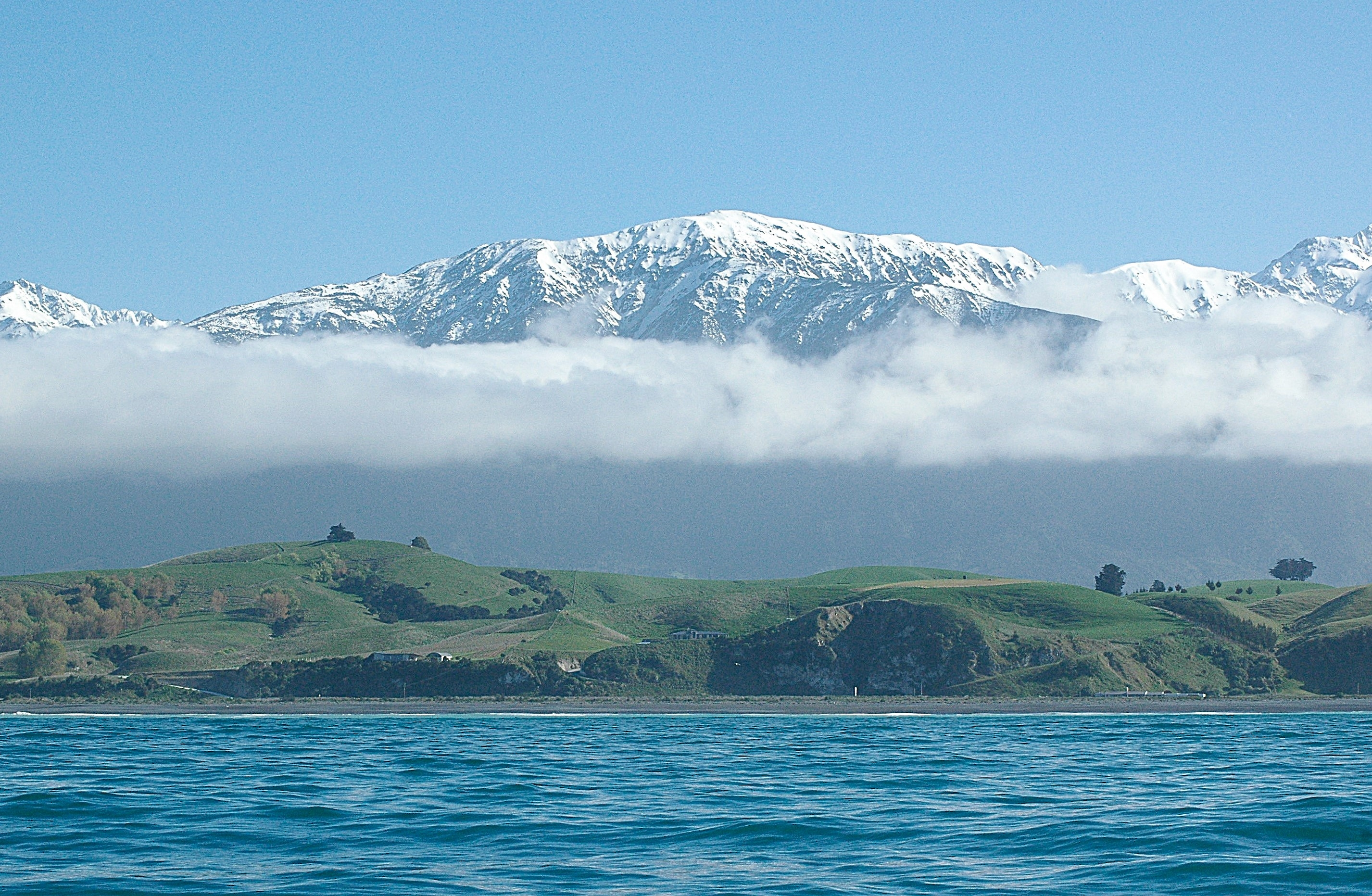
Te ao Whekere from east

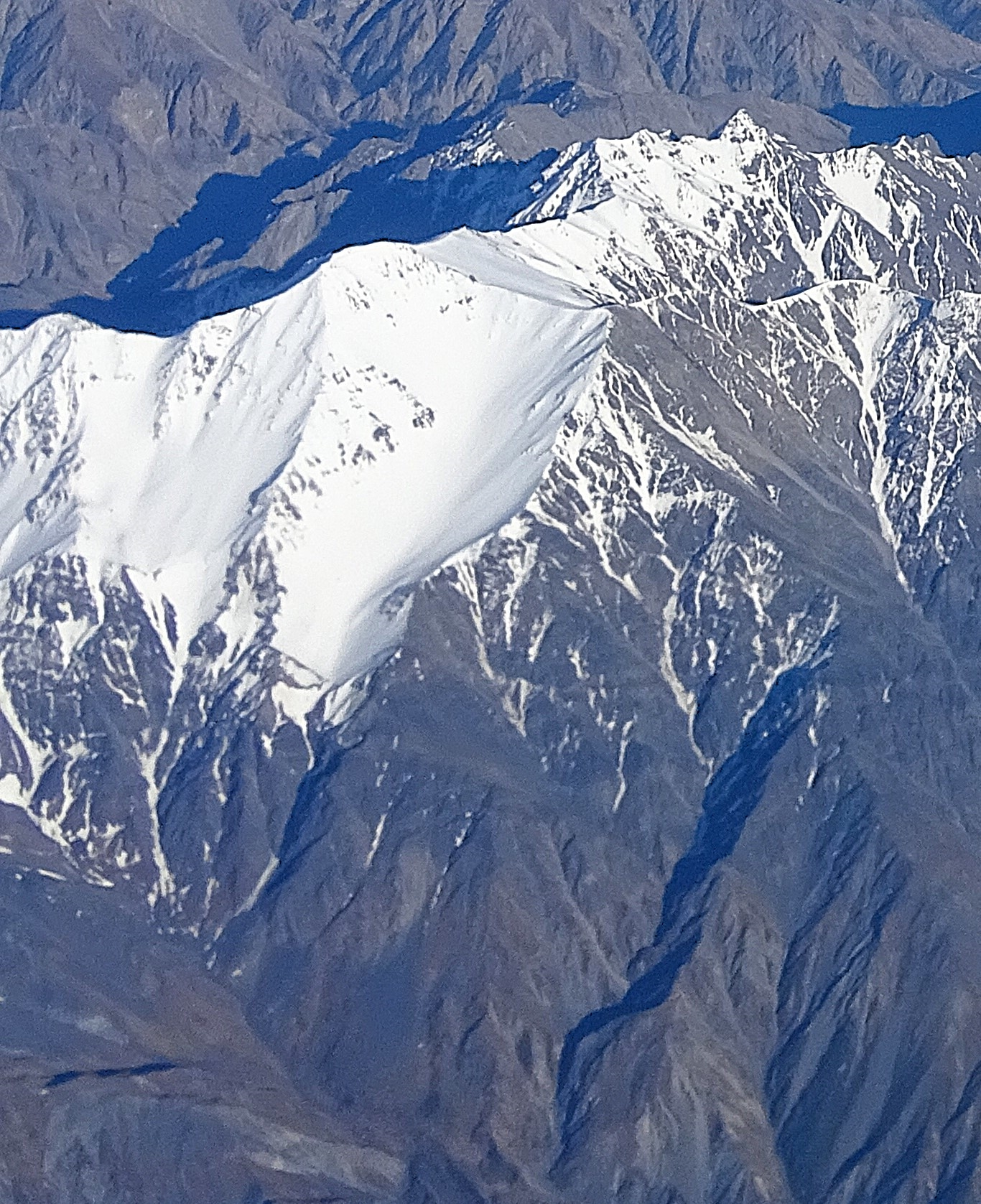
East aspect, from airliner

== See also ==
- List of mountains of New Zealand by height
