= Crow River (Canterbury) =

River in Arthur's Pass National Park, New Zealand

- Route of the Crow River
- Mouth of the Crow River Crow River (Canterbury) (South Island)

Location
- Country: New Zealand

Physical characteristics
- Source
  - location: Mount Rolleston
  - coordinates: 42°55′22″S 171°30′53″E
  - elevation: 1,270 m (4,170 ft)
- Mouth
  - location: Waimakariri River
  - coordinates: 42°59′19″S 171°30′48″E
  - elevation: 720 m (2,360 ft)
- Length: 8 km (5 mi)

Basin features
- Progression: Crow River → Waimakariri River → Pegasus Bay → Pacific Ocean

The Crow River is a river in Arthur's Pass National Park, Canterbury, New Zealand. It arises near Mount Rolleston and flows south into the Waimakariri River.

It was named after a South Island kōkako, sometimes called orange-wattled crow, which was seen in 1865 during an exploration of the area. The species was last seen in the 1930s and is probably extinct.

The New Zealand Department of Conservation maintains a tramping track alongside the river, and a backcountry hut is available for trampers.

== See also ==
- List of rivers of New Zealand
- Anti Crow River
