= Mount Symons =

Mountain in New Zealand

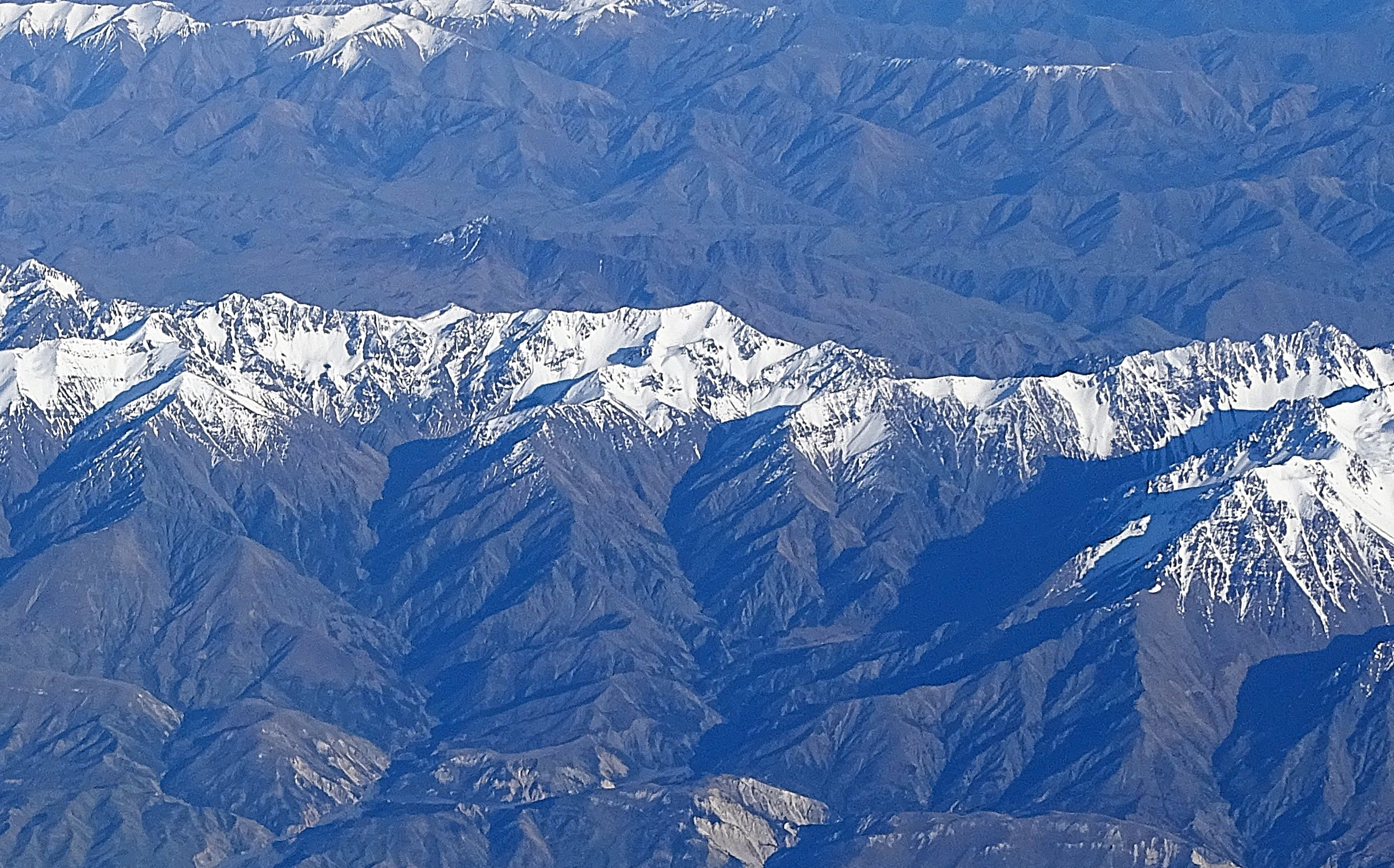
- East aspect, centred

Highest point
- Elevation: 2,408 m (7,900 ft)
- Prominence: 388 m (1,273 ft)
- Isolation: 4.56 km (2.83 mi)
- Listing: New Zealand #102
- Coordinates: 42.033°S 173.57°E

Geography
- Location within New Zealand
- Interactive map of Mount Symons
- Location: South Island
- Country: New Zealand
- Region: Canterbury / Marlborough
- Parent range: Kaikōura Ranges
- Topo map(s): NZMS260 O30; Topo50 BS27

Mount Symons is a 2,408-metre-elevation (7,900-foot) mountain in the South Island of New Zealand.

== Description ==
Mount Symons is set along the boundary shared by the Marlborough and Canterbury Regions of the South Island. It is located 40 kilometres north of the town of Kaikōura where it is part of the Inland Kaikōura Range. Precipitation runoff from the mountain drains south to the Waiau Toa / Clarence River and north to the Winterton River. Topographic relief is significant as the north face rises over 800 metres (2,625 feet) in approximately one kilometre. The nearest higher neighbour is Mitre Peak, 4.56 kilometres to the northeast. This mountain's toponym has been officially approved by the New Zealand Geographic Board.

== Climate ==
Based on the Köppen climate classification, Mount Symons is located in a marine west coast climate zone (Cfb). Prevailing westerly winds blow moist air from the Tasman Sea onto the mountain, where the air is forced upwards by the mountains (orographic lift), causing moisture to drop in the form of rain and snow. The months of December through February offer the most favourable weather for viewing or climbing this peak.

== See also ==
- List of mountains of New Zealand by height
