= Black Peak (New Zealand) =

Mountain in New Zealand

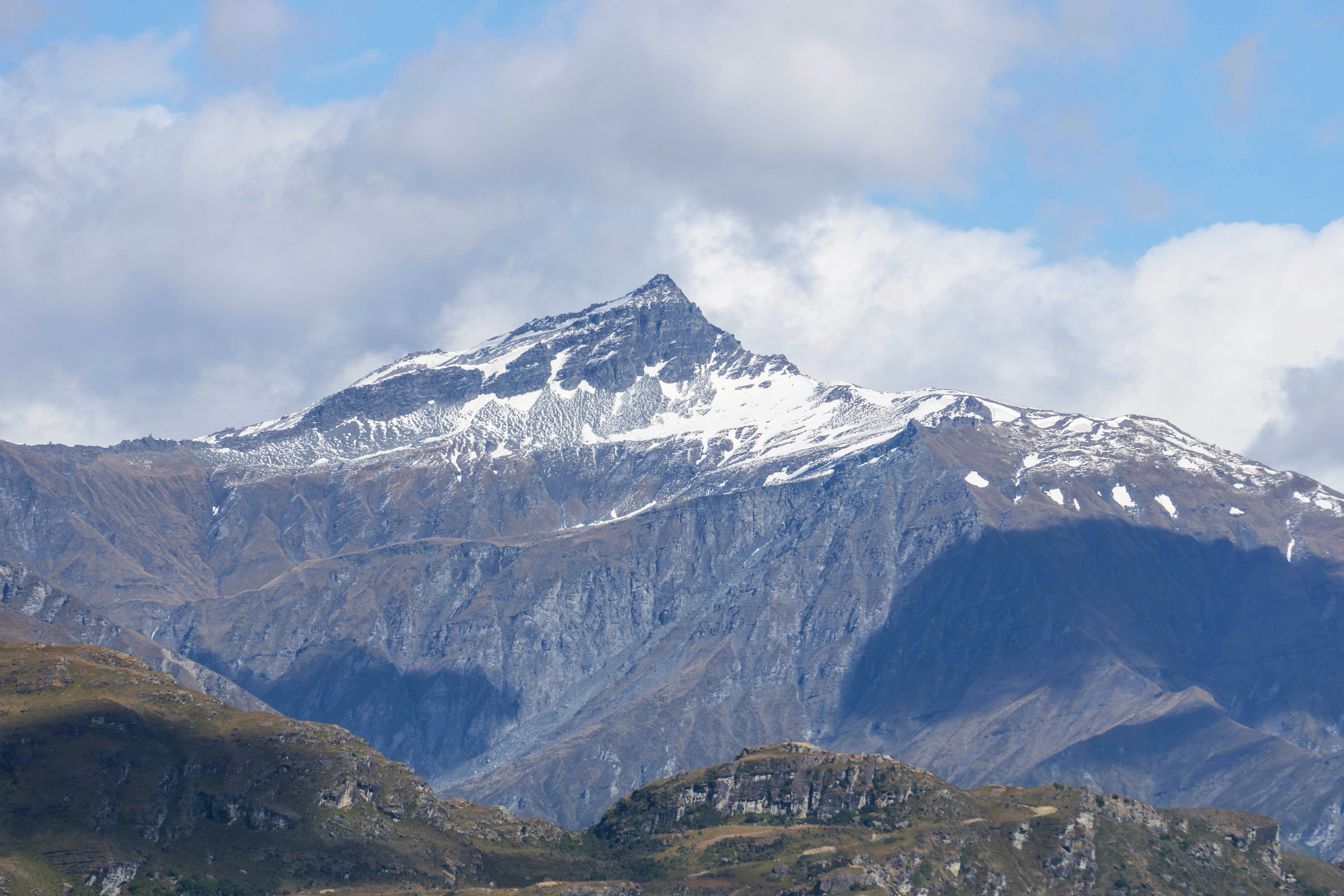
- East aspect

Highest point
- Elevation: 2,289 m (7,510 ft)
- Prominence: 840 m (2,756 ft)
- Isolation: 14.32 km (8.90 mi)
- Coordinates: 44°35′02″S 168°49′53″E

Geography
- Location within New Zealand
- Interactive map of Black Peak
- Location: South Island
- Country: New Zealand
- Region: Otago
- Parent range: Southern Alps; Harris Mountains
- Topo map(s): NZMS260 F40; Topo50 CA11

Black Peak is a 2,289-metre-elevation (7,510-foot) mountain in Otago, New Zealand.

== Description ==
Black Peak is the highest point of the Harris Mountains which are a subrange of the Southern Alps on the South Island. It is a prominent peak visible on the Wānaka skyline. Precipitation runoff from the mountain's south and west slopes drains to the Shotover River via Blue Creek and Polnoon Burn, whereas the north and east slopes drain into Phoebe Creek and Carmel Burn which are tributaries of the Matukituki River. Topographic relief is significant as the summit rises 1,400 metres (4,593 feet) above Polnoon Burn in four kilometres, and 2,000 metres (6,562 feet) above the Matukituki River Valley in five kilometres. The nearest higher peak is Mount Alta, 14 kilometres to the northeast. This mountain's descriptive toponym was applied by John Turnbull Thomson from the summit of Grandview Mountain, approximately 38 kilometres to the east. The toponym has appeared in publications since at least 1884.

== Climate ==
Based on the Köppen climate classification, Black Peak is located in a marine west coast (Cfb) climate zone, with a subpolar oceanic climate (Cfc) at the summit. Prevailing westerly winds blow moist air from the Tasman Sea onto the mountains, where the air is forced upward by the mountains (orographic lift), causing moisture to drop in the form of rain or snow. This climate supports the Treble Cone Ski Area seven kilometres to the southeast of Black Peak. The months of December through February offer the most favourable weather for viewing or climbing this peak.

== Climbing ==
Climbing routes:

- Eastern Spur
- South East Face (Ice routes)
  - Huge – Dave Vass, Allan Uren – (1993)
  - The Straight Jacket Fits – Allan Uren – (1993)

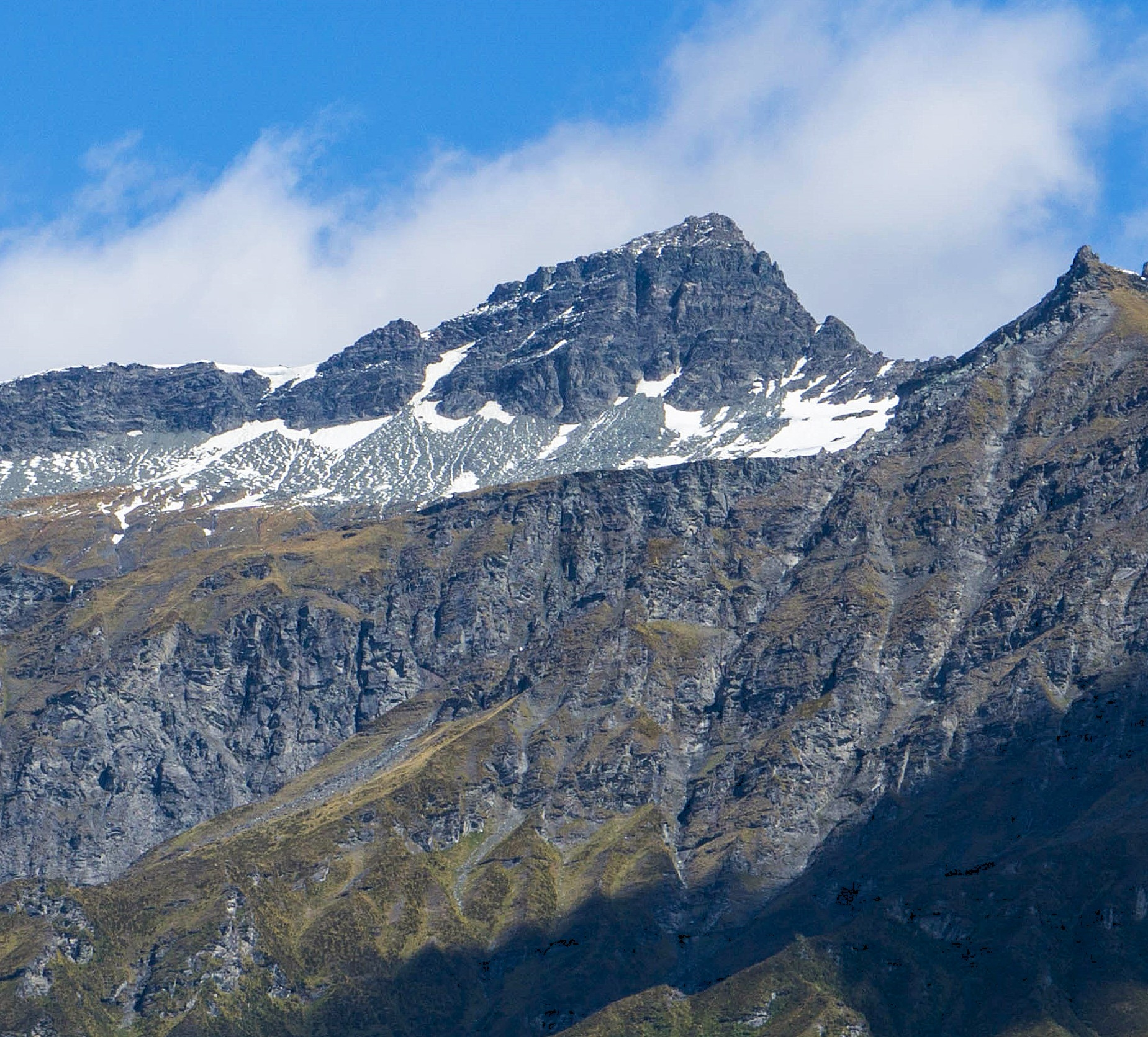
Black Peak

== See also ==
- List of mountains of New Zealand by height
