= Torres Peak =

Mountain in New Zealand

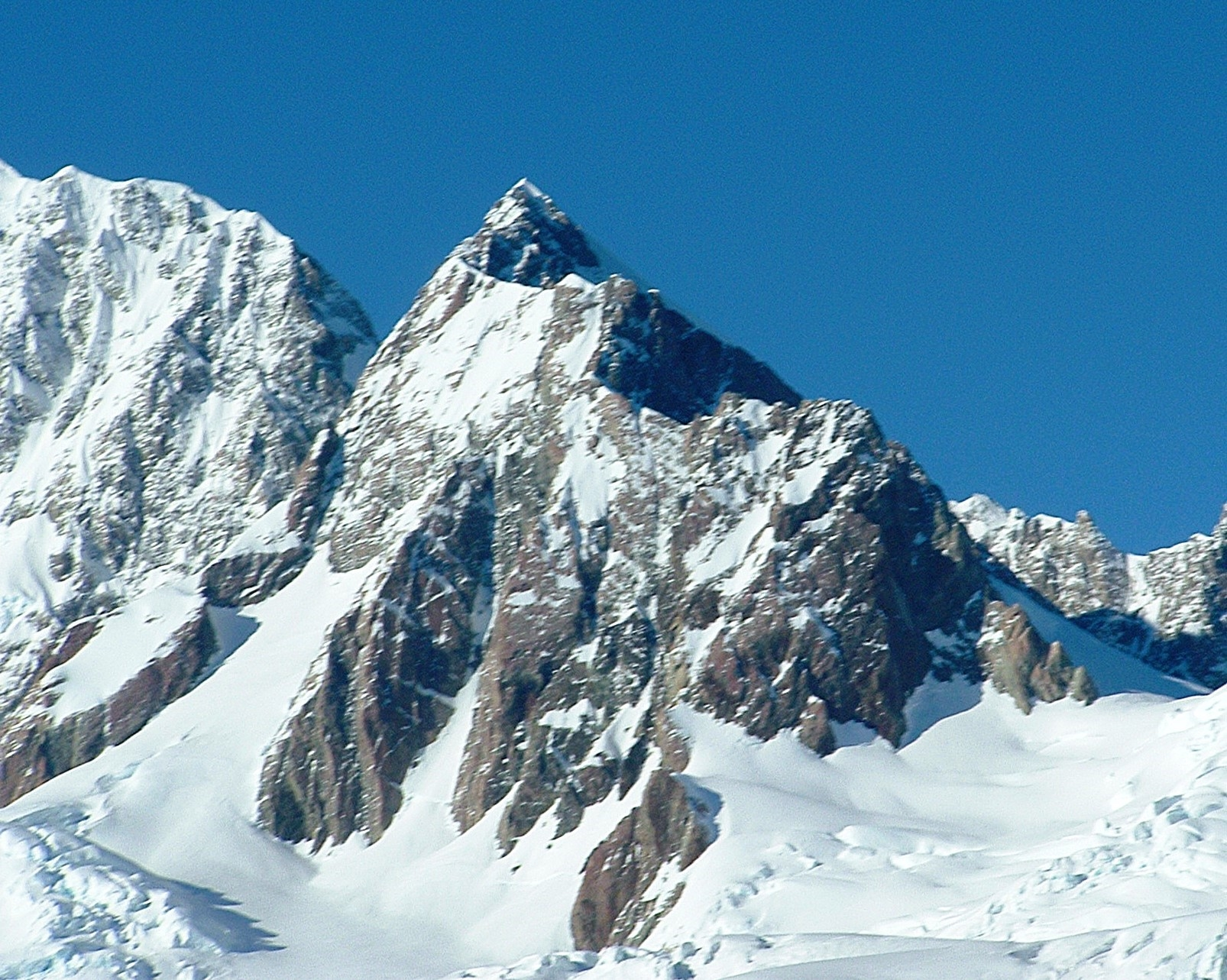
- North aspect

Highest point
- Elevation: 3,160 m (10,370 ft)
- Prominence: 120 m (390 ft)
- Listing: 12th highest in New Zealand
- Coordinates: 43°33′35″S 170°8′47″E

Geography
- Location within New Zealand
- Location: South Island, New Zealand
- Parent range: Southern Alps

Climbing
- First ascent: 1907 by Ebenezer Teichelmann, Alec Graham and Henry Edward Newton

Torres Peak is a mountain in the Southern Alps of New Zealand, and is part of Westland Tai Poutini National Park. It is located two kilometres (1.2 mi) to the north of Aoraki / Mount Cook, close to Mount Tasman, of which it is a secondary peak. It is largely surrounded by the icefields of the Abel Janszoon Glacier.

The first ascent of the peak was made on 4 February 1907 at noon by mountaineers Ebenezer Teichelmann, Alec Graham and Henry Edward Newton from the northwest via Katies Col. The name was given in honour of well-known seafarers.

== Gallery ==
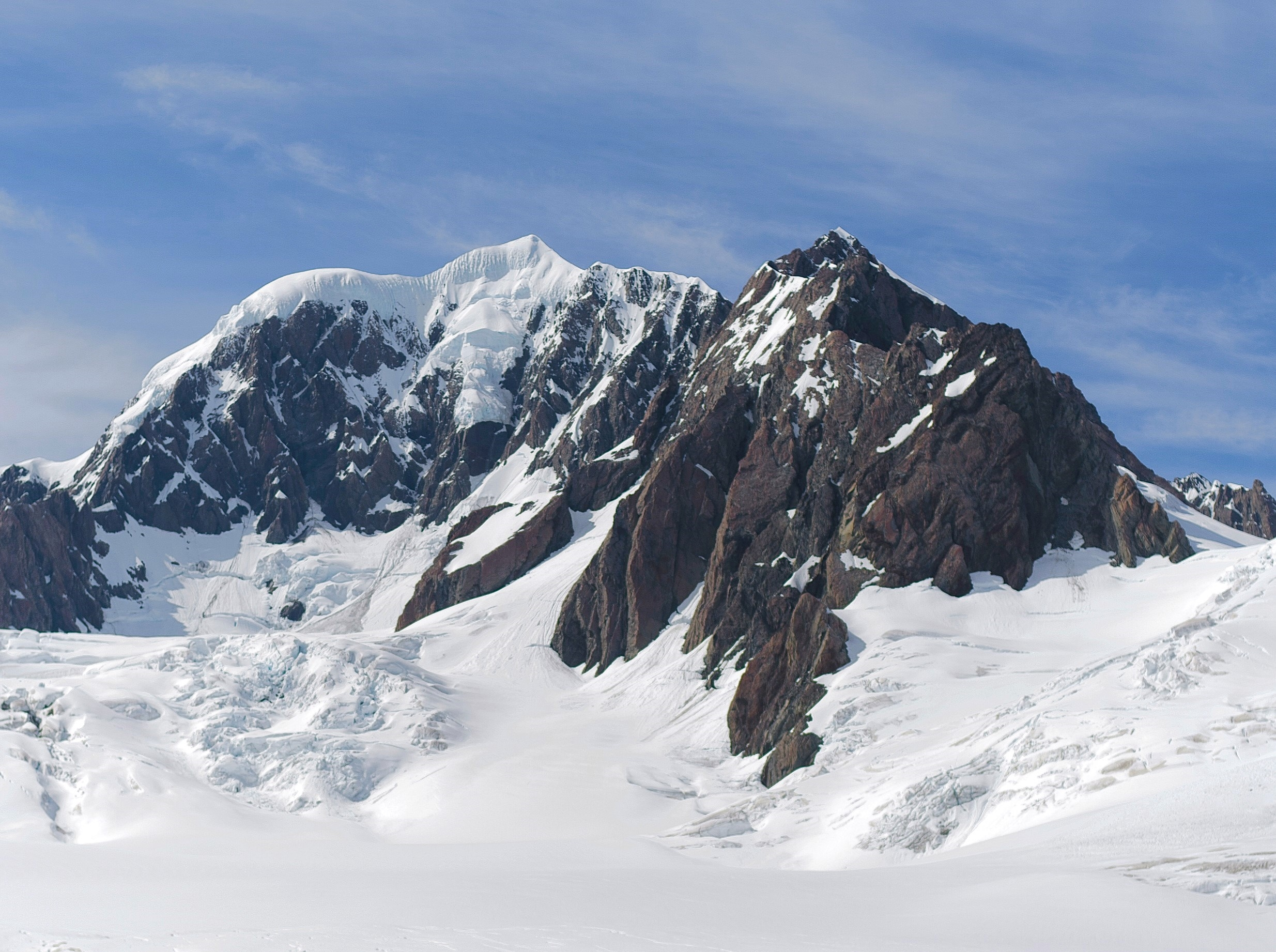
Mount Tasman (left) and Torres Peak (right)

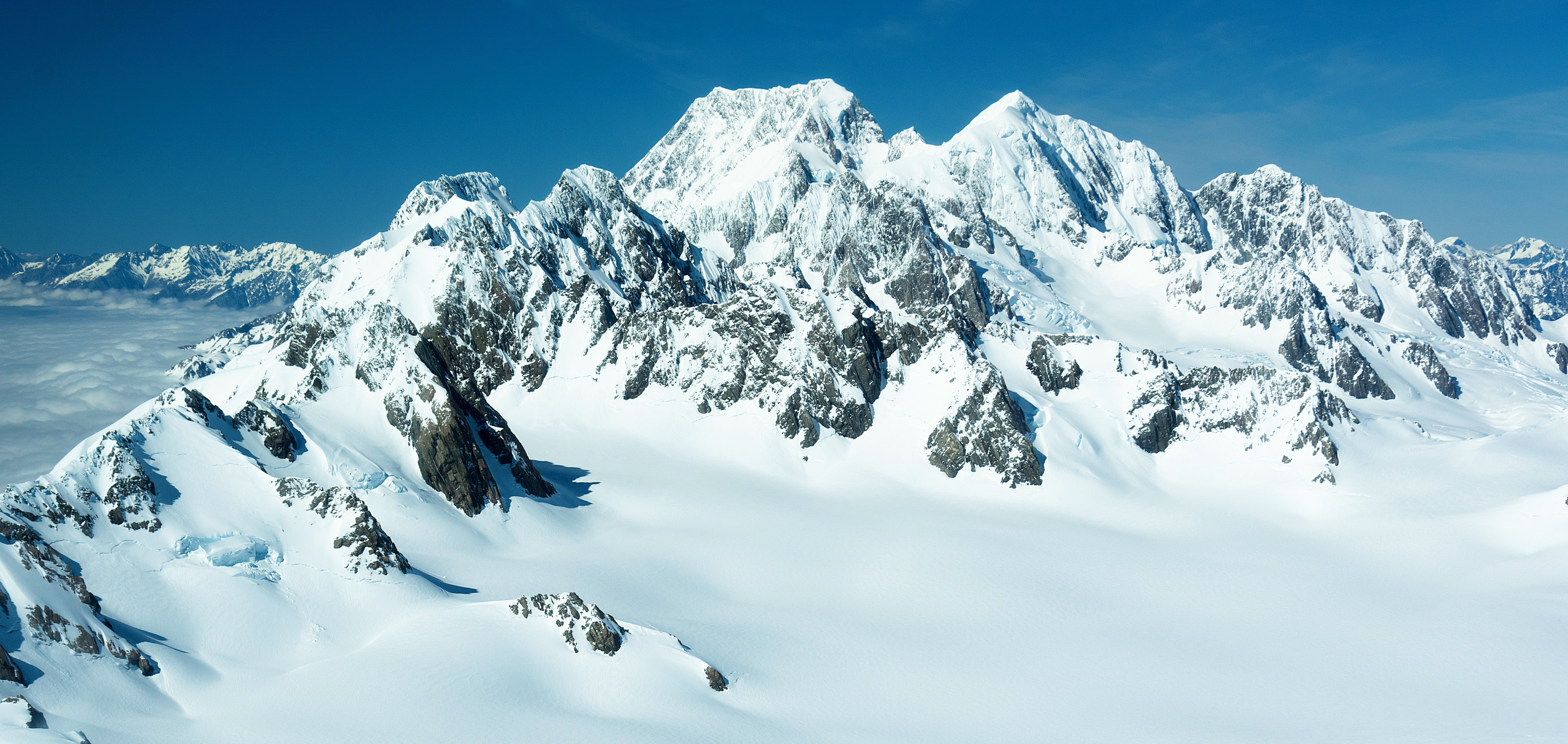
Mount Cook centred, Mount Tasman to its right, and Torres Peak to right of Tasman. Aerial view from northeast.

== See also ==
- List of mountains of New Zealand by height
