= Anti Crow River =

River in Arthur's Pass National Park, New Zealand

- Route of the Anti Crow River
- Mouth of the Anti Crow River Anti Crow River (South Island)

Location
- Country: New Zealand

Physical characteristics
- Source
  - location: Black Range
  - coordinates: 43°01′21″S 171°26′55″E
- Mouth
  - location: Waimakariri River
  - coordinates: 42°59′30″S 171°29′58″E
  - elevation: 720 m (2,360 ft)

Basin features
- Progression: Anti Crow River → Waimakariri River → Pegasus Bay → Pacific Ocean

The Anti Crow River is a small river located in Arthur's Pass National Park, Canterbury, New Zealand. It is a tributary of the Waimakariri River and is named because its valley is opposite that of the Crow River. Mount Damfool is at the head of the Anti Crow River valley.

== See also ==
- List of rivers of New Zealand
