= Mount Magellan (New Zealand) =

Summit in New Zealand

Mount Magellan, also known simply as Magellan, is a mountain in the Southern Alps in Aoraki / Mount Cook National Park on the South Island of New Zealand. The mountain is 3,049 metres (10,003 ft) tall, and is less than 1 kilometre (0.62 mi) northwest of its closest neighbouring peak, the 3,144 metres (10,315 ft) Mount Teichelmann. Its coordinates are 43° 34′ 16″ S , 170° 8′ 31″ E (-43.571, 170.142).

Magellan is named after Portuguese explorer Ferdinand Magellan.
