= Jane Thomson (mountaineer) =

New Zealand mountaineer

Jane Thomson (18 May 1858 – 17 July 1944) was a New Zealand mountaineer. She was born in Kaiapoi, North Canterbury, New Zealand in 1858. Her father was the farmer Donald Coutts, her mother Anne Mackay. She married the civil engineer John Thomson in 1879. Their only child died in 1904.

In 1903 Constance Barnicoat, Ada Perkins and Jane Thomson became the first women to cross Copland Pass. Whilst they were successful, their guide Jack Clarke declared the route "unfit for ladies". In 1915, while based for a summer holiday at the Hermitage, Mount Cook Village, she began a two-year climbing partnership with the Austrian guide Conrad Kain. They ascended many peaks, including Maunga Ma, Mt Jeannette, Malte Brun, and two unnamed peaks. She named one of them in honour of her dead child, Mount Edgar Thomson. In 1916, aged 57, with Conrad Kain she became the second woman, after Freda Du Faur, to traverse Aoraki / Mount Cook, and was the fourth woman to summit the mountain, after Freda Du Faur, Annie Lindon and Muriel Graham. She was photographed at the top of the peak by Conrad Kain, using her camera. Aged 68, she made her first ascent of the low peak of Mount Rolleston in Arthur's Pass National Park. Aged 80, she travelled to Kashmir to visit Nanga Parbat.

She is buried in an unmarked grave in Christchurch's Ruru Lawn Cemetery. As of January 2026, fundraising for a memorial plaque for Thomson was underway.
