= Glentanar =

Glentanar may refer to:

- Glen Tanar, a glen in Aberdeenshire, Scotland
- Glentanar F.C., a junior association football club based in Woodside, Aberdeen
- Baron Glentanar, a title in the Peerage of the United Kingdom

== See also ==
- Glentanner (disambiguation)
