= Dun Fiunary =

Mountain in the Canterbury Region of New Zealand

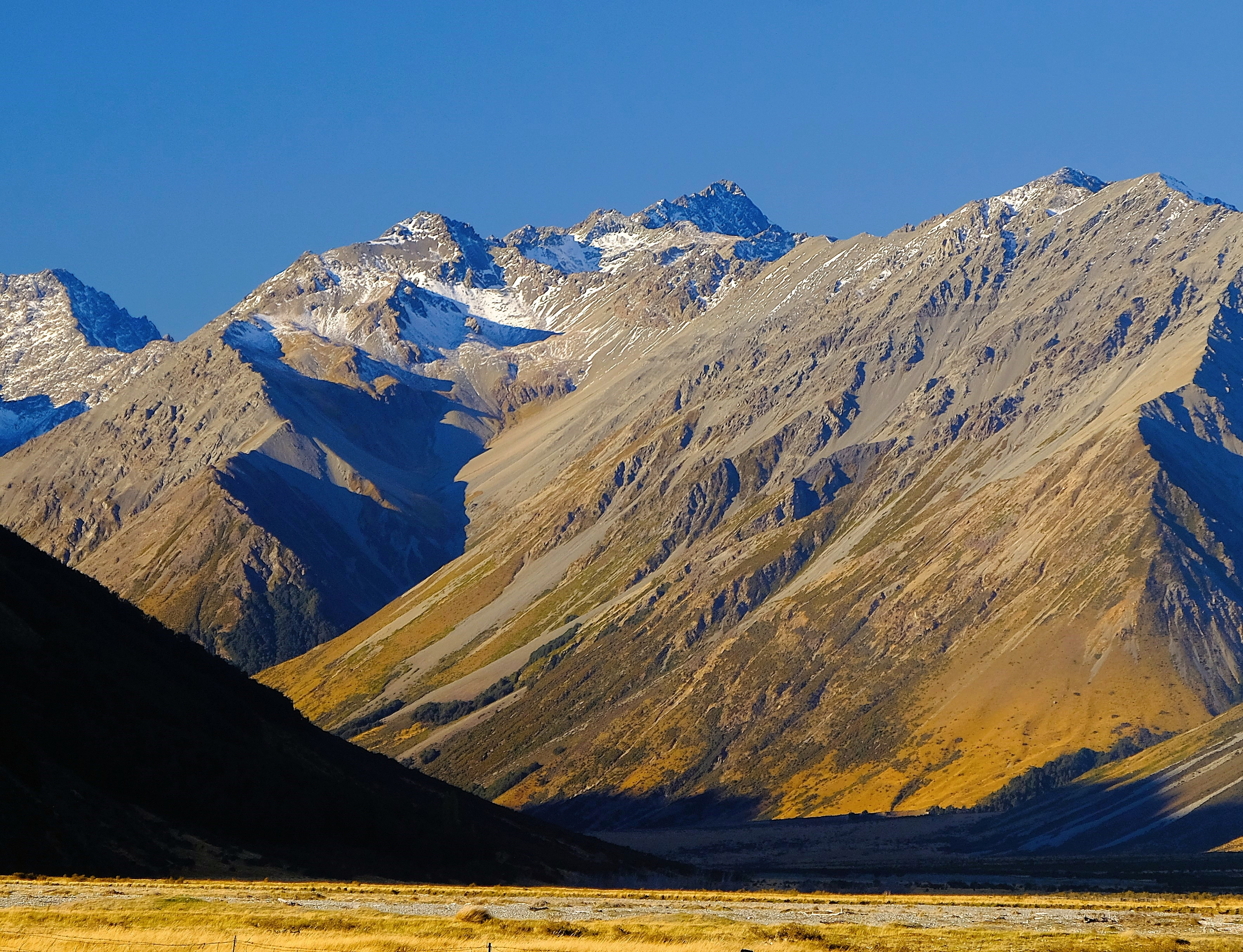
- Southwest aspect

Highest point
- Elevation: 2,500 m (8,202 ft)
- Prominence: 380 m (1,247 ft)
- Isolation: 4.12 km (2.56 mi)
- Listing: New Zealand #74
- Coordinates: 43.945323°S 170.021146°E

Geography
- Location within New Zealand
- Interactive map of Dun Fiunary
- Location: South Island
- Country: New Zealand
- Region: Canterbury
- Protected area: Ruataniwha Conservation Park
- Parent range: Southern Alps; Ben Ohau Range
- Topo map(s): NZMS260 H37; Topo50 BY15

Geology
- Rock type: Rakaia Terrane

Climbing
- First ascent: April 1939

Dun Fiunary is a 2,500-metre-elevation (8,202-foot) mountain in the Canterbury Region of New Zealand.

== Description ==
Dun Fiunary is located 230 kilometres (143 mi) southwest of Christchurch in the Ruataniwha Conservation Park. The peak is set between the Dobson Valley and Lake Pukaki in the Ben Ohau Range of the Southern Alps. Precipitation runoff from the mountain drains east into Lake Pukaki whereas the west slope drains into the Dobson River. Topographic relief is significant as the summit rises 1,800 metres (5,906 feet) above the Dobson Valley in four kilometres. The nearest higher peak is Glentanner Peak, four kilometres to the north. The mountain's toponym comes from the Scottish traditional song, Farewell to Fiunary, specifically the line, "And viewed the sun's departing ray wand'ring o'er Dun Fiunary." "Dun" is a nut-brown colour and "Fiunary" is a coastal town in the Scottish Highlands. The song was written by Rev. Dr. Norman MacLeod.

== Climbing ==
Climbing routes with first ascents:

- North Face – Rex Booth, Reg Winn – (April 1939)
- South East Ridge – Norman Hardie – (1948)
- West Ridge – Norman Hardie – (1948)
- Via Stewart Stream – Norman Hardie – (1948)
- South Face – Kynan Bazley, Antony Bush – (October 2004)

== Climate ==
Based on the Köppen climate classification, Dun Fiunary is located in a marine west coast (Cfb) climate zone, with a subpolar oceanic climate (Cfc) at the summit. Prevailing westerly winds blow moist air from the Tasman Sea onto the mountains, where the air is forced upwards by the mountains (orographic lift), causing moisture to drop in the form of rain or snow. The months of December through February offer the most favourable weather for viewing or climbing this peak.

== See also ==
- List of mountains of New Zealand by height

== Gallery ==
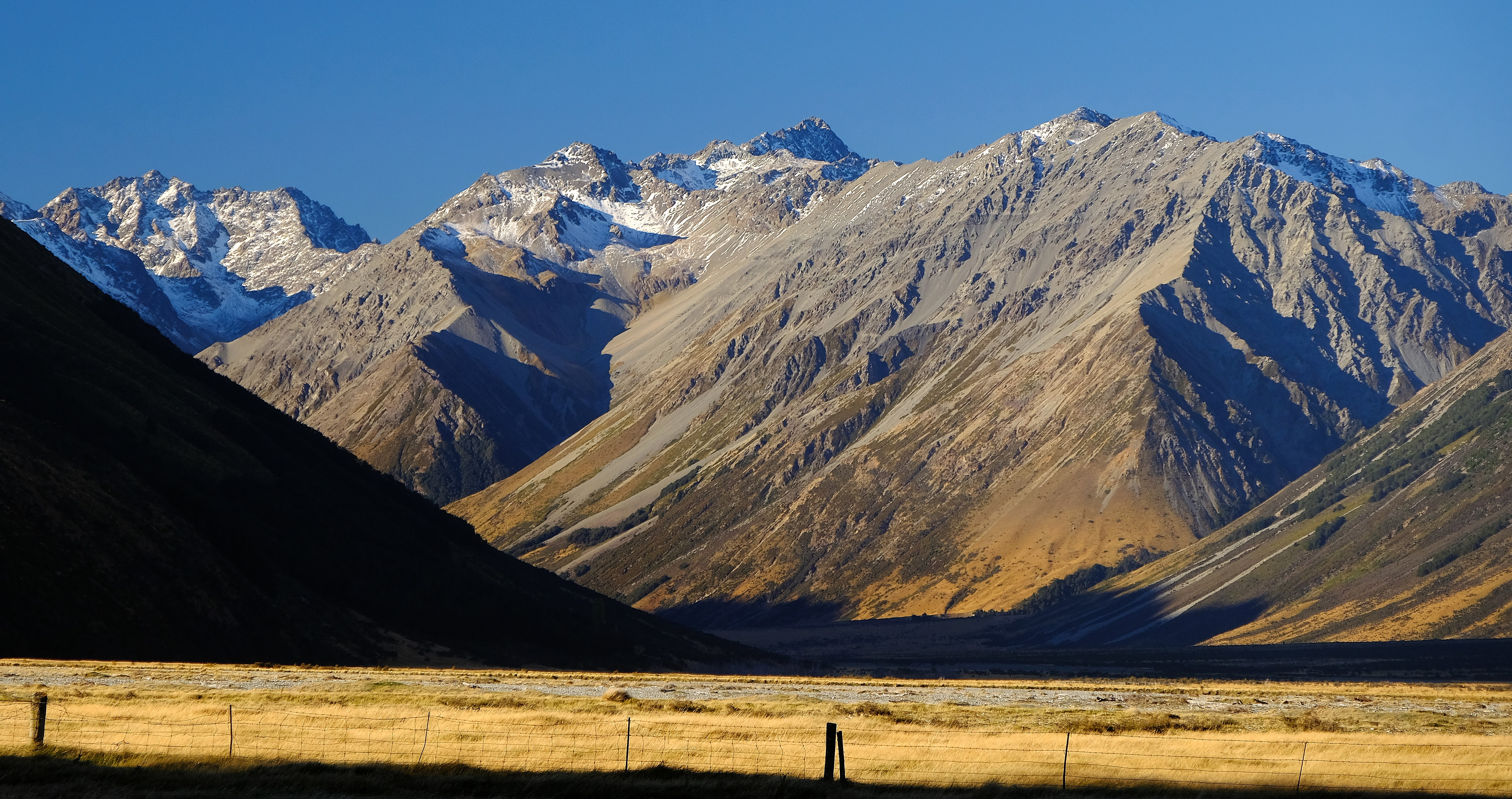
Dun Fiunary centred, with Glentanner Peak to left
