= Mount Edgar Thomson =

Mountain in Canterbury, New Zealand

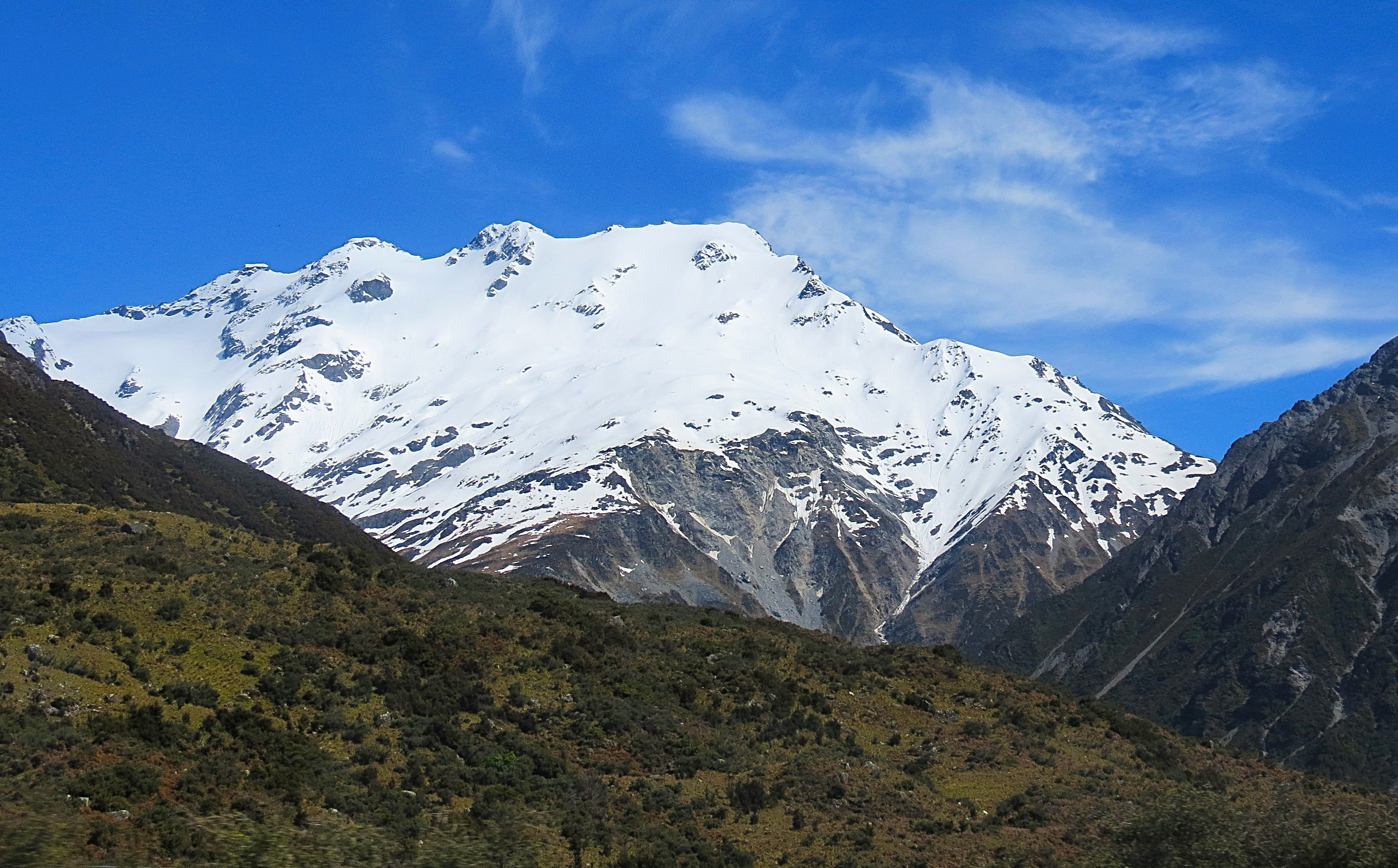
- Southeast aspect

Highest point
- Elevation: 2,379 m (7,805 ft)
- Prominence: 206 m (676 ft)
- Isolation: 2.04 km (1.27 mi)
- Coordinates: 43°46′38″S 170°03′51″E

Naming
- Etymology: Edgar Thomson

Geography
- Location within New Zealand
- Interactive map of Mount Edgar Thomson
- Location: South Island
- Country: New Zealand
- Region: Canterbury
- Protected area: Aoraki / Mount Cook National Park
- Parent range: Southern Alps; Ben Ohau Range
- Topo map(s): NZMS260 H36; Topo50 CB08

Climbing
- First ascent: April 1915
- Easiest route: South Ridge

Mount Edgar Thomson is a 2,379-metre-elevation (7,805-foot) mountain in the Canterbury Region of New Zealand.

== Description ==
Mount Edgar Thomson is set in the Ben Ohau Range of the Southern Alps and is situated in the Canterbury Region of South Island. This peak is located 5.5 kilometres (3.4 mi) south-southwest of Mount Cook Village in Aoraki / Mount Cook National Park. Precipitation runoff from the mountain drains east to the Tasman River via Hoophorn and Birch Hill streams, whereas the west slope drains into headwaters of the Dobson River. Topographic relief is significant as the summit rises 1,380 metres (4,528 feet) above Hoophorn Stream in 1.5 kilometres. The nearest higher peak is Mount Sealy, two kilometres to the northwest. The first ascent of the summit was made in April 1915 by Jane Thomson and Conrad Kain. The mountain's toponym was applied by Jane Thomson to honour her only child, Edgar (1881–1904), who had died in 1904 at age 23 from a football injury. Edgar Thomson died at the Wellington Hospital after sustaining a head injury while playing a rugby match.

== Climbing ==
Climbing routes with first ascents:

- East Ridge – Jane Thomson, Conrad Kain – (1915)
- South Face – J.A. Roberts, Clem Williams – (1925)
- South Ridge – Charlie Collins, David Hall, Priestly Thomson – (1946)
- Whiteley Woute – Richard Whiteley – (1971)
- Central Rib – Hans Muller, Otto Van Allman – (1973)
- West Face – Tim Steward, Reg Measures – (2012)

== Climate ==
Based on the Köppen climate classification, Mount Edgar Thomson is located in a marine west coast (Cfb) climate zone, with a subpolar oceanic climate (Cfc) at the summit. Prevailing westerly winds blow moist air from the Tasman Sea onto the mountains, where the air is forced upward by the mountains (orographic lift), causing moisture to drop in the form of rain or snow. This climate supports a small unnamed glacier on the peak's south slope. The months of December through February offer the most favourable weather for viewing or climbing this peak.

== Gallery ==
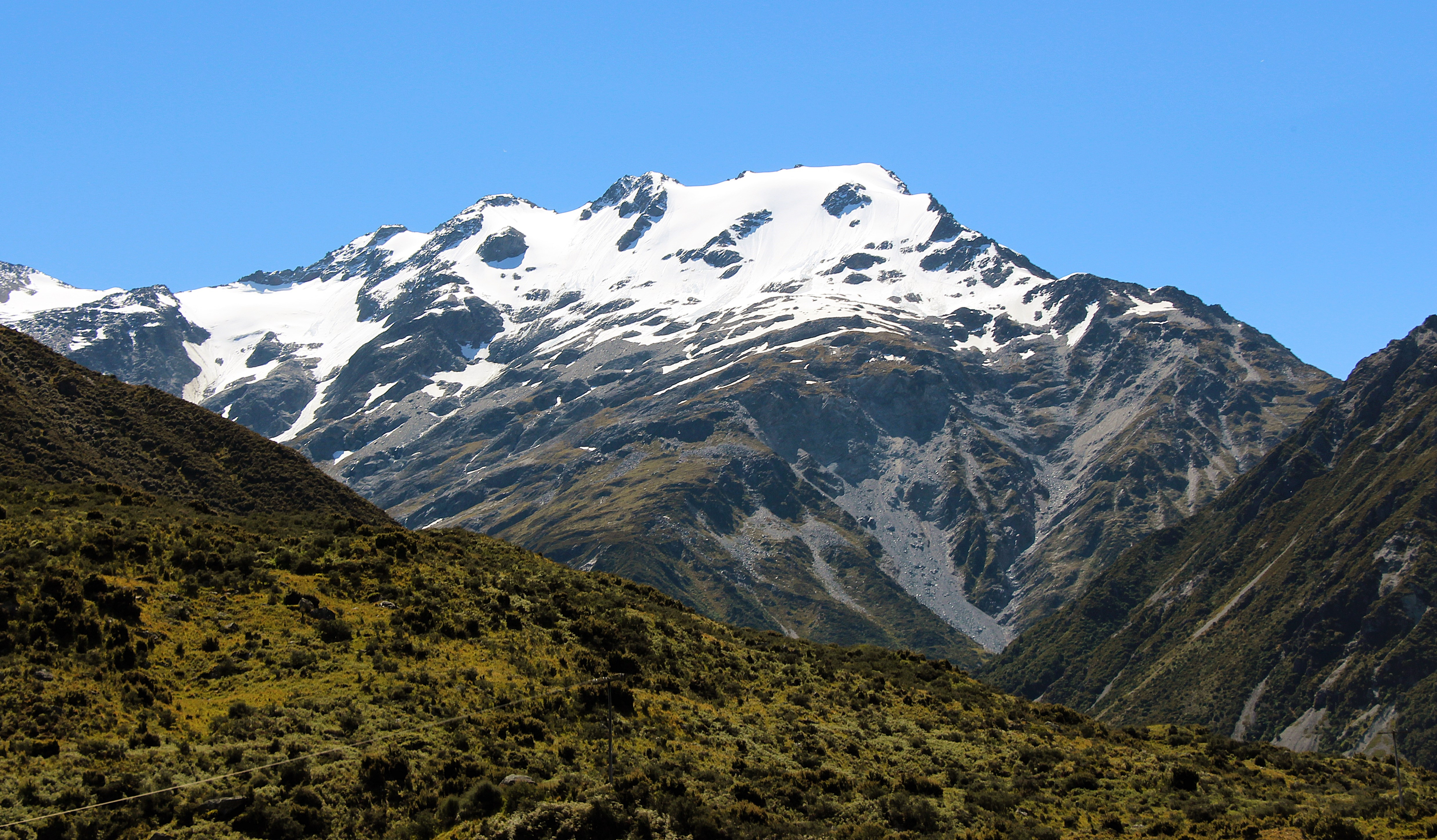
Southeast aspect

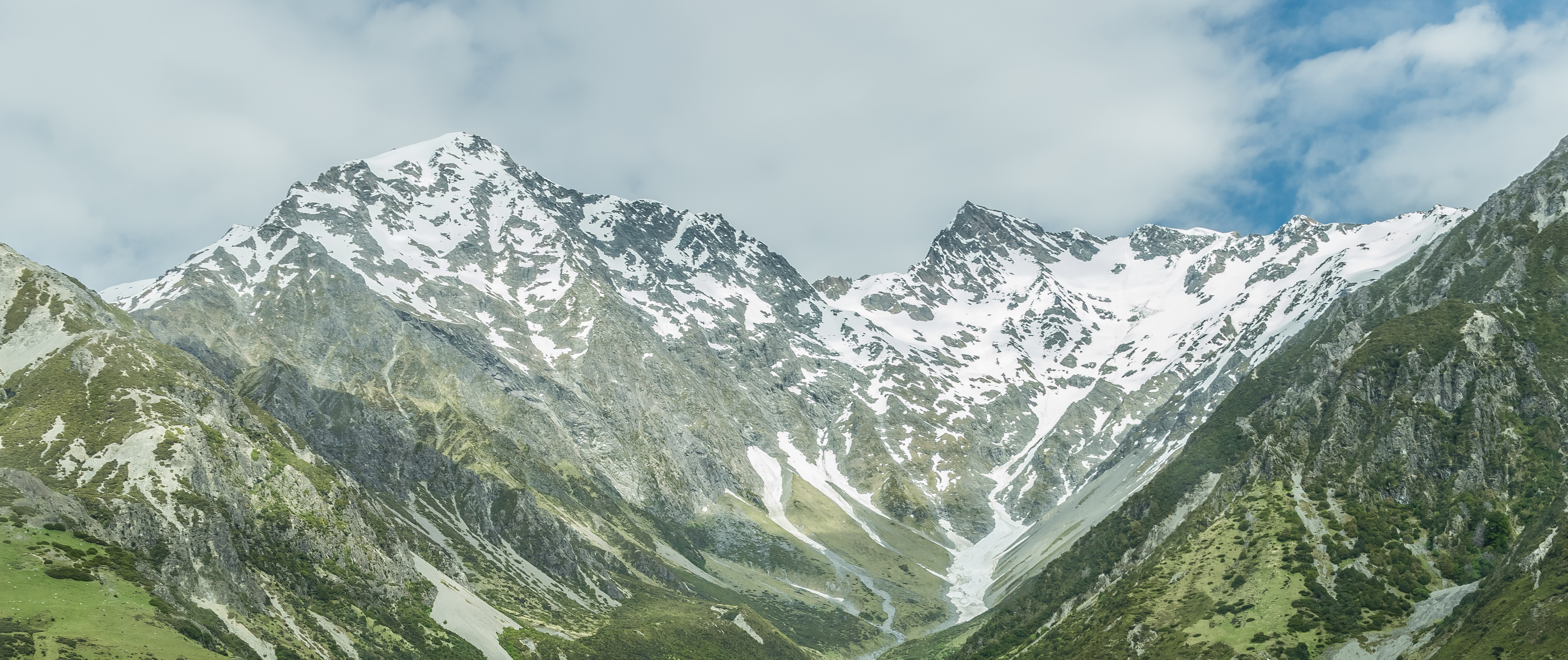
Mount Edgar Thomson (left) and the valley of Hoophorn Stream

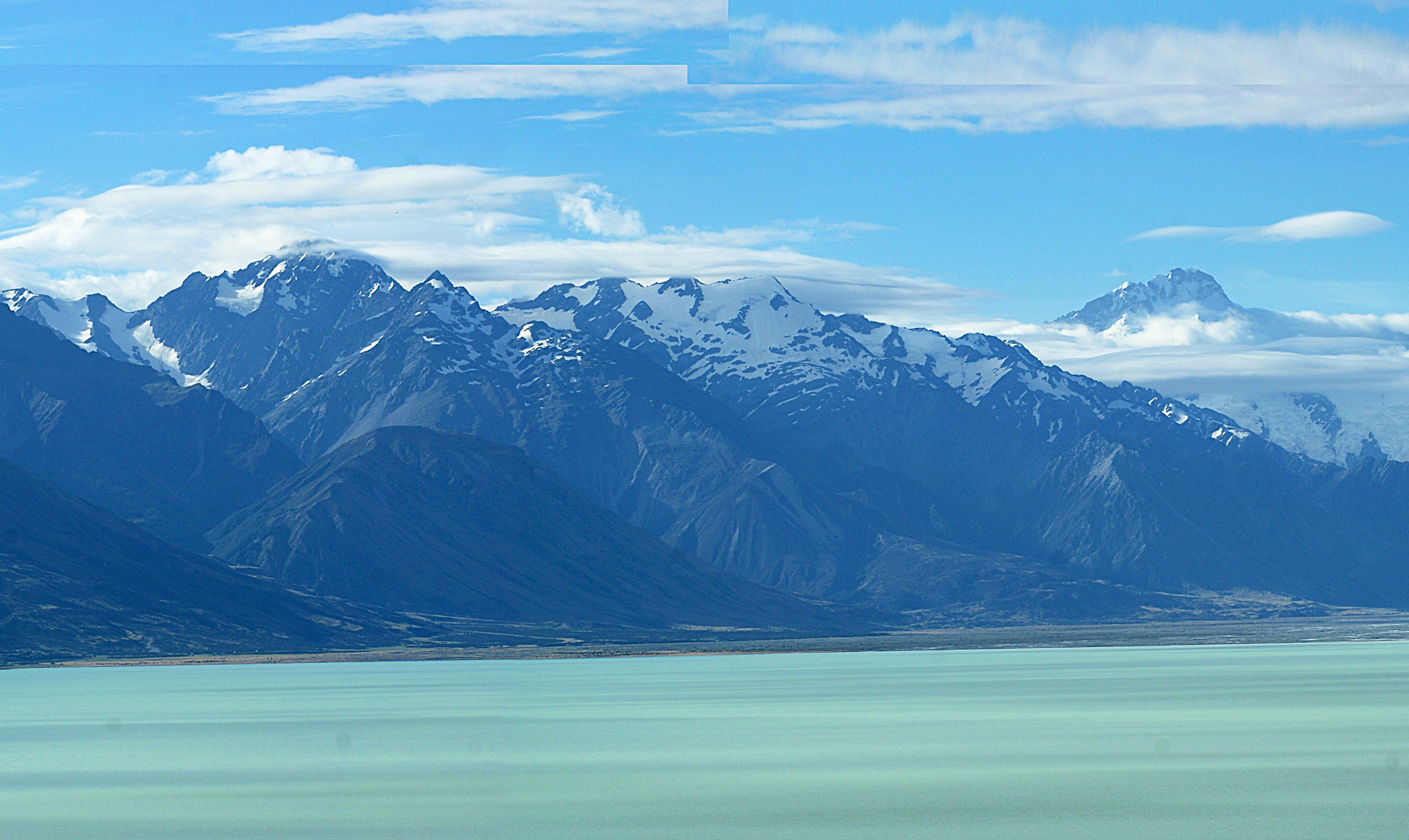
Mount Cran (left), Mount Edgar Thomson (center), Mount Sefton (right) across Lake Pukaki.

== See also ==
- List of mountains of New Zealand by height
