= Avalanche Peak (New Zealand) =

Alpine peak in Arthur's Pass, New Zealand

Coordinates: 42.9448°S 171.5357°E

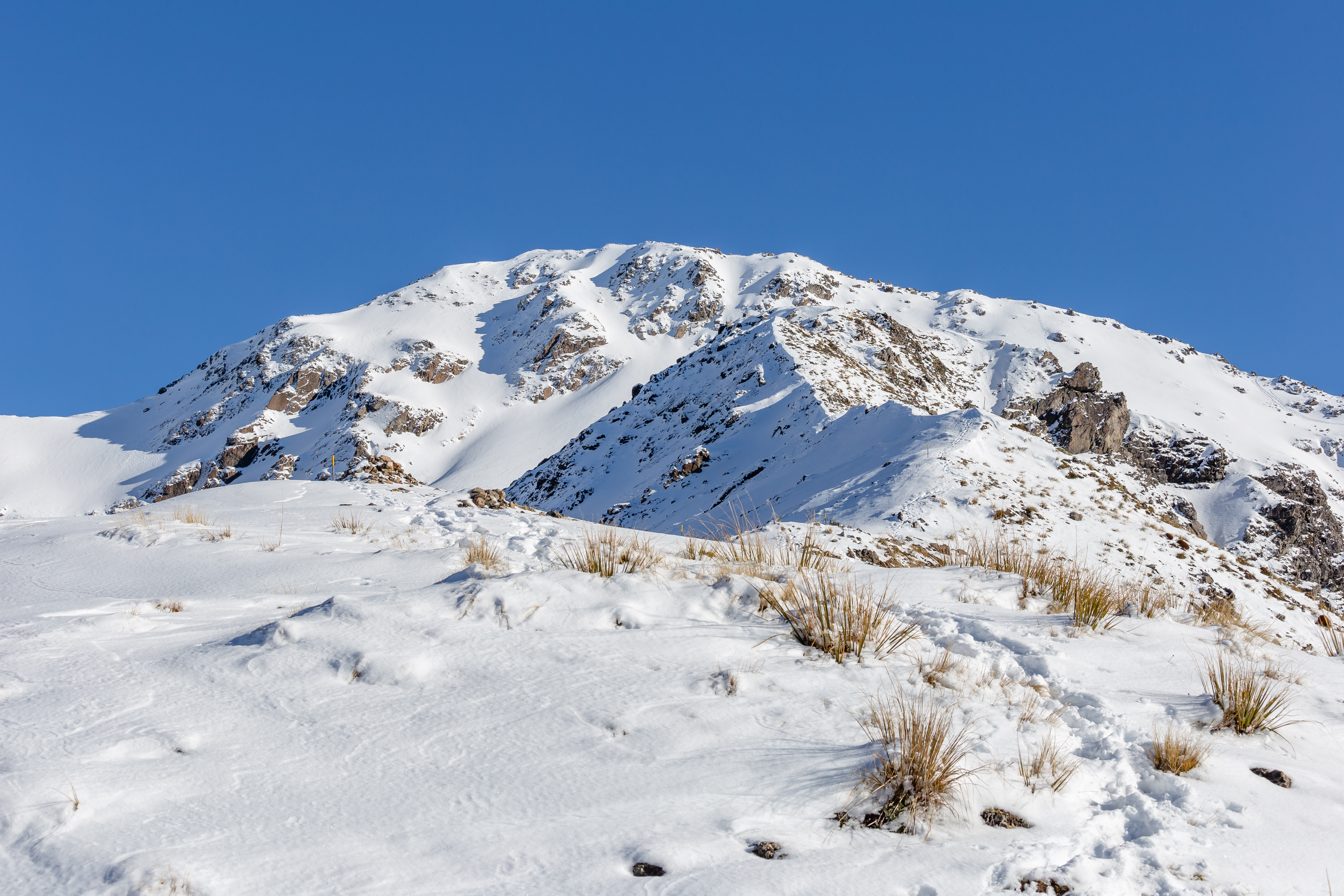
- Avalanche Peak

Highest point
- Elevation: 1,833 m (6,014 ft)
- Listing: List of mountains of New Zealand by height

Geography
- Location within New Zealand
- Location: South Island, New Zealand
- Parent range: Southern Alps

Climbing
- Easiest route: Avalanche Peak Track

Avalanche Peak is a 1,833 metres (6,014 ft) peak in the Arthur's Pass National Park in New Zealand. It is subject to avalanches in the winter, hence its name. Avalanche Peak has sheer drops of around 80 metres (260 ft) at the peak of the mountain and therefore is not recommended in icy or windy weather.

== Avalanche Peak Track ==
The Department of Conservation maintains two one-day tramping routes up to the summit, the Avalanche Peak Route and Scotts Route, both starting and easily accessible from Arthur's Pass village. It is the only poled summit route in the area. The peak is one of the most popular summer tramping routes in Arthur's Pass, offering views of several mountain ranges in the park on a clear day. It is also a popular place for kea.

There is an annual mountain run, the Avalanche Peak Challenge, which crosses the peak.

Since 1933 there have been several reported fatalities of people attempting the peak.
