= Glentanner =

Glentanner may refer to:

- Glentanner (ship), a Scottish immigrant ship lost in 1861
- Glentanner Aerodrome, an aerodrome in New Zealand
- Glentanner Peak, a mountain in New Zealand

== See also ==
- Glentanar (disambiguation)
