= Glentanner Peak =

Mountain in New Zealand

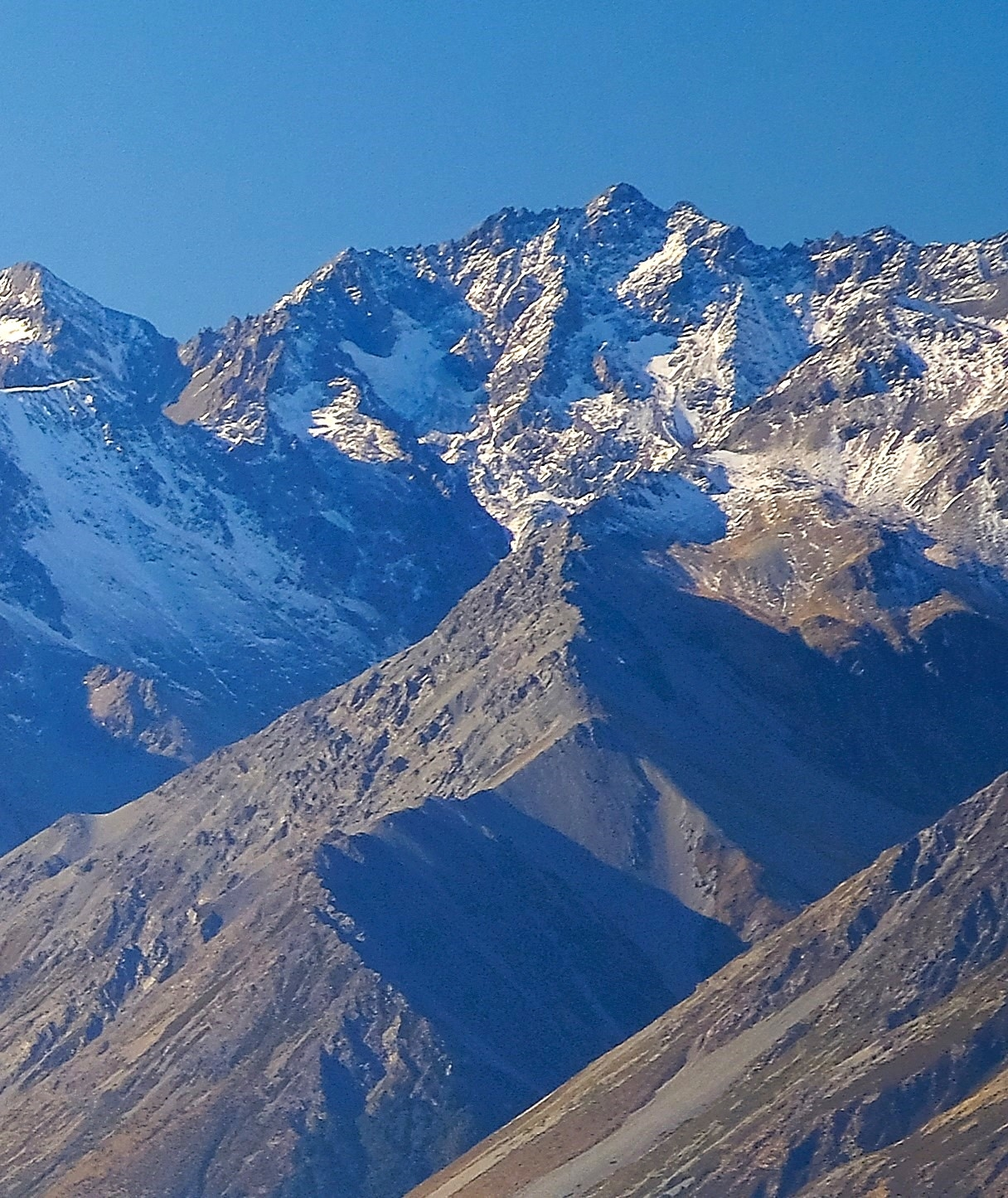
- South Face

Highest point
- Elevation: 2,551 m (8,369 ft)
- Prominence: 251 m (823 ft)
- Isolation: 3.26 km (2.03 mi)
- Coordinates: 43.908019°S 170.022762°E

Geography
- Location within New Zealand
- Interactive map of Glentanner Peak
- Location: South Island
- Country: New Zealand
- Region: Canterbury
- Parent range: Southern Alps; Ben Ohau Range

Geology
- Rock age: Triassic
- Rock type: Rakaia Terrane

Glentanner Peak is a 2,551-metre-elevation (8,369-foot) mountain in the Canterbury Region of New Zealand.

== Description ==
Glentanner Peak is located 228 kilometres (142 mi) southwest of Christchurch and set between the Dobson Valley and Lake Pukaki in the South Island. It is the second-highest peak in the Ben Ohau Range of the Southern Alps. Precipitation runoff from the mountain drains east into Lake Pukaki and west into the Dobson River. Topographic relief is significant as the summit rises 1,850 metres (6,070 feet) above the Dobson Valley in four kilometres. The nearest higher peak is Mauka Atua, 3.26 kilometres to the north. Glentanner Peak and Ferintosh Peak were known locally as "The Twins" for 70 years by the Glentanner and Glen Lyon sheep stations. The mountain's toponym is derived from Glentanner Station, which the peak overlooks. Edward Dark established Glentanner Station in 1858, and he named it after the ship Glentanner which brought him to New Zealand in 1857. The mountain's toponym has been officially approved by the New Zealand Geographic Board.

== Climbing ==
Climbing routes with first ascents:

- North Face – Ross Cullen – (April 1992)
- South East Ridge – Ruari Macfarlane – (February 2021)

== Climate ==
Based on the Köppen climate classification, Glentanner Peak is located in a marine west coast (Cfb) climate zone, with a subpolar oceanic climate (Cfc) at the summit. Prevailing westerly winds blow moist air from the Tasman Sea onto the mountains, where the air is forced upwards by the mountains (orographic lift), causing moisture to drop in the form of rain or snow. This climate supports a glacieret on the southwest slope of this peak. The months of December through February offer the most favourable weather for viewing or climbing this peak.

== See also ==
- List of mountains of New Zealand by height

== Gallery ==
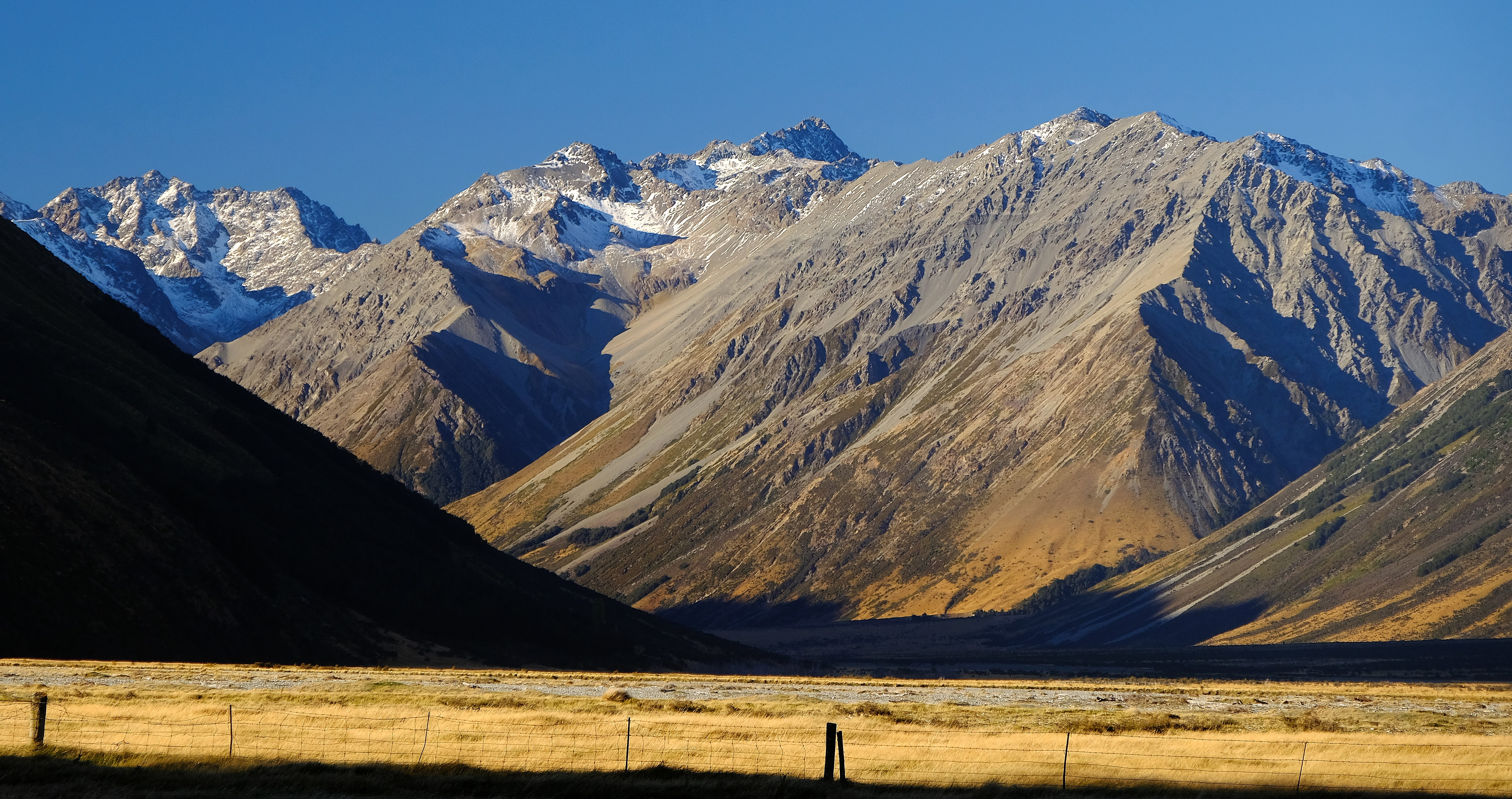
Dun Fiunary centred, with Glentanner Peak to left
