= Ruataniwha Conservation Park =

Conservation park in New Zealand

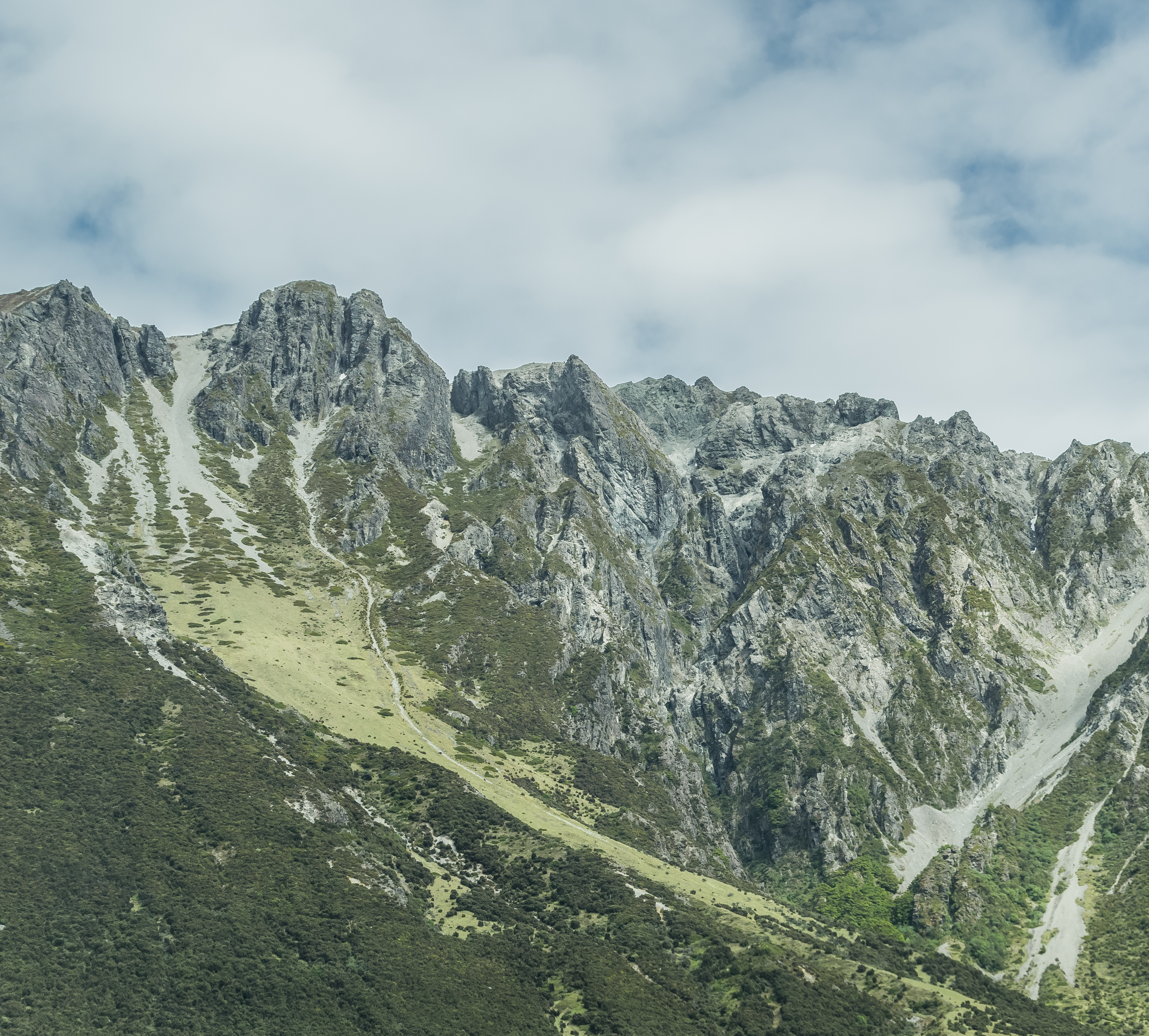
- Ruataniwha Conservation Park

- Location within New Zealand
- Location: New Zealand
- Nearest town: Twizel
- Coordinates: 43.9999981°S 169.9824904°E
- Area: 37,145 hectares (91,790 acres)
- Established: 2006
- Governing body: Department of Conservation

Ruataniwha Conservation Park is a protected area near Twizel, in the Mackenzie District and Canterbury Region of New Zealand's South Island.

The park is managed by the New Zealand Department of Conservation.

== Geography ==
The park covers 37,145 hectares (91,790 acres), including Dobson Valley, Hopkins Valley, Huxley Valley, Temple Valley and Maitland Valley and the Ben Ohau Range.

== History ==
The park was established in 2006.
