= Hawdon River =

River in New Zealand

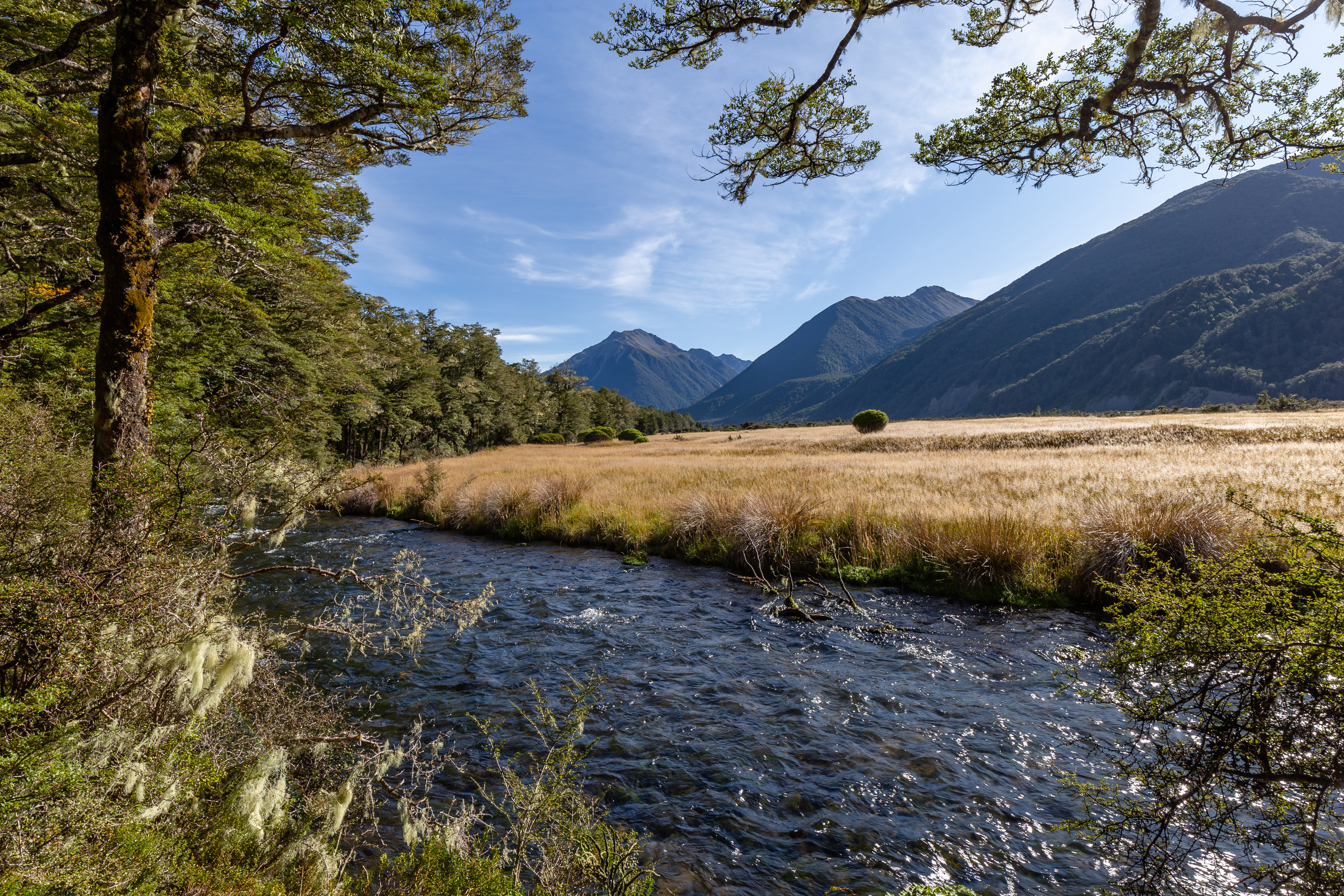
- Route of the Hawdon River
- Mouth of the Hawdon River Hawdon River (South Island)

Location
- Country: New Zealand

Physical characteristics
- Source: Mount Hunt
  - coordinates: 42.8794°S 171.7478°E
- Mouth
  - location: Waimakariri River
  - coordinates: 43°00′05″S 171°44′20″E
- Length: 17 km (11 mi)

Basin features
- Progression: Hawdon River → Waimakariri River → Pegasus Bay → Pacific Ocean
- Tributaries
  - left: East Hawdon Stream
  - right: Twin Fall Stream, Discovery Stream, Sudden Valley Stream

The Hawdon River is a river of New Zealand. One of the headwaters of Canterbury's Waimakariri River, it flows south through Arthur's Pass National Park, reaching the Waimakariri to the north of the settlement of Cass.

== See also ==
- List of rivers of New Zealand
