= Arthur's Pass National Park =

National park in New Zealand

- IUCN category II (national park)
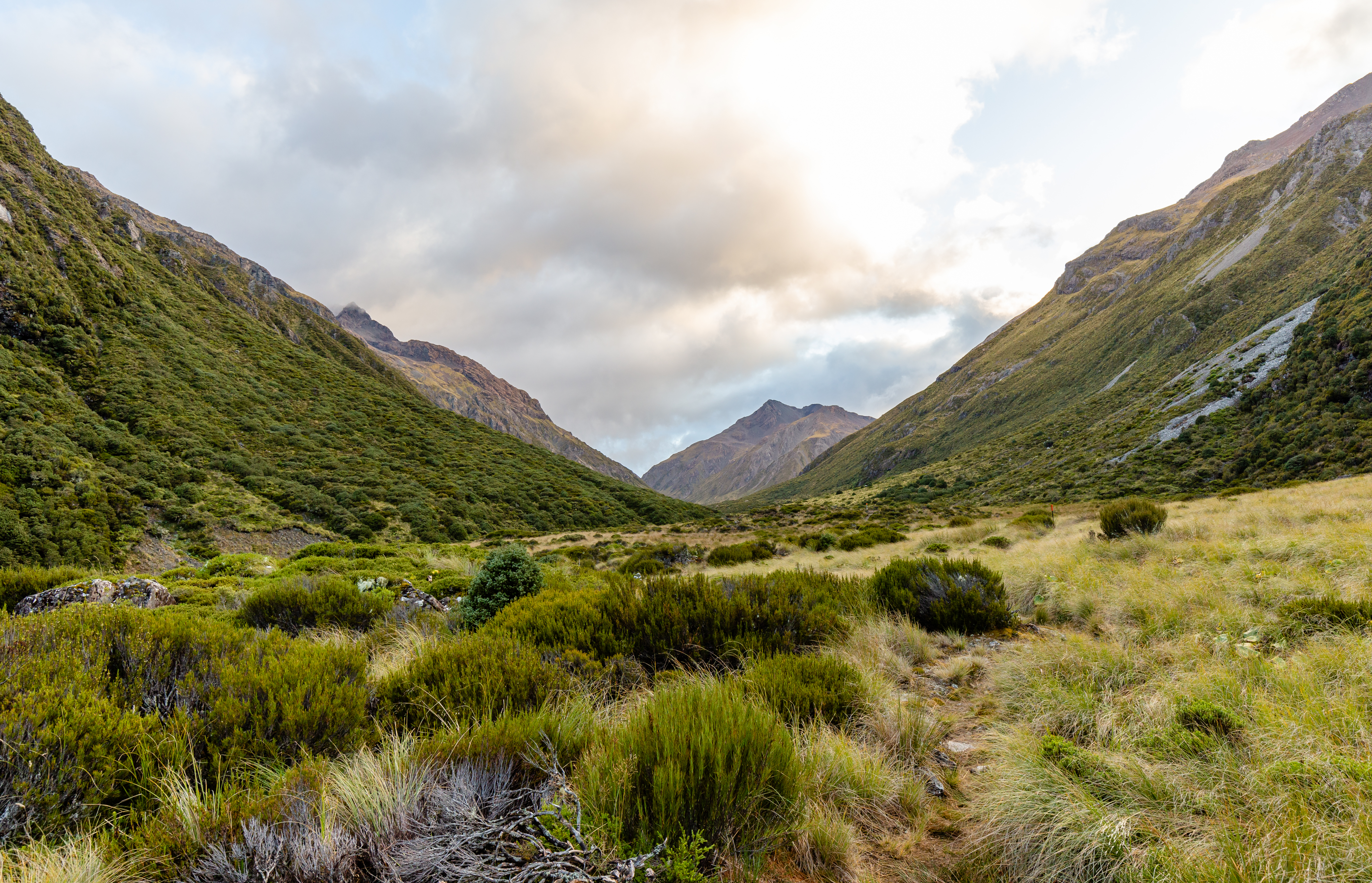
- Edwards Valley, within Arthurs Pass National Park
- Interactive map of Arthur's Pass National Park
- Location: Canterbury, New Zealand
- Nearest city: Christchurch, New Zealand
- Coordinates: 42°57′S 171°34′E
- Area: 1,184.7 km^{2} (457.4 sq mi)
- Established: 1929
- Governing body: Department of Conservation

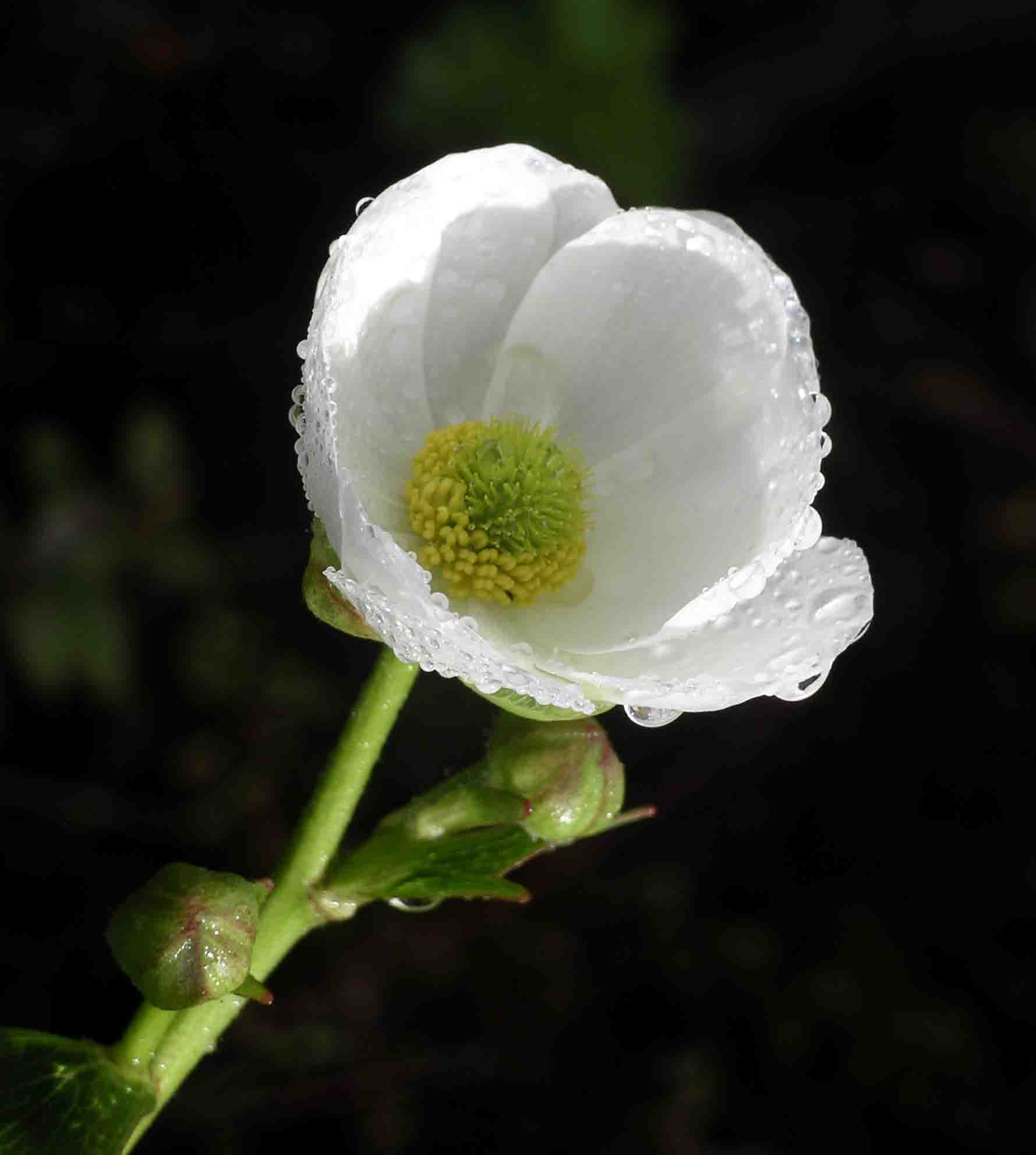
Flower of Ranunculus lyallii at Arthur's Pass

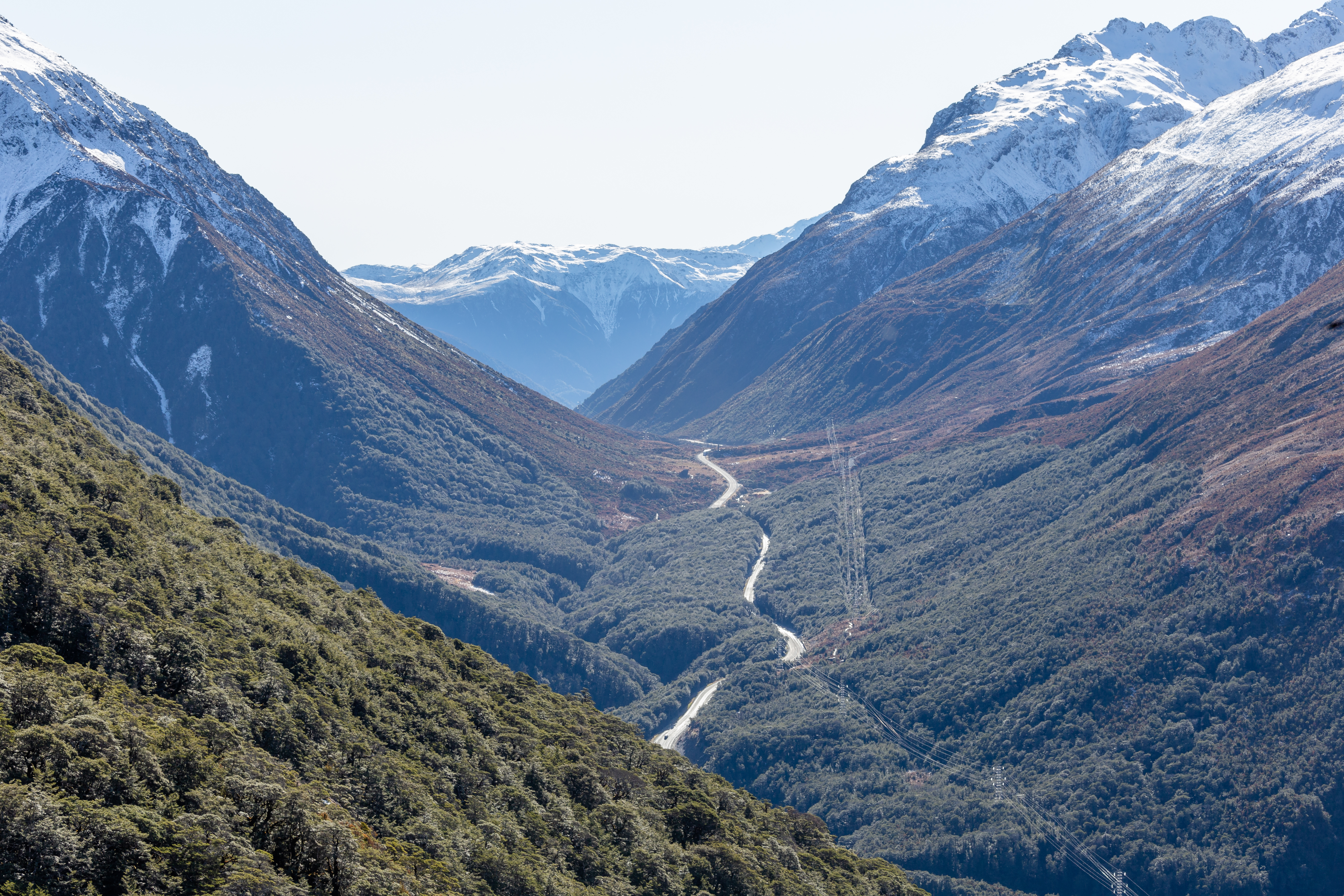
Arthur's Pass seen from the slopes of Avalanche Peak

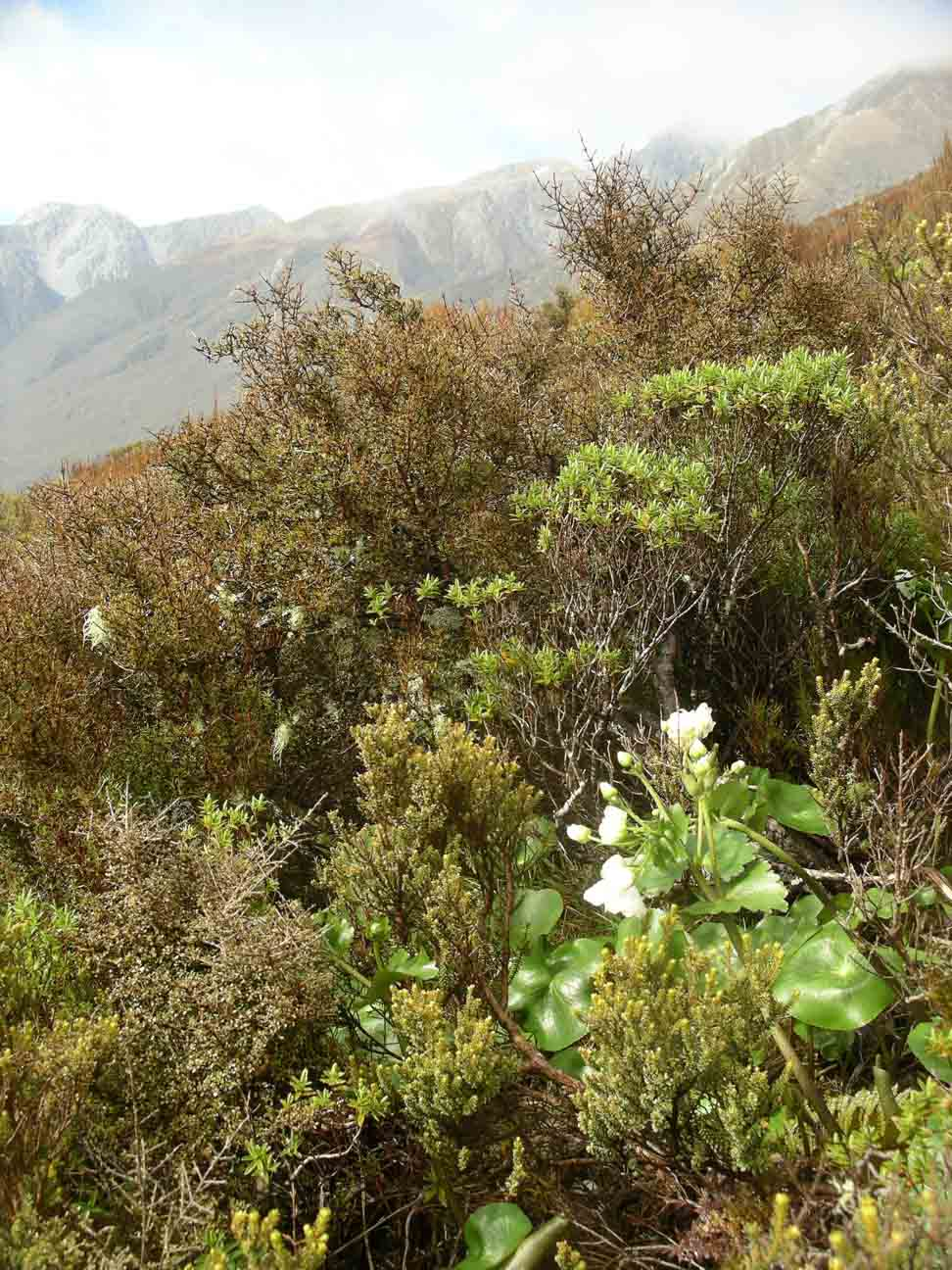
Ranunculus lyallii at Arthur's Pass

Arthur's Pass National Park is located in the South Island of New Zealand and covers 1,185 km^{2} of mostly mountainous terrain. Adjacent to it lies Craigieburn Forest Park. The park is administered by the Department of Conservation.

== History ==
=== Park establishment ===
Land in Arthur's Pass and the Otira Gorge was originally set aside under the Lands Act 1885 and the Scenery Preservation Act of 1903. This land later became the foundation for the national park.

After the Midland railway line was built, train trips from Christchurch to the Otira Gorge began in 1926 when the Railway Department organised day excursions for hundreds of tourists. Unfortunately, native flowers were popular souvenirs. Some individuals chose to cut down trees to obtain rātā blooms. As a result, there was a large push to establish national park status for the area. Arthur′s Pass National Park was established in 1929, becoming the first national park in the South Island and the third in New Zealand. Underfunding meant that national park status was initially in name only: it took a number of years for the flora and fauna in the park to be fully protected.

==== Park rangers ====
The first park ranger at Arthur's Pass National Park was Charles Edward Warden, who was appointed in 1929 on the establishment of the park and served until November 1937. Warden lived in a cottage at 'Tin Town' inside the park and was paid an honorarium for his work, which included marking and maintaining tracks, public relations and advice to visitors about the park, and trying to stop tourists from destroying or removing plants. In 1942, Warden was appointed to the Arthur's Pass National Park Board of Control. The first full-time ranger at the park, Martin Burke, was employed in 1938.

Ray Cleland, ranger from 1950 to 1958, made many improvements in the park. He established a museum, oversaw building of a park ranger's house and workshop, and helped establish a 48-bunk youth hostel and a chapel. Walking tracks for less-fit visitors were created along with camping and picnic sites and more information signs. Cleland attempted to control plant and animal pests and had to deal with "boisterous" visitors on excursion trains. Cleland is remembered in the name of a street (Cleland Place) in Arthur's Pass village.

=== Expansion ===
In 1901, the Riversdale Flats were gazetted for inclusion in Arthur's Pass National Park, However, when the park was created in 1929, the 1,000 hectares of the Riversdale Flats were excluded. These were then incorporated into the Mount White Station lease. In 2007, the Arthur's Pass National Park plan recommended the inclusion of the Riversdale Flats. In late 2021, the status of whether the Riversdale Flats should remain within the Mount White lease or be incorporated into Arthur's Pass National Park was before the courts.

=== Management ===
The Department of Conservation operates a depot, administration and information centre in Arthur's Pass village. It has been proposed that facilities should be developed to encourage more visitors to stay the night. Achieving this would require more high-end accommodation and amenities to be built. The report notes that visitors peak over summer. There is a lack of longer day walk options in the park and all–weather amenities. The report also suggested that a cable car would be popular to access the tops of the mountains as would hot pools in the village and an upgraded visitor centre. The Department of Conservation had yet to make a decision on the development of Arthur's Pass National Park by June 2021.

From 2019, most international visitors to New Zealand have been charged an 'International Visitor Conservation and Tourism Levy' (IVL). At Arthur's Pass National Park, $300,000 from the IVL fund has been allocated for "delivery of a collaborative co-design approach to support the development of a well-functioning regional visitor destination".

== Geography ==
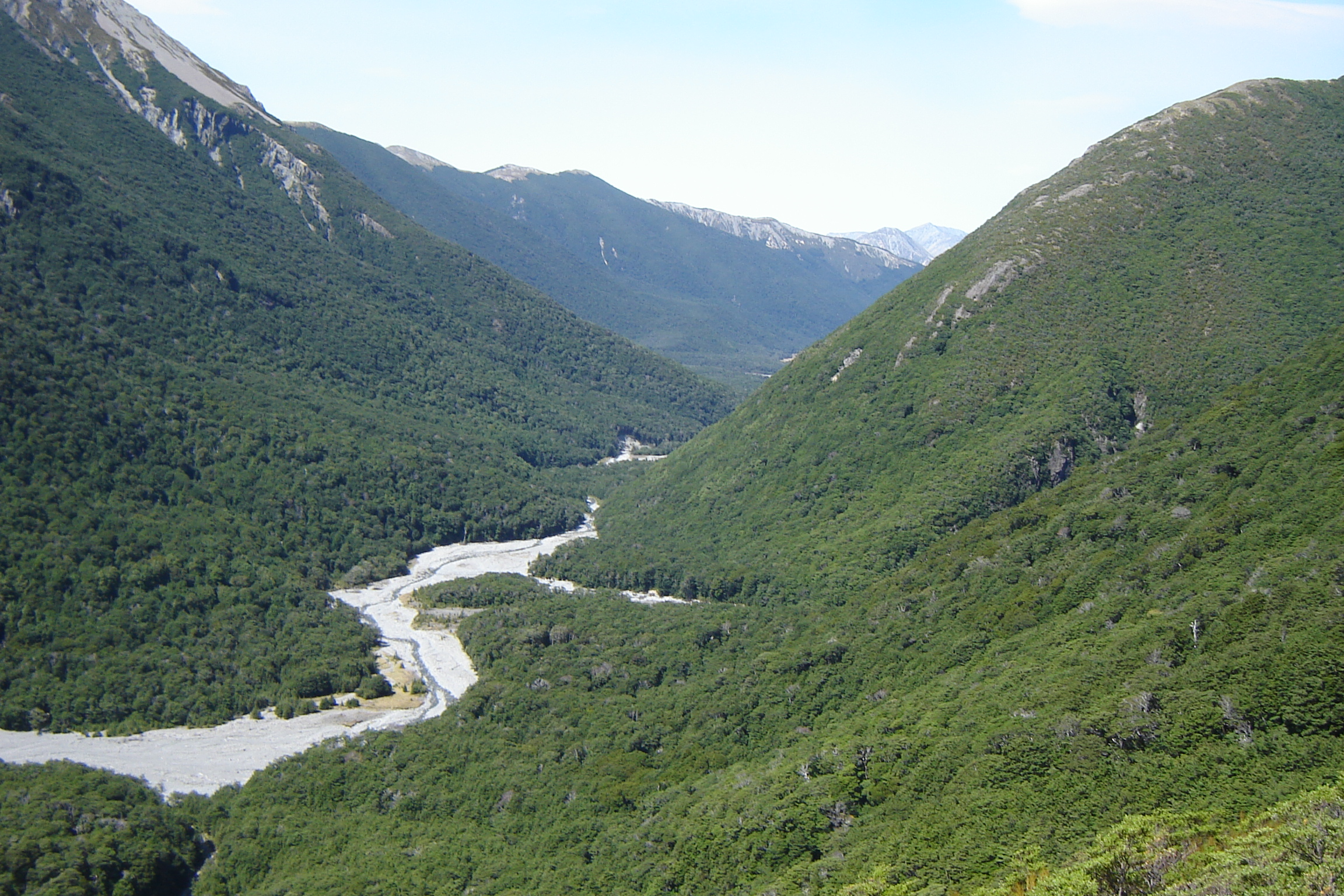
Hawdon River

Arthur′s Pass National Park is bisected by State Highway 73. The road passes through Arthur's Pass village and the mountain pass with the same name over the Southern Alps at a height of 920 metres above sea level. The National Park is located within a few hours of driving from Christchurch, the largest city on the South Island of New Zealand.

The park is split by the main divide of the South Island. The eastern side is typically drier and consists of mountain beech forest and wide riverbeds, while the western side contains dense rainforest (which includes mixed podocarp and rata). Much of the geography was formed by ancient glacial action, forming flat bottomed U-shaped valleys. In the middle is a high range, consisting of large, snow-covered peaks and scree slopes.

The park contains the following geographical features:

- A portion of the main divide of the South Island, including the following passes - Harman, Waimakariri Col, Arthur's itself, Goat (on the Mingha-Deception route), Tarahuna, Worsley, Minchin and Harper.
- The source of the Waimakariri River
- Numerous tributaries to the Waimakariri River, including the Bealey, Poulter, Hawdon, White, Crow and Anti Crow Rivers.
- Numerous tributaries to the Taramakau River, including the Ōtira, Deception and Ōtehake Rivers.
- Mt Murchison at 2400 m is the highest peak within the park.

=== Climate ===
The coldest temperature recorded in Arthurs Pass was −18.9 °C (−2 °F) at Bealey on 19 July 1878.

Climate data for Arthurs Pass Village (1991–2020 normals, extremes 1978-present)
Month	Jan	Feb	Mar	Apr	May	Jun	Jul	Aug	Sep	Oct	Nov	Dec	Year
Record high °C (°F)	32.1 (89.8)	29.5 (85.1)	26.4 (79.5)	22.5 (72.5)	17.6 (63.7)	14.0 (57.2)	12.8 (55.0)	14.3 (57.7)	20.0 (68.0)	22.5 (72.5)	26.2 (79.2)	27.6 (81.7)	32.1 (89.8)
Mean maximum °C (°F)	25.6 (78.1)	25.4 (77.7)	22.4 (72.3)	17.8 (64.0)	14.4 (57.9)	11.1 (52.0)	9.9 (49.8)	12.0 (53.6)	14.9 (58.8)	18.0 (64.4)	20.7 (69.3)	23.4 (74.1)	27.2 (81.0)
Mean daily maximum °C (°F)	18.3 (64.9)	18.6 (65.5)	16.1 (61.0)	12.7 (54.9)	9.7 (49.5)	6.7 (44.1)	6.0 (42.8)	7.6 (45.7)	9.8 (49.6)	11.7 (53.1)	13.9 (57.0)	16.5 (61.7)	12.3 (54.2)
Daily mean °C (°F)	13.3 (55.9)	13.4 (56.1)	11.2 (52.2)	8.3 (46.9)	5.8 (42.4)	3.0 (37.4)	2.2 (36.0)	3.5 (38.3)	5.5 (41.9)	7.3 (45.1)	9.3 (48.7)	11.8 (53.2)	7.9 (46.2)
Mean daily minimum °C (°F)	8.3 (46.9)	8.2 (46.8)	6.3 (43.3)	4.0 (39.2)	1.9 (35.4)	−0.6 (30.9)	−1.6 (29.1)	−0.7 (30.7)	1.3 (34.3)	3.0 (37.4)	4.7 (40.5)	7.2 (45.0)	3.5 (38.3)
Mean minimum °C (°F)	2.5 (36.5)	2.3 (36.1)	−0.4 (31.3)	−2.2 (28.0)	−3.9 (25.0)	−6.7 (19.9)	−7.5 (18.5)	−6.2 (20.8)	−4.5 (23.9)	−2.7 (27.1)	−1.4 (29.5)	1.3 (34.3)	−8.3 (17.1)
Record low °C (°F)	−1.0 (30.2)	−1.5 (29.3)	−8.5 (16.7)	−7.8 (18.0)	−7.5 (18.5)	−11.5 (11.3)	−12.5 (9.5)	−11.0 (12.2)	−8.2 (17.2)	−6.1 (21.0)	−5.0 (23.0)	−1.4 (29.5)	−12.5 (9.5)
Average rainfall mm (inches)	413.5 (16.28)	272.6 (10.73)	321.2 (12.65)	370.3 (14.58)	395.0 (15.55)	378.1 (14.89)	328.4 (12.93)	353.0 (13.90)	452.5 (17.81)	489.4 (19.27)	438.6 (17.27)	447.7 (17.63)	4,660.3 (183.49)
Source: NIWA

Climate data for Bealey (1867–1880)
Month	Jan	Feb	Mar	Apr	May	Jun	Jul	Aug	Sep	Oct	Nov	Dec	Year
Record high °C (°F)	28.3 (82.9)	29.3 (84.7)	29.2 (84.6)	23.1 (73.6)	18.3 (64.9)	14.9 (58.8)	12.4 (54.3)	14.4 (57.9)	20.6 (69.1)	23.7 (74.7)	26.3 (79.3)	29.0 (84.2)	29.3 (84.7)
Mean maximum °C (°F)	26.5 (79.7)	25.9 (78.6)	23.0 (73.4)	19.1 (66.4)	15.1 (59.2)	12.3 (54.1)	10.2 (50.4)	10.8 (51.4)	16.0 (60.8)	19.6 (67.3)	22.3 (72.1)	24.3 (75.7)	27.5 (81.5)
Mean daily maximum °C (°F)	19.2 (66.6)	18.7 (65.7)	16.9 (62.4)	13.6 (56.5)	9.6 (49.3)	6.5 (43.7)	5.6 (42.1)	6.9 (44.4)	10.5 (50.9)	12.9 (55.2)	15.0 (59.0)	17.5 (63.5)	12.7 (54.9)
Daily mean °C (°F)	13.9 (57.0)	13.5 (56.3)	12.2 (54.0)	9.3 (48.7)	5.7 (42.3)	2.8 (37.0)	1.8 (35.2)	3.0 (37.4)	6.0 (42.8)	8.3 (46.9)	10.2 (50.4)	12.7 (54.9)	8.3 (46.9)
Mean daily minimum °C (°F)	8.6 (47.5)	8.3 (46.9)	7.5 (45.5)	5.0 (41.0)	1.9 (35.4)	−0.8 (30.6)	−2.0 (28.4)	−0.7 (30.7)	1.6 (34.9)	3.7 (38.7)	5.4 (41.7)	8.0 (46.4)	3.9 (39.0)
Mean minimum °C (°F)	2.7 (36.9)	2.1 (35.8)	0.3 (32.5)	−1.8 (28.8)	−4.7 (23.5)	−8.6 (16.5)	−9.9 (14.2)	−7.1 (19.2)	−3.9 (25.0)	−2.7 (27.1)	−0.5 (31.1)	0.9 (33.6)	−11.8 (10.8)
Record low °C (°F)	0.6 (33.1)	−0.6 (30.9)	−1.7 (28.9)	−3.6 (25.5)	−10.6 (12.9)	−15.1 (4.8)	−18.9 (−2.0)	−10.3 (13.5)	−5.6 (21.9)	−9.6 (14.7)	−2.2 (28.0)	−3.9 (25.0)	−18.9 (−2.0)
Average rainfall mm (inches)	114.6 (4.51)	112.6 (4.43)	149.1 (5.87)	131.2 (5.17)	169.4 (6.67)	142.9 (5.63)	147.3 (5.80)	166.8 (6.57)	185.8 (7.31)	193.5 (7.62)	163.0 (6.42)	168.0 (6.61)	1,844.2 (72.61)
Source: NIWA (rainfall 1871-1900)

== Arthur's Park village ==
The township of Arthur's Pass is situated on State Highway 73 within the park. It has a store, visitor accommodation, restaurants and a petrol station, and is the starting point for many tracks and walks. The resident population of Arthur's Pass in 2018 was 48 people.

=== Visitor centre ===
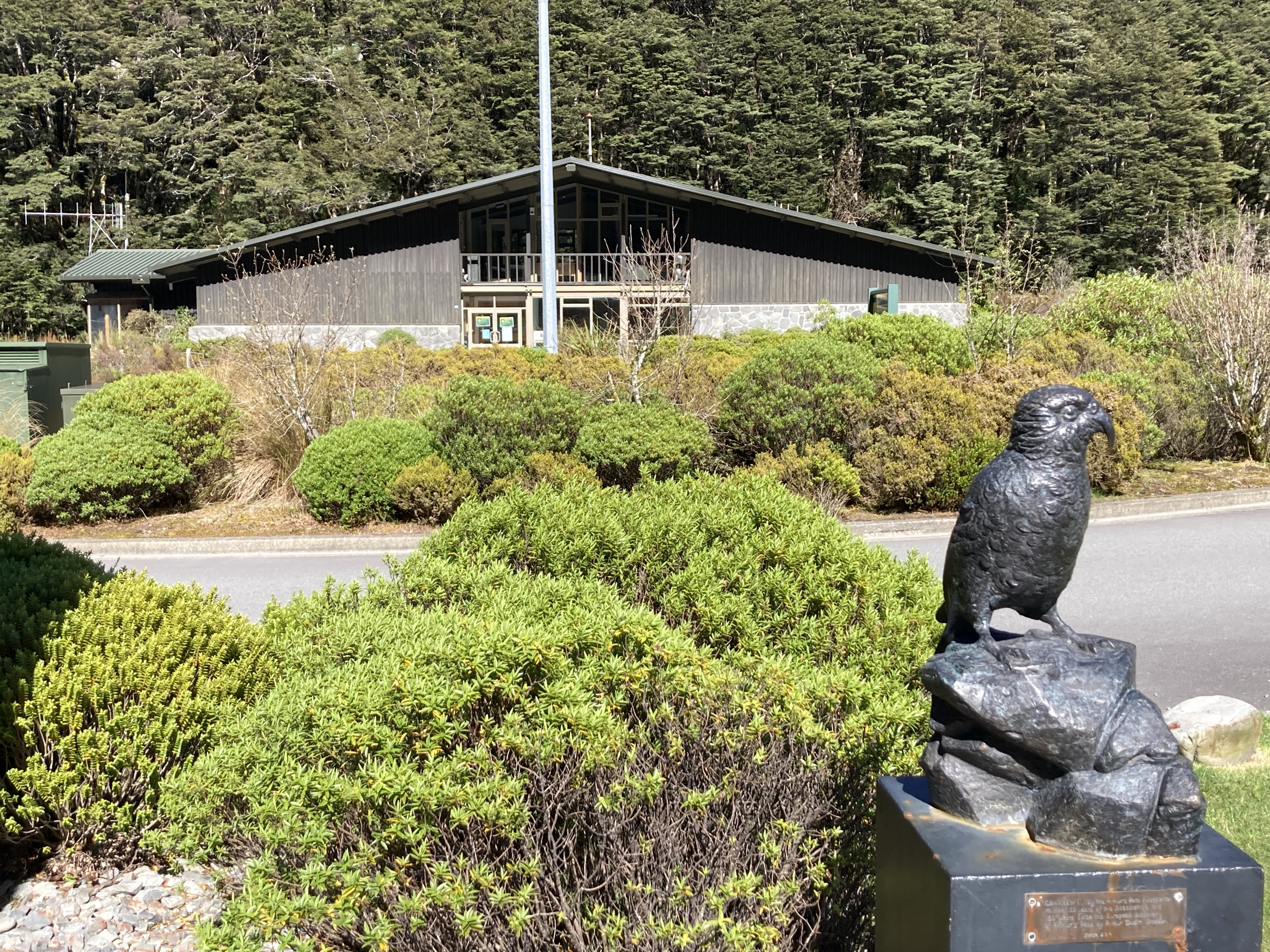
Arthurs Pass Visitor Centre (built 1959, closed 2019). The visitor centre facilities relocated to across the road.

The first national park visitor centre was built in Arthur′s Pass in 1959, with the help of the Christchurch Wanderers Tramping Club. It was designed by Christchurch architect Paul Pascoe and used local stone to reflect the geology of the national park. As well as Department of Conservation offices, the building housed museum displays on the history of Arthur's Pass (including Richard Seddon's stagecoach) and archives detailing the history of the National Park. In 2019 the building was declared earthquake prone, and the visitor centre was moved to a portacabin across the road. The cost to upgrade the building to the required standard was estimated at NZ$3 million.

== Ecology and conservation ==
=== Flora ===
The plant habitats in Arthurs Pass National Park are quite different on each side of the Main Divide. The eastern side of the park has less rainfall and braided riverbeds, supporting red beech and mountain beech forests with little understorey. Drier valley floors are dominated by grasses, sedges and tussock surrounded by shrubland of matagouri and hebes. Above the bush line are areas of snow tussock, alpine herb fields and scree slopes. The western side of the park has high rainfall, river gorges and dense rainforest.

=== Fauna ===
==== Whio (blue duck) ====
A 2004 survey found only three whio (blue ducks) in the Mingha and Deception Valley area of the park, and by 2021 it was estimated that there were fewer than 3,000 whio left in New Zealand. Seventeen birds were released into the Mingha–Deception Valley area in March 2021, and monitored stoat traps help reduce predation on them.

==== Kākāriki karaka (orange-fronted parakeet) ====
The rarest of New Zealand's kākāriki species, the orange-fronted parakeet (Cyanoramphus malherbi) has twice been declared extinct. It is only found in Arthur's Pass National Park and the Lake Sumner Forest Park and is critically endangered. The Department of Conservation works with Ngāi Tahu to protect the kākāriki karaka, which is a taonga species for the iwi. It is most commonly seen in the Hawdon and Poulter valleys. The bird nests in holes in trees, making it vulnerable to predators. Predator control has been carried out in the Arthur's Pass National Park since 2005. Since 2019, the wild population has increased from about 150-200 birds to around 360 birds.

==== Kea ====
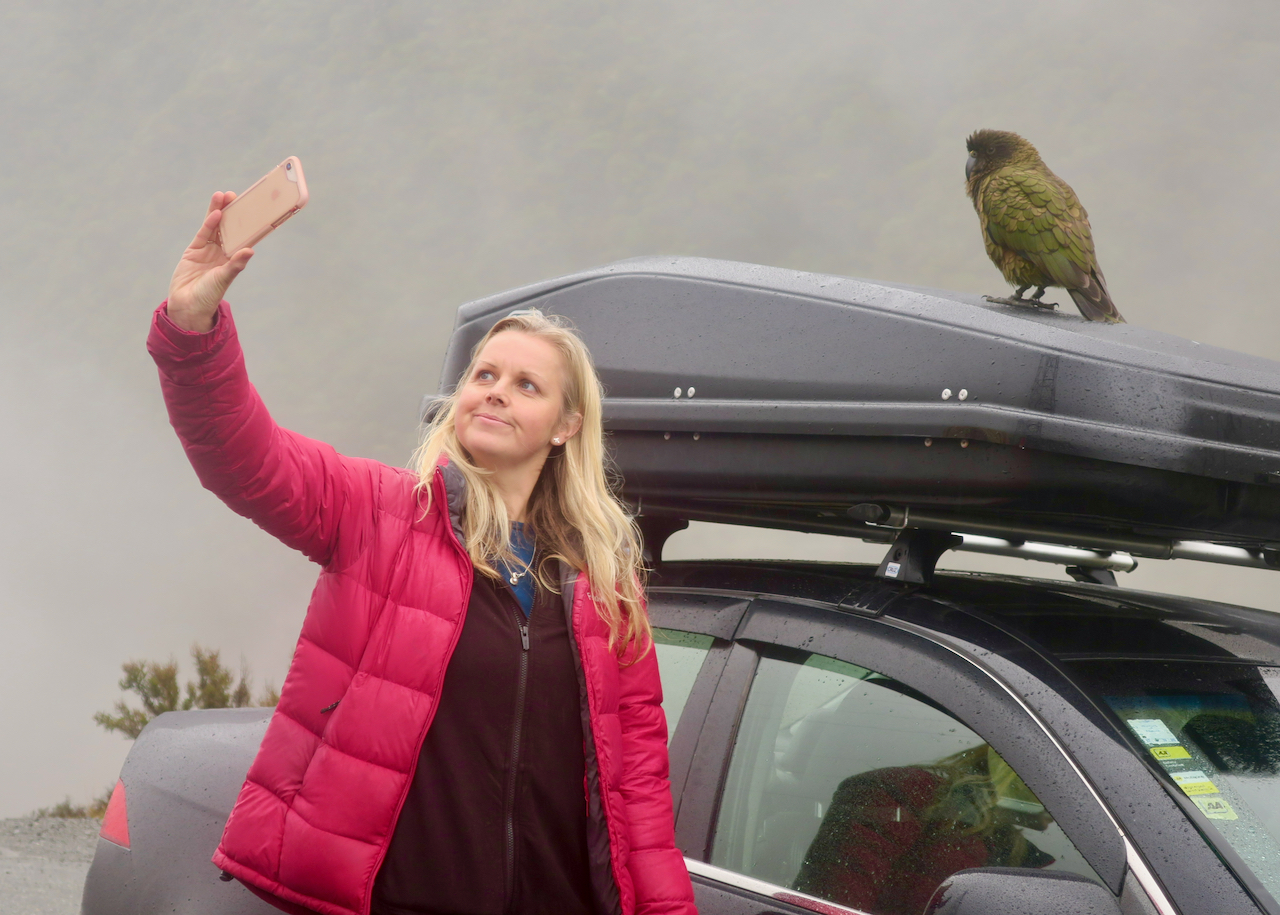
Selfie with kea in Arthur's Pass National Park car park

Kea are regularly seen in both the park and the township. Kea also visit the local ski fields (Porters, Cheeseman, Broken River, Craigieburn and Temple Basin). Kea are at risk of predation by stoats, possums and feral cats. They have also learned to interact with visitors, scavenging or scrounging food and getting into rubbish. This habituates the kea to human food and puts it at risk of eating bait laid down for predators. In 2022, The Department of Conservation and OSPRI (a company working to manage farm animal diseases) funded research near Arthur's Pass to test whether bird repellents would stop kea from interacting with 1080 bait. The year-long study showed that the repellents were ineffective.

The kea is an intelligent, curious and playful bird. When kea visit Arthur's Pass village to scavenge food, they walk across the road or perch on moving cars, sometimes falling off. A conservationist at Arthur's Pass states that between 2020 and 2022, 12 kea were killed by cars including eight in Arthur's Pass village. Visitors are encouraged not to feed kea and to dispose of their rubbish carefully.

Kea also have a habit of eating lead from building flashings and nails, which is toxic and can kill them. In 2018 a project was undertaken to remove lead from houses at Arthur's Pass to reduce the risk to kea.

==== Great spotted kiwi (roroa) ====
The great spotted kiwi or roroa (Apteryx maxima) lives in mountainous beech forest near Arthur's Pass village, which is one of three natural populations of the bird. Their habitat in the National Park means they are less prone to predation than other species of kiwi, and the total population, though classed as vulnerable, is relatively stable at around 14,000 birds. Great spotted kiwi at Arthur's Pass National Park are occasionally killed or injured by cars as they cross the road (and one was killed by a train).

==== Weka ====
Weka are becoming more common in the western side of the park and occasionally in the Edwards Valley. Weka used to be common in the park but by the 1920s had disappeared, possibly due to predation by weasels. From 1961, there were several attempts to reintroduce weka to the Andrews Valley, Taramakau Valley and Poulter Valley areas in the park with birds sourced from the Chatham Islands and the West Coast. In 1968 it was announced that West Coast weka appeared to have been successfully re-established in the Taramakau Valley. Further sightings in the next few years confirmed that the population was growing. They have slowly expanded their territory and predator control has allowed the population to expand towards Arthur's Pass Village.

==== Mohua (yellowhead) ====
The mohua or yellowhead is a small bird that nests and roosts in holes in trees. It was formerly common in South Island beech forests, but populations in the Arthur's Pass area declined by the 1980s due to predation by rats and stoats. The remaining small population was wiped out in 1999–2000 when predator numbers increased dramatically after the beech trees produced huge numbers of seeds (known as a beech mast). In 2022, the Department of Conservation released 41 birds into the Poulter Valley in Arthur's Pass National Park in an attempt to re-establish the mohua population. In 2025 a large beech mast was predicted, so the Department of Conservation increased its predator control efforts in the park and other locations.

==== Introduced mammals ====
Trail cameras show that deer, pigs, possums, feral cats, stoats and mice have been seen at Arthur's Pass. These animals threaten native wildlife in various ways: habitat destruction, eating birds or their eggs, and eating the food sources of native birds. For example, it was discovered that feral cats in the park eat short-horned grasshoppers (Acrididae). The Department of Conservation controls rats, stoats and possums in the park using aerial drops of 1080 (sodium fluoroacetate) and ground control methods such as traps and toxins in bait stations.

== Recreation ==
Bridal Veil Falls

The park is popular for tramping, skiing, hunting and mountaineering. The mountains around Arthur's Pass contain very challenging terrain. The peaks are highly exposed to the weather, the tracks are often very steep, and are often marked only by poles strung across a rocky landscape. Below the tree line the bush is dense and thick. In common with many alpine areas the weather is subject to frequent and sudden change. There have been numerous incidents where trampers have been unprepared for the harsh and variable conditions, and Arthur's Pass National Park consequently has a reputation as one of the most dangerous national parks in New Zealand.

=== Mountain huts ===
The Department of Conservation provides 31 mountain huts in Arthur's Pass National Park, on both sides of the Main Divide. For a small fee, the huts provide shelter and basic facilities for trampers, climbers and others visiting the mountains. There are also privately-owned huts or lodges in the area.

=== Avalanche Peak ===
Avalanche Peak is the only peak in Arthur's Pass National Park that is marked by a poled route to the summit. The route is steep and climbs 1,100 metres vertical from the Arthur's Pass village. On a clear day, there are good views of the Southern Alps.

=== Devils Punchbowl waterfall ===
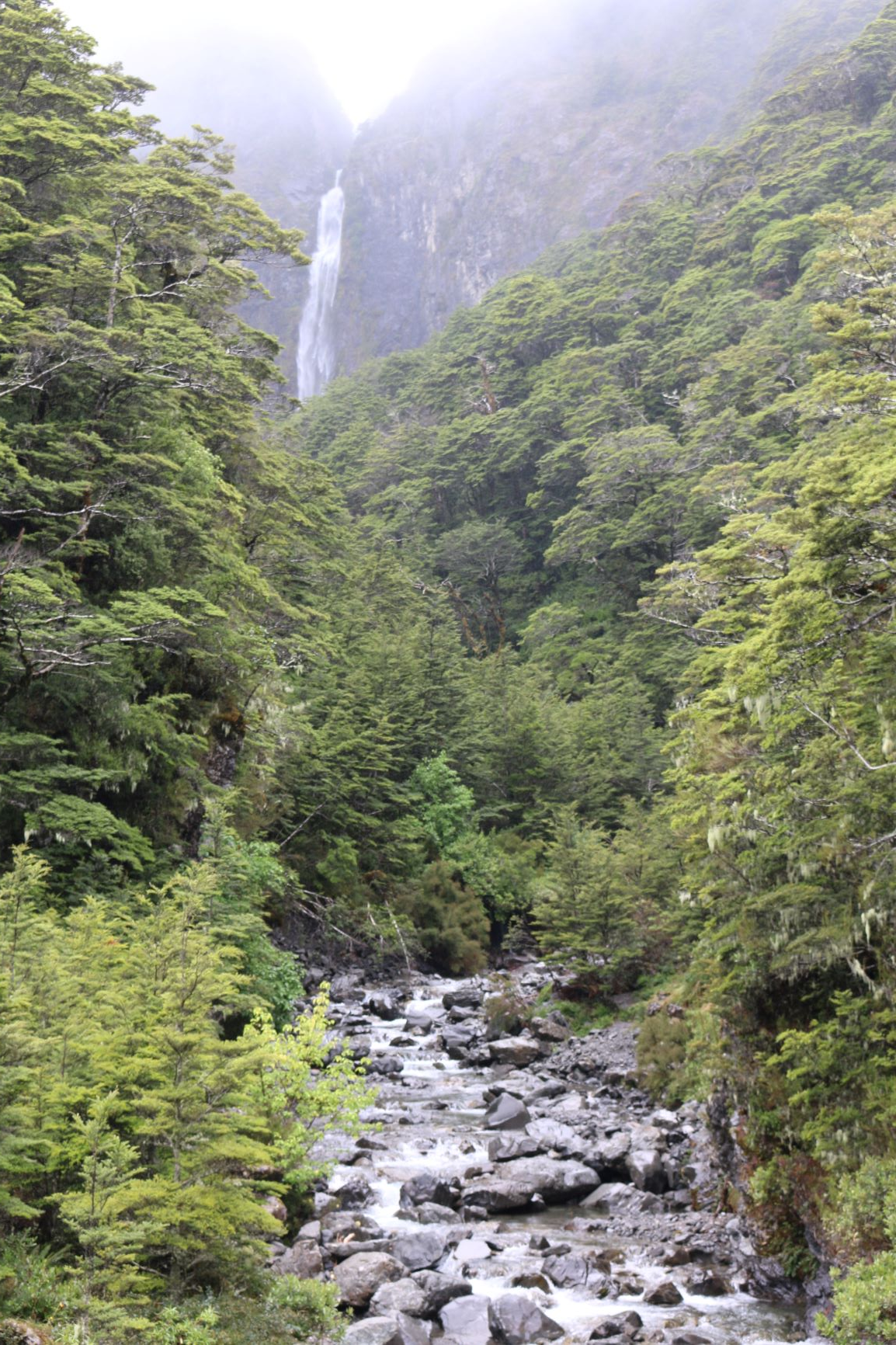
Devils Punchbowl waterfall

The Devils Punchbowl waterfall is located close to the northern end of Arthur′s Pass Village. The short walk through beech forest to the waterfall and back can be completed in under two hours. The track climbs a well maintained track to the base of the 131 metre waterfall, where there is a viewing platform.

=== Mount Rolleston ===
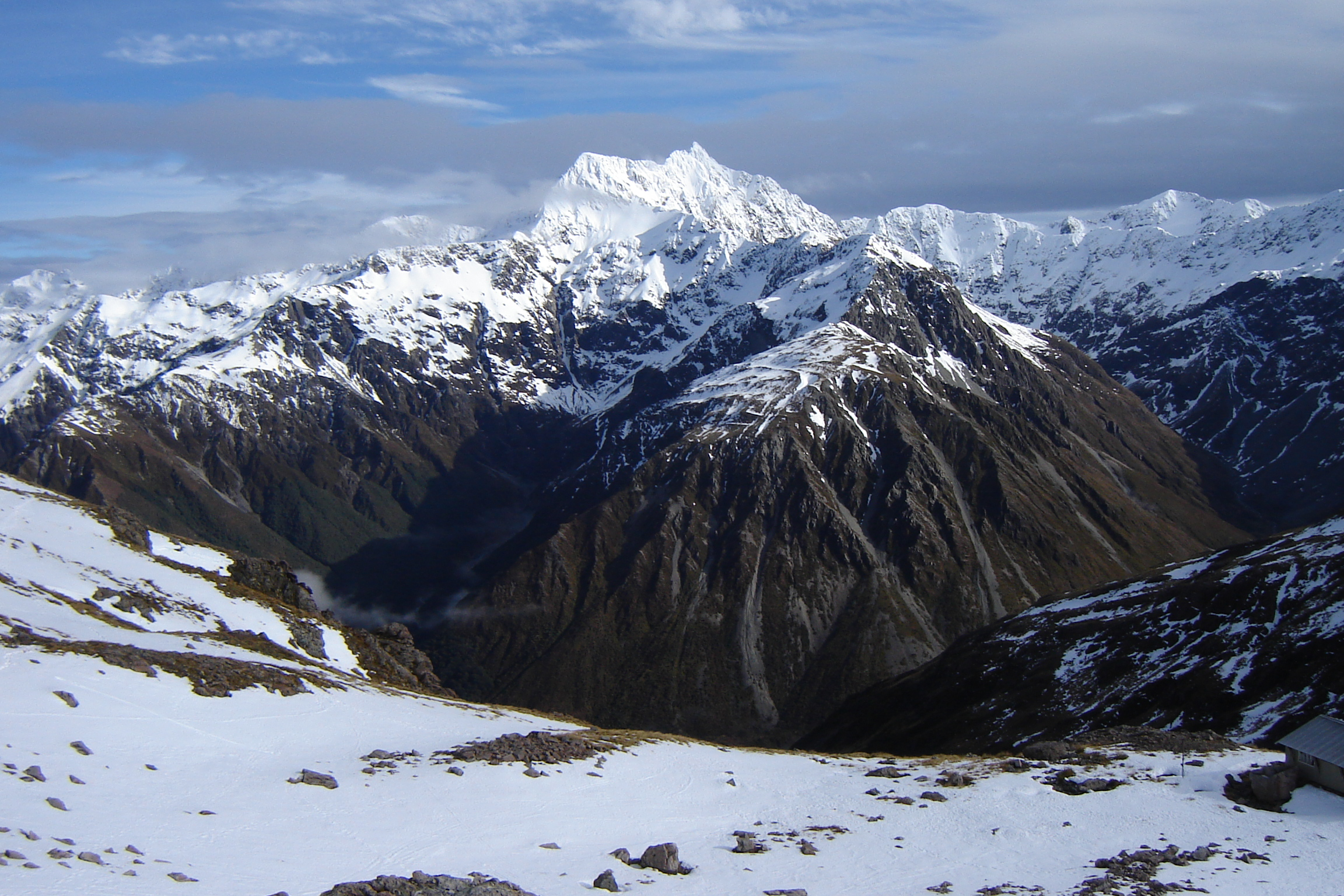
Mount Rolleston (2009)

Mount Rolleston is one of the highest peaks in the National Park. it is 2271 meters tall. It is a popular mountain to climb and there are multiple ways to climb it The Rolleston Glacier has melted significantly and the degree of the melt in 2011 would be a 1-in-100-year event under natural conditions, but due to climate change this has become a 1-in-8-year event.

=== Bealey Spur track ===
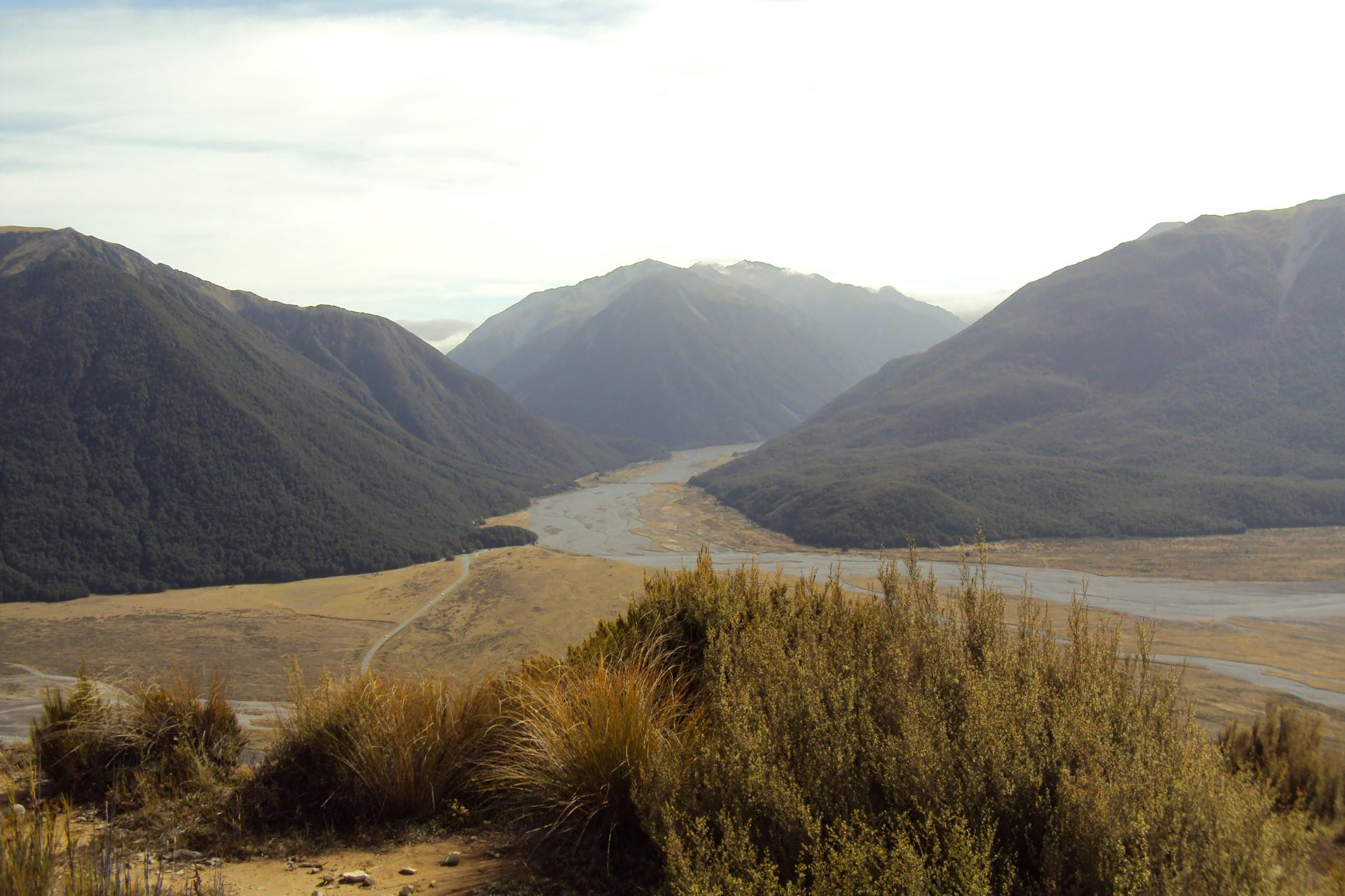
View of the Arthurs Pass National Park from the Bealey Spur track

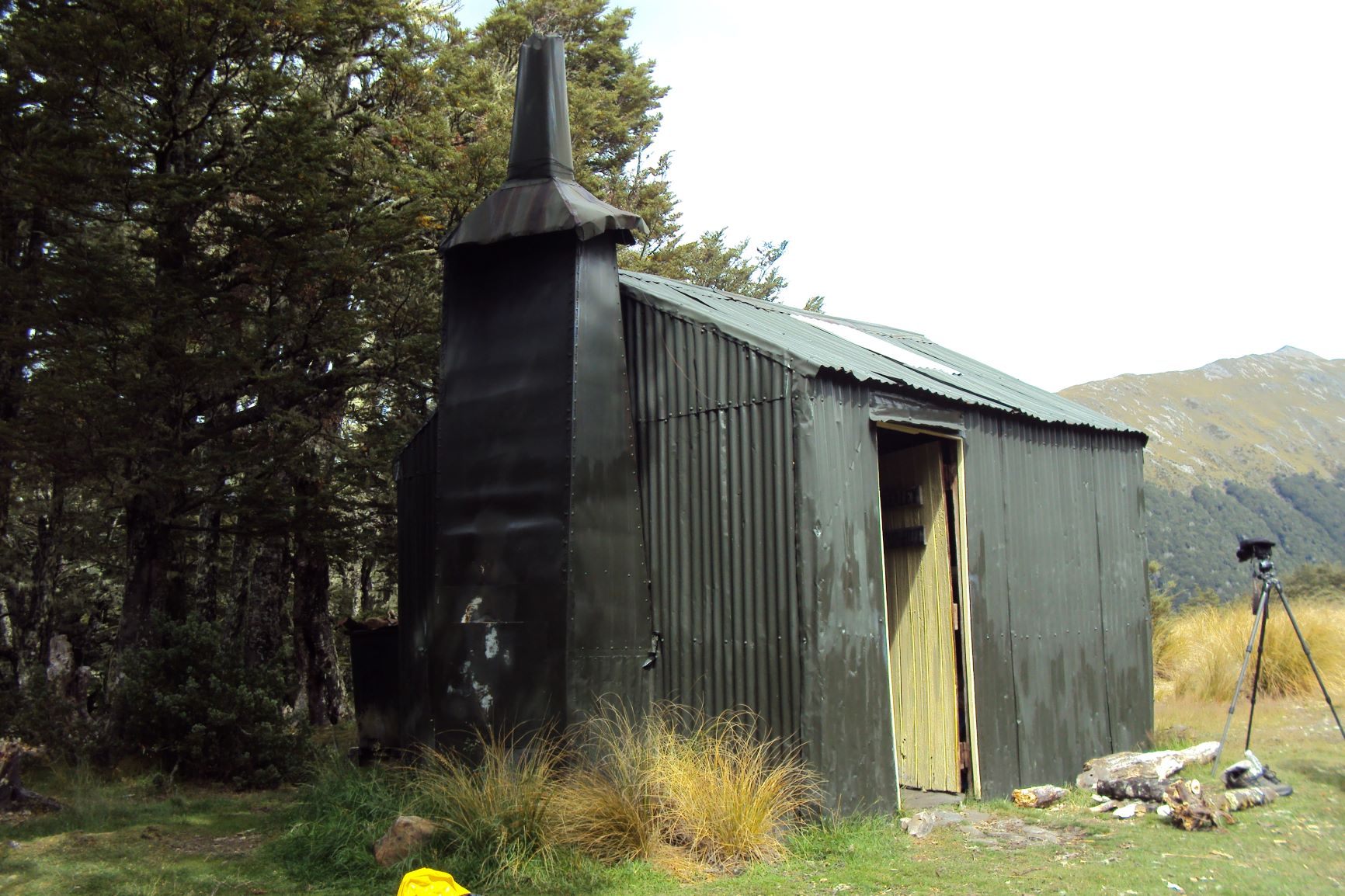
Bealey Spur Hut

This is a popular day trip within Arthur's Pass National Park. It is an easy 2.5 hour walk up to the Bealey Spur Hut, with views over the Wamaikariri Basin and surrounding mountains.

=== Waimakariri Basin ===
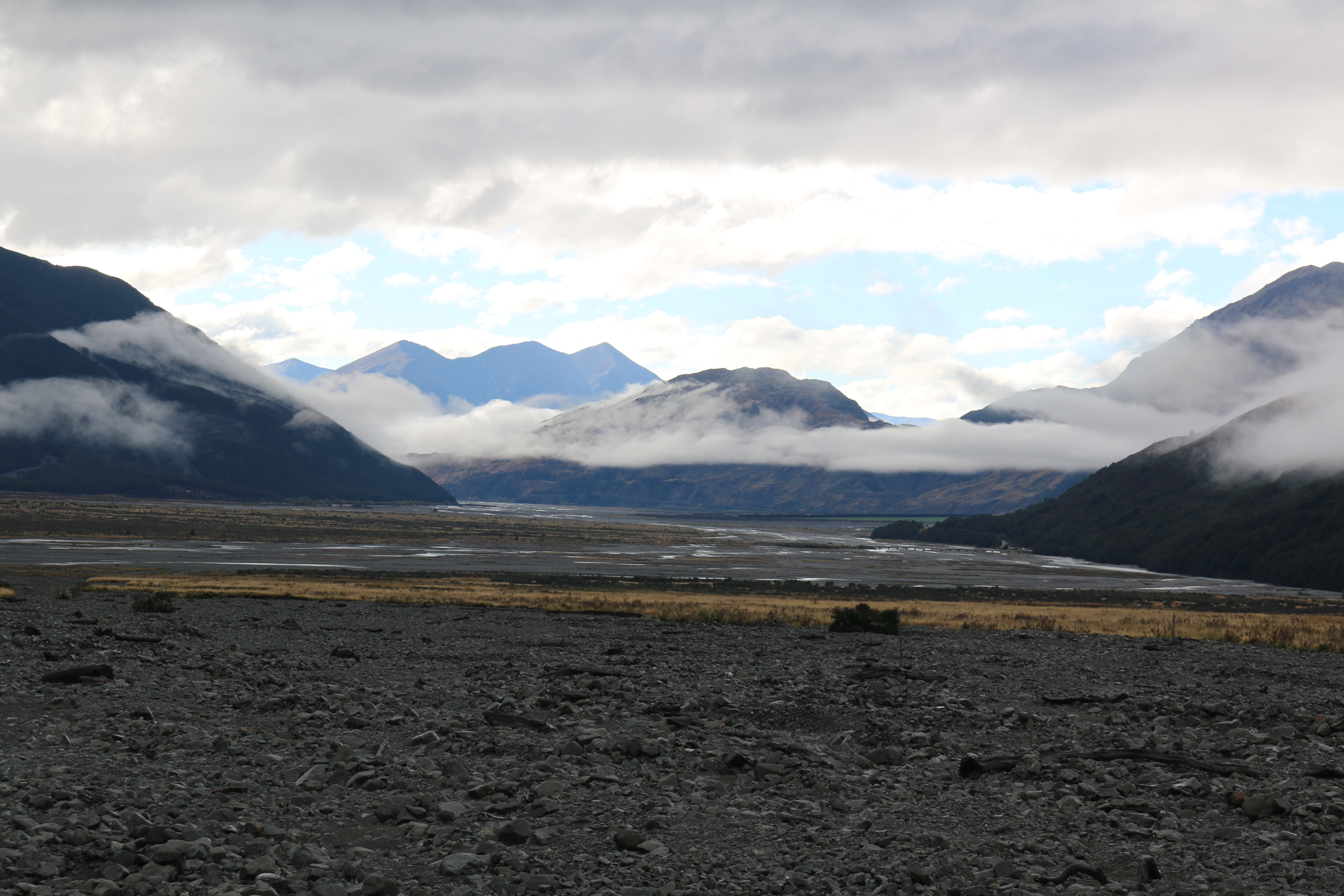
Waimakariri basin

O'Malleys track starts at State Highway 73 and follows the Waimakariri River, crossing Turkey Flat to Anti Crow Hut then on to Carrington Hut. This takes the average fit walker five hours. From Carrington Hut, it is possible to climb Harman Pass (1315m) and cross the Southern Alps. Another trip from Carrington Hut is to continue following the Waimakariri River to Waimakariri Falls Hut, at 1,290 metres above sea level. Various mountaineering trips can be taken from here into the higher mountains of the National Park. From Anti Crow Hut it is also possible to cross the Wamakariri River and walk up the Crow river towards Crow Hut which sits at 1020 metres above sea level.

=== Edwards-Hawdon track ===
This challenging tramping trip travels up the Edwards River, crosses two alpine passes and then travels down the Hawdon River. The Department of Conservation describes it as "...best of Arthur's Pass National Park's stunning alpine landscapes. The hanging valley at Walker Pass is reached via Taruahuna Pass and the steep climb up to Tarn Col". This is typically a two night and three day tramp with stops at Edwards Hut and Hawdon Hut. It is suitable for very experienced tramping groups only.

=== Andrews-Poulter track ===
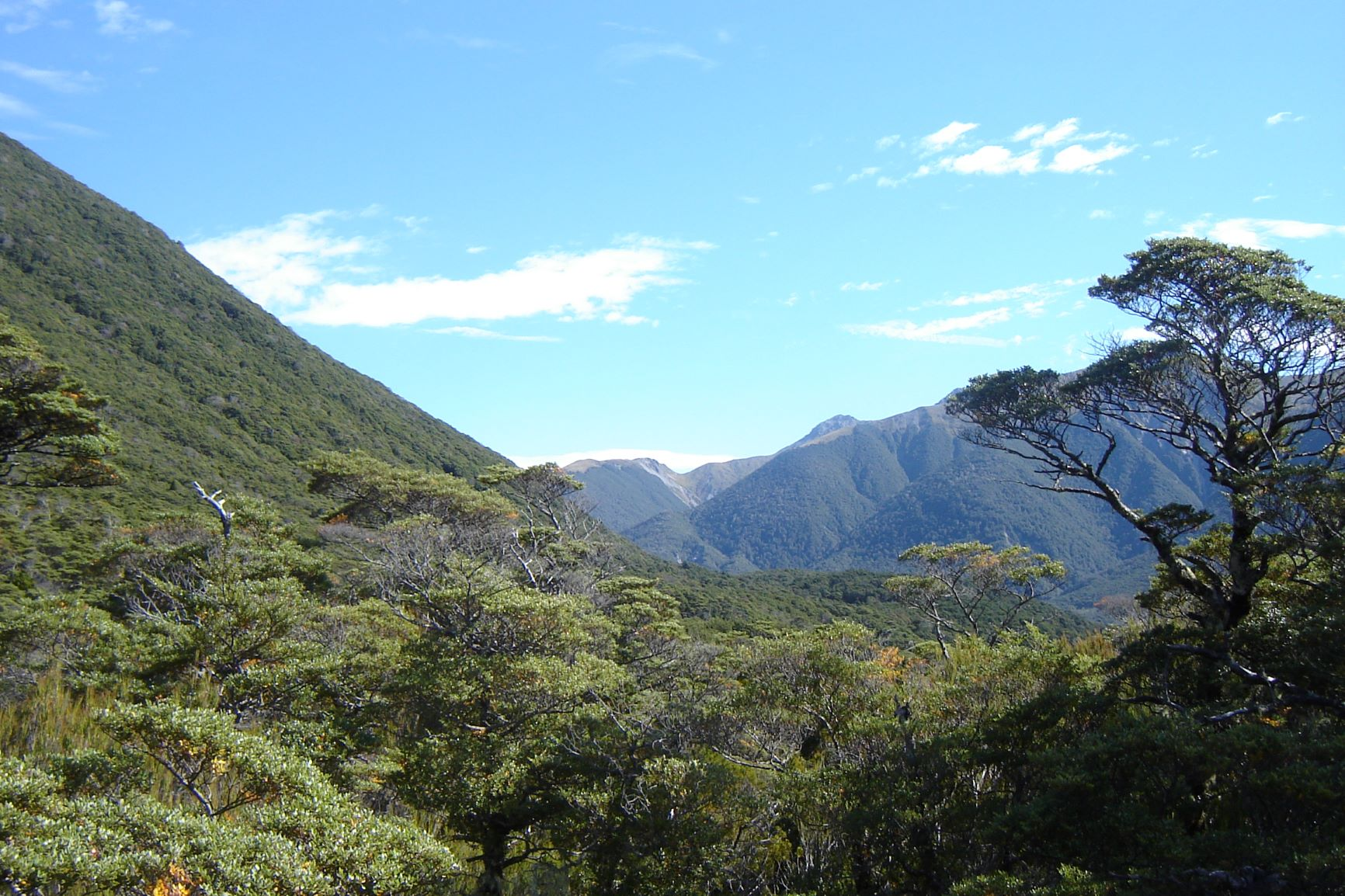
Beech Forest on the Andrews-Poulter tramp

The Andrews-Poulter is a popular non-technical trip on the eastern side of Arthur′s Pass National Park. It crosses two passes, the first being the Casey saddle which is surrounded by beech forest. From there, the track leads to Casey Hut. The second day travels along the river flats of the Poulter before climbing through the beech forest to the Binser saddle and then descending to the carpark near the Andrews shelter in the Mt White road.

The Casey Hut built in 1969 burnt down in October 2015. In 2019, two anonymous donors provided $250,000 for the hut to be rebuilt, and in August 2020 the replacement Casey Hut was opened.

=== Mingha-Deception track ===
This is a well known tramping trip that travels up the Mingha river to Goat Pass. Goat Pass hut is located at the pass. The second day involves travel down the Deception river and multiple river crossings. It is possible to complete a side trip to Lake Mavis from Goat Pass. This trip is used as the mountain run for the Coast to Coast race in the reverse direction. Pest control (trapping stoats, weasels, rats and feral cats) occurs along this route as part of the Blue Duck Recovery Programme.

=== Carroll Hut track ===
The Carroll Hut Track is on the West Coast side of Arthur′s Pass National Park, 3 kilometres north of Otira on State Highway 73 at Kellys Creek. The tramp to the hut takes around three hours. It is a steep climb through podocarp and broadleaf forest, providing good views of the Taramakau River on a clear day. The trip back from the hut to the road takes 90 minutes.

== See also ==
- National parks of New Zealand
- Forest parks of New Zealand
- Regional parks of New Zealand
- Protected areas of New Zealand
- Tramping in New Zealand
- Conservation in New Zealand
- Department of Conservation (New Zealand)
