= Mauka Atua =

Mountain in New Zealand

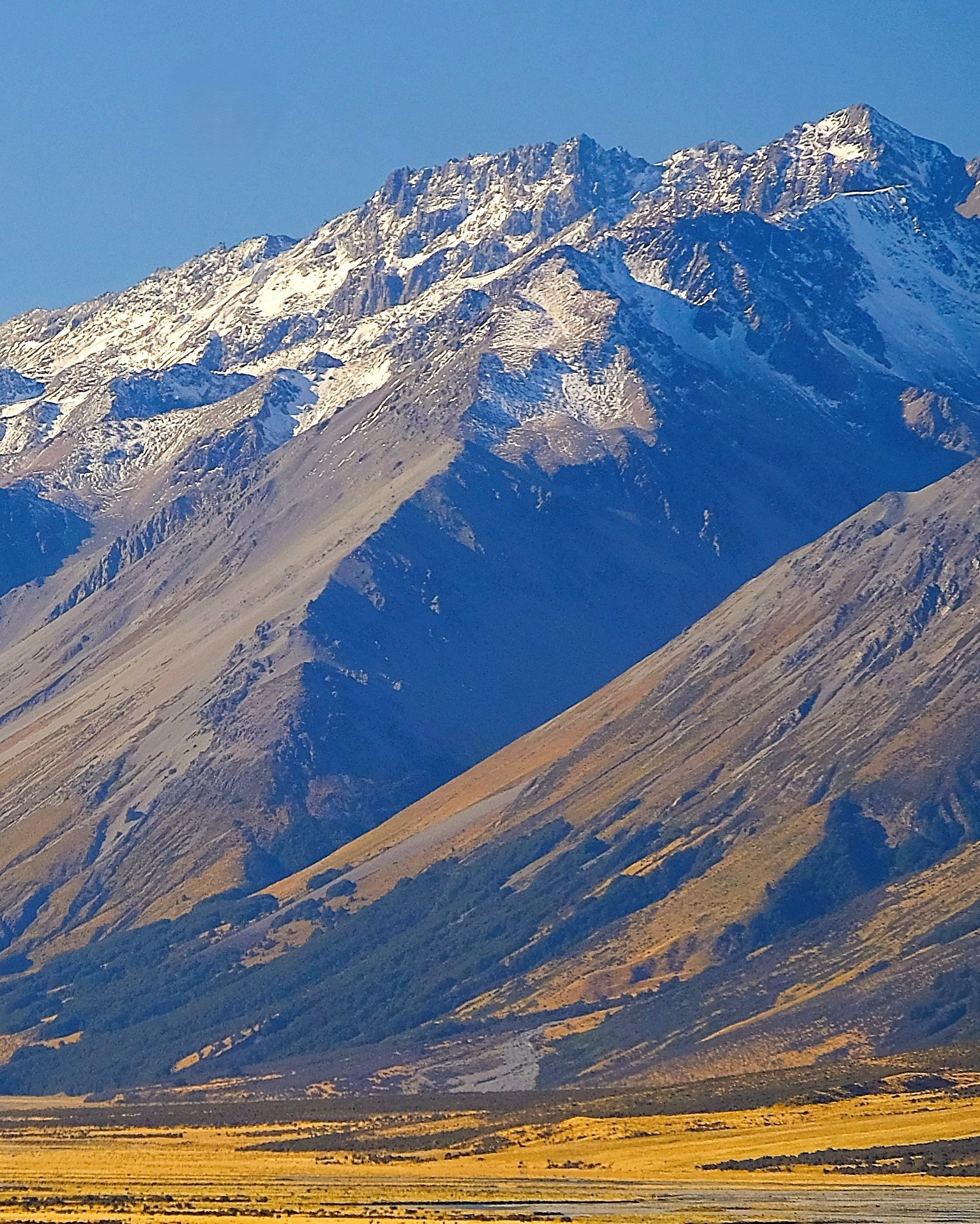
- South aspect

Highest point
- Elevation: 2,557 m (8,389 ft)
- Prominence: 537 m (1,762 ft)
- Isolation: 10.72 km (6.66 mi)
- Listing: New Zealand #56
- Coordinates: 43.878717°S 170.024264°E

Geography
- Location within New Zealand
- Interactive map of Mauka Atua
- Location: South Island
- Country: New Zealand
- Region: Canterbury
- Parent range: Southern Alps; Ben Ohau Range
- Topo map: Topo50 BY15

Geology
- Rock age: Triassic
- Rock type: Semischist of Rakaia Terrane

Climbing
- First ascent: 1948

Mauka Atua is a 2,557-metre-elevation (8,389-foot) mountain in the Canterbury Region of New Zealand.

== Description ==
Mauka Atua is located 225 kilometres (140 mi) southwest of Christchurch and set between the Dobson Valley and Tasman Valley in the South Island. It is the highest peak in the Ben Ohau Range of the Southern Alps. Precipitation runoff from the mountain drains east to Lake Pukaki and west into the Dobson River. Topographic relief is significant as the summit rises 1,820 metres (5,971 feet) above the Dobson Valley in four kilometres. The nearest higher peak is Mount Hopkins, 11 kilometres to the north-northwest. The mountain's name Mauka Atua means "to stand apart" in the Māori language and the toponym has been officially approved by the New Zealand Geographic Board.

== Climbing ==
Climbing routes with first ascents:

- South Ridge – Norman Hardie – (1948)
- East Face – Ross Cullen – (March 1989)
- North Ridge – Hugh Nicholson – (January 1996)

== Climate ==
Based on the Köppen climate classification, Mauka Atua is located in a marine west coast (Cfb) climate zone, with a subpolar oceanic climate (Cfc) at the summit. Prevailing westerly winds blow moist air from the Tasman Sea onto the mountains, where the air is forced upwards by the mountains (orographic lift), causing moisture to drop in the form of rain or snow. The months of December through February offer the most favourable weather for viewing or climbing this peak.

== See also ==
- List of mountains of New Zealand by height
