= Mount Cran =

Mountain in Canterbury, New Zealand

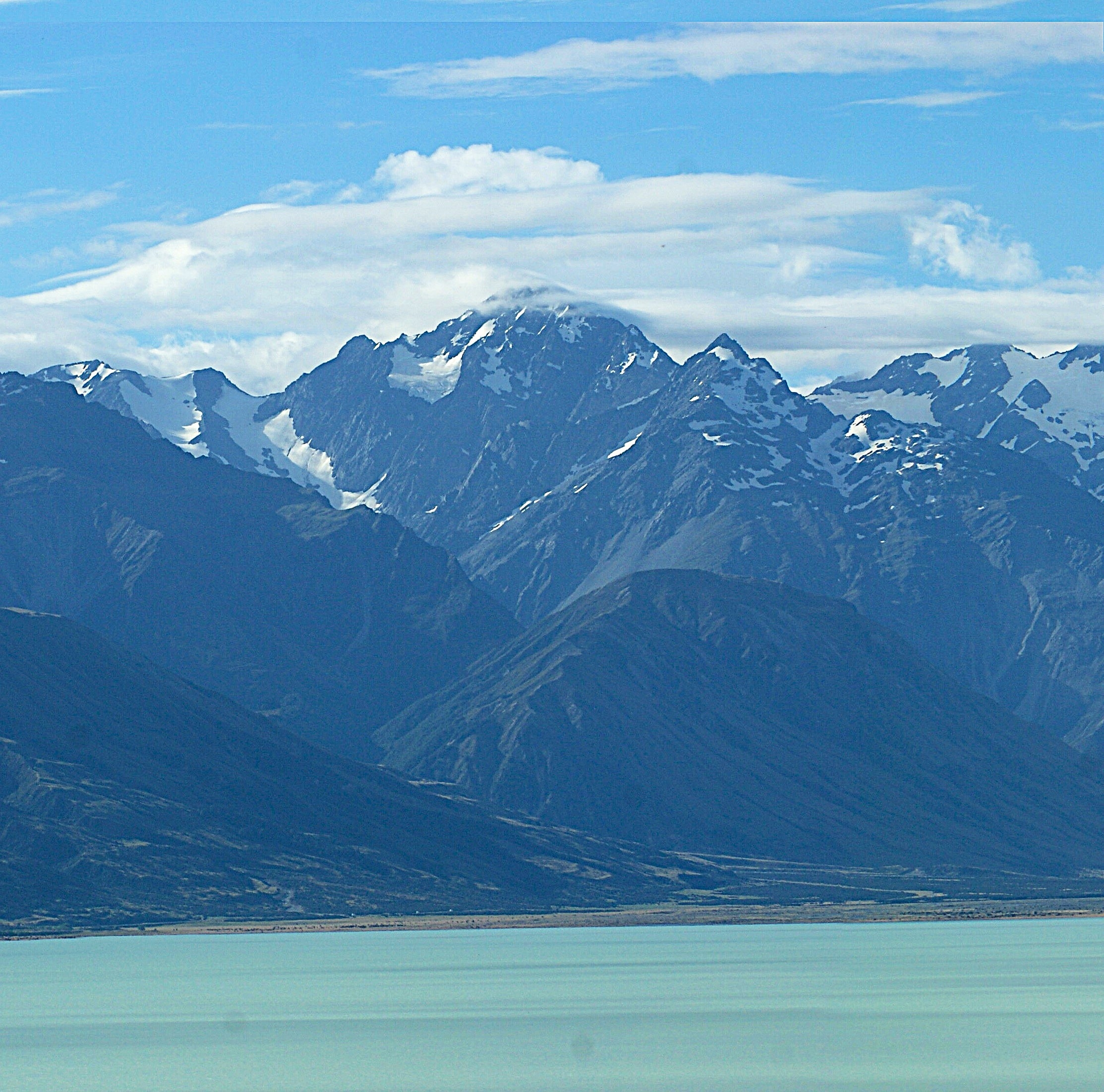
- Southeast aspect

Highest point
- Elevation: 2,444 m (8,018 ft)
- Prominence: 264 m (866 ft)
- Isolation: 4.35 km (2.70 mi)
- Coordinates: 43.8055°S 170.0527°E

Naming
- Etymology: Charles George Cran

Geography
- Location within New Zealand
- Interactive map of Mount Cran
- Location: South Island
- Country: New Zealand
- Region: Canterbury
- Parent range: Southern Alps; Ben Ohau Range
- Topo map: Topo50 BY15

Climbing
- First ascent: March 1916

Mount Cran is a 2,444-metre-elevation (8,018-foot) mountain in Canterbury, New Zealand.

== Description ==
Mount Cran is in the Ben Ohau Range of the Southern Alps on New Zealand's South Island, within the Canterbury Region. The peak is located seven kilometres (4.3 mi) south of Mount Cook Village. Runoff from the mountain's northwest slopes drains to the headwaters of the Dobson River, whereas drainage from the other slopes flows east to the Tasman River via Freds Stream and Birch Hill Stream. Topographic relief is significant, with the summit rising 1,440 metres (4,720 feet) above Birch Hill Stream over a horizontal distance of two kilometres (1.2 mi). The nearest higher peak is Mount Sealy, approximately four kilometres (2.5 mi) to the north. The summit was first climbed in March 1916 by Harold Sloman and Conrad Kain.

== Eponymy ==
The mountain's toponym honours Charles George Cran (1899–1985), who was well-known in the farming community, managed several high-country stations, and was an original member of the Land Settlement Board. This mountain's toponym has been officially approved by the New Zealand Geographic Board.

== Climbing ==
Climbing routes with first ascents:

- East Ridge – Harold Sloman, Conrad Kain – (1916)
- North Ridge – Mike Andrews, Mal Clarborough, Jim Jolly – (1972)
- East Face – Ross Cullen, Peter Fowler – (1990)
- Deep Purple – Bill McLeod – (1994)
- Feared By The Bad – Bill McLeod – (1995)
- Monkey Puzzle – Bill McLeod – (1995)
- Delirium – Jonathon Baird, Bill McLeod – (1996)
- Central Couloir – Steve Fortune, Jaap Overtoom, Duncan Sherratt – (2005)
- West Ridge – FA unknown

== Climate ==
Based on the Köppen climate classification, Mount Cran is located in a marine west coast (Cfb) climate zone, with a subpolar oceanic climate (Cfc) at the summit. Prevailing westerly winds blow moist air from the Tasman Sea onto the mountains, where the air is forced upward by the mountains (orographic lift), causing moisture to drop in the form of rain or snow. This climate supports a small unnamed glacier on the peak's northwest slope. The months of December through February offer the most favourable weather for viewing or climbing this peak.

== Gallery ==
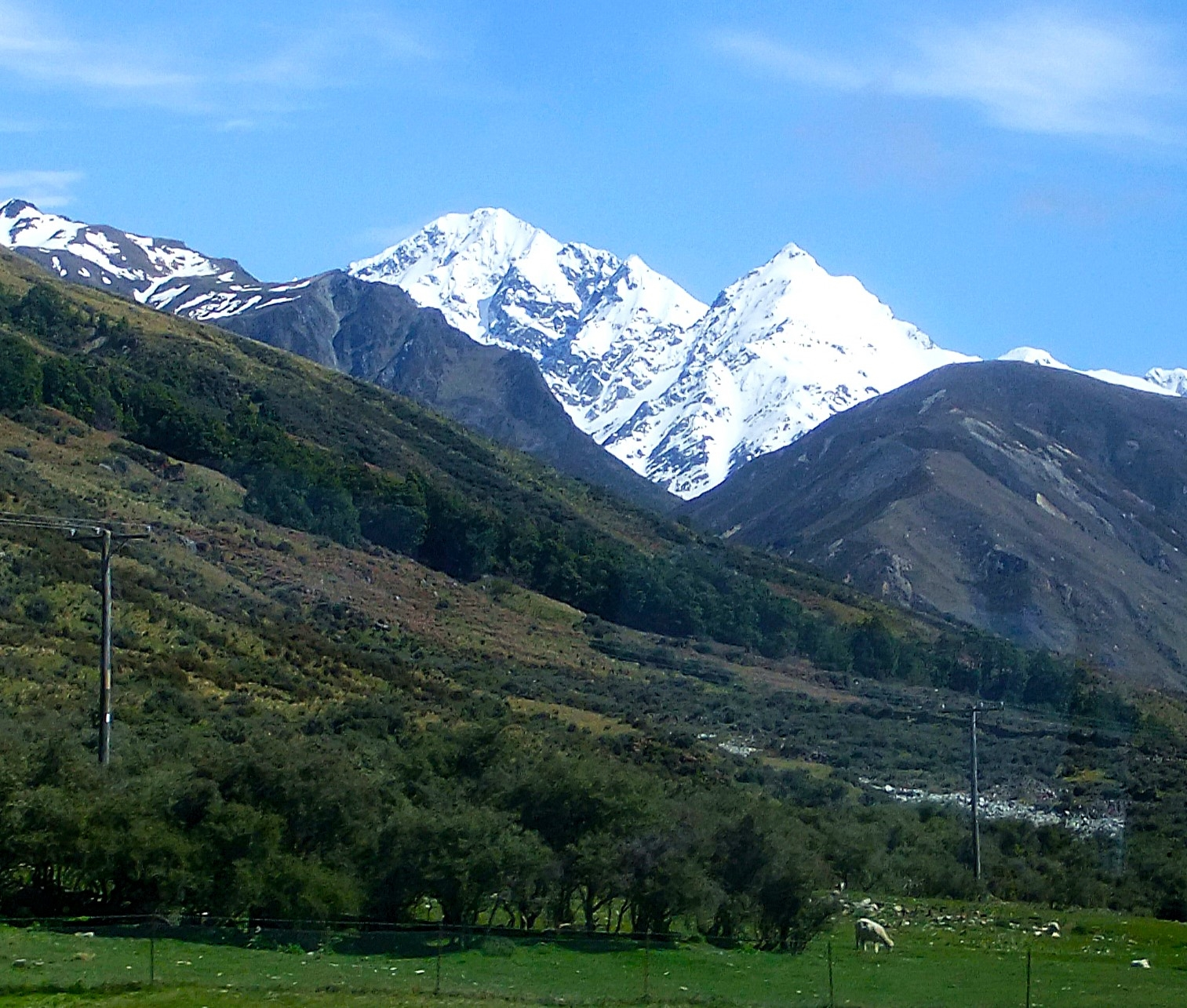
Mount Cran and Mount Lloyd (right) from Mount Cook Road

== See also ==
- List of mountains of New Zealand by height
