= Ben Ohau Range =

Mountain range in New Zealand

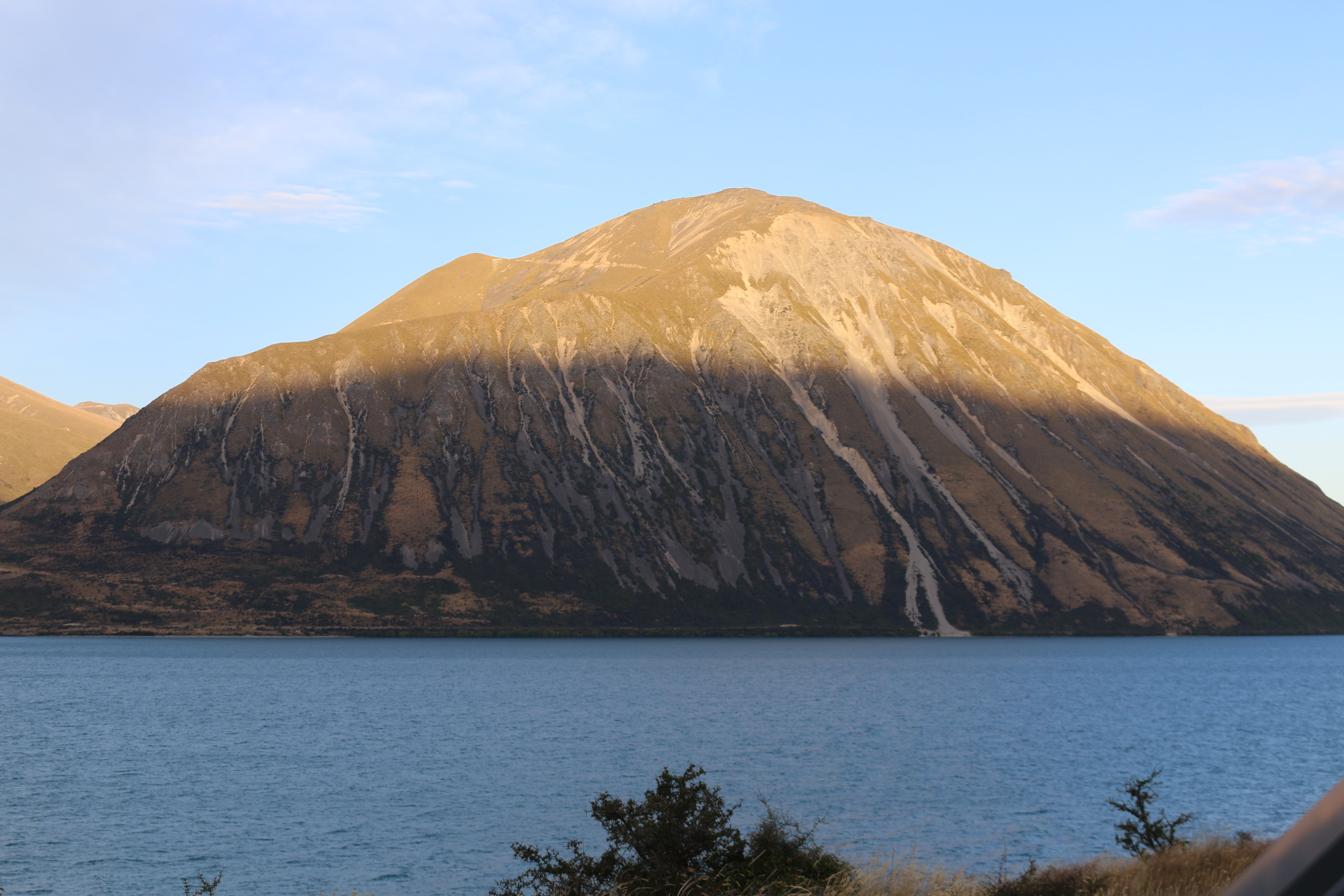
Ben Ohau

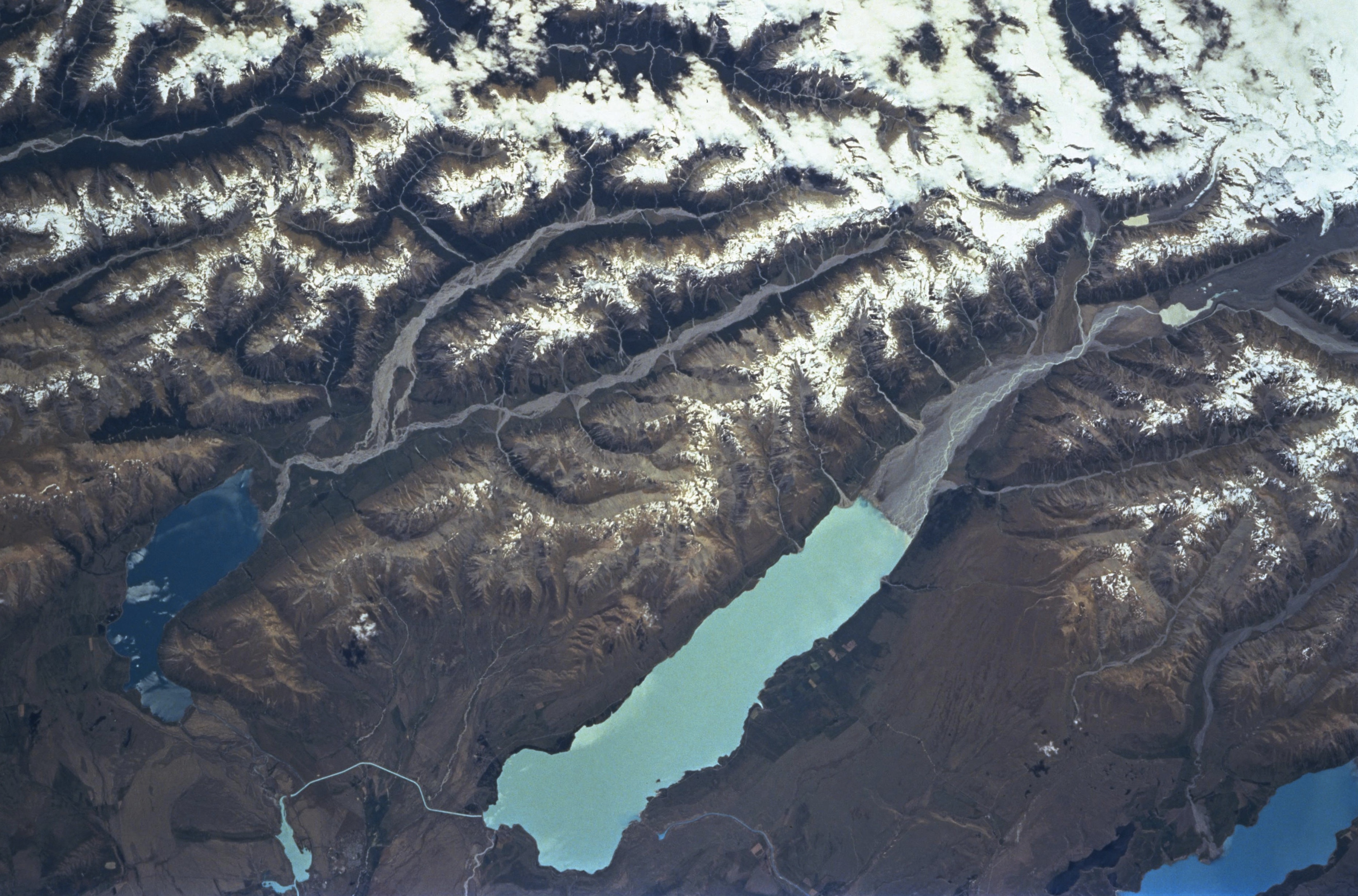
A photo showing Ben Ohau Range (Centre) taken from The International Space Station

Ben Ohau Range is a mountain range in Canterbury Region, South Island, New Zealand. It lies west of Lake Pukaki, at 44°S 170°E and east of the Dobson river and Lake Ōhau.

The Ben Ohau range is dominated at the southern end by Ben Ohau (1522m). Other mountains in the range include Backbone Peak (2263m), MacKenzies Peak (2200m), Glentanner Peak (2551m), Dun Fiunary (2550m), Ferintosh Peak (2497m), Mauka Atua (2557m), Kai Tarau (2542m), and Mt Dark (2496m). At the northern end Mt Cran stands at 2444m, Jamieson Saddle at 2183m and Mt Edgar Thomson at 2379m.

== Biodiversity ==
The moth species Ichneutica agorastis is particularly common at a string mires found in the Ben Ohau Range.
