= Aiguilles Rouges (New Zealand) =

Mountain in New Zealand

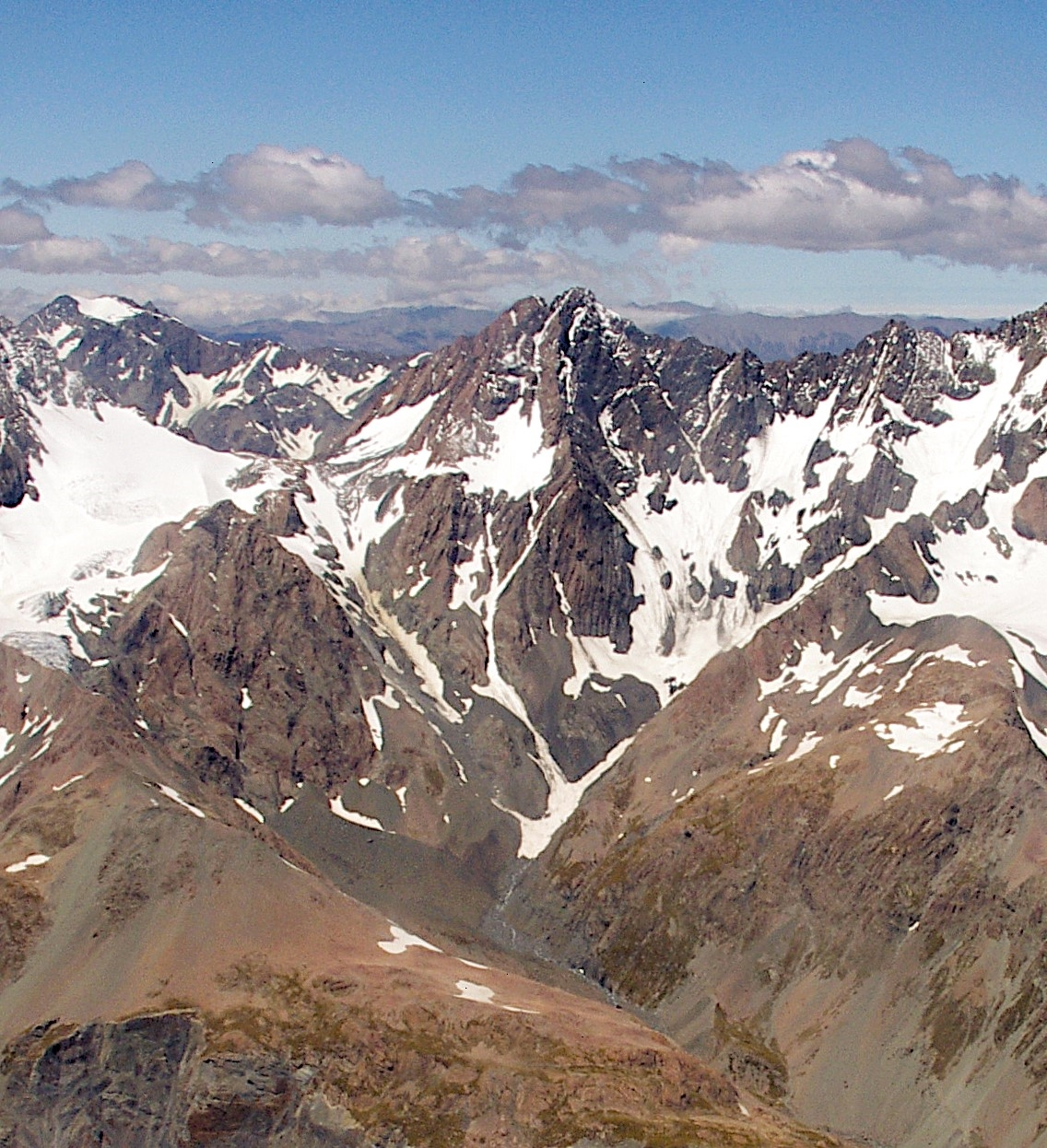
- Northwest aspect

Highest point
- Elevation: 2,950 m (9,678 ft)
- Prominence: 230 m (755 ft)
- Isolation: 1.53 km (0.95 mi)
- Listing: Mountains of New Zealand
- Coordinates: 43°34′39″S 170°17′30″E

Naming
- Etymology: Aiguilles Rouges (Red Needles)

Geography
- Location within New Zealand
- Interactive map of Aiguilles Rouges
- Location: South Island
- Country: New Zealand
- Region: Canterbury
- Protected area: Aoraki / Mount Cook National Park
- Parent range: Southern Alps; Malte Brun Range
- Topo map(s): NZMS260 I36; Topo50 BX16

Climbing
- First ascent: March 1909

Aiguilles Rouges is a 2,950-metre-elevation (9,678-foot) mountain in the Canterbury Region of New Zealand.

== Description ==
Aiguilles Rouges is set in the Malte Brun Range of the Southern Alps and is situated in the Canterbury Region of South Island. This remote peak is located 12 kilometres (7.5 mi) east-northeast of Aoraki / Mount Cook in Aoraki / Mount Cook National Park. Topographic relief is significant as the summit rises over 1,900 metres (6,234 feet) above the Murchison Valley in three kilometres. Precipitation runoff from the mountain drains to the Tasman River. The nearest higher peak is Mount Chudleigh, 1.53 kilometres to the southwest. The first ascent of the summit was made in March 1909 by Peter Graham and Laurence Earle. The mountain's toponym was applied by Laurence Earle who named the peak after Aiguilles Rouges in the French Prealps. The translation from French is "Red Needles."

== Climbing ==
Climbing routes and the first ascents:

- North Ridge – Laurence Earle, Peter Graham – (1909)
- North East Ridge (descent) – Laurence Earle, Peter Graham – (1909)
- North East Flank – Freda Du Faur, Peter Graham – (1913)
- East Ridge – M.J.P. Glasgow, Harry Stevenson – (1951)
- West Ridge – Ian Cave, Mike Gill, John Nichols – (1960)
- South Face – Dave Bamford, John Nankervis – (1980)
- Intermediate Ridge – Ross Cullen, Chris Knol – (1982)
- Central Gully – Ako Groot, Hawke Groot – (1991)
- Tiddley Pom – Jo Kippax, Sean Waters – (1992)

== Climate ==
Based on the Köppen climate classification, Aiguilles Rouges is located in a marine west coast (Cfb) climate zone, with a subpolar oceanic climate (Cfc) at the summit. Prevailing westerly winds blow moist air from the Tasman Sea onto the mountains, where the air is forced upward by the mountains (orographic lift), causing moisture to drop in the form of rain or snow. This climate supports the Beetham, Cascade, Onslow, and Barkley glaciers surrounding the peak. The months of December through February offer the most favourable weather for viewing or climbing this peak.

== Gallery ==
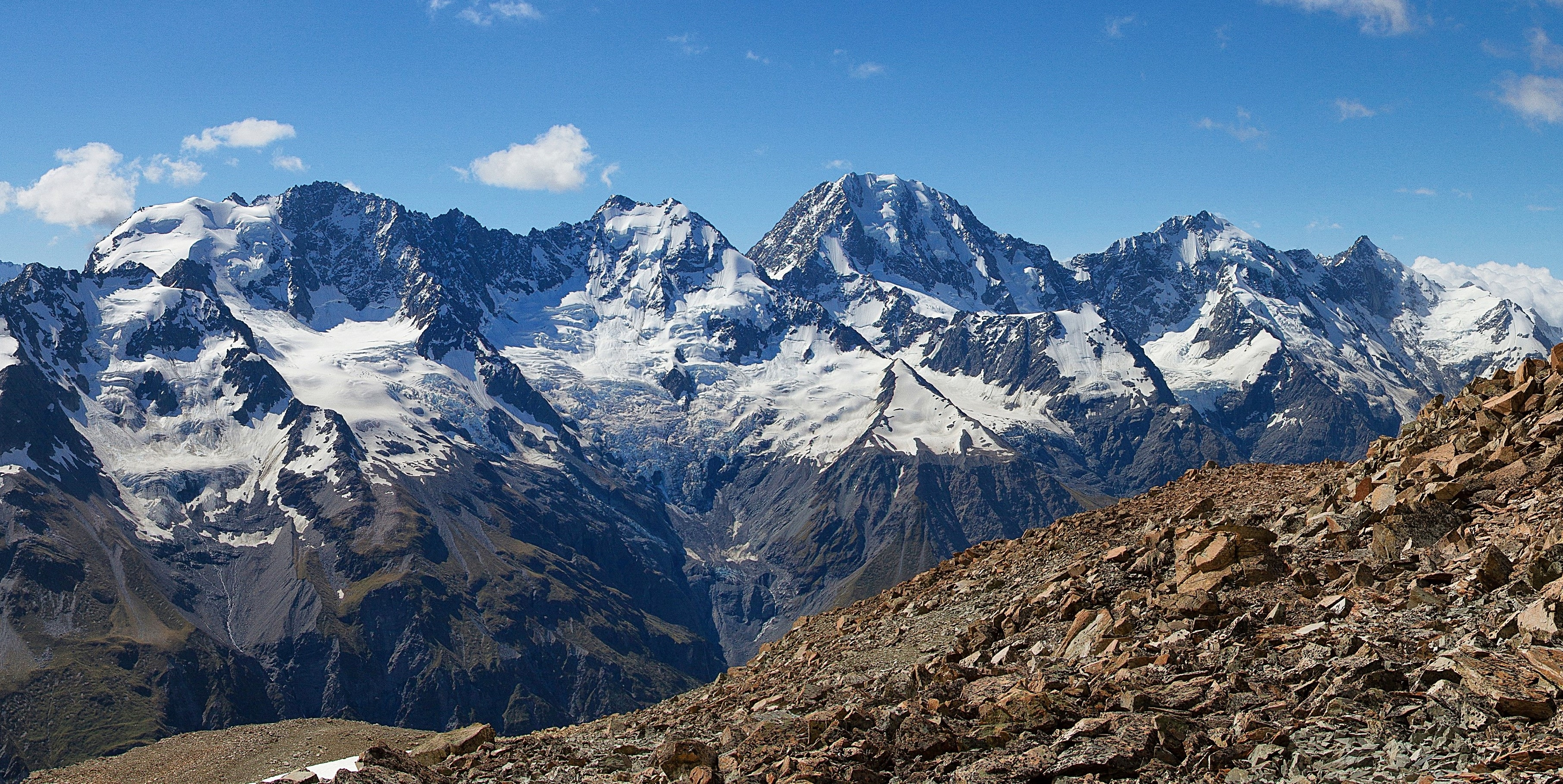
South aspect of Malte Brun Range. L→Rː Chudleigh, Aiguilles Rouges, Malte Brun, Hamilton, Haeckel Peak.

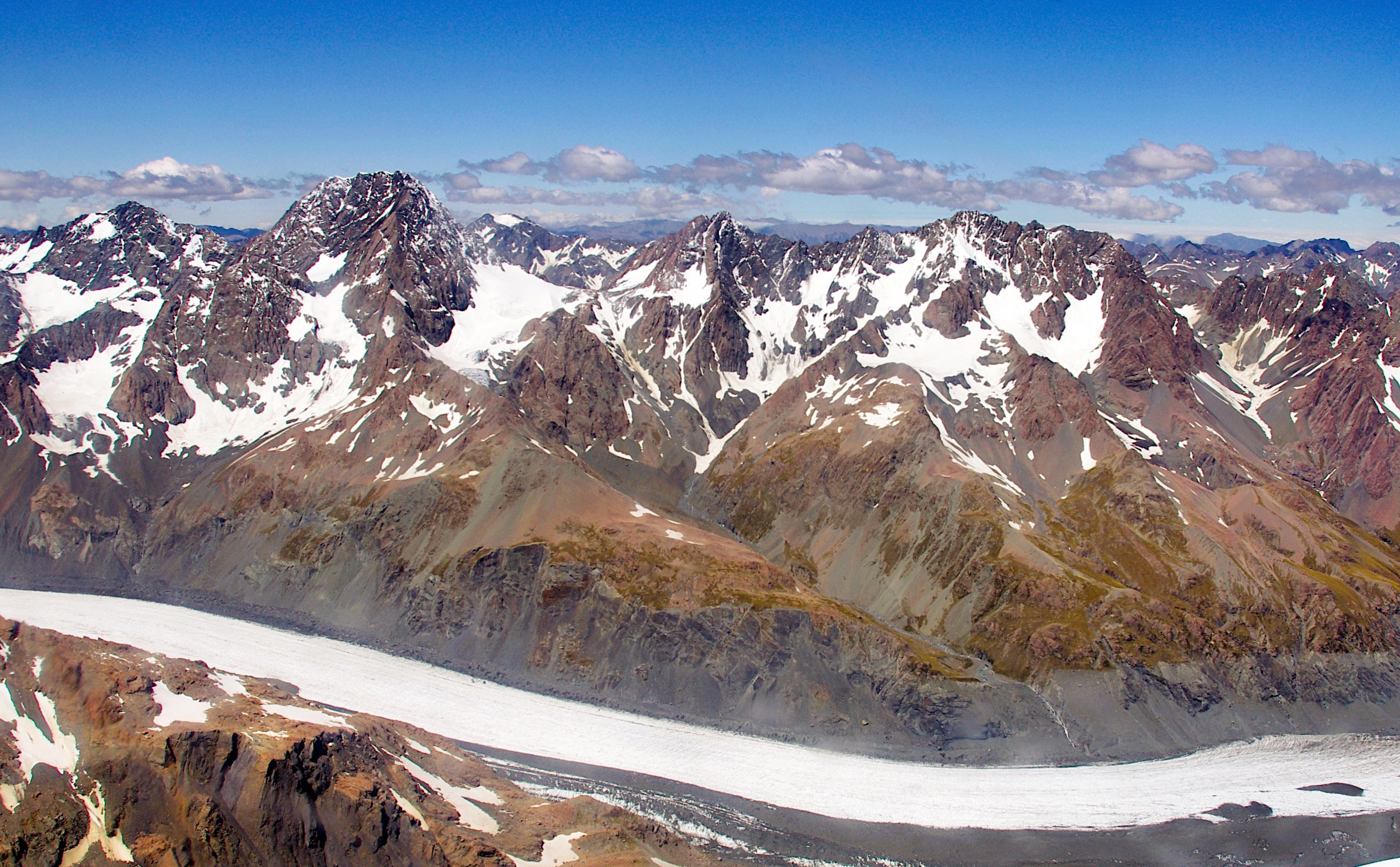
Malte Brun Range and Tasman Glacier with Aiguilles Rouges centred, Malte Brun (left) and Mount Chudleigh (right)

== See also ==
- List of mountains of New Zealand by height
