= Faur =

Faur or Du Faur is a surname associated with the occupation of blacksmith. Notable people with the surname include:

- Christian Wilhelm von Faber du Faur (1780–1857), Württemberger painter and army officer
- David Levi-Faur, Israeli political scientist and academic
- Freda Du Faur (1882–1935), Australian mountaineer, first woman to climb New Zealand's tallest mountain
- Guy Du Faur, Seigneur de Pibrac (1529–1584), French jurist and poet
- José Faur (1934–2020), Argentine Sephardic Hakham (rabbi), teacher and scholar
- Louis-François Faur (1746–1829), French librettist, playwright and man of letters
- Remus Faur (born 1989), Romanian biathlete

== See also ==
- Du Faur Creek, New South Wales, Australia
- Du Faur Peak, New Zealand
- Faur București, Romanian football club
