= Du Faur Peak =

Mountain in Canterbury, New Zealand

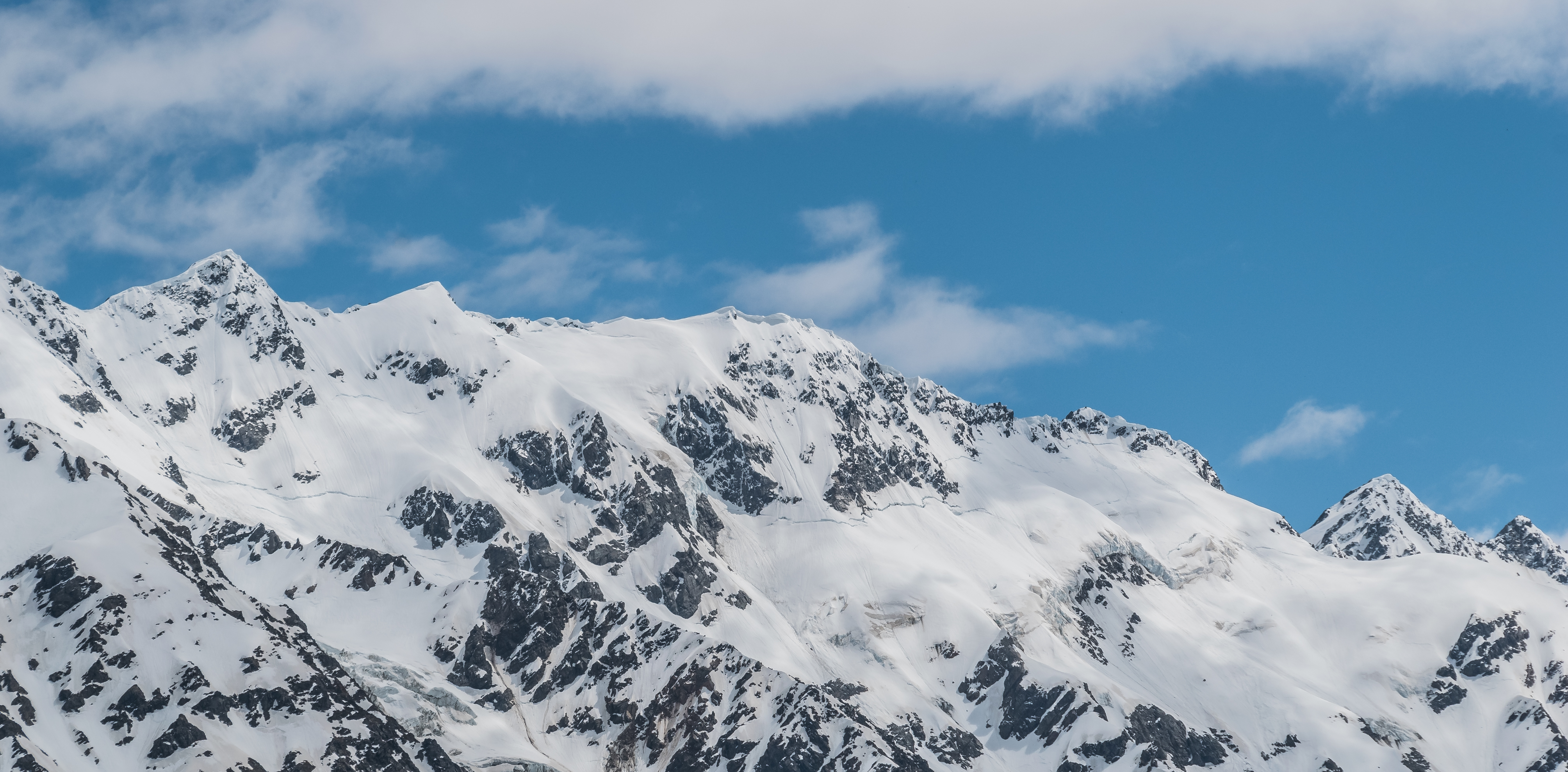
- South aspect, centred

Highest point
- Elevation: 2,330 m (7,644 ft)
- Coordinates: 43.66402°S 170.08416°E

Naming
- Etymology: Freda Du Faur

Geography
- Location within New Zealand
- Interactive map of Du Faur Peak
- Location: South Island
- Country: New Zealand
- Region: Canterbury / West Coast
- Protected area: Aoraki / Mount Cook National Park; Westland Tai Poutini National Park
- Parent range: Southern Alps
- Topo map(s): NZMS260 H36; Topo50 BX15

Climbing
- First ascent: 1912

Du Faur Peak is a 2,330-metre-elevation (7,644-foot) mountain in New Zealand.

== Description ==
Du Faur Peak is situated on the crest or Main Divide of the Southern Alps and set on the common boundary shared by the Canterbury and West Coast Regions of the South Island. It is located seven kilometres north of Mount Cook Village and set on the boundary shared by Aoraki / Mount Cook National Park and Westland Tai Poutini National Park. Precipitation runoff from the mountain drains west into the Copland River and east into Hooker Lake. Topographic relief is significant as the summit rises 1,450 metres (4,757 feet) above Hooker Lake in two kilometres.

== Etymology ==
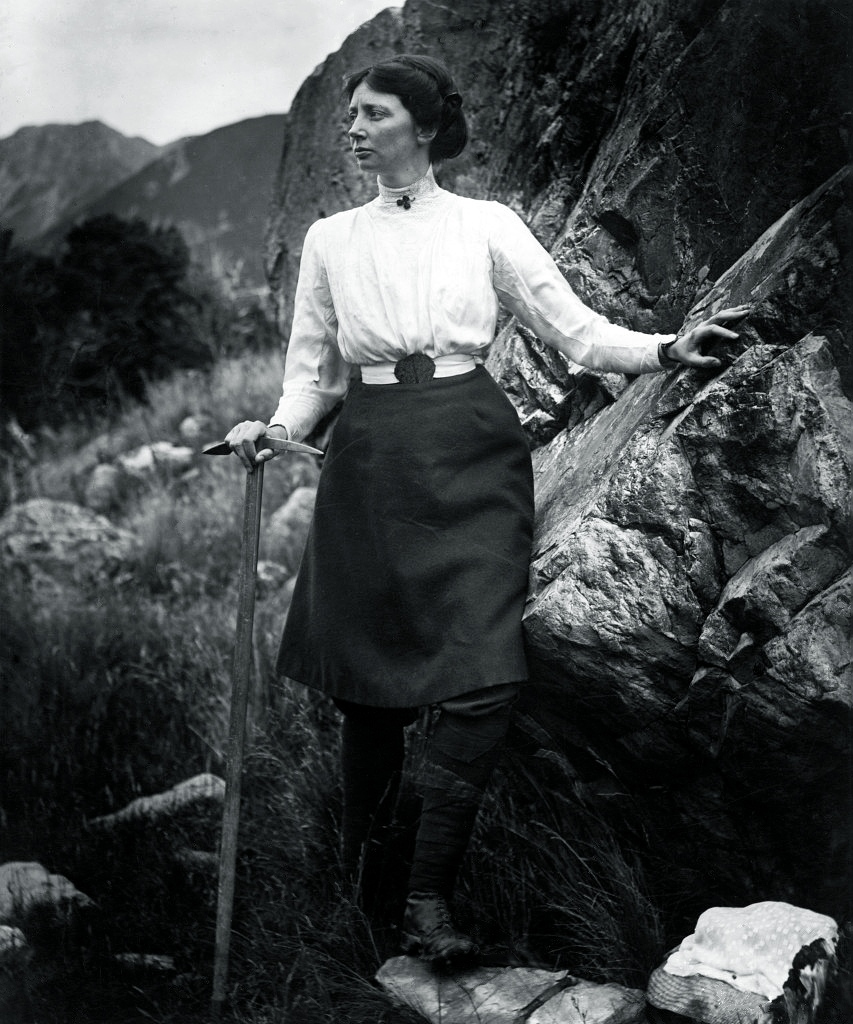
Faur holding an ice axe

The mountain's toponym honours Freda Du Faur (1882–1935), an Australian mountaineer who made the first ascent of this peak on 25 February 1912 with guide Peter Graham. She is best known as the first woman to climb New Zealand's tallest mountain, Aoraki / Mount Cook. She is credited with making numerous first ascents in this area including Mount Sealy, Mount Chudleigh, and Mount Dampier among others. Du Faur was a leading amateur climber of her day and she was the first female high mountaineer known to be active in New Zealand, although she never lived there.

== Climbing ==
Climbing routes with first ascents:

- Standard Route – Freda Du Faur, Peter Graham – (1912)
- West Ridge – Kieran Parsons, Pat Brownlie – (2014)

== Climate ==
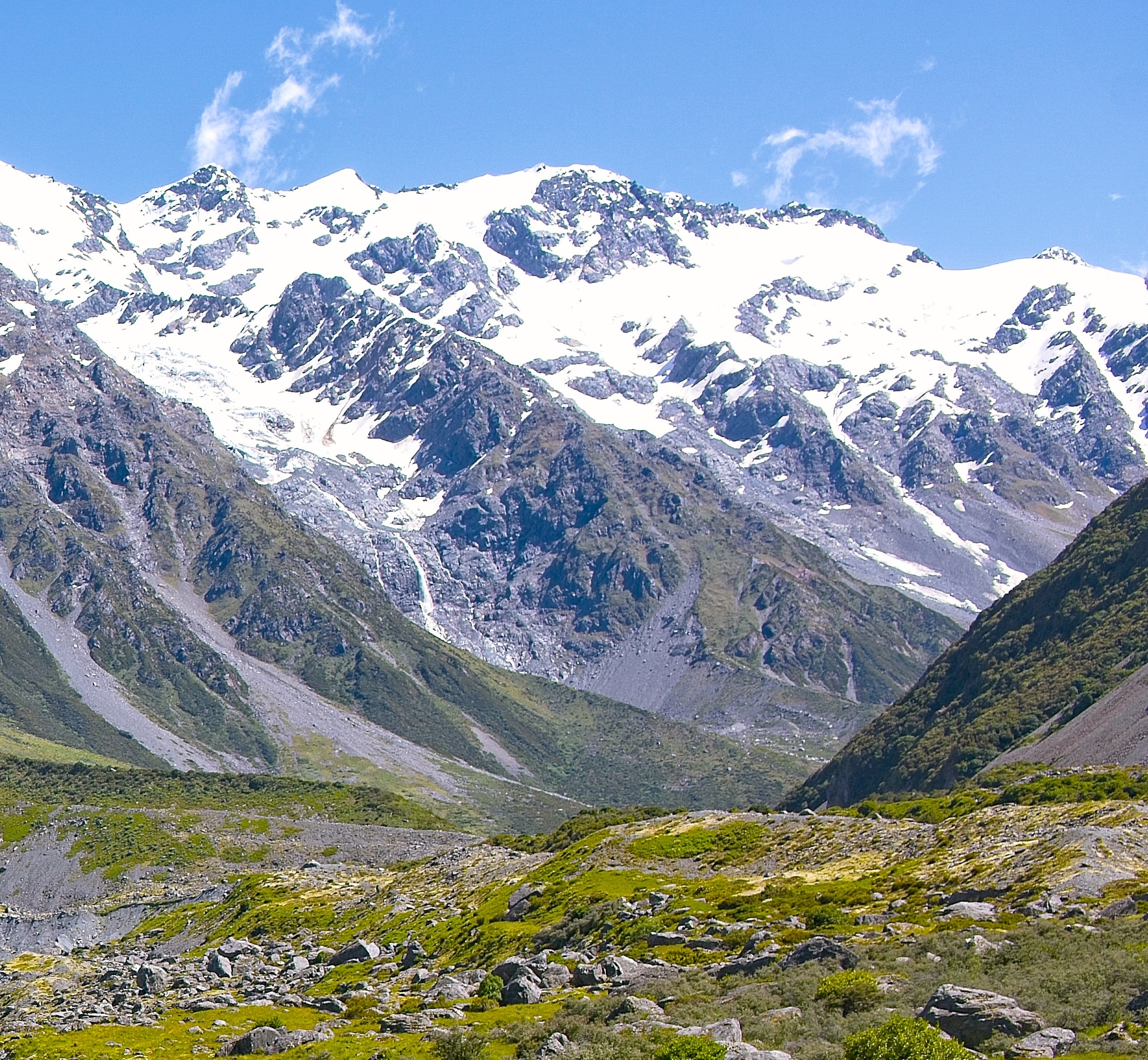
Du Faur Peak in December

Based on the Köppen climate classification, Du Faur Peak is located in a marine west coast (Cfb) climate zone, with a tundra climate at the summit. Prevailing westerly winds blow moist air from the Tasman Sea onto the mountains, where the air is forced upward by the mountains (orographic lift), causing moisture to drop in the form of rain or snow. This climate supports the Stewart Glacier and glacierets on this mountain's slopes. The months of December through February offer the most favourable weather for viewing or climbing this peak.

== See also ==
- List of mountains of New Zealand by height
