= Malte-Brun =

Malte-Brun may refer to:

- Conrad Malte-Brun (1755-1826), Danish-French geographer and journalist
- Victor Adolphe Malte-Brun (1816-1889), French geographer and cartographer and son of Conrad
- Malte Brun (mountain), a New Zealand mountain named after Victor Adolphe Malte-Brun
