= Mount Darwin =

Mount Darwin may refer to:

- Mount Darwin (Antarctica)
- Mount Darwin (Tasmania), Australia
- Mount Darwin (Andes), in the Andes Mountains in Chile
- Mount Darwin (New Zealand)
- Mount Darwin (California), United States
- Mount Darwin, Zimbabwe, a town

== See also ==
- Darwin (disambiguation)
- Darwin Mountains, mountain range in Antarctica
- Volcán Darwin, a volcano on the Galápagos Islands
