= Mount Cook Range =

Mountain range in New Zealand

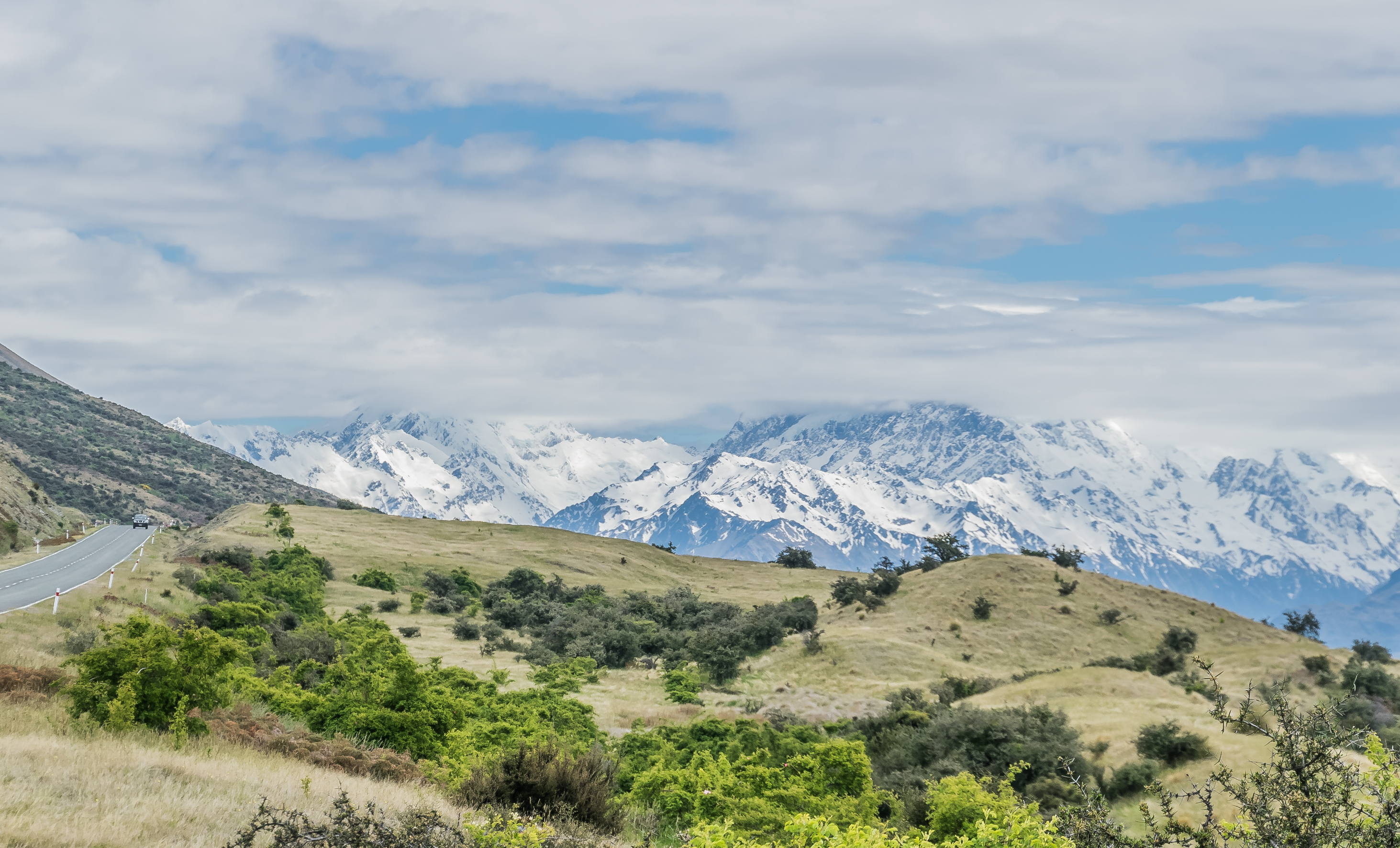
- Mount Cook Range

Highest point
- Peak: Aoraki / Mount Cook
- Elevation: 3,724 m (12,218 ft)
- Coordinates: 43°35′42″S 170°08′31″E

Dimensions
- Length: 16 km (9.9 mi)

Naming
- Etymology: After Kirikirikatata, Aoraki's grandfather according to legend
- Native name: Kirikirikatata (Māori)

Geography
- Location within New Zealand
- Country: New Zealand
- Range coordinates: 43°40′S 170°08′E
- Parent range: Southern Alps

The Mount Cook Range (Māori: Kirikirikatata; officially gazetted as Kirikirikatata / Mount Cook Range) is an offshoot range of the Southern Alps of New Zealand. The range forks from the Southern Alps at the Green Saddle and descends towards Lake Pukaki, encompassing Aoraki / Mount Cook and standing adjacent to the Tasman Glacier.

In 1889, the highest point of the range was 3,763 metres (12,346 feet), but this has since been reduced by avalanches and erosion.

== Naming ==
In 2013, the range was officially renamed Kirikirikatata / Mount Cook Range as part of a number of name changes within the Mount Cook region, following a 2012 proposal. According to Māori creation myths, Kirikirikatata was the grandfather of Aoraki, both of whom turned into mountains; Kirikirikatata into the Mount Cook Range, and Aoraki into Mount Cook.

== See also ==
- Nazomi
- Mount Rosa
