= Mount Darwin (New Zealand) =

Mountain in New Zealand

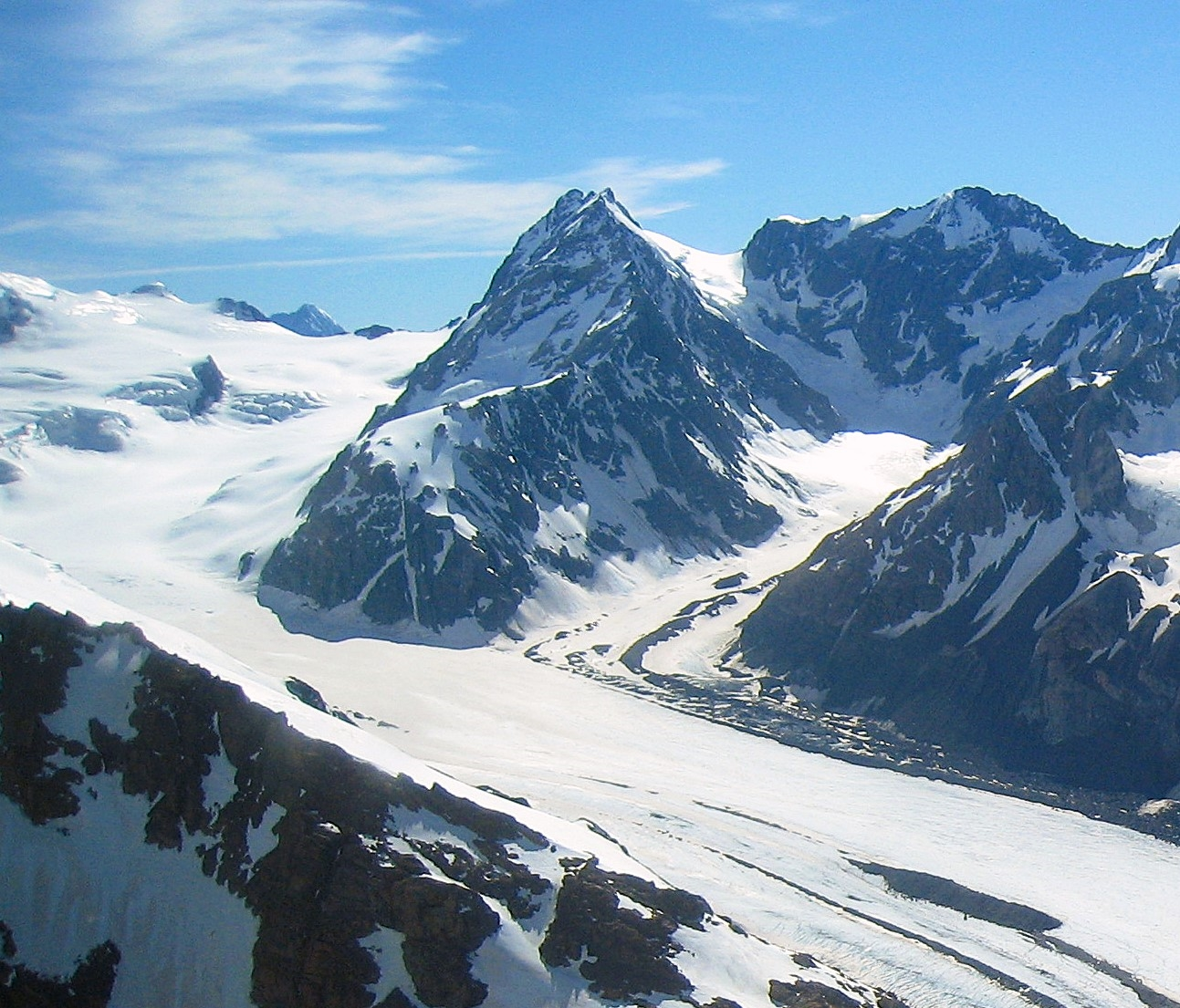
- West aspect, centred (Haeckel Peak to right)

Highest point
- Elevation: 2,952 m (9,685 ft)
- Prominence: 212 m (696 ft)
- Parent peak: Haeckel Peak
- Isolation: 1.51 km (0.94 mi)
- Listing: Mountains of New Zealand
- Coordinates: 43°31′37″S 170°20′23″E

Naming
- Etymology: Charles Darwin

Geography
- Location within New Zealand
- Interactive map of Mount Darwin
- Location: South Island
- Country: New Zealand
- Region: Canterbury
- Protected area: Aoraki / Mount Cook National Park
- Parent range: Southern Alps; Malte Brun Range
- Topo map: NZMS260 I36

Climbing
- First ascent: 1894

Mount Darwin is a 2,952-metre-elevation (9,685-foot) mountain in the Canterbury Region of New Zealand.

== Description ==
Mount Darwin is set in the Malte Brun Range of the Southern Alps and is situated in the Canterbury Region of South Island. This remote peak is located 17 kilometres (11 mi) northeast of Aoraki / Mount Cook in Aoraki / Mount Cook National Park. Topographic relief is significant as the summit rises 850 metres (2,789 feet) above the Darwin Glacier in one kilometre, and over 750 metres (2,461 feet) above the Tasman Glacier in 0.7 kilometre. Precipitation runoff from the mountain drains to the Tasman River. The nearest higher peak is Haeckel Peak, 1.53 kilometres to the south-southeast. The first ascent of the summit was made in March 1894 by Jack Clarke, Tom Fyfe, and Franz Von Kronecker. The mountain's toponym was applied by Julius von Haast to honour Charles Darwin (1809–1882), the famous British naturalist who visited New Zealand in 1835.

== Climbing ==
Climbing routes on Mount Darwin:

- West Ridge – Jack Clarke, Tom Fyfe, Franz Von Kronecker – (1894)
- North West Arête – Sydney King, Darby Thomson – (1914)
- Darwin Route – B. Carter, J. Cruse, R.H. Peate, J.M. Rowe – (1955)
- Annan-Darwin Ridge – D. Smyth, J.B. Waterhouse – (1966)
- Darwin Buttress – Geoff Wayatt, A. Cross, M. Douglas, T. Terry, R. Smith – (1967)
- Horn/McLean Rib – R. Horn, D. McLean – (1969)
- Lost Bolt Buttress – R. Aitken, S. Firth – (1973)
- South Face – R. Arbon, J.B. Waterhouse – (1979)
- Couloir Route – Andrew Lock, Luke Trehey – (1990)
- Natural Selection – Lee Mackintosh, Chris Elliott – (2014)

== Climate ==
Based on the Köppen climate classification, Mount Darwin is located in a marine west coast (Cfb) climate zone, with a subpolar oceanic climate (Cfc) at the summit. Prevailing westerly winds blow moist air from the Tasman Sea onto the mountains, where the air is forced upward by the mountains (orographic lift), causing moisture to drop in the form of rain or snow. This climate supports the Darwin and Tasman glaciers surrounding the peak. The months of December through February offer the most favourable weather for viewing or climbing this peak.

== Gallery ==
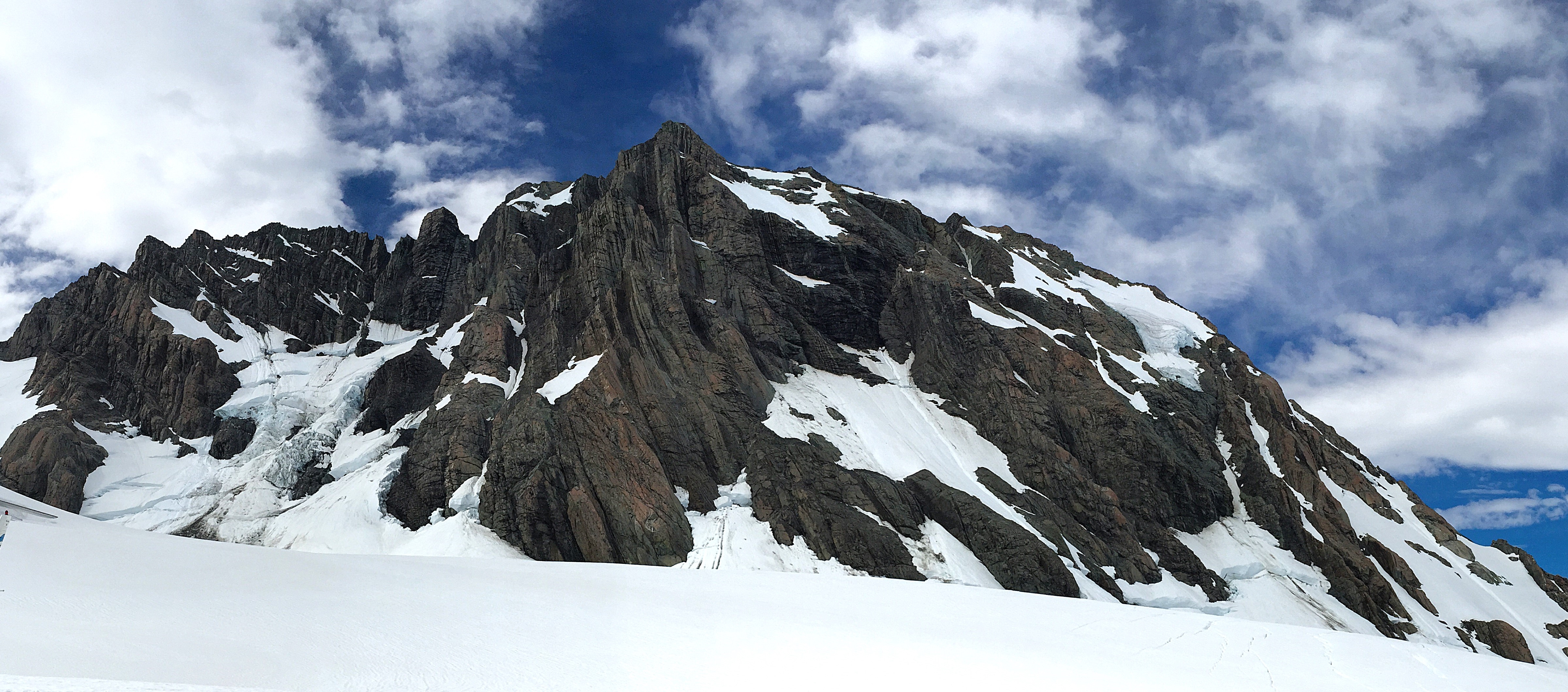
North aspect

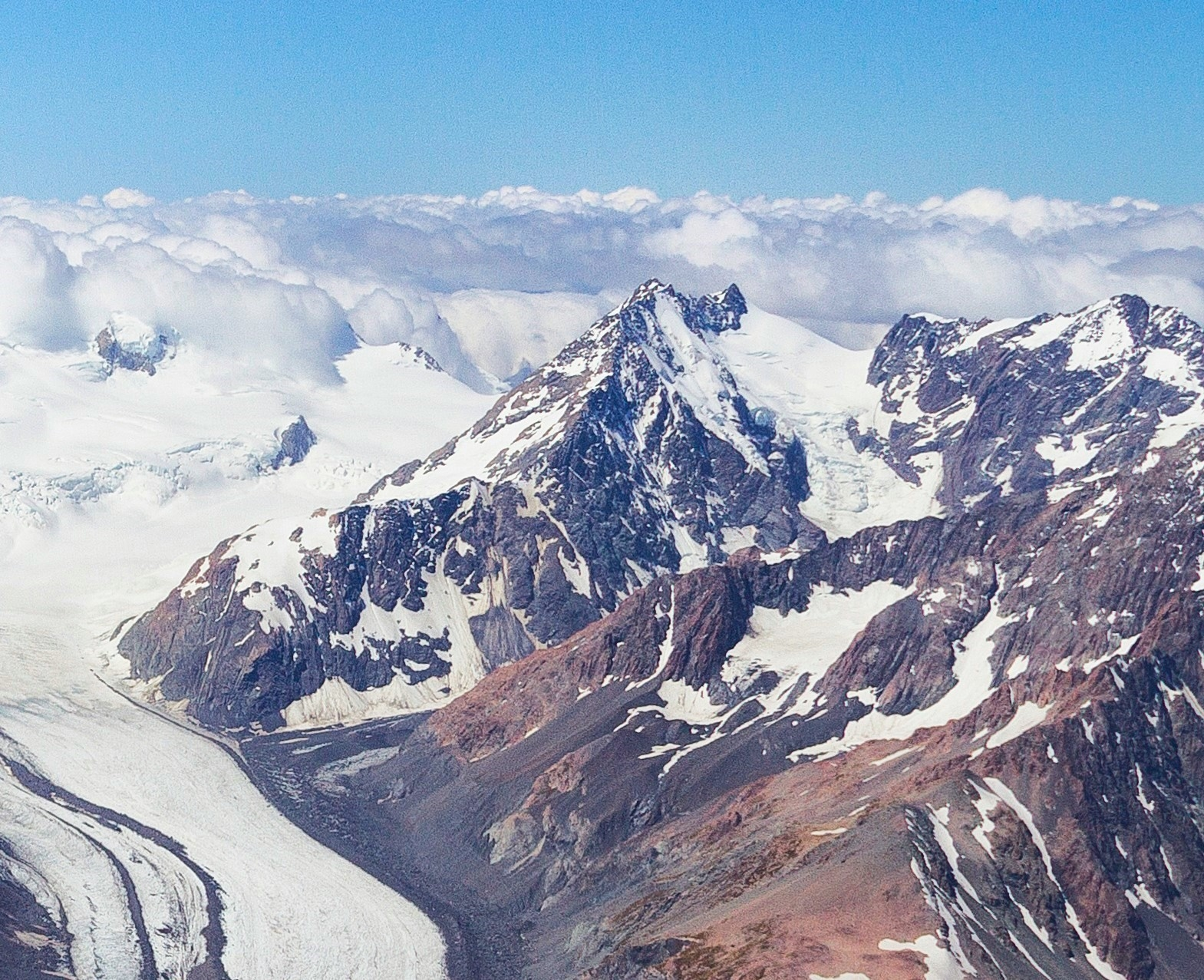
Aerial view from southwest

== See also ==
- List of mountains of New Zealand by height
