= Mount Rosa (New Zealand) =

Mountain in Canterbury, New Zealand

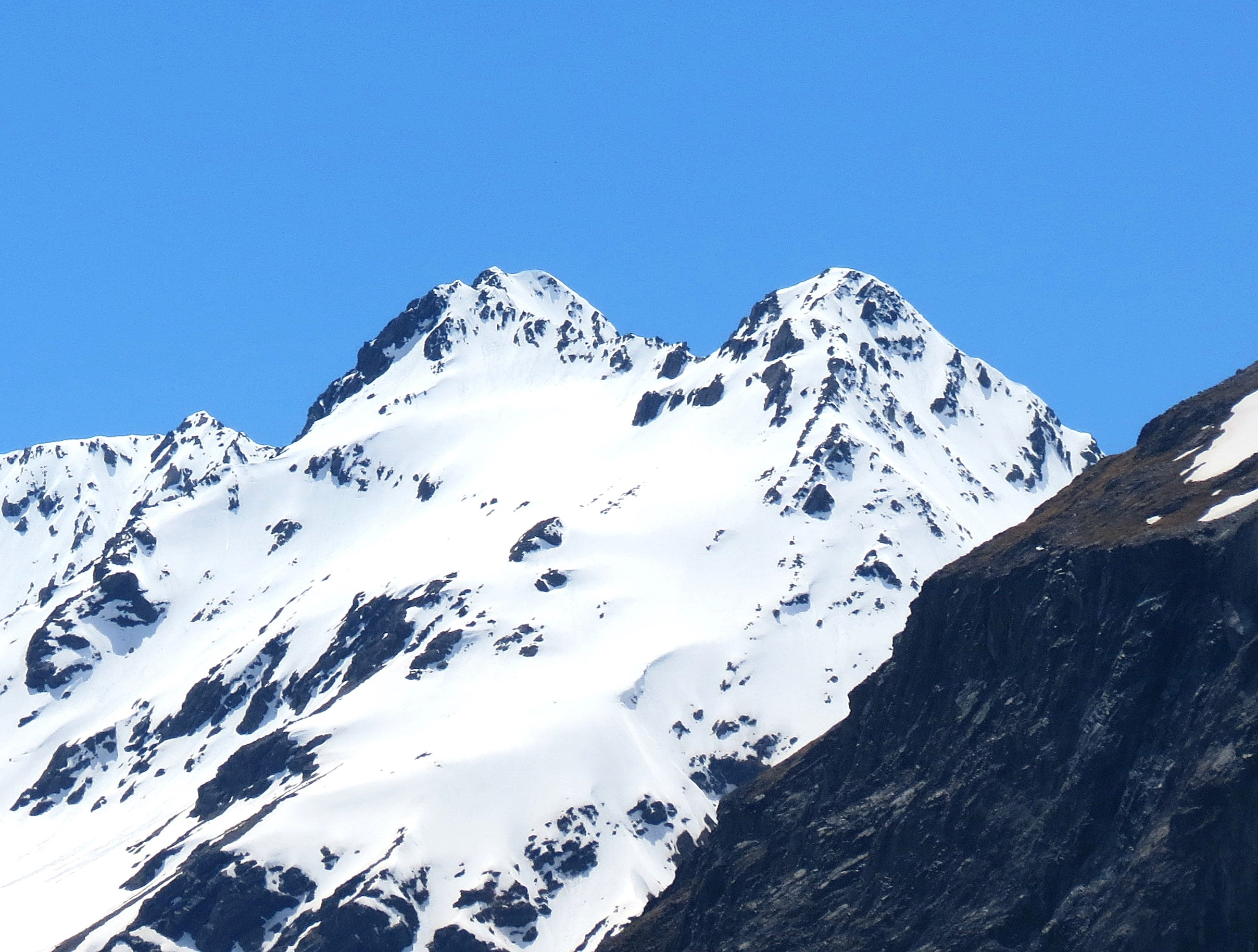
- Mts. Rosa (left), Mabel (right)

Highest point
- Elevation: 2,161 m (7,090 ft)
- Coordinates: 43.65361°S 170.14824°E

Naming
- Etymology: Rosetta (Rosa) Moorhouse

Geography
- Location within New Zealand
- Interactive map of Mount Rosa
- Location: South Island
- Country: New Zealand
- Region: Canterbury
- Protected area: Aoraki / Mount Cook National Park
- Parent range: Southern Alps; Mount Cook Range
- Topo map: NZMS260 H36

Climbing
- First ascent: 1890

Mount Rosa is a 2,161-metre-elevation (7,090-foot) mountain in Canterbury, New Zealand.

== Description ==
Mount Rosa is set in the Mount Cook Range of the Southern Alps of the South Island. This peak is located nine kilometres (5.6 mi) north of Mount Cook Village and set in Aoraki / Mount Cook National Park. Precipitation runoff from the mountain's west slope drains into the Hooker River, whereas the east slope drains to the Tasman River. Topographic relief is significant as the summit rises 1,160 metres (3,806 feet) above the Hooker Glacier in two kilometres, and 1,445 metres (4,741 feet) above Tasman Lake in 2.5 kilometres. The first ascent of the summit was made in 1890 by Rosa Moorhouse and Mabel Studholme.

== Etymology ==
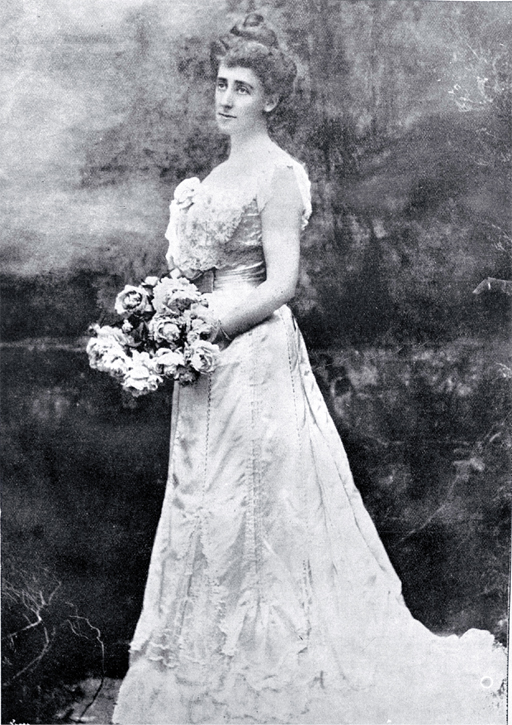
Rosa

The mountain's toponym honours mountaineer Rose (Rosa) Moorhouse (1866–1932). The peak was named by Rosa Moorhouse and her cousin Mabel Studholme following their ascent of the peak in 1890. From the summit they also named nearby Mount Mabel (2,091m). Rose Moorhouse was from a well-connected family and was also the niece of William Sefton Moorhouse, after whom nearby Mount Sefton is named. In 1892, Rose married Arthur Rhodes, New Zealand member of parliament and mayor of Christchurch. Rosa's charm and style cemented their place in Christchurch social circles and considerably assisted Arthur's political career. After Arthur's death, she lived with her son in London and died by falling 18 metres from the window of her son's flat.

== Climate ==
Based on the Köppen climate classification, Mount Rosa is located in a marine west coast (Cfb) climate zone, with a subpolar oceanic climate (Cfc) at the summit. Prevailing westerly winds blow moist air from the Tasman Sea onto the mountains, where the air is forced upward by the mountains (orographic lift), causing moisture to drop in the form of rain or snow. This climate supports an unnamed glacieret on the northeast slope of the peak. The months of December through February offer the most favourable weather for viewing or climbing this peak.

== See also ==
- List of mountains of New Zealand by height
