= Nazomi =

Mountain in Canterbury, New Zealand

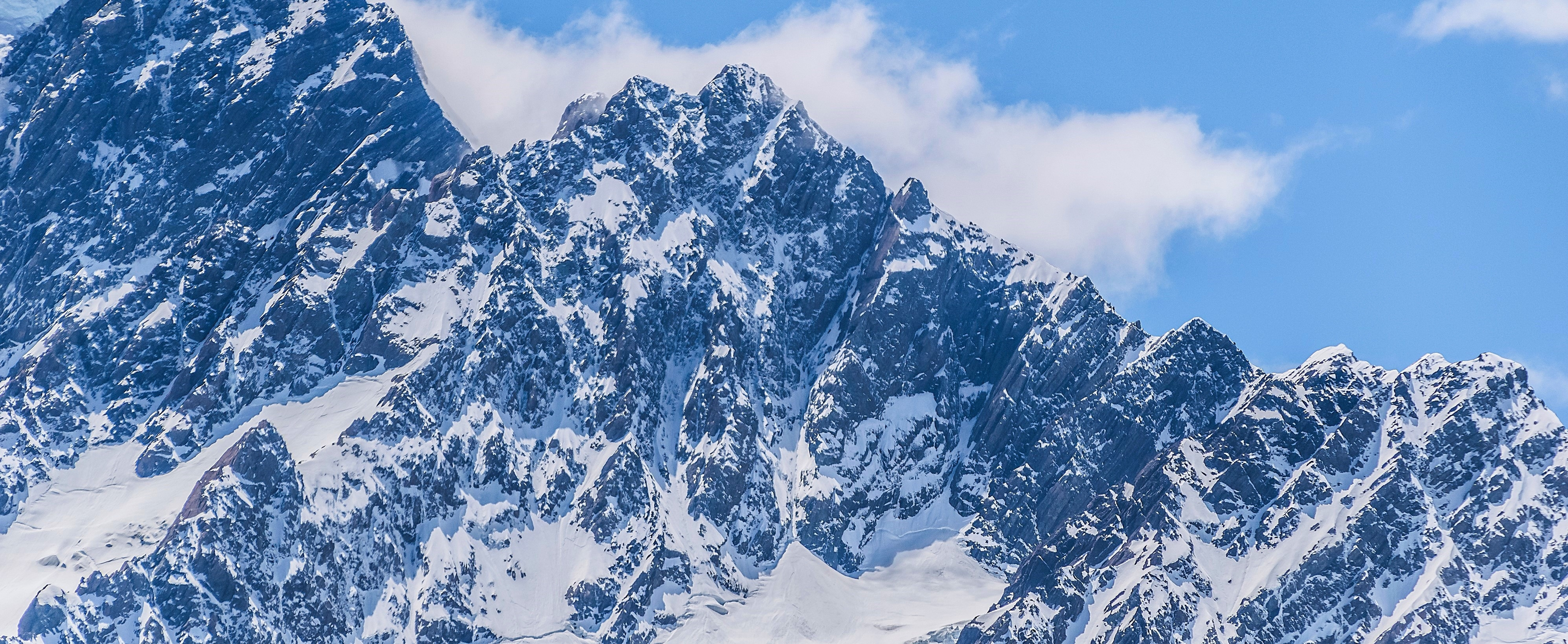
- South Face

Highest point
- Elevation: 2,925 m (9,596 ft)
- Prominence: 106 m (348 ft)
- Isolation: 1.49 km (0.93 mi)
- Listing: Mountains of New Zealand
- Coordinates: 43.62195°S 170.14327°E

Geography
- Location within New Zealand
- Interactive map of Nazomi
- Location: South Island
- Country: New Zealand
- Region: Canterbury
- Protected area: Aoraki / Mount Cook National Park
- Parent range: Southern Alps; Mount Cook Range
- Topo map(s): NZMS260 H36; Topo50 BX15

Geology
- Rock age: Triassic
- Rock type: Semischist of Rakaia Terrane

Climbing
- First ascent: 1912

Nazomi is a 2,925-metre-elevation (9,596-foot) mountain in Canterbury, New Zealand.

== Description ==
Nazomi is set in the Mount Cook Range of the Southern Alps of the South Island. This peak is located 12 kilometres (7.5 mi) north of Mount Cook Village and set in Aoraki / Mount Cook National Park. Precipitation runoff from the mountain's west slope drains to the Hooker River, whereas the east slope drains to the Tasman River. Topographic relief is significant as the summit rises 1,625 metres (5,331 feet) above the Hooker Glacier in two kilometres, and 2,025 metres (6,644 feet) above the Tasman Glacier in four kilometres. The nearest higher neighbour is the Low Peak of Aoraki / Mount Cook, 1.5 kilometres to the north.

== Etymology ==
The mountain's toponym was applied by Freda Du Faur when she climbed this peak on 12 March 1912. Nazomi is a Japanese word she thought meant "heart's desire", but which may better be translated as "wish, desire, or hope."

== Climbing ==
Climbing routes with the first ascents:

- Original Route – Freda Du Faur, Alec and Peter Graham – (1912)
- South Face (Cormack-Wilson Rib) – H.W. Cormack, L.W. Wilson – (1936)
- East Face – Bruce Gillies, Roland Rodda – (1942)
- MacInnes Ridge – Hamish MacInnes, Peter Robinson – (1955)
- South Ridge – C.J. Burrows, W.A. Croll – (1955)
- Gledhill Buttress – Alan and Geoff Gledhill – (1973)

== Climate ==
Based on the Köppen climate classification, Nazomi is located in a marine west coast (Cfb) climate zone, with a subpolar oceanic climate (Cfc) at the summit. Prevailing westerly winds blow moist air from the Tasman Sea onto the mountains, where the air is forced upwards by the mountains (orographic lift), causing moisture to drop in the form of rain or snow. This climate supports the Noeline, Caroline, Ball, and Mona glaciers on the slopes of the peak. The months of December through February offer the most favourable weather for viewing or climbing this peak.

== Gallery ==
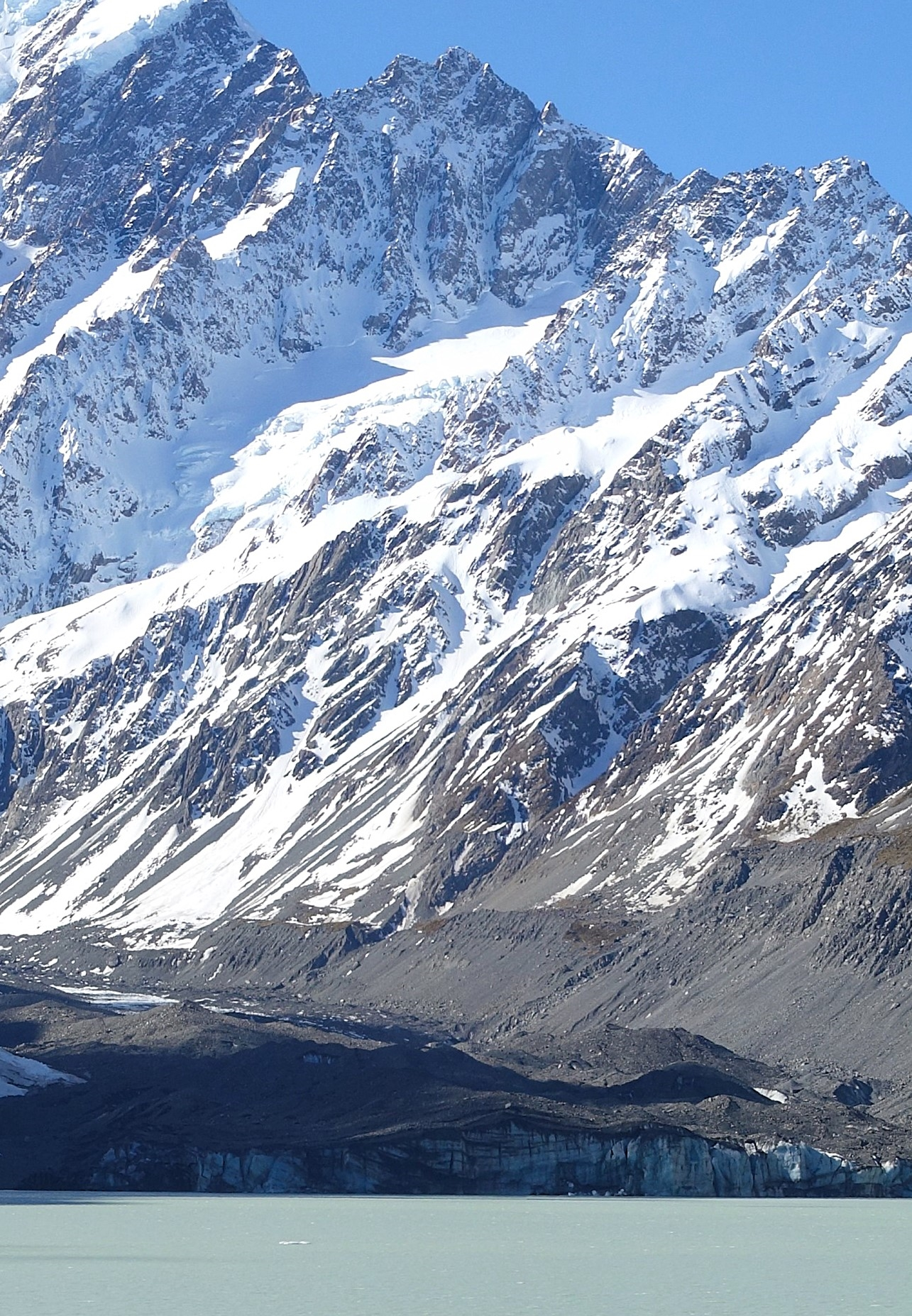
South aspect of Nazomi

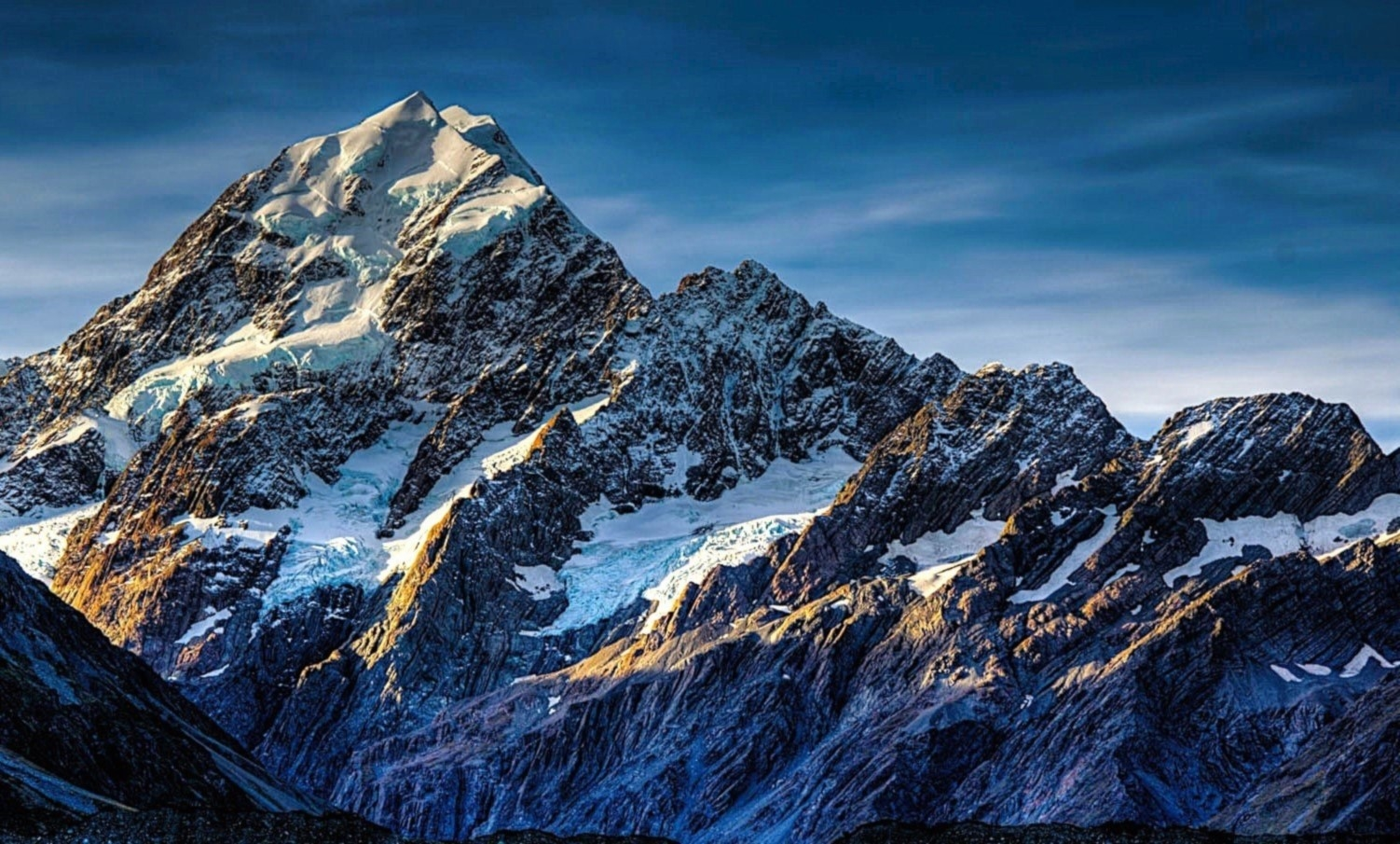
Low Peak of Mount Cook (left) and Nazomi (centred)

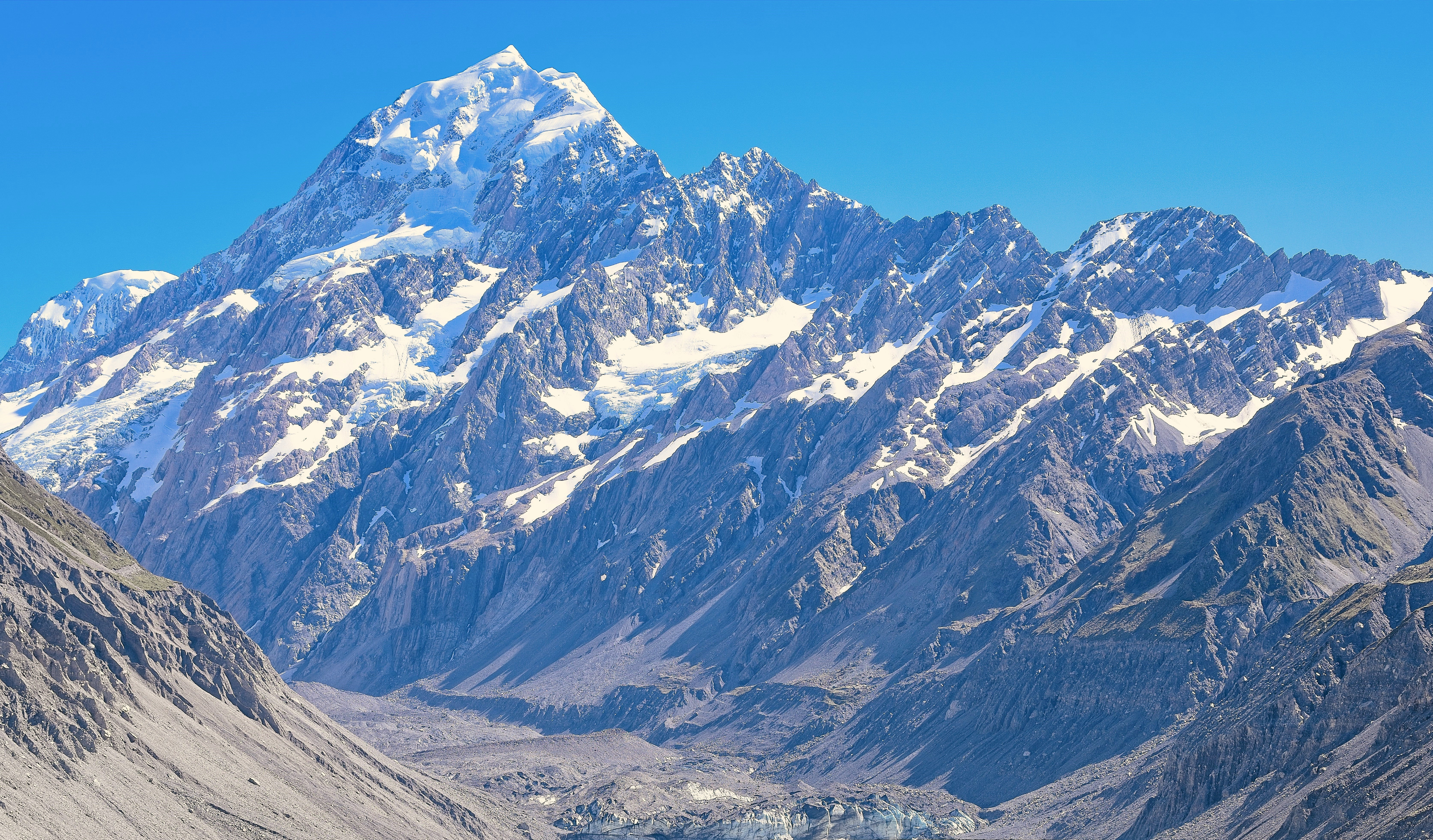
Mount Cook (left), Nazomi (centred), Turner Peak (right)

== See also ==
- List of mountains of New Zealand by height
