= Freda Du Faur =

Australian mountaineer (1882–1935)

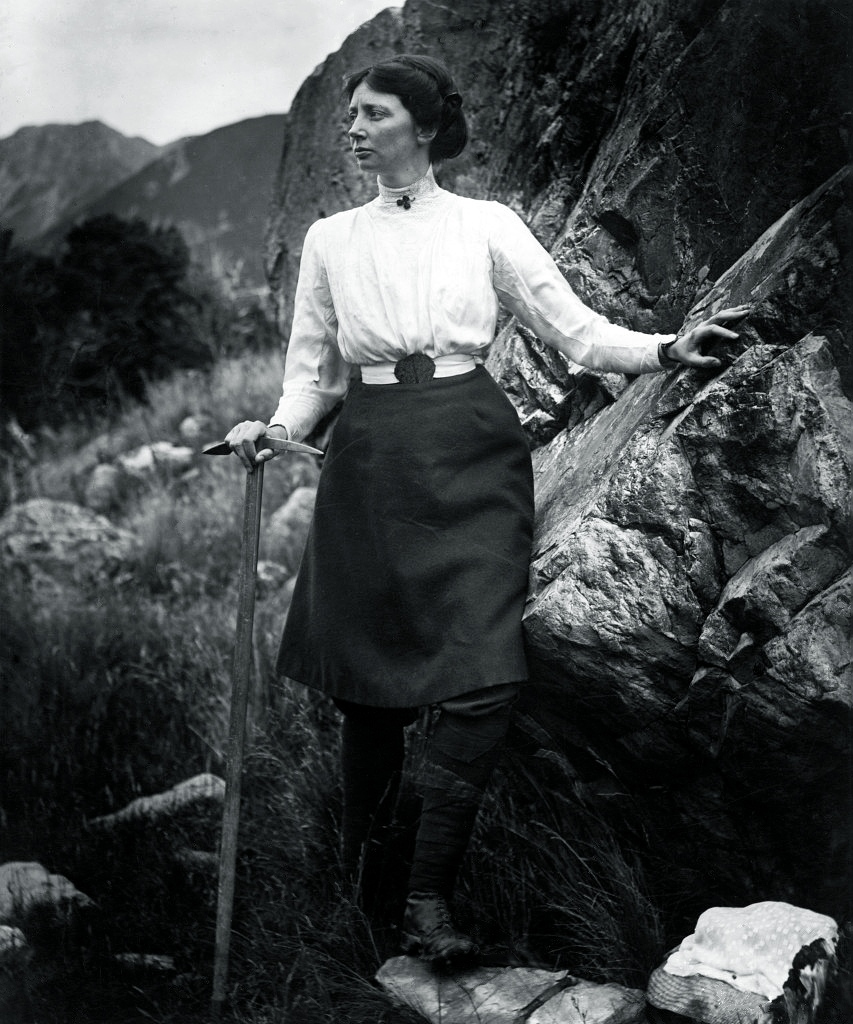
- Du Faur c. 1906–1913
- Born: 16 September 1882; Croydon, Colony of New South Wales
- Died: 13 September 1935 (aged 52); Dee Why, Sydney, Australia
- Known for: Mountaineering pioneer

Emmeline Freda Du Faur (16 September 1882 – 13 September 1935) was an Australian mountaineer, credited as the first woman to climb New Zealand's tallest mountain, Aoraki / Mount Cook. Du Faur was a leading amateur climber of her day. She was the first female high mountaineer known to be active in New Zealand, although she never lived there.

== Early life ==
Du Faur was born in Croydon, Sydney, on 16 September 1882. She was the daughter of Frederick Eccleston Du Faur (1832–1915), a public servant who, after retirement, became a stock, station, and land agent, and patron of the arts, and his second wife, Blanche Mary Elizabeth Woolley (1845–1906), daughter of Professor John Woolley and sister of Emmeline M. D. Woolley.

Du Faur was educated at Sydney Church of England Girls Grammar School. She probably developed her passion for mountaineering when she lived with her family near the Ku-ring-gai Chase National Park. As a young woman, she explored the area and taught herself to rock climb. She did not finish nursing training due to her "sensitive and highly-strung nature". Thanks to an inheritance from her aunt Emmeline, she had an independent income that enabled her to travel and climb.

== Encountering Mount Cook (1906) ==
Du Faur summered in New Zealand. In late 1906, she saw photographs of Mount Cook at the New Zealand International Exhibition in Christchurch. This prompted her to travel to the Hermitage hotel at Mount Cook Village, where she became determined to climb to the snow-capped summit, managing to do so four years later.

== Mountaineering experiences (1906–1910) ==
In 1908, a second trip to Mount Cook led to Du Faur's introduction to a New Zealand guide, Peter Graham. Graham agreed to teach Du Faur ropework and add snow and ice climbing to her skill on rocks. Du Faur found this freedom an enjoyable escape from the constraints and frustrations of family and society.

In 1909, Du Faur returned to undertake several climbs of increasing difficulty, the first of which was a significant ascent of Mount Sealy on 19 December 1909. Though these climbs were intended to be just Graham and Du Faur, social norms of propriety at the time did not look kindly on an overnight climbing expedition composed solely of an unmarried woman and a male guide. Thus, a chaperone was enlisted, and Du Faur committed to wearing a skirt to just below the knee over knickerbockers and long puttees while she climbed. Still, she received criticism from both men and women for her choices in athleticism and dress. After her climb to the summit of Mount Cook in 1910, she is quoted as stating: "I was the first unmarried woman to climb in New Zealand, and in consequence, I received all the hard knocks until one day when I awoke more or less famous in the mountaineering world, after which I could and did do exactly as seemed to me best." Following her notoriety, she would dispense with a chaperone but retain her customary climbing attire. It pleased her that her attire afforded an element of femininity to upset critics and challenge existing stereotypes of physically active women.

In 1910, Du Faur spent three months at the Dupain Institute of Physical Education in Sydney training with Muriel "Minnie" Cadogan (1885–1929), who became her life partner. After the training, Du Faur returned to Mount Cook in November 1910.

== Summiting Mount Cook (December 1910) ==
On 3 December 1910, Du Faur became the first woman to climb to the summit of Mount Cook, New Zealand's highest peak at 3,760 metres (12,340 ft). Her guides included Peter and Alex (Alec) Graham, and together they ascended in a record six hours.

Du Faur said about her ascent to the summit: 'I gained the summit ... feeling very little, very lonely and much inclined to cry'.

On the return trip from the summit, Du Faur was photographed in front of a boulder to commemorate the historic climb. The boulder, now called "Freda's Rock" is located approximately 200 metres into the Hooker Valley Track at Mount Cook National Park.

== Subsequent climbing seasons ==
Du Faur made many other noteworthy climbs. In the same season as her Mount Cook ascent in 1910, she climbed Mounts De la Beche (2,979 metres (9,774 ft)) and Green (2,828 metres (9,278 ft)), and was the first person to climb Chudleigh (2,944 metres (9,659 ft)).

In the next climbing season, she scaled a virgin peak now named Du Faur Peak (2,330 metres (7,644 ft)) after her. She also made the first ascents of Nazomi (2,925 metres (9,596 ft)) and Mount Dampier (3,420 metres (11,220 ft)), and the second ascents of Mount Tasman (3,497 metres (11,473 ft)) and Mount Lendenfeld (3,192 metres (10,472 ft)).

In her final season, she made the first ascents of Mount Pibrac (2,567 metres (8,422 ft)) and Mount Cadogan (2,398 metres (7,867 ft)), both of which she named. Perhaps her most notable climb was in January 1913 with Peter Graham and David (Darby) Thomson, when they made the first grand traverse of all three peaks of Mount Cook. This 'grand traverse' is now regarded as a classic climb of New Zealand's Southern Alps and continues to be associated with Du Faur's name.

On 10 February 1913, the same climbing party made the first traverse of Mount Sefton (3,149 metres (10,331 ft)). Du Faur stopped climbing the next month.

== Life after mountaineering (1914–1935) ==
Du Faur and her partner, Muriel Cadogan, moved to England in 1914, spending time in Bournemouth. Though they had intended to climb the European Alps, Canada, and the Himalayas, World War I put an end to their plans. The following year, Du Faur published her book The Conquest of Mount Cook in London. It proved important for its record of her mountaineering feats and her approach to climbing.

In June 1929, Cadogan died. Du Faur returned to Australia, where she lived in Dee Why, Sydney. At first, she lived with her brother's family and later in her own cottage. Her main interest was bushwalking in Dee Why and Collaroy. She suffered from depression at the loss of Cadogan, and on 13 September 1935, she fatally poisoned herself by inhaling a quantity of coal gas.

She had been, in 1908, the principal beneficiary of her aunt Emmeline's will and her own will, benefiting Jean Lord, was contested by relatives who disputed her sanity. The Coroner, after examining Du Faur's notebook and several letters, denied the claim, finding her "the opposite of insane".

Du Faur was privately interred in the Church of England cemetery at Manly, Sydney.

== Acknowledgements ==
At a ceremony on 3 December 2006, Du Faur's previously unmarked grave was marked by a group of New Zealanders. A memorial stone made of New Zealand greywacke and a plaque commemorating her alpine achievements were placed at the gravesite.

In 2017 there was a theatre play about Du Faur written by Jan Bolwell and premiered at BATS Theatre in New Zealand. The play is called Taking the High Ground, and also features New Zealand climber Lydia Bradey.

== Bibliography ==
- Freda Du Faur: The Conquest of Mount Cook and Other Climbs: An Account of Four Seasons Mountaineering on the Southern Alps of New Zealand. London: Allen and Unwin (1915), republ. New Zealand: Capper Press (1977) at New Zealand Electronic Text Collection
- Freda Du Faur: The Conquest of Mount Cook and Other Climbs at Internet Archive
- Sally Irwin: Between Heaven and Earth: The Life of Mountaineer Freda du Faur: 1882–1935. Hawthorn, Victoria: White Crane Press: 2000: ISBN 0-9578183-0-0
- E. J. O'Donnell: Du Faur, Emmeline Freda (1882–1935), Australian Dictionary of Biography, Volume 8 (1981). Melbourne University Press pp 349–350.
- Bee Dawson: Lady Travellers: Tourists of Early New Zealand (2001). Auckland: Penguin ISBN 0-14-100415-0
- Jim Wilson: Aōrangi: The Story of Mount Cook (1968). Christchurch: Whitcombe and Tombes
