= Mount Chudleigh =

Mountain in New Zealand

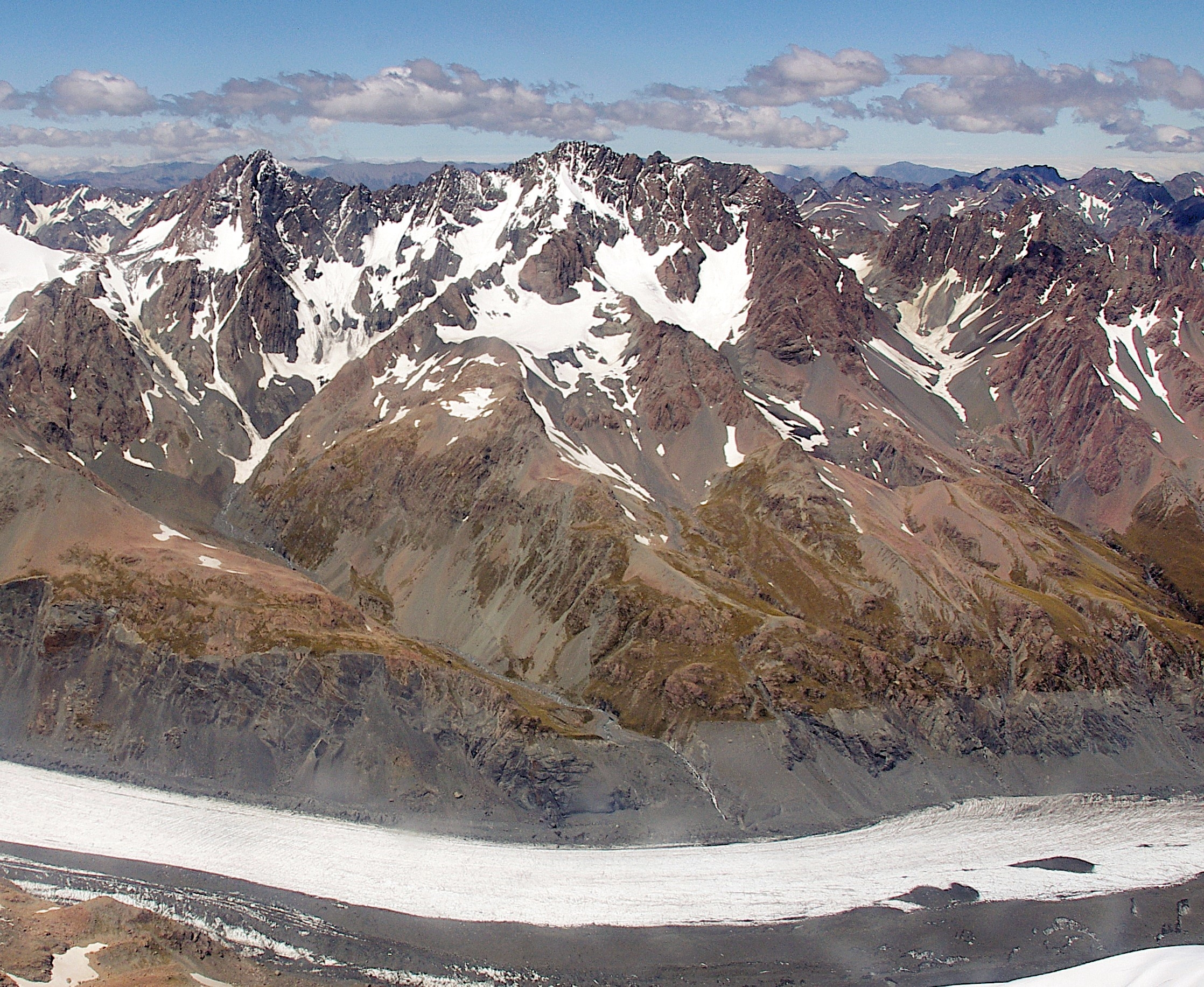
- Northwest aspect, centred

Highest point
- Elevation: 2,966 m (9,731 ft)
- Prominence: 483 m (1,585 ft)
- Parent peak: Malte Brun
- Isolation: 3.19 km (1.98 mi)
- Listing: New Zealand #11
- Coordinates: 43°35′15″S 170°16′42″E

Naming
- Etymology: Edward R. Chudleigh

Geography
- Location within New Zealand
- Interactive map of Mount Chudleigh
- Location: South Island
- Country: New Zealand
- Region: Canterbury
- Protected area: Aoraki / Mount Cook National Park
- Parent range: Southern Alps; Malte Brun Range
- Topo map(s): NZMS260 I36; Topo50 BX16

Climbing
- First ascent: January 1911
- Easiest route: Northwest Ridge

Mount Chudleigh is a 2,966-metre-elevation (9,731-foot) mountain in New Zealand.

== Description ==
Mount Chudleigh is set in the Malte Brun Range of the Southern Alps and is situated in the Canterbury Region of South Island. This remote peak is located 11 kilometres (6.8 mi) east of Aoraki / Mount Cook in Aoraki / Mount Cook National Park. Precipitation runoff from the mountain drains into tributaries of the Tasman River. Topographic relief is significant as the summit rises 1,966 metres (6,450 feet) above the Murchison River in 3.4 kilometres and over 1,866 metres (6,122 feet) above the Tasman Glacier in 3.7 kilometres. The nearest higher peak is Malte Brun, three kilometres to the northeast. The first ascent of Chudleigh was made in 1911 by Hugh Chambers, Freda Du Faur, and Jim Murphy. The mountain's toponym was applied by mountaineers Arthur Paul Harper and Guy Mannering after Edward Chudleigh (1841–1920), a sheep farmer in the Rangitata District.

== Climbing ==
Climbing routes on Mount Chudleigh:

- North West Ridge – Hugh Chambers, Freda Du Faur, Jim Murphy – (1911)
- North Face (descent) – Mike Andrews, Donald Cargo – (1973)
- North Face – S. Hancock, T. Murray – (1988)

== Climate ==
Based on the Köppen climate classification, Mount Chudleigh is located in a marine west coast (Cfb) climate zone, with a subpolar oceanic climate (Cfc) at the summit. Prevailing westerly winds blow moist air from the Tasman Sea onto the mountains, where the air is forced upward by the mountains (orographic lift), causing moisture to drop in the form of rain or snow. This climate supports the Barkley, Onslow, Lecky, Reay, Walpole, and Langdale glaciers on the peak's slopes. The months of December through February offer the most favourable weather for viewing or climbing this peak.

== Gallery ==
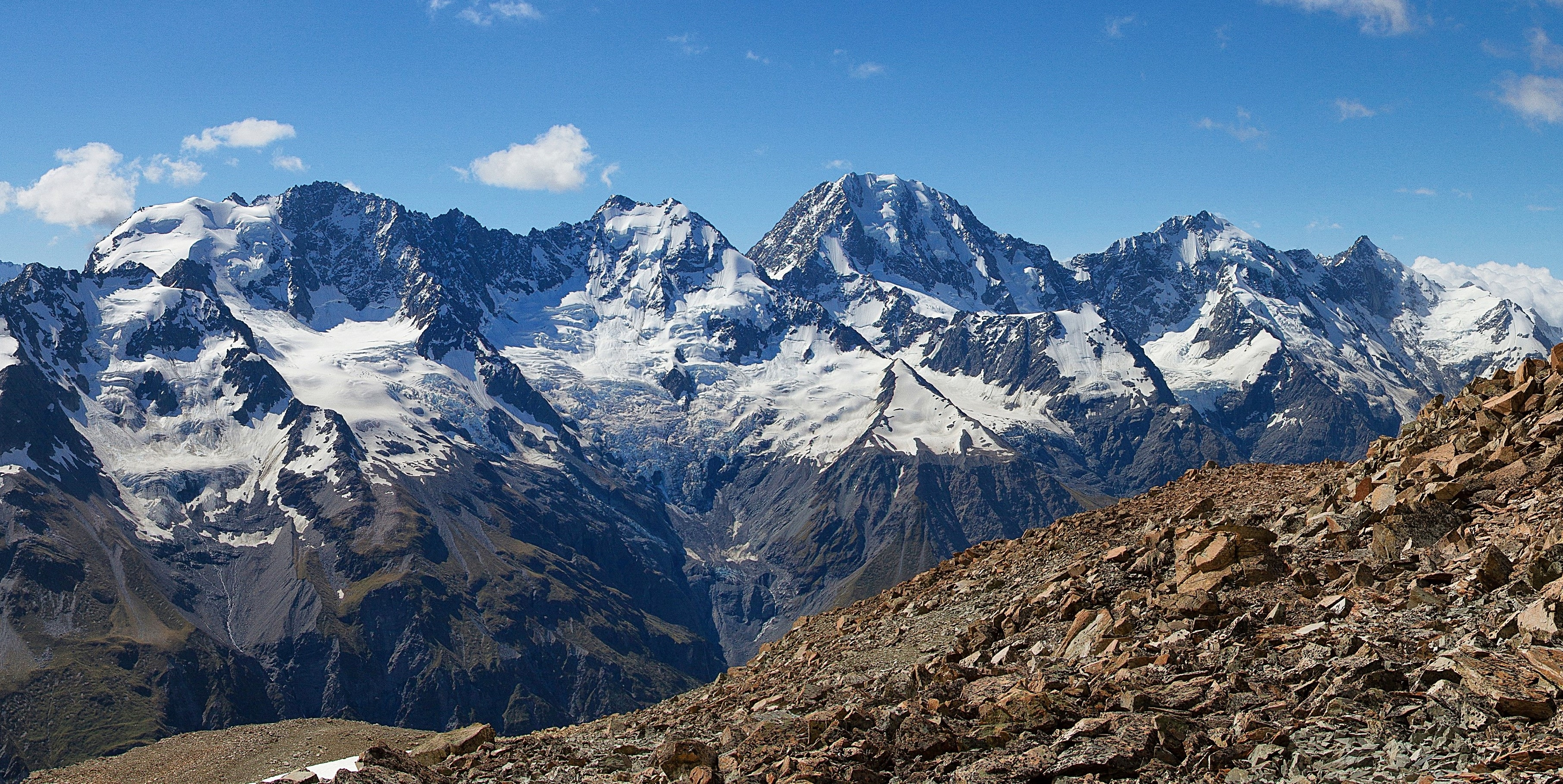
South aspect of Malte Brun Range. L→Rː Chudleigh, Aiguilles Rouges, Malte Brun, Hamilton, Haeckel Peak.

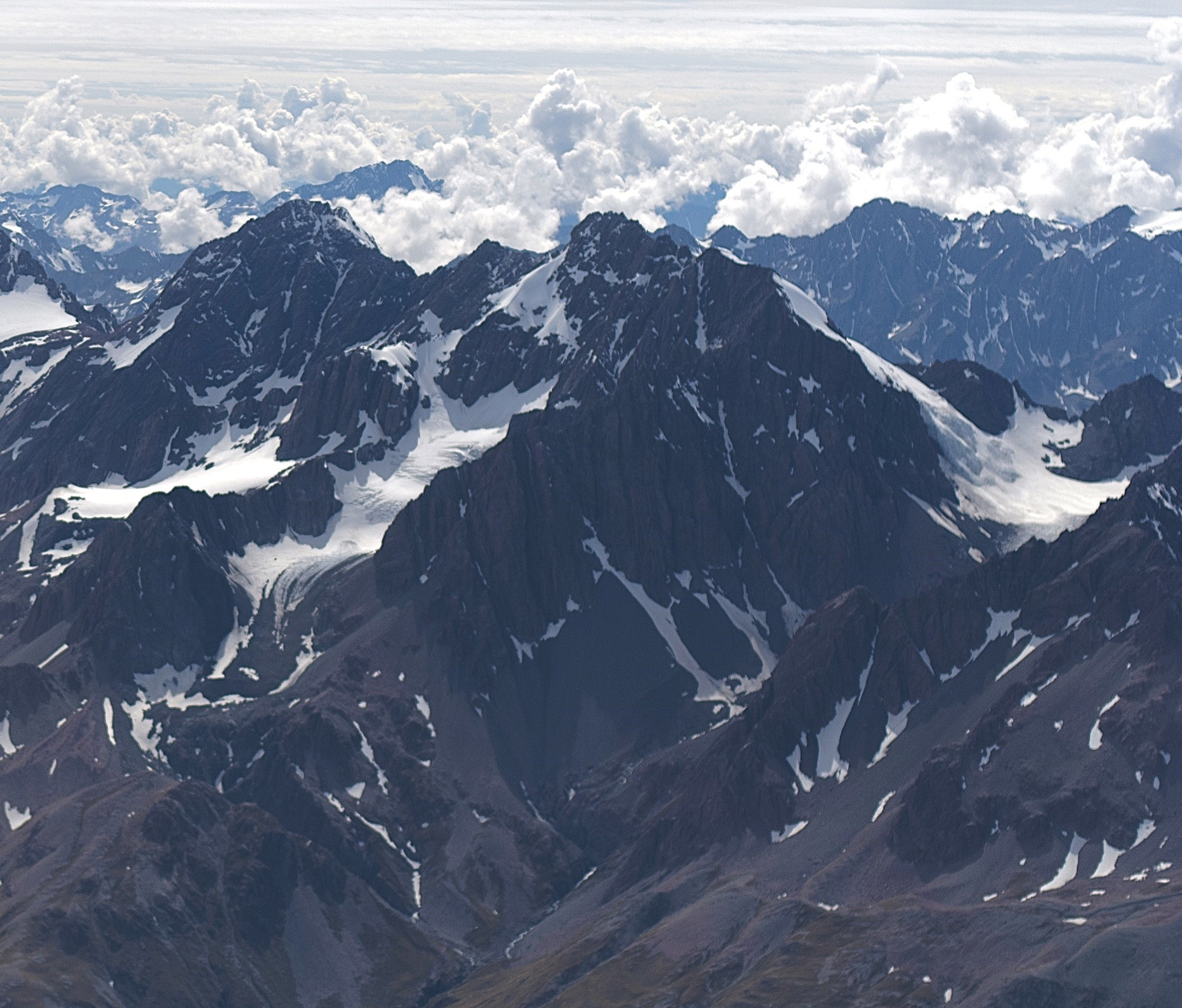
West aspect of Mount Chudleigh centred

== See also ==
- List of mountains of New Zealand by height
