= Louis-François Faur =

Louis-François Faur (24 August 1746 – 1829) was a French librettist, playwright and man of letters.

Faur was a secretary of the Duke of Fronsac and, although he left many productions, he ended his days in poverty and oblivion.

== Works ==
=== Comedies ===
- 1780: le Déguisement forcé, two-act comedy
- 1784: Isabelle et Fernand ou l’Alcade de Zolaitrée, three-act comedy
- 1784: l’Amour à l’épreuve
- 1786: la Veuve anglaise
- 1801: le Confident par hasard, comedy in 4 acts and in verse
- 1805: Rien pour lui, three-act comedy, etc.

=== Dramas ===
- 1783: Montrose et Amélie, qui eut un grand succès
- 1786: la Prévention vaincue
- 1795: Alphonsine et Séraphine
- 1805: le Sabot fidèle

=== Librettos for opéras comiques ===
- 1786: Colombine et Cassandre le pleureur
- 1794: l’Intrigant sans le vouloir
- 1796: la Fête de la cinquantaine, in-8°, etc.

The one work of Faur's production which was the most notorious is the Vie privée du maréchal de Richelieu (Paris, 1790, 3 vol. in-8°). It contains interesting anecdotes intended to scandal, including the romantic adventure of Duke de Richelieu, with Mme Michelin, nicknamed la belle tapissière.

== Sources ==
- Grand dictionnaire universel du XIXe;français, historique, géographique, mythologique, bibliographique (in French). Vol. 8. Paris: Administration du grand Dictionnaire universel. 1866–1877. p. 145..
- Biographie universelle, ancienne et moderne (Supplément), Paris : Louis-Gabriel Michaud, 1838, vol.64, p. 19-20
