= Victor Adolphe Malte-Brun =

French geographer and cartographer

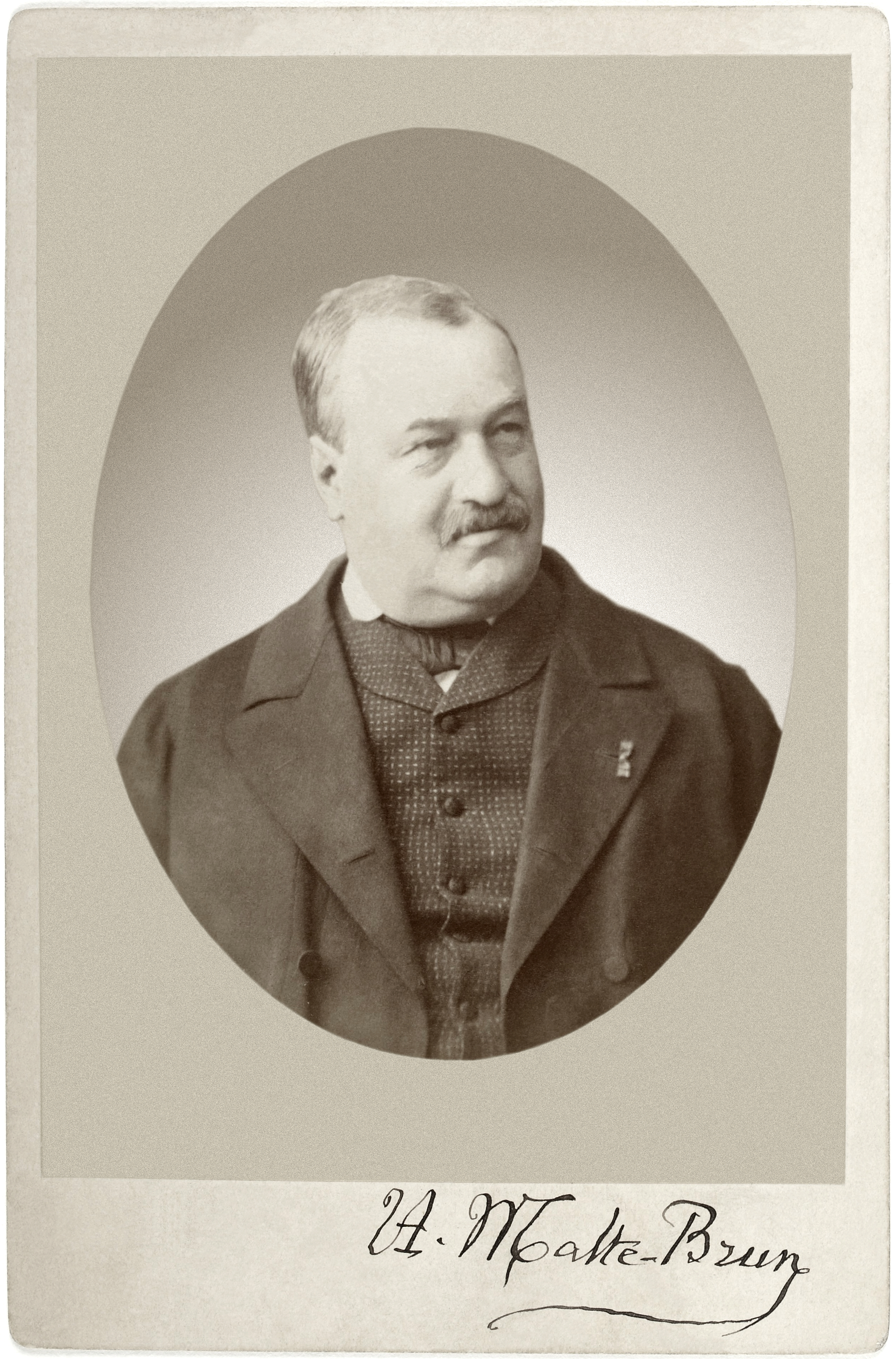
Photograph of Victor Adolphe Malte-Brun, from the Bibliothèque nationale de France

Victor Adolphe Malte-Brun (25 November 1816 – 13 July 1889) was a French geographer and cartographer.

== Biography ==
He was born in Paris, France, the son of Conrad Malte-Brun, another geographer of Danish origin, and founder of the Société de Géographie. After having been a professor of history in several colleges, he devoted himself especially to geographical studies.

In 1851, Victor Adolphe Malte-Brun became a member of the Société de Géographie, and quickly rose to be its secretary-general. He was also the principal editor of the Nouvelles Annales des Voyage.

He died in Marcoussis in the Essonne département and is buried in the Cimetière du Montparnasse in Paris.

== Legacy ==
His name was given to the street in Marcoussis where he once lived.

Mount Malte-Brun in New Zealand's Southern Alps was named, by Sir Julius von Haast, after him.

== Partial bibliography ==
- Jeunes voyageurs en France (1840)
- Destinée de Sir John Franklin dévoilée (1860)
- Nouvelles acquisitions des Russes dans l'Asie orientale (1861)
- Les États-Unis et le Mexique (1862)
- Coup d'œil sur le Yucatan (1864)
- Sonora et ses mines (1864)
- Canal interocéanique du Darien (1865)
- Histoire de Marcoussis (History of Marcoussis) (1867)
- Histoire géographique et statistique de l'Allemagne (4to, 1866-'8)
- La France illustrée (Illustrated France, volumes I and V, 1882)

He also published a revised edition of his father's geography (8 vols., 1852–55).
