= Lendenfeld Peak =

Mountain in New Zealand

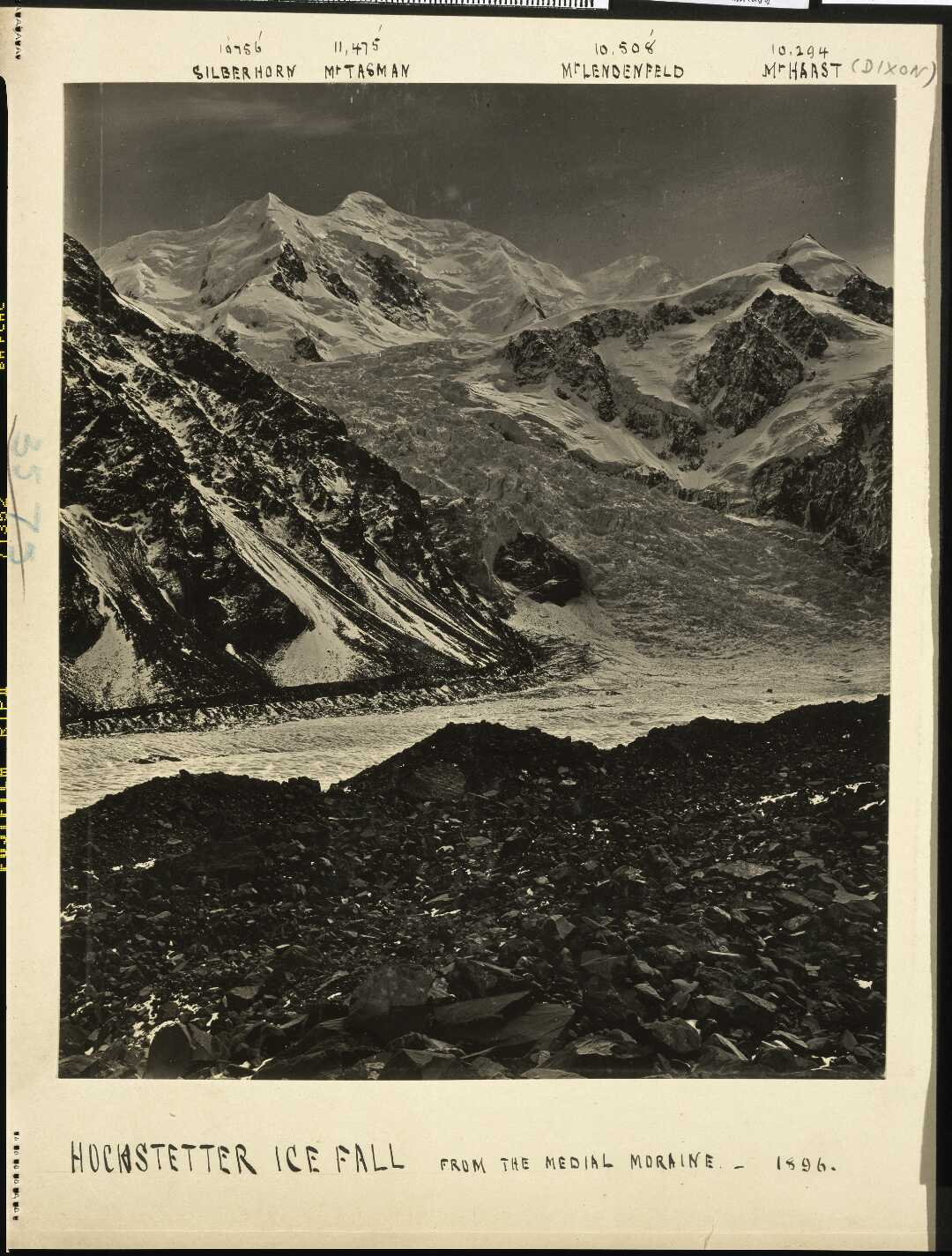
- Lendenfeld Peak (second from right), with the Hochstetter Glacier in the foreground

Highest point
- Elevation: 3,194 m (10,479 ft)
- Prominence: 101 m (331 ft)
- Coordinates: 43°33′37″S 170°10′10″E

Geography
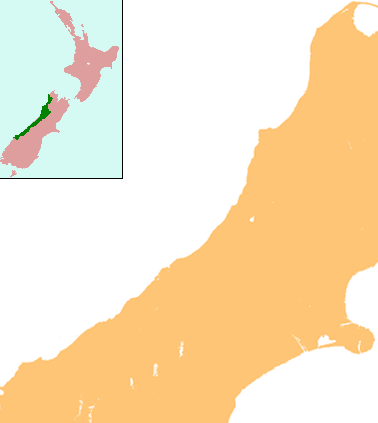
- Location within West Coast
- Location: South Island, New Zealand
- Parent range: Southern Alps

Climbing
- First ascent: February 1907 by Alex Graham and Henry Newton

Lendenfeld Peak (3,194 metres or 10,479 feet), in the past also Mount Lendenfeld, is the eighth highest named summit in New Zealand and in Aoraki / Mount Cook National Park.

The summit is named after the Austrian zoologist and mountaineer Robert J. Lendlmayer von Lendenfeld. It is on the northeast ridge of Mount Tasman, separated from it by the Engineer Col (3093 m). It is normally climbed from the New Zealand Alpine Club hut on the Fox Glacier. The normal route from the Marcel Col (2,987 metres or 9,800 feet) over the east ridge is a relatively easy ascent in good conditions. The best time to climb this mountain is between September and March.

== See also ==
- List of mountains of New Zealand by height
