= Independent income =

Stream of income

Independent income is a stream of income received without directly exchanging labour power for it. Examples are interest on money capital, dividends earned by share ownership, rental income, etc.

Many economists and other professionals consider that there is a need in modern capitalist economies for policies that encourage the acquisition of income generating capital assets that supplement or replace employment generated income. This need, it is argued, is driven by the progressive replacement of labour by capital in modern production.

Traditional economic theory counters this by contending that employment created in the growing service sector can absorb labour displaced in manufacturing. But this is by no means a smooth process since extensive retraining may be required before labour can be transferred to entirely new areas of activity.
