= Mount Dampier =

Mountain on South Island, New Zealand

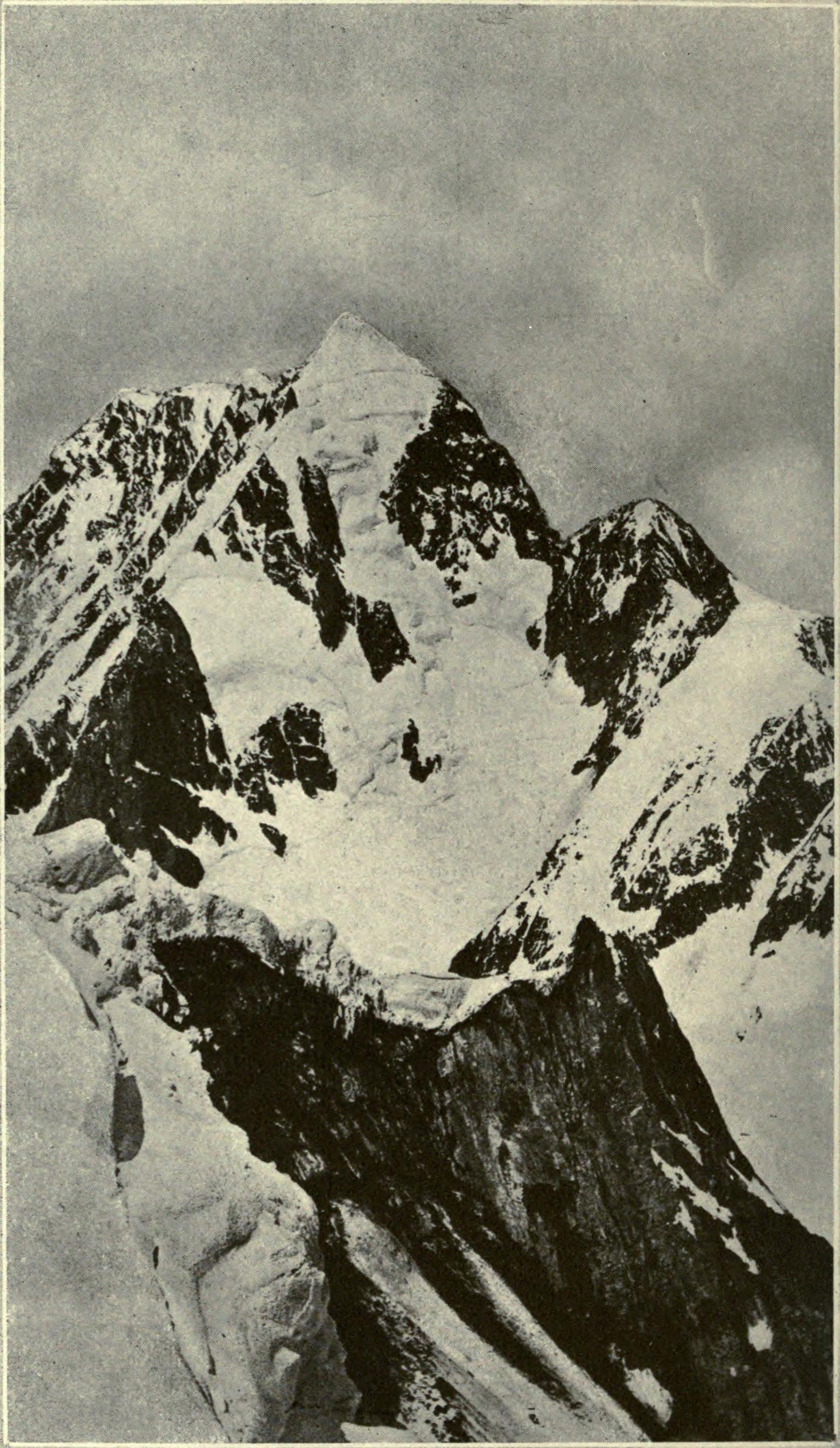
- Aoraki (middle) and Mount Dampier (right)

Highest point
- Elevation: 3,440 m (11,290 ft)
- Prominence: 92 m (302 ft)
- Coordinates: 43°35′S 170°8′E

Naming
- Native name: Rakiroa (Māori)

Geography
- Location within New Zealand
- Location: South Island, New Zealand
- Parent range: Southern Alps

Climbing
- First ascent: March 1912, by Freda Du Faur & Peter Graham

Mount Dampier (Māori: Rakiroa, transl. long sky) is New Zealand's third highest mountain, rising to 3,440 metres (11,290 ft). It is located in the Southern Alps, between Mount Hicks and Aoraki / Mount Cook. It is often traversed by climbers en route to the North ridge of Mount Cook. Its Māori name is from the words rangi (transl. 'sky') and roa (transl. 'long').

The English name was originally Mount Hector, after James Hector, but in Fitzgerald's map of 1896 the peak had been renamed after William Dampier.

The first ascent of Mount Dampier was made by Australian mountaineer Freda Du Faur in 1912.

A group of three climbers were killed by an avalanche on the mountain in 1914 while attempting to reach the summit.

Several attempts to ascend the mountain again were made, with another group of three climbers successfully reaching the summit for a second time in 1938.

The mountain was later climbed by Edmund Hillary while he was training as a mountaineer with Harry Ayres.

== See also ==
- List of mountains of New Zealand by height
