= Mount Sealy =

Mountain in New Zealand

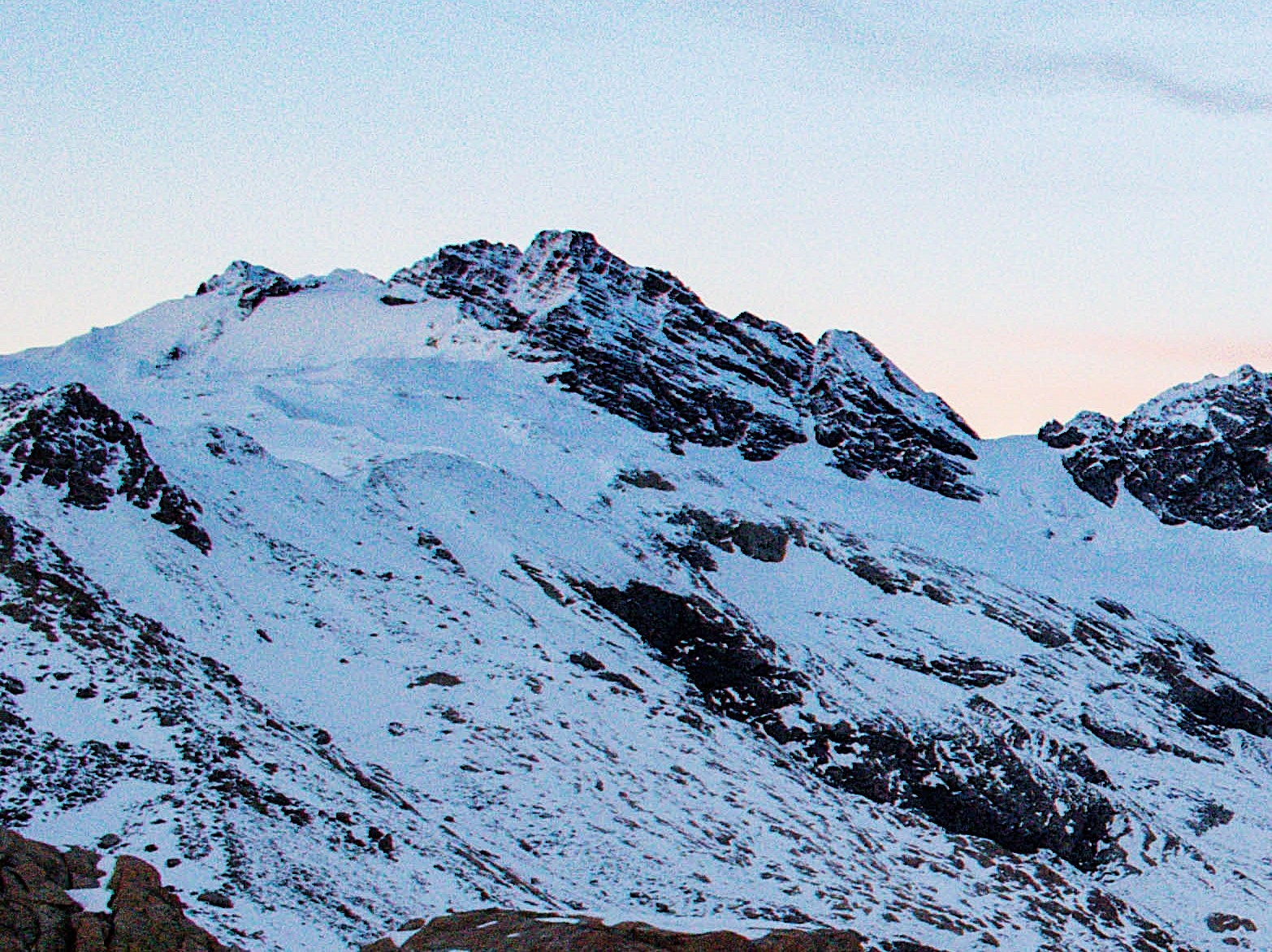
- North aspect, viewed from Mueller Hut

Highest point
- Elevation: 2,627 m (8,619 ft)
- Prominence: 635 m (2,083 ft)
- Isolation: 5.02 km (3.12 mi)
- Listing: New Zealand #36
- Coordinates: 43°45′54″S 170°02′43″E

Naming
- Etymology: Edward Sealy

Geography
- Location within New Zealand
- Interactive map of Mount Sealy
- Location: South Island
- Country: New Zealand
- Region: Canterbury
- Protected area: Aoraki / Mount Cook National Park
- Parent range: Southern Alps; Sealy Range
- Topo map(s): NZMS260 H36; Topo50 BY15

Climbing
- First ascent: January 1895

Mount Sealy is a 2,627-metre-elevation (8,619-foot) mountain in Canterbury Region of New Zealand.

== Description ==
Mount Sealy is located in the Southern Alps and the Canterbury Region of South Island. This peak is situated five kilometres (3.1 mi) southwest of Mount Cook Village and set within Aoraki / Mount Cook National Park. Precipitation runoff from the mountain drains south into the headwaters of the Dobson River, and north to the Hooker River. Topographic relief is significant as the summit rises 1,050 metres (3,445 feet) above the Dobson headwaters in one kilometre. The nearest higher neighbour is Mount Burns, three kilometres to the west-northwest. The mountain's toponym was applied by Julius von Haast to honour Edward Sealy (1839–1903), a New Zealand surveyor, photographer, and explorer.

== Climbing ==
The first ascent of the summit was made in January 1895 by Jack Clarke, C.L. Barrow, and Edward FitzGerald via the East Ridge.

Climbing routes with the first ascents:

- North Face Couloir – Peter Graham, Claude Macdonald – (1909)
- North Face – Freda Du Faur, Peter Graham – (1909)
- West Face – Peter Graham, Mr. / Mrs. L.H. Lindon, B. Spencer, W. Fisher – (1911)
- North West Ridge – Otto Frind, Conrad Kain – (1914)
- Prime Time (South Face) – Peter Dickson, Bill McLeod – (1993)
- Hello Darkness (South Face) – Bill McLeod – (1994)
- Ice Gangsters (South Face) – Steve Fortune, Jamie Vinton-Boot – (2012)

== Climate ==
Based on the Köppen climate classification, Mount Sealy is located in a marine west coast (Cfb) climate zone, with a subpolar oceanic climate (Cfc) at the summit. Prevailing westerly winds blow moist air from the Tasman Sea onto the mountains, where the air is forced upward by the mountains (orographic lift), causing moisture to drop in the form of rain or snow. This climate supports the Metelille and Sladden glaciers on the north and west slopes of the peak. The months of December through February offer the most favourable weather for viewing or climbing this peak.

== Gallery ==
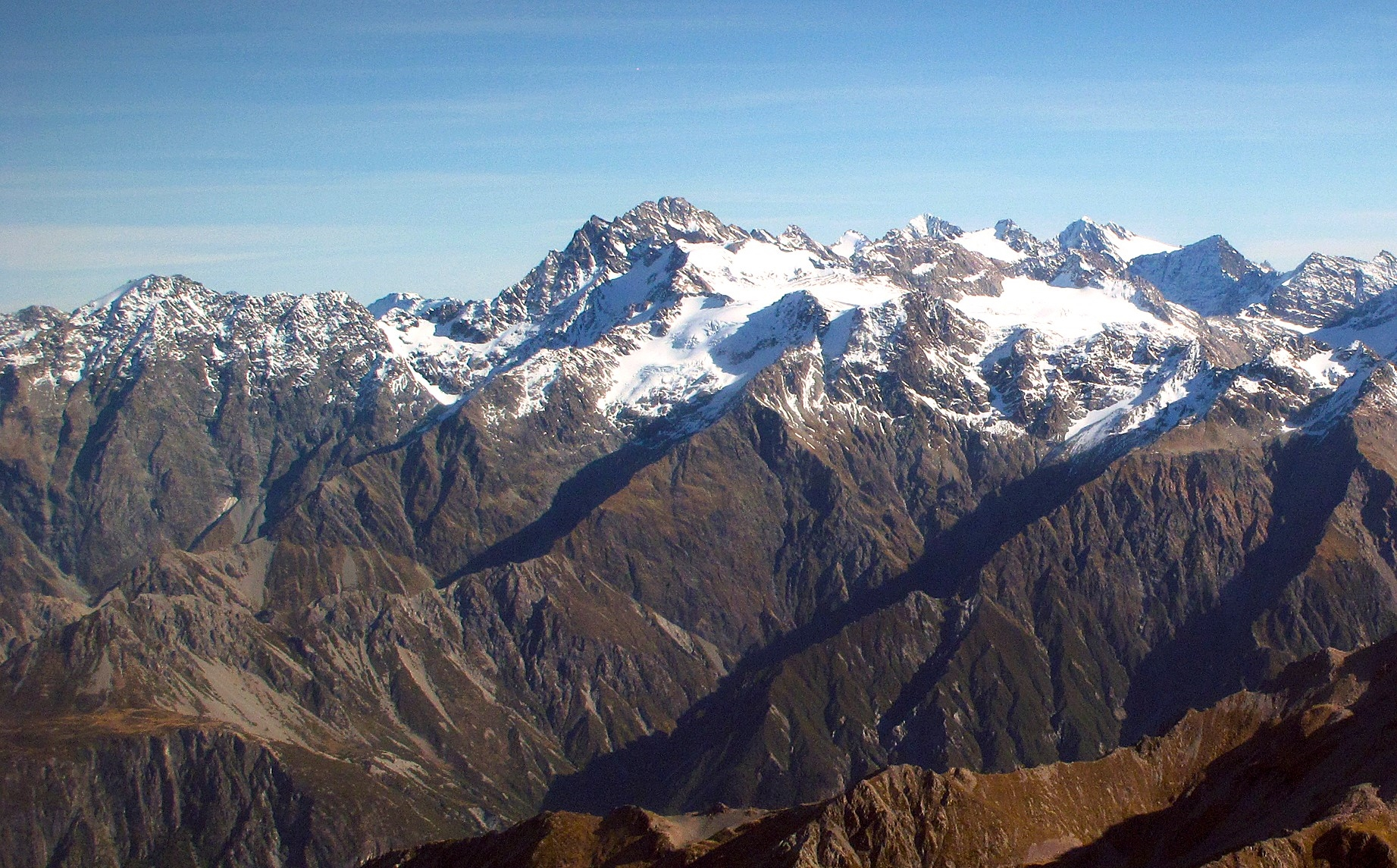
Aerial view from northeast

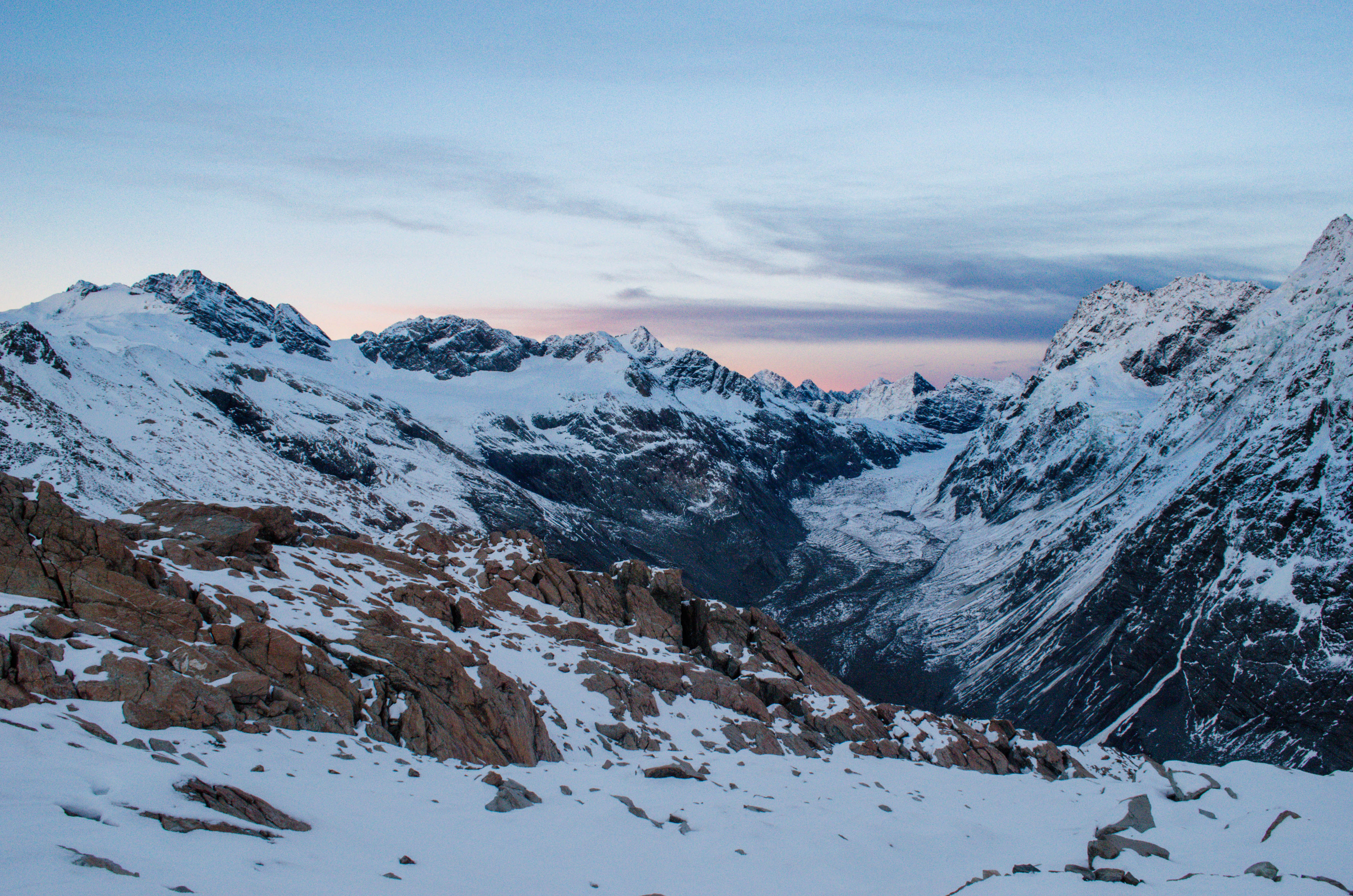
Mount Sealy in upper left of frame

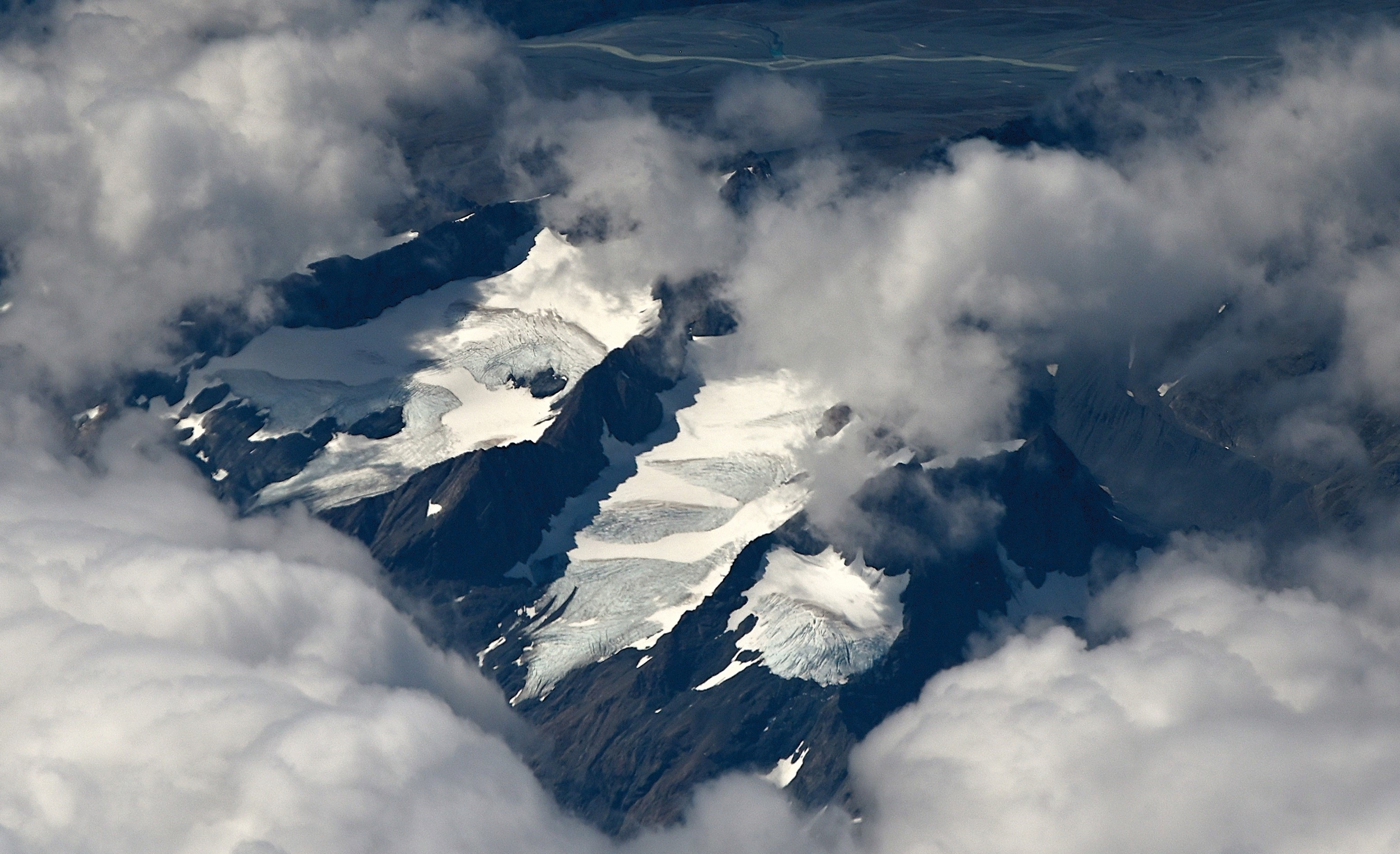
Aerial view of Mount Sealy from northwest showing Metelille Glacier, Sladden Glacier, and Williams Glacier.

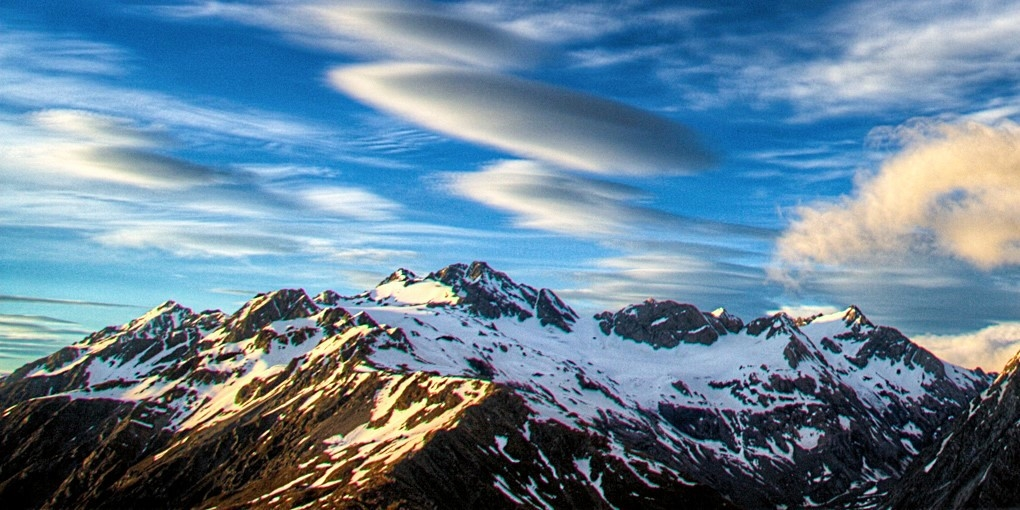
Sunrise on Mount Sealy

== See also ==
- List of mountains of New Zealand by height
