= Du Faur Creek =

River in Australia

Coordinates: 33°30′S 150°21′E

Du Faur
- Etymology: In honour of Frederick Du Faur

Location
- Country: Australia
- State: New South Wales
- Region: Sydney Basin (IBRA), Blue Mountains
- Municipality: City of Lithgow

Physical characteristics
- Source: Bell Range, Blue Mountains National Park
  - location: near Bell
- Mouth: confluence with Bell Creek
  - location: near Mount Wilson
- Length: 8 km (5.0 mi)

Basin features
- River system: Hawkesbury-Nepean catchment
- National park: Blue Mountains NP

The Du Faur Creek, a perennial stream of the Hawkesbury-Nepean catchment, is located in the Blue Mountains region of New South Wales, Australia.

== Course ==
The Du Faur Creek (officially designated as a river) rises on the Bell Range, about 5 kilometres (3.1 mi) south-east of Bell, and flows generally north north-east before reaching its confluence with Bell Creek, in remote country within the Blue Mountains National Park, west of Mount Wilson. The river has an 8-kilometre (5.0 mi) course.

The river is named in honour of Frederick Du Faur (1832–1915), an early Chief Draftsman of the NSW Department of Lands, a Fellow of the Royal Geographical Society and a Trustee of the Art Gallery of New South Wales.

== See also ==
- List of rivers of Australia
- List of rivers in New South Wales (A-K)
- Rivers of New South Wales
