= Haeckel Peak =

Mountain in New Zealand

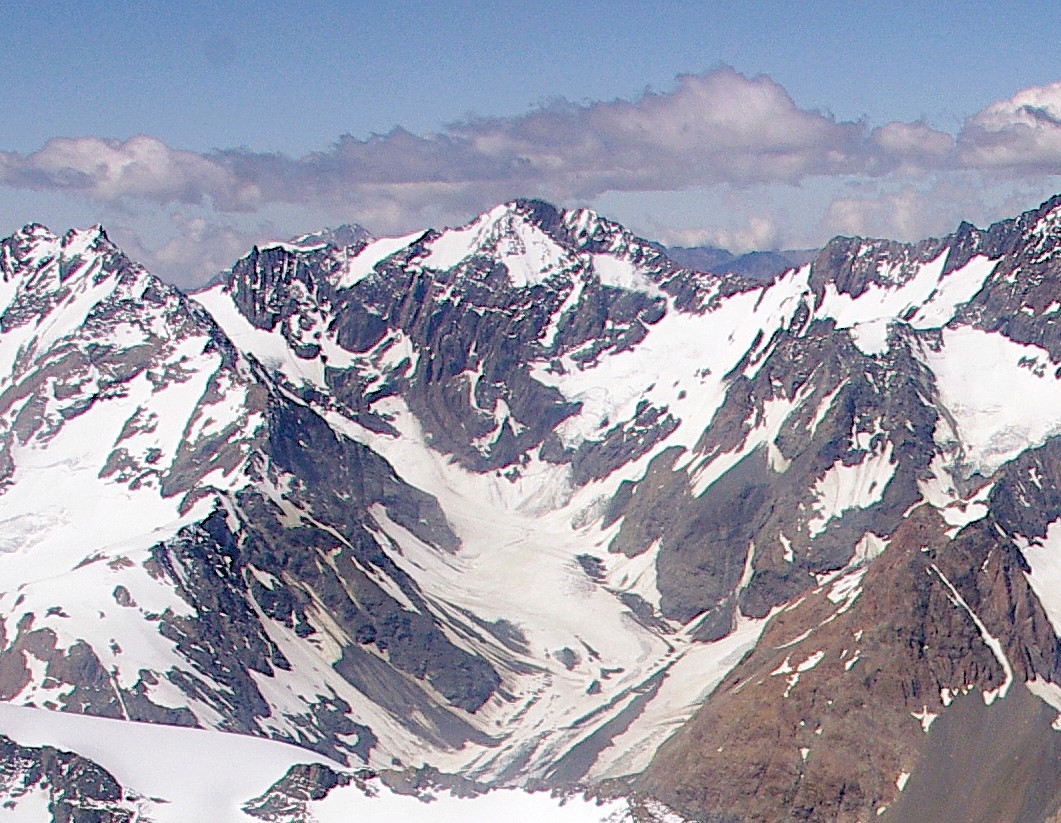
- West aspect, centred

Highest point
- Elevation: 2,965 m (9,728 ft)
- Prominence: 245 m (804 ft)
- Parent peak: Mount Hamilton
- Isolation: 1.96 km (1.22 mi)
- Listing: Mountains of New Zealand
- Coordinates: 43°32′25″S 170°20′44″E

Naming
- Etymology: Ernst Haeckel

Geography
- Location within New Zealand
- Interactive map of Haeckel Peak
- Location: South Island
- Country: New Zealand
- Region: Canterbury
- Protected area: Aoraki / Mount Cook National Park
- Parent range: Southern Alps; Malte Brun Range
- Topo map: NZMS260 I36

Climbing
- First ascent: 1912

Haeckel Peak is a 2,965-metre-elevation (9,728-foot) mountain in the Canterbury Region of New Zealand.

== Description ==
Haeckel Peak is set in the Malte Brun Range of the Southern Alps and is situated in the Canterbury Region of South Island. This remote peak is located 17 kilometres (11 mi) northeast of Aoraki / Mount Cook in Aoraki / Mount Cook National Park. Topographic relief is significant as the summit rises 900 metres (2,953 feet) above the Darwin Glacier in one kilometre, and 1,635 metres (5,364 feet) above the Murchison Glacier in three kilometres. Precipitation runoff from the mountain drains to the Tasman River. The nearest higher peak is Mount Hamilton, two kilometres to the southwest. The first ascent of the summit was made in January 1912 by Jack Clarke, Bernard Head, and Jim Murphy. The mountain's toponym was applied by Robert J. Lendlmayer von Lendenfeld to honour Ernst Haeckel (1834–1919), botanist at the University of Jena, Germany.

== Climbing ==
Climbing routes on Haeckel Peak:

- South West Ridge – Jack Clarke, Bernard Head, Jim Murphy – (1912)
- West Face – Otto Frind, Conrad Kain – (1914)
- East Ridge – R.M. Crockett, W.G. McClymont, F.F. Simmons – (1934)
- North Ridge (descent) – R.M. Crockett, W.G. McClymont, F.F. Simmons – (1934)

== Climate ==
Based on the Köppen climate classification, Haeckel Peak is located in a marine west coast (Cfb) climate zone, with a subpolar oceanic climate (Cfc) at the summit. Prevailing westerly winds blow moist air from the Tasman Sea onto the mountains, where the air is forced upward by the mountains (orographic lift), causing moisture to drop in the form of rain or snow. This climate supports the Darwin, Dixon, and Mannering glaciers surrounding the peak. The months of December through February offer the most favourable weather for viewing or climbing this peak.

== See also ==
- List of mountains of New Zealand by height
