= Malte Brun (mountain) =

Mountain in New Zealand

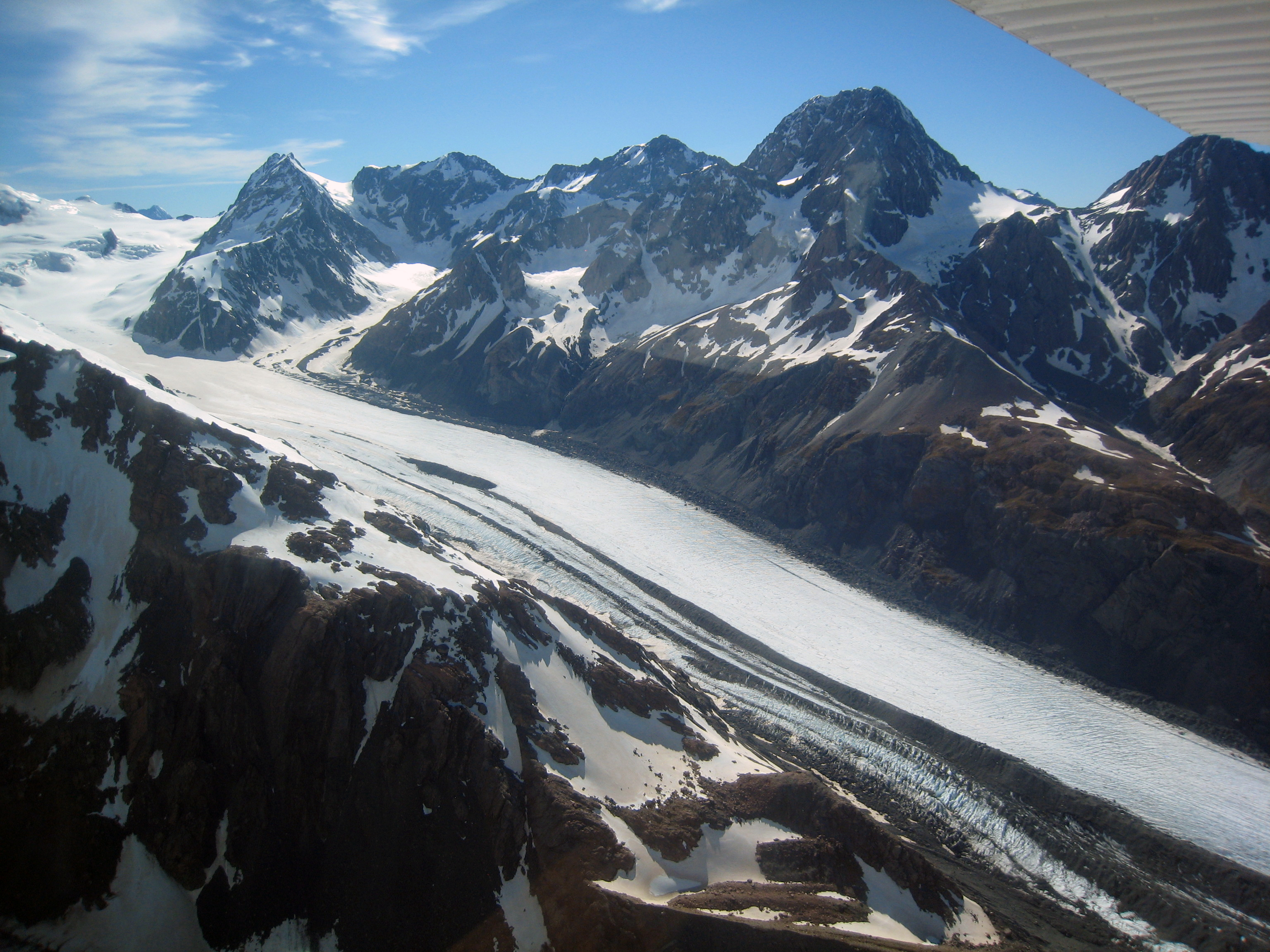
- Malte Brun (upper right) rises beyond the Tasman Glacier

Highest point
- Elevation: 3,199 m (10,495 ft)
- Prominence: 780 m (2,560 ft)
- Listing: New Zealand #3
- Coordinates: 43°33′50″S 170°18′17″E

Geography
- Location within South Island
- Location: South Island, New Zealand
- Parent range: Malte Brun Range, Southern Alps

Climbing
- First ascent: 1894, by Tom Fyfe

Malte Brun is the highest peak in the Malte Brun Range, which lies between the Tasman and Murchison Glaciers within New Zealand's Southern Alps. According to Land Information New Zealand, it rises to a height of 3,199 metres (10,495 ft), although other sources give heights ranging from 3155 to 3199 m. A list published by the New Zealand Alpine Club ranks Malte Brun as the third highest mountain in New Zealand.

It was named by Julius von Haast after the French geographer Victor Adolphe Malte-Brun.

== Climbing ==
Malte Brun was first ascended by Tom Fyfe (solo climb) in March 1894 via the North Face. Today, many climbing routes lie on the mountain, all of which require technical experience and equipment. The classic route is the West Ridge which includes the "Cheval", a knife edge ridge traversed by straddling. Some of the major climbing routes on Malte Brun include:

- West Ridge (NZ Alpine grade 3+)
- South Ridge (NZ Alpine Grade 3)
- South Face (NZ Alpine Grades 4 – 4+)

Two huts servicing climbers used to exist on the lower slopes: the Beetham hut in the Beetham Valley, and the Malte Brun Hut on moraine terraces above the Tasman Glacier. The Beetham hut was destroyed by an avalanche in the early 1990s.

== See also ==
- List of mountains of New Zealand by height
