= Minaret (disambiguation) =

Minaret is a tower-like component of a mosque.

Minaret or minar may also refer to:

- Minaret of Jam, Afghanistan
- Minaret College, an Islamic, independent school in Australia
- Minaret Summit, a mountain pass in Australia
- Minar (Firuzabad), a tower-like structure at the center of Firuzabad, Iran
- Minaq or Minar, a village in Iran
- Minaret of Israel
- Minar-e-Pakistan
- Minarets (California), a mountain formation in the United States
- The Minarets (New Zealand), two mountains in New Zealand
- Minaret (novel), a 2005 novel by Leila Aboulela
- Minaret (band), an Azerbaijani rock band
- Project MINARET, a National Security Agency surveillance operation
- Minar Rahman or Minar (born 1992), Bangladeshi lyricist, composer, singer, actor and cartoonist
- Menorahs and Minarets, a 2017 book by Kamal Ruhayyim

== See also ==
- Menar (disambiguation)
- Menareh Bazar or Minar-Bazar, a village in Iran
- Minarets (disambiguation)
