= Minarets (disambiguation) =

A minaret is an architectural feature of Islamic mosques.

Minarets may also refer to:

- Minarets, California, a former town in California
- Minarets (California), mountain peaks in the Sierra Nevada Mountains of California
- "Minarets," a song by Dave Matthews Band on their 1993 album Remember Two Things
- The Minarets (New Zealand), mountain peaks in New Zealand's South Island

== See also ==
- Minaret (disambiguation)
