= Mount Rudolf =

Mountain in New Zealand

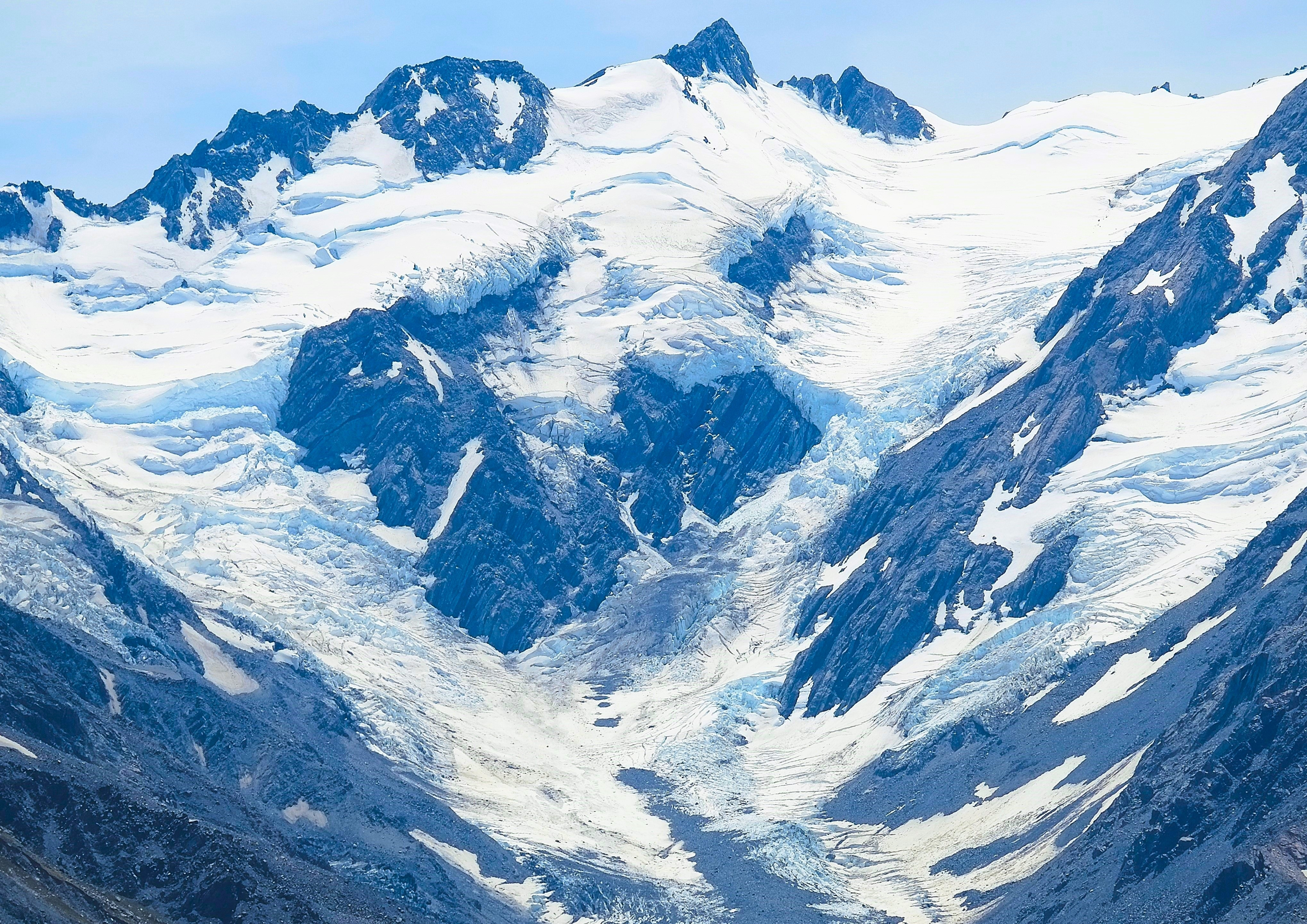
- South aspect, with Rudolf Glacier

Highest point
- Elevation: 2,743 m (8,999 ft)
- Prominence: 108 m (354 ft)
- Isolation: 1.66 km (1.03 mi)
- Coordinates: 43°30′36″S 170°15′14″E

Naming
- Etymology: Rudolf, Crown Prince of Austria

Geography
- Location within New Zealand
- Interactive map of Mount Rudolf
- Location: South Island
- Country: New Zealand
- Region: Canterbury / West Coast
- Protected area: Aoraki / Mount Cook National Park; Westland Tai Poutini National Park
- Parent range: Southern Alps
- Topo map(s): NZMS260 H34; Topo50 BX16

Climbing
- First ascent: January 1914

Mount Rudolf is a 2,743-metre-elevation (8,999-foot) mountain in New Zealand.

== Description ==
Mount Rudolf is set on the crest or Main Divide of the Southern Alps and is situated on the boundary shared by the West Coast and Canterbury Regions of the South Island. This peak is located 13 kilometres (8.1 mi) northeast of Aoraki / Mount Cook and set on the boundary shared by Aoraki / Mount Cook National Park and Westland Tai Poutini National Park. Precipitation runoff from the mountain drains north to the Waiho River and south to the Tasman River. Topographic relief is significant as the summit rises 1,040 metres (3,412 feet) above the Rudolf Glacier in two kilometres. The nearest higher peak is The Minarets, 1.66 kilometre to the east. The toponyms of the mountain and glacier were applied by Dr. Robert von Lendenfeld to honour Rudolf, Crown Prince of Austria (1858–1889), the son of Emperor Franz Josef.

== Climbing ==
The first ascent of the summit was made in January 1914 by Peter Graham and his wife, Elizabeth Muriel Graham. Their route was the Northeast Arête from Graham Saddle. The newlyweds had recently married on 1 October 1913.

Climbing routes with the first ascents:

- Dawes-MacInnes Buttress – Hamish MacInnes, D. Dawe – (1955)
- A Nice Affair – Don French – (1994)
- Big Day Out – FA party unknown – (1997)
- Right Gully (West Face)

== Climate ==
Based on the Köppen climate classification, Mount Rudolf is located in a marine west coast (Cfb) climate zone, with a subpolar oceanic climate (Cfc) at the summit. Prevailing westerly winds blow moist air from the Tasman Sea onto the mountains, where the air is forced upwards by the mountains (orographic lift), causing moisture to drop in the form of rain or snow. This climate supports the Franz Josef and Rudolf glaciers surrounding the peak. The months of December through February offer the most favourable weather for viewing or climbing this peak.

== See also ==
- List of mountains of New Zealand by height

== Gallery ==
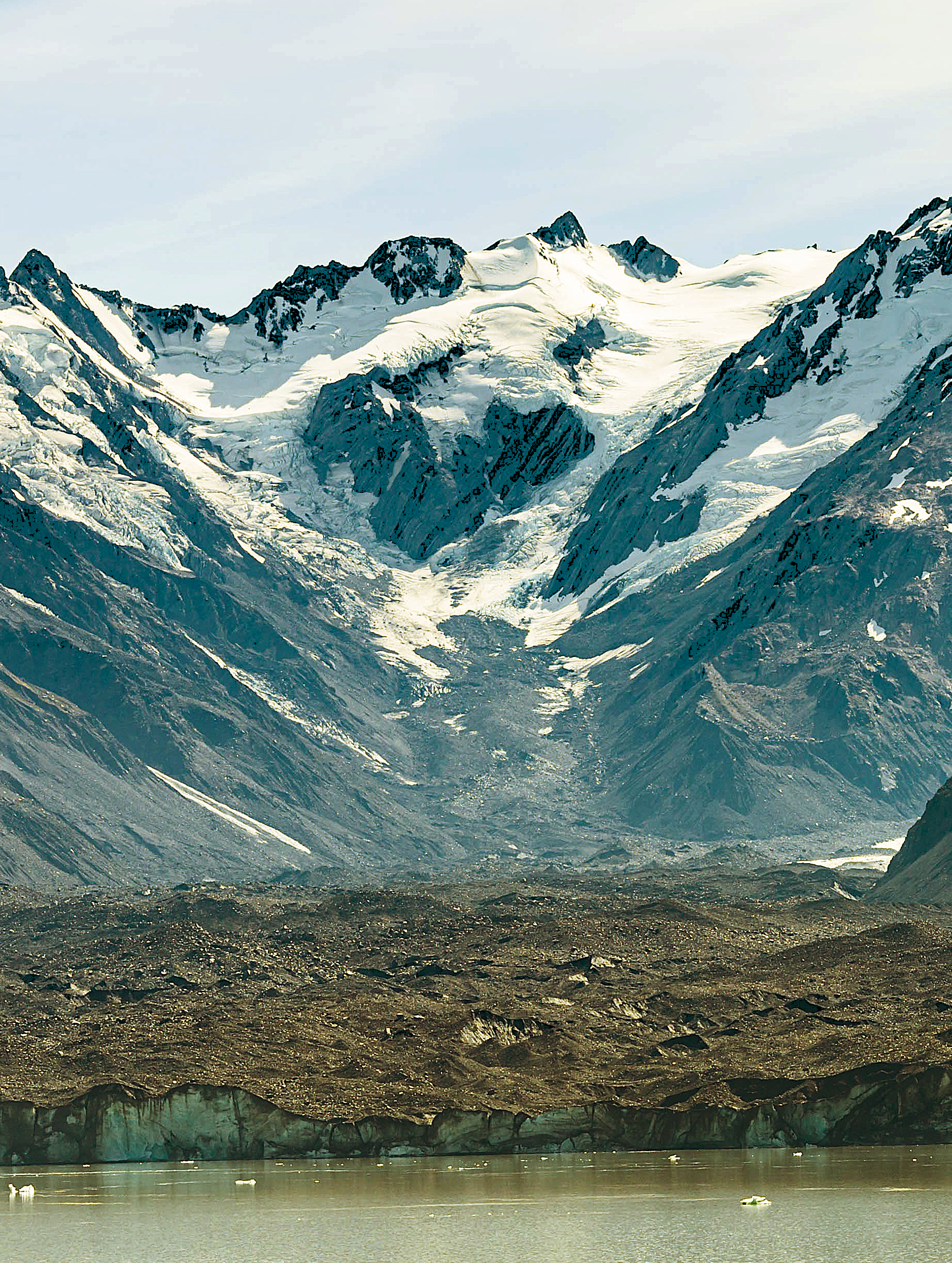

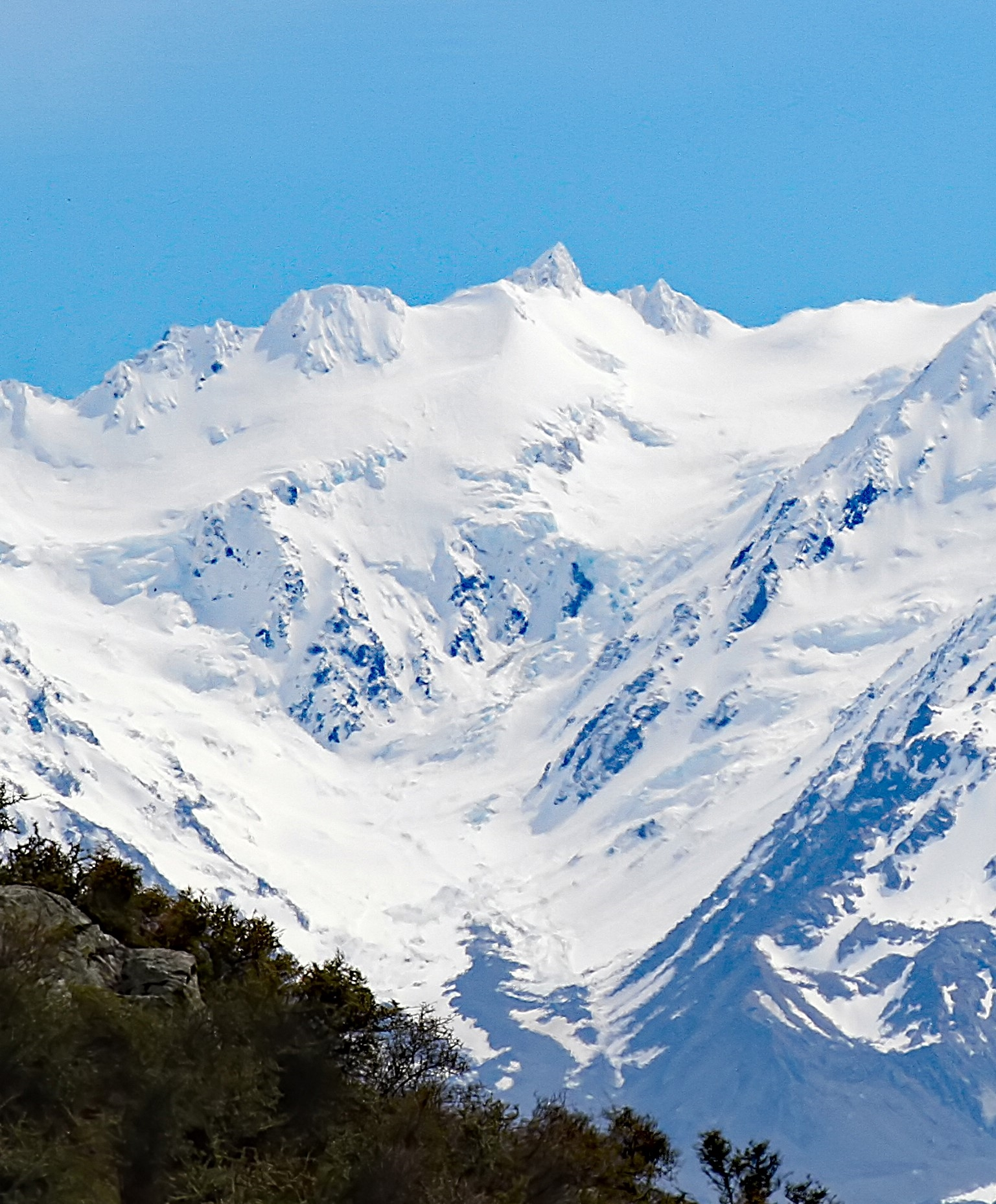

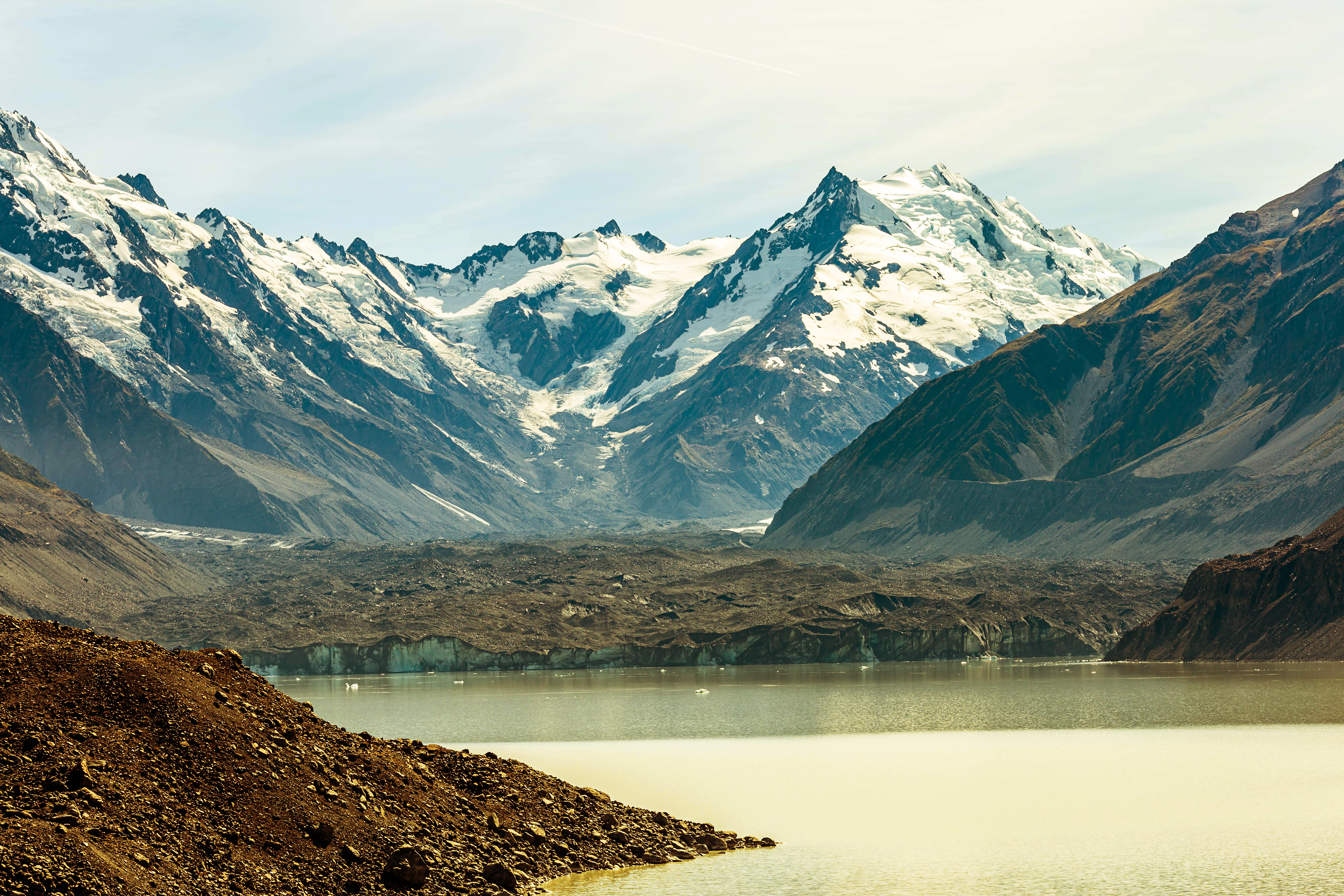
Mount Rudolf centred in the distance, and The Minarets (right).
Tasman Lake in foreground.

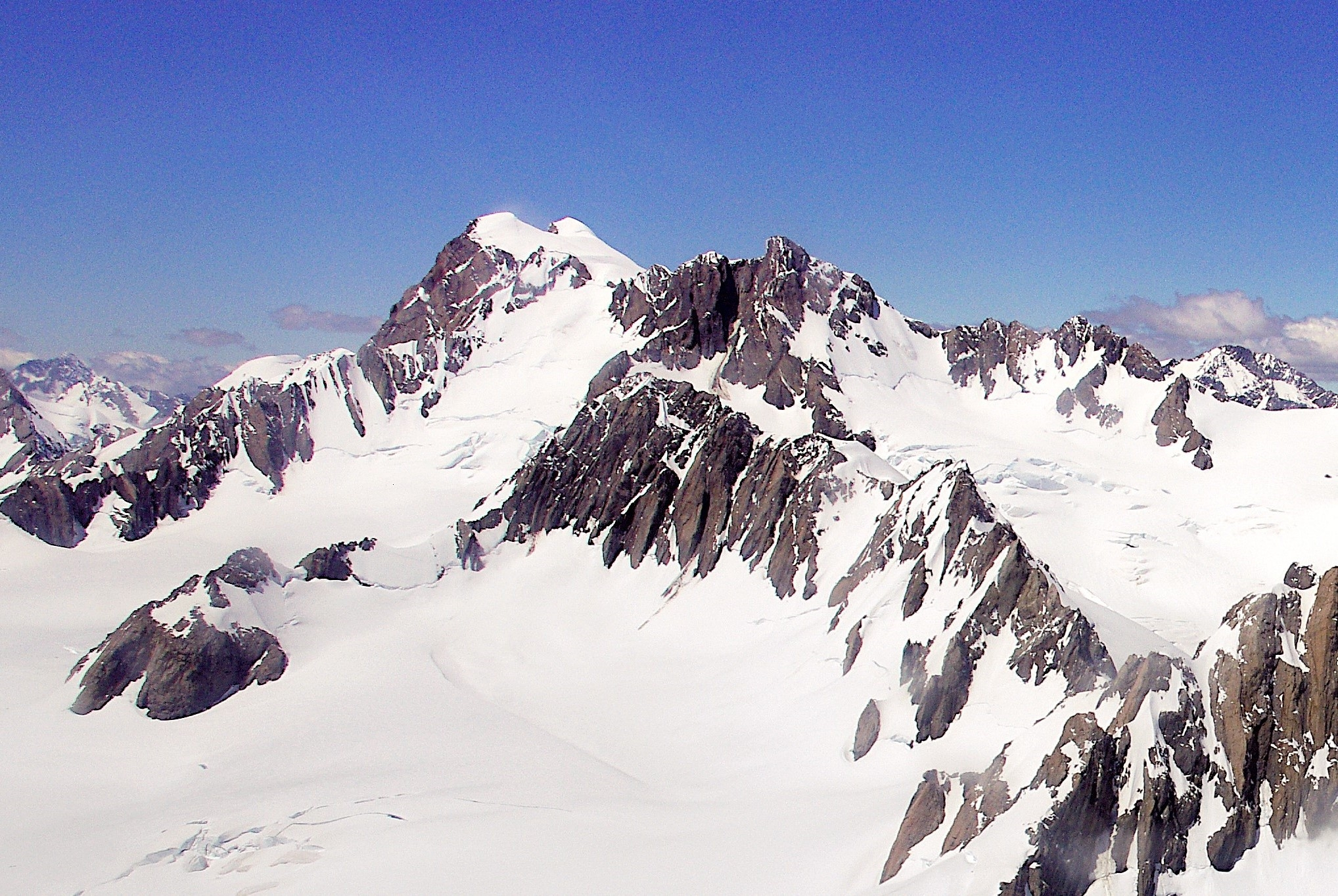
Aerial view from west with Mount Rudolf centred.
De La Beche and The Minarets in back.

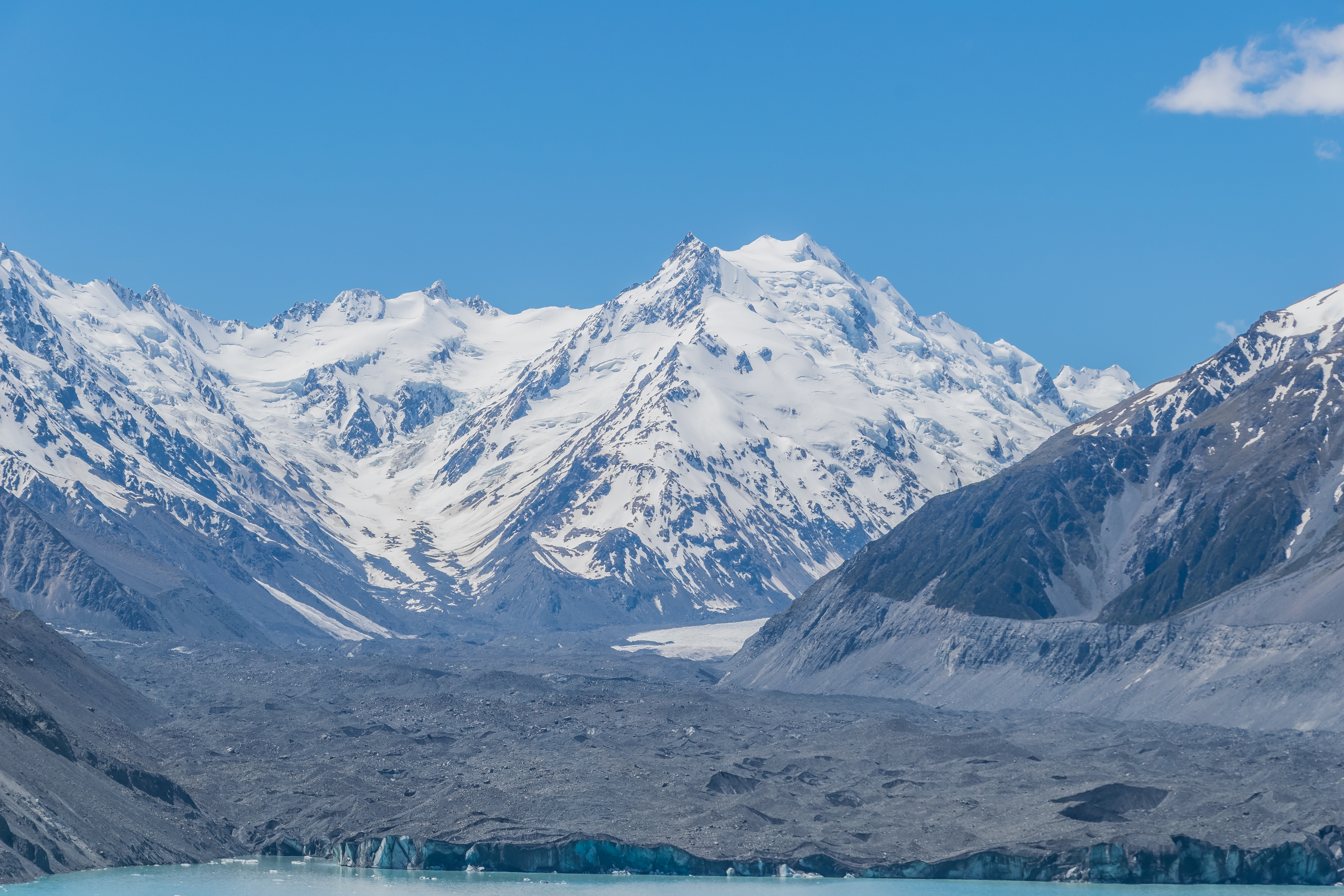
Mount Rudolf (left) and The Minarets (right).
Tasman Glacier in the foreground.
