= Henry De la Beche =

English geologist and palaeontologist (1796–1855)

Sir Henry De la Beche KCB FRS
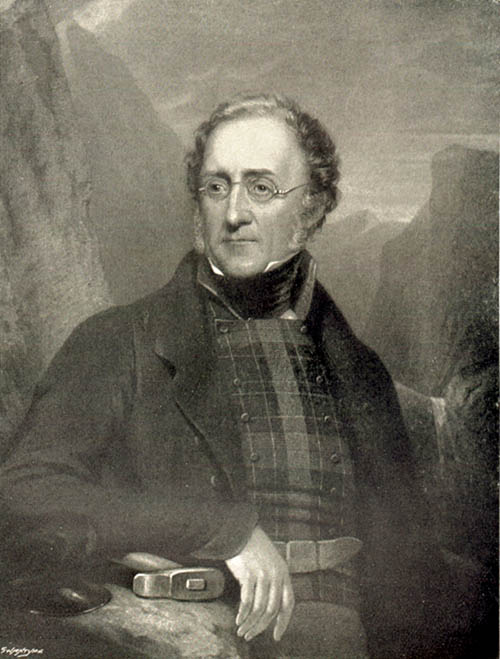
- Born: 10 February 1796; London, England
- Died: 13 April 1855 (aged 59); London, England
- Known for: Painting Duria Antiquior – A More Ancient Dorset
- Awards: Wollaston Medal (1855)
- Scientific career
- Fields: Geology, palaeontology
- Workplaces: Geological Survey of Great Britain

Signature
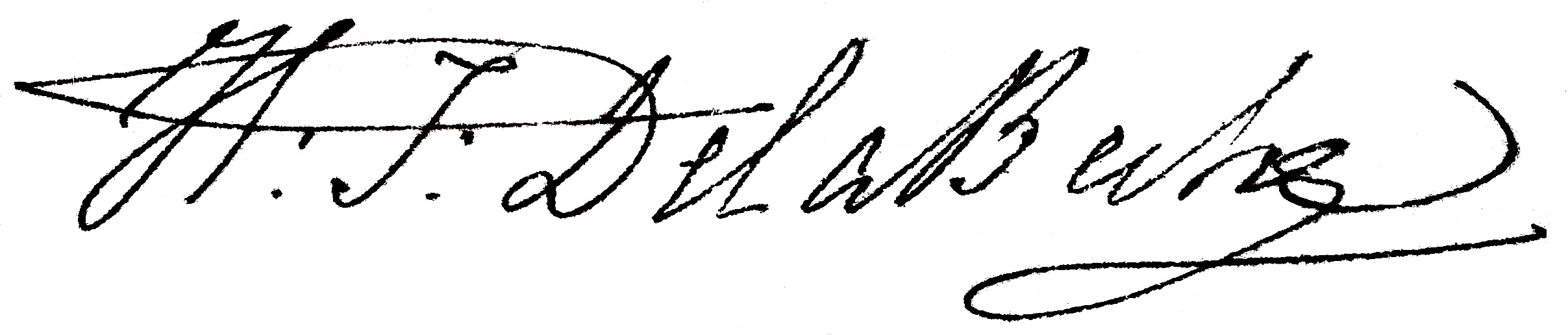

Sir Henry Thomas De la Beche (Note: The British Geological Survey use the form "De la Beche", not "Beche"; so too does the National Museum Wales in its De la Beche archive.) KCB, FRS (10 February 1796 – 13 April 1855) was an English geologist and palaeontologist, the first director of the Geological Survey of Great Britain, who helped pioneer early geological survey methods. He was the first President of the Palaeontographical Society. He was also a slave plantation owner in Jamaica.

== Biography ==
De la Beche was born in Welbeck Street, Cavendish Square, London. He was the only son of Thomas De la Beche (1755–1801) and his wife, Elizabeth. The family name was originally Beach, but his father changed it to create a fictional connection with the medieval Barons De la Beche of Aldworth, Berkshire. Thomas (Henry's father) served as a brevet major (later lieutenant-colonel) in the Norfolk Yeomanry, a regiment of fencibles in the British Army, and his father was a slave owner with an estate in Jamaica. In 1800 the family travelled to the plantation in Jamaica when Thomas inherited the estate and Thomas died there in the following year. Mother and son (Henry) returned to England, having been shipwrecked to the north of San Domingo on their journey.

Henry De la Beche spent his early life living with his mother in Lyme Regis, where he acquired a love for geology through his friendship with Mary Anning. At the age of fourteen he entered the Royal Military College, then at Great Marlow in Buckinghamshire.

The peace of 1815, however, changed his career. At the age of twenty-one De la Beche joined the Geological Society of London. He became an avid fossil collector and illustrator, collaborating with William Conybeare on an important paper on ichthyosaur and plesiosaur anatomy that was presented before the Society in 1821. He continued throughout life to be one of its most active, useful and honoured members, serving as president of the Society from 1848 to 1849. He visited many localities of geological interest, not only in Britain, but also in France, Jamaica and Switzerland.

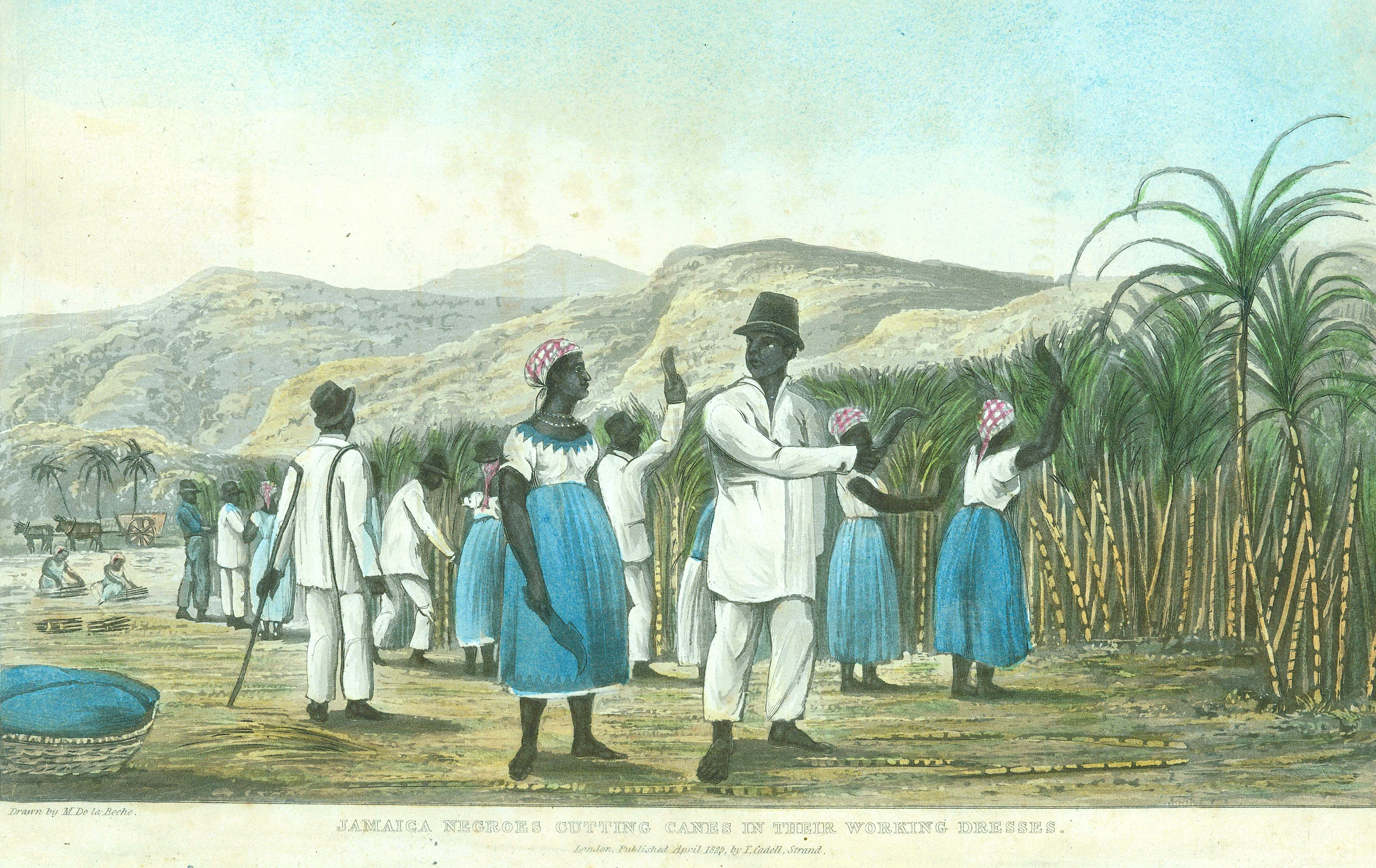
Idealised view of Slaves cutting sugar cane on a plantation in Jamaica, drawn by himself, 1825

In Jamaica he stayed on his estate, Halse Hall, Clarendon Parish, in 1823–1824 and published his geological account of Jamaica in 1827.

Following the Great Jamaican Slave Revolt in 1831, the British government decided to abolish slavery in the West Indies colonies in 1833. Compensation was paid, not to the slaves, but to the plantation owners. However, as De la Beche had mortgaged his properties, the money went to the Hibbert family.

Returning to the south-west of England he began the detailed investigation of the rocks of Cornwall and Devon. Contact with the mining community of that part of the country gave him the idea that the nation ought to compile a geological map of the United Kingdom, and collect and preserve specimens to illustrate, and aid in further developing, its mineral industries.

== Surveying ==
The government then appointed De la Beche to work with the Ordnance Survey. This formed the starting point of the Geological Survey of Great Britain, which was officially recognised in 1835, when De la Beche was appointed as director. As the first director of the Museum of Practical Geology in Jermyn Street, in 1843 he donated many of his own books to establish the library.

Increasing stores of valuable specimens began to arrive in London; and the building at Craig's Court, off Whitehall, where the young Museum of Economic (afterwards Practical) Geology was placed, became too small. De la Beche appealed to the authorities to provide a larger structure and to widen the whole scope of the scientific establishment of which he was the head. Parliament sanctioned the erection of a museum in Jermyn Street, London, and the organisation of a staff of professors with laboratories and other appliances. The establishment, in which were combined the offices of the Geological Survey, the Museum of Practical Geology, the Royal School of Mines and the Mining Record Office, was opened in 1851.

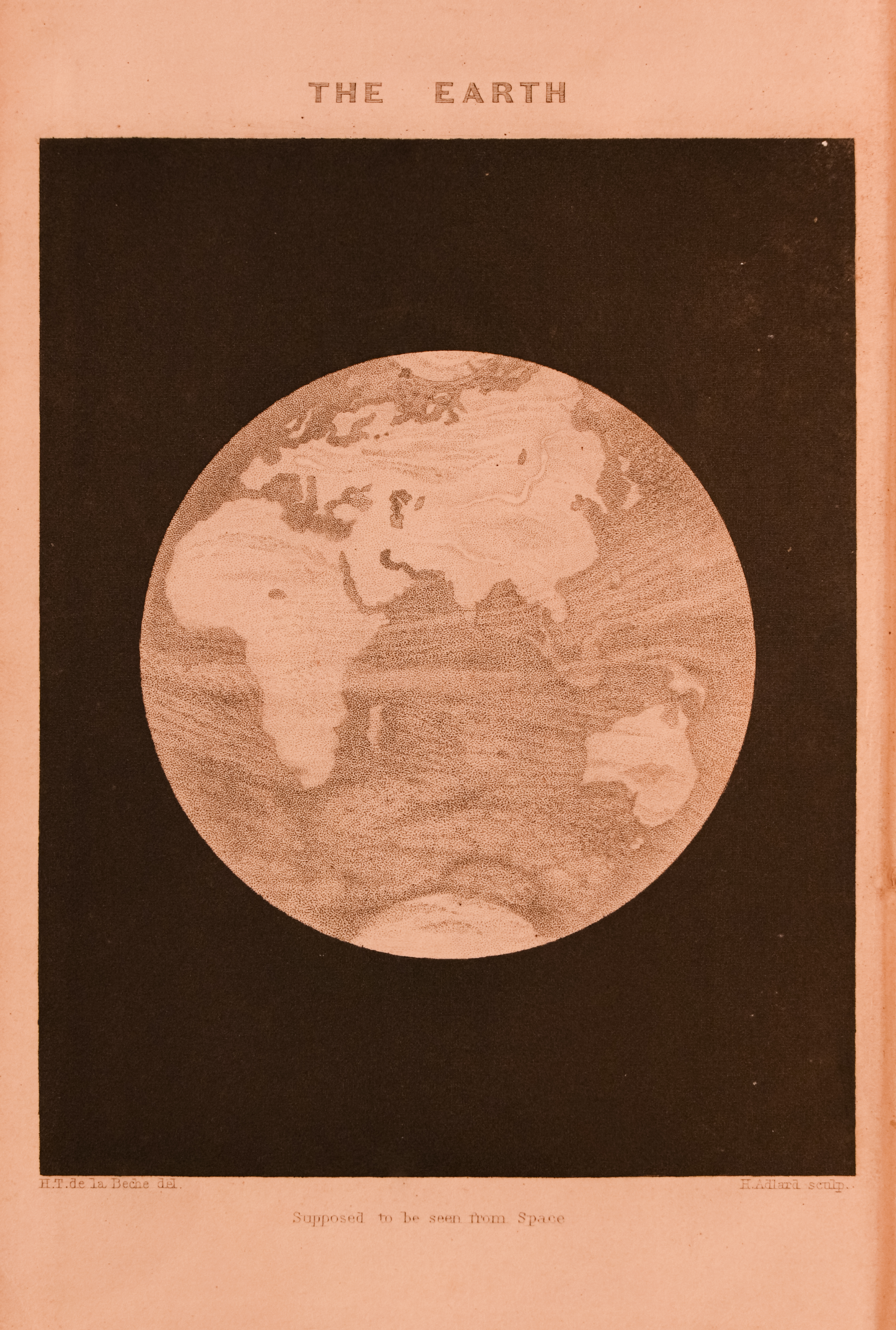
An 1834 etching by De la Beche that appears in the beginning of his Researches in Theoretical Geology. A landmark scientific depiction of Earth as seen from space.

Conditions of scientific testing were rudimentary; as part of his colleague Lyon Playfair's investigations into "overflowing privies", Sir Henry De la Beche once took the role of test-vomiter, to judge sewage flow.

In 1830, De la Beche published Sections and views, illustrative of geological phaenomena, a series of line drawings to encourage more accurate depictions of geological formations. He also published numerous memoirs on English geology in the Transactions of the Geological Society of London, as well as in the Memoirs of the Geological Survey, notably the Report on the Geology of Cornwall, Devon and West Somerset (1839). He likewise wrote A Geological Manual (1831; 3rd ed., 1833); and Researches in Theoretical Geology (1834), in which he enunciated a philosophical treatment of geological questions much in advance of his time. An early volume, How to Observe Geology (1835 and 1836), was rewritten and enlarged by him late in life, and published under the title of The Geological Observer (1851; 2nd ed., 1853).

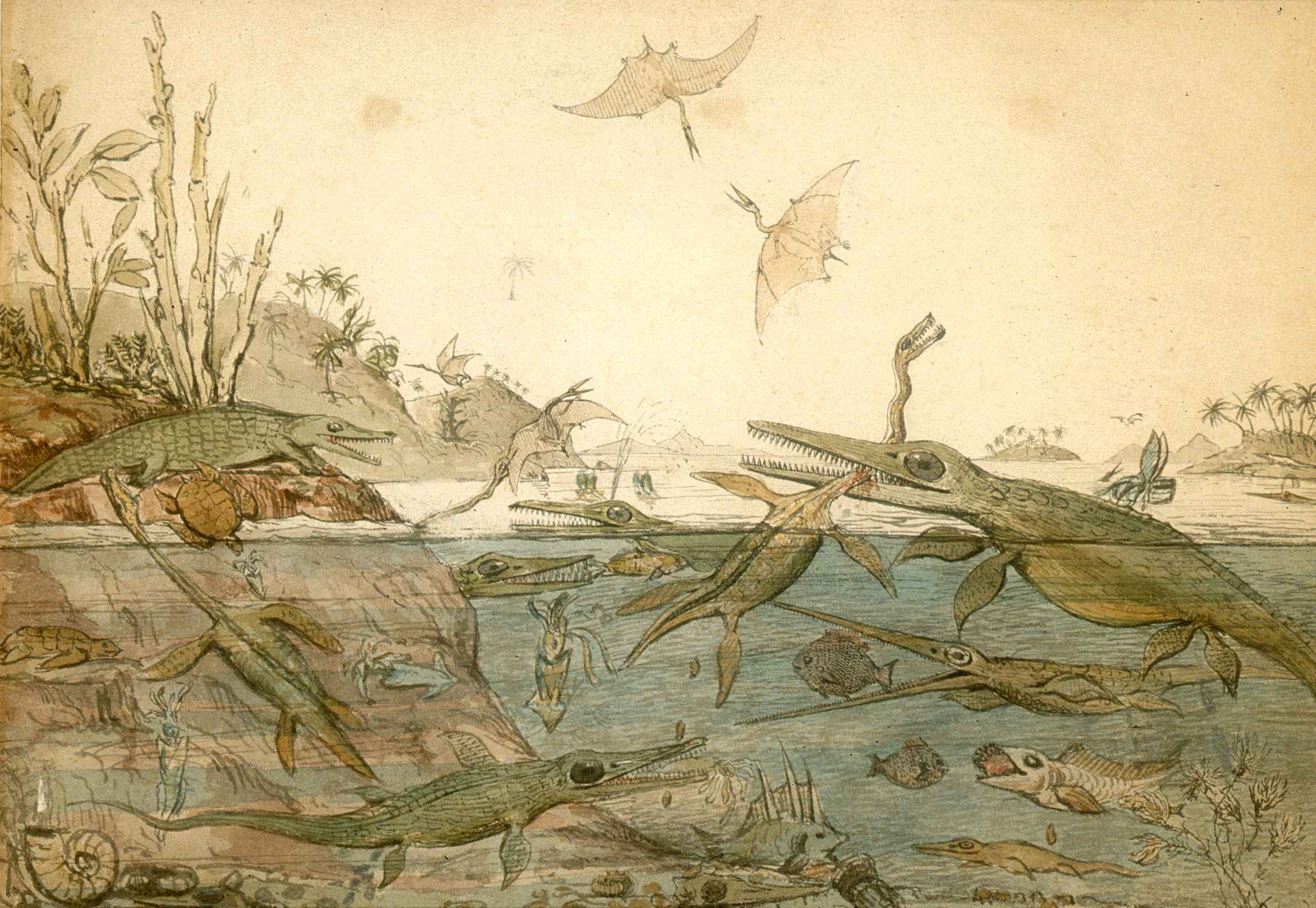
Duria Antiquior – A More Ancient Dorset is a watercolour painted in 1830 by Henry De la Beche, based on fossils found by Mary Anning

De la Beche was the principal antagonist of Roderick Murchison and Adam Sedgwick in what has been labelled The Great Devonian Controversy. He frequently used cartoons as a tactful way to express his frustrations on this and other issues.

He was elected Fellow of the Royal Society in 1819. He was knighted on 13 April 1842 and, near the close of his life he was awarded the Wollaston Medal. In 1852, he was elected a foreign member of the Royal Swedish Academy of Sciences.

After his death, students at the Royal College of Mines and other institutions competed for the bursary of the De la Beche medal. The medal was in fact the second imprint, of a medal De la Beche had originally had engraved and struck for the slaves he inherited from his father on the plantation in Jamaica on his return to Lyme Regis in 1825. The second version of the medal, in silver and bronze, was engraved by William Wyon of the Royal Mint – with De la Beche's portrait on one side, and the plantation on the other – the plantation being replaced with crossed hammers for the School of Mines.

In June 2020, the De La Beche Society, a student-run geology society at Imperial College, announced they were distancing themselves from Henry De la Beche because of his legacy as a slave owner. The society was temporarily renamed Imperial College Geology Society pending consultation on a permanent new name. The society was permanently renamed Imperial College Geology Society in September 2020 following a department-wide referendum.

He is buried in the Kensal Green Cemetery, London.

== Cartoons ==
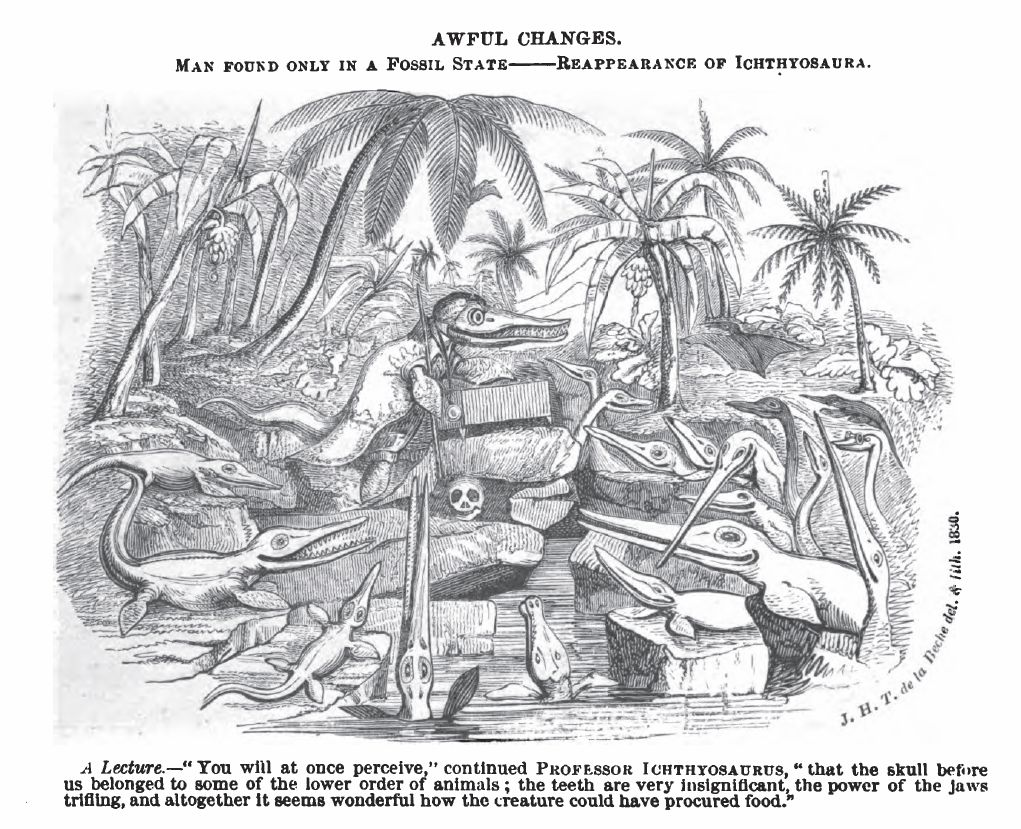
De la Beche's well-known caricature Awful Changes

A great supporter of the work and importance of Mary Anning, of Lyme Regis, Henry De la Beche drew a sketch, in 1830, entitled Duria Antiquior – A More Ancient Dorset, which showed Mary Anning's finds: (three types of Ichthyosaur, a Plesiosaur and Dimorphodon). It even appears to show the production of coprolites, from a terrified plesiosaur. De la Beche assisted Anning, who was having financial difficulties, by having a lithographic print made from his watercolour and donating the proceeds from the sale of the prints to her. This became the first such scene from deep time to be widely circulated.

He was a great and objective scientist and poked fun at some of the more outlandish theories of the time, such as that put forward by Charles Lyell, proposing that geological and biological history were cyclical and that ancient life forms would again walk the earth. His cartoon, also drawn in 1830, was entitled Awful Changes and depicted an ichthyosaur professor lecturing on a fossilised human skull: " 'You will at once perceive' continued Professor Ichthyosaurus, 'that the skull before us belonged to some of the lower order of animals; the teeth are very insignificant, the power of the jaws trifling, and altogether it seems wonderful how the creature could have procured food.'"

== Family ==
He married Letitia Whyte (1801–1844), daughter of Captain Charles Whyte of Loughbrickland, County Down, Ireland in 1817.

They set off on a year-long tour of the continent in 1819. The marriage was not a success and, in 1825, the couple split up with an acrimonious public controversy with Letitia requesting a legal separation on the grounds that "the union proved to be of the most unhappy nature: the treatment which Lady De la Beche received at the hands of her husband being such as to render it impossible for her to live with him."

De la Beche obtained a legal separation and custody of their two daughters in 1826. Letitia moved in with her lover, Major-General Henry Wyndham, son of the earl of Egremont.

Daughter Elizabeth (1819–1866), known as Bessie, married Lewis Llewelyn Dillwyn, a scientist, industrialist and long-serving Liberal MP for Swansea who campaigned for disestablishment in Wales on 16 August 1838. Elizabeth Llewellyn contributed to the designs of the Cambrian Pottery owned by her husband, particularly their Etruscan ware. They had four children, Henry (b. 1843) who became a barrister, and three daughters: Mary De la Beche Nicholl (1839–1922), an alpinist and lepidopterist; Amy Dillwyn (1845–1935), a novelist and industrialist; and Sarah, known as Essie (b. 1852), who became an actress after a divorce.

Elizabeth was the primary legatee in her father's will but he also provided for £3750 in trust for a daughter called Rosalie Torre, born near Taunton in 1834, and £1250 in trust for "my trusty servant" Elizabeth Kendall who was living as a companion with De La Beche and Rosalie at 3 Blandford Place London in 1851.

== Honours ==
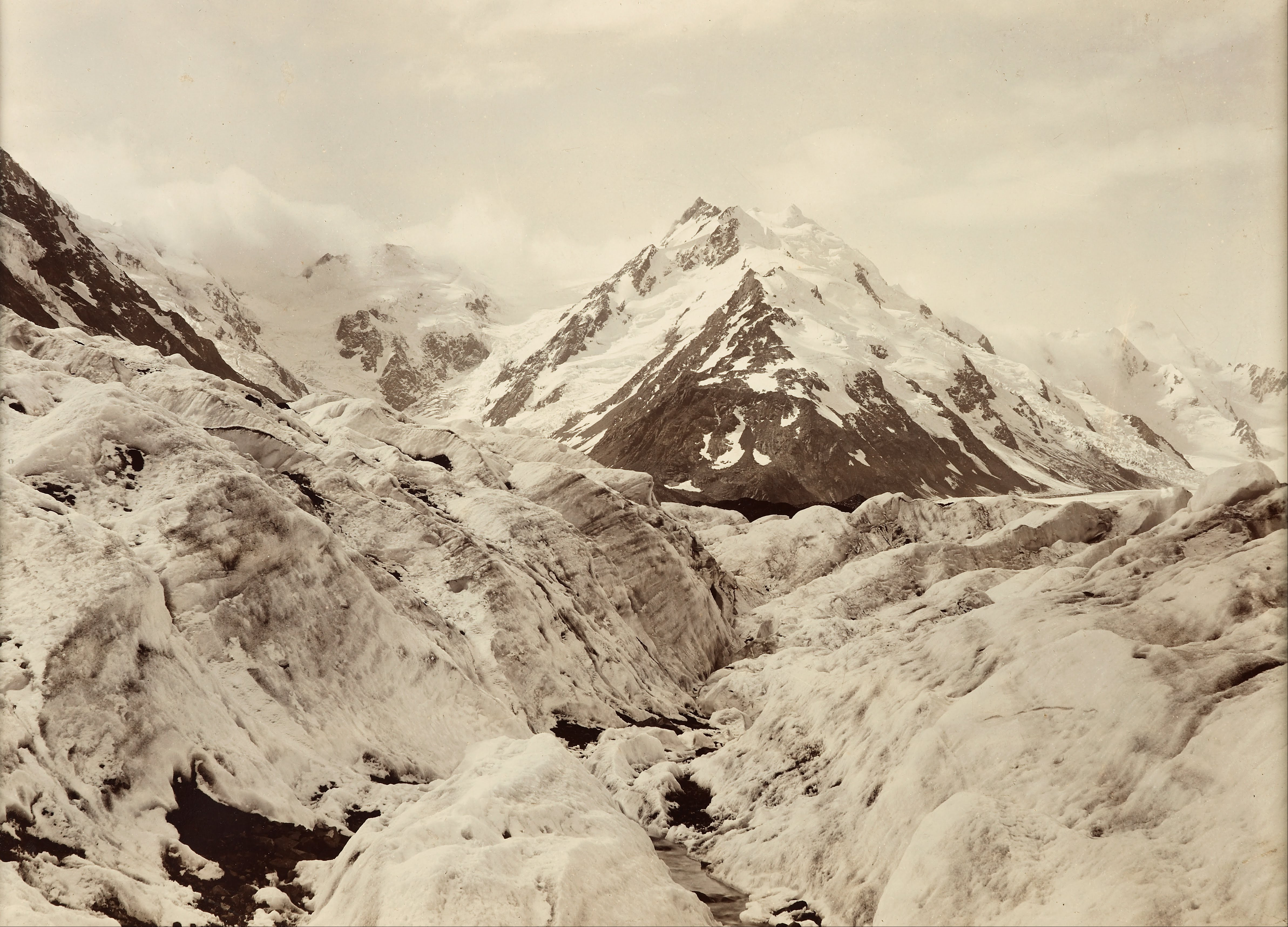
Mount De La Beche from the Tasman Glacier

The following geographic features are named after De la Beche:

- Mount De La Beche in New Zealand
- De la Beche Bay in Nunavut

== See also ==
- Vallis Vale
