= De la Beche Bay =

Bay in Nunavut, Canada

- Location within Nunavut
- Location: Viscount Melville Sound
- Coordinates: 75°15′50″N 100°24′00″W
- Basin countries: Canada
- Settlements: Uninhabited

De la Beche Bay is an Arctic waterway in the Qikiqtaaluk Region, Nunavut, Canada. Located off southern Bathurst Island, the bay is an arm of Viscount Melville Sound. It is entered at Harding Point.

It was named in honour of English geologist Sir Henry De la Beche.
