= Pool of Bethesda =

Pool in Jerusalem

- בריכות בית חסדא (Hebrew) بركة بيت حسدا (Arabic)
- Bethzatha, Bethesda, Bezatha
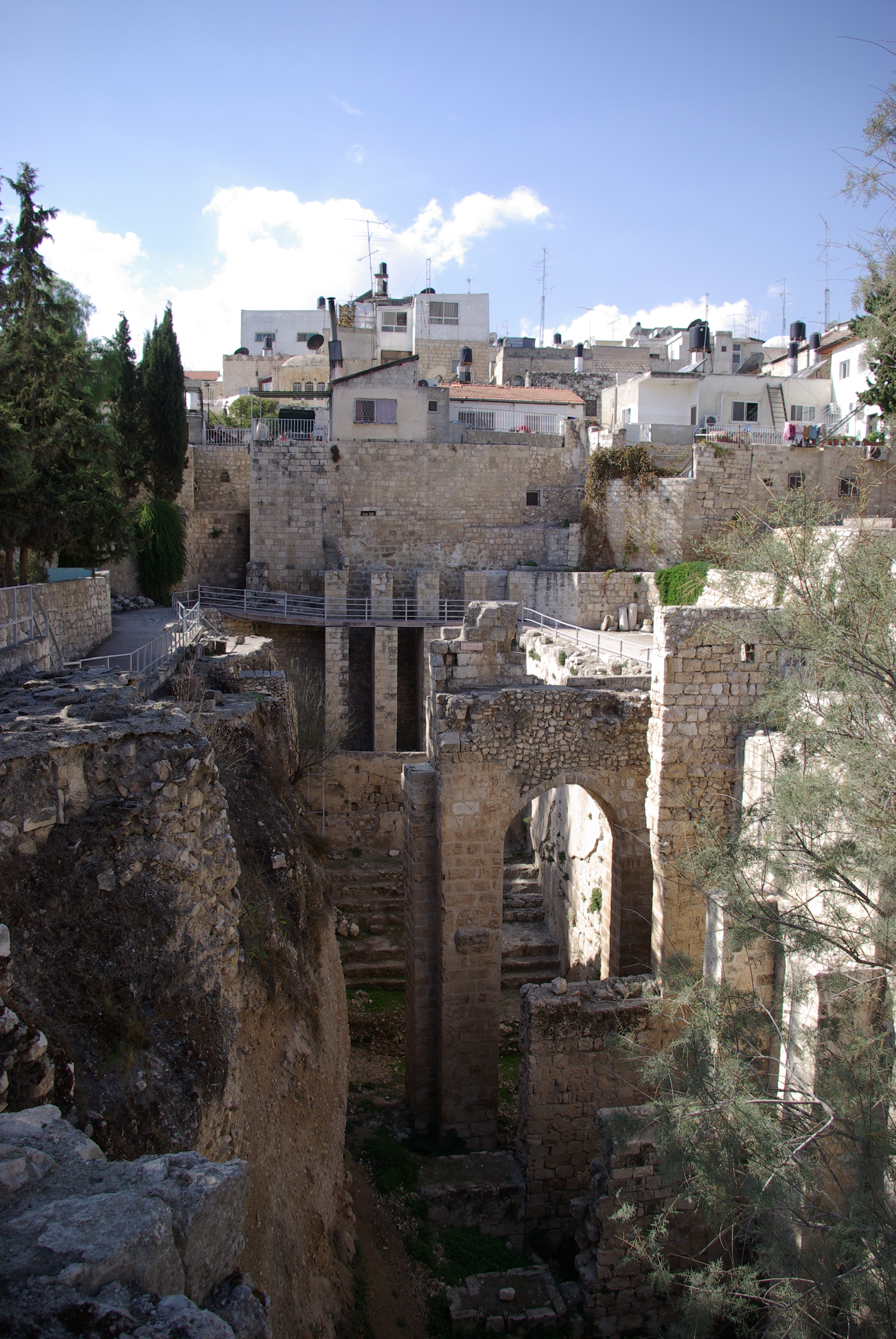
- The ruins of the Byzantine Church, adjacent to the site of the Pool of Bethesda

- Location within Old City of Jerusalem
- 31°46′53″N 35°14′09″E
- Type: Public bathing pool
- Location: Old City of Jerusalem

History
- Built: Possibly 8th century BC, expanded 200 BC, Byzantine and Crusader modifications

Site notes
- Public access: Yes

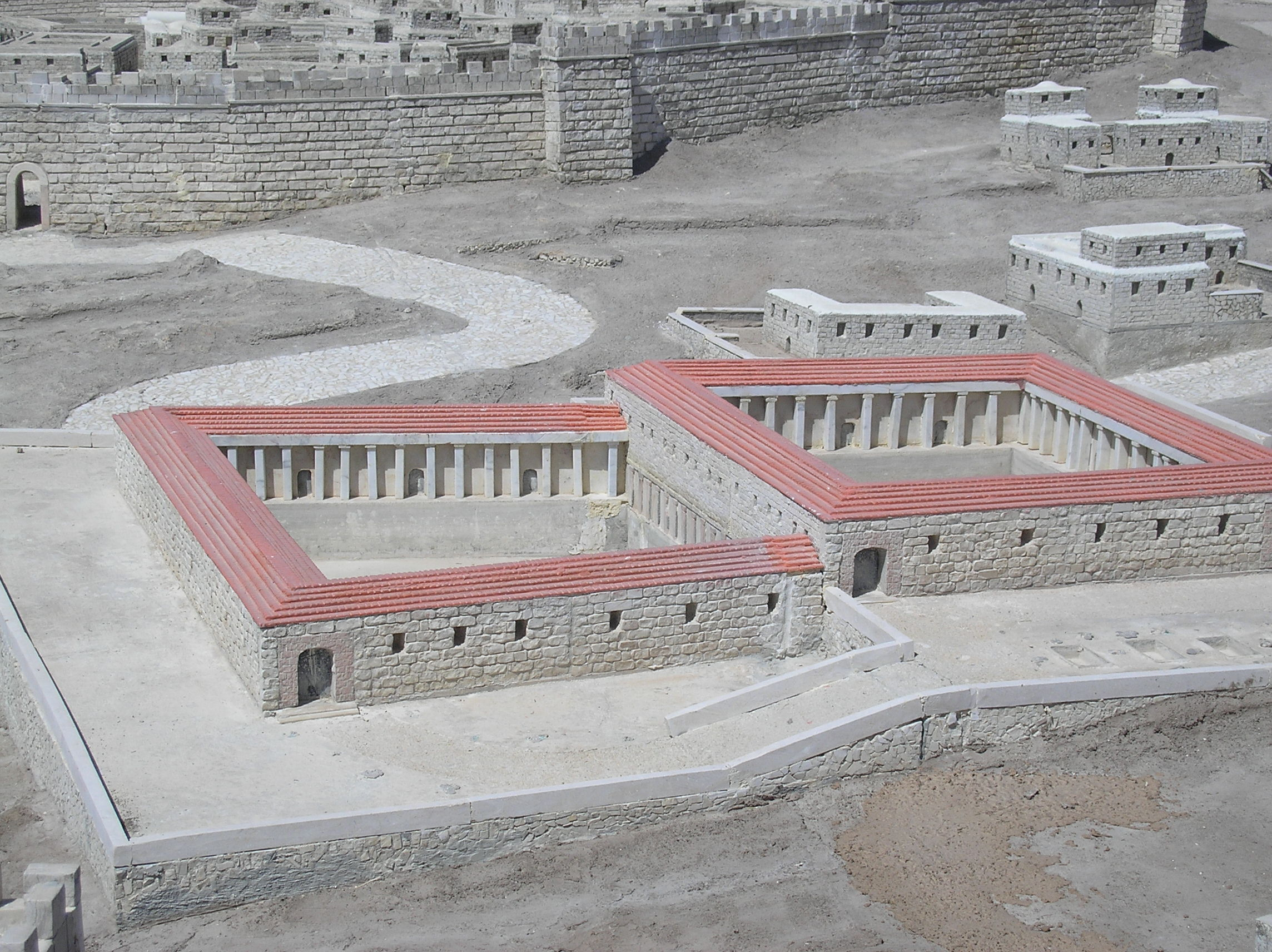
Model of the pools during the Second Temple Period (Israel Museum)

The Pool of Bethesda is referred to in John's Gospel in the Christian New Testament, (John 5:2) in an account of Jesus healing a paralyzed man at a pool of water in Jerusalem, described as being near the Sheep Gate and surrounded by five covered colonnades or porticoes. It is also referred to as Bethzatha. It is now associated with the site of a pool in the current Muslim Quarter of the city, near the gate now called the Lions' Gate or St. Stephen's Gate and the Church of St. Anne, which was excavated in the late 19th century.

== Name ==
The name of the pool is said to be derived from the Hebrew and/or Aramaic language. Beth hesda (בית חסד/חסדא), means either "house of mercy" or "house of grace". This meaning may have been thought appropriate, since the location was seen as a place of disgrace due to the presence of invalids, and as a place of grace due to the granting of healing.

Alternative renderings to the name Βηθεσδά (Bethesda), appearing in manuscripts of the Gospel of John, include Βηθζαθά (Beth-zatha = בית חדתא), a derivative of Bezetha, and Bethsaida (not to be confused with Bethsaida, a town in Galilee), although the latter is considered to be a metathetical corruption by Biblical scholars.

Franz Delitzsch suggested that the name comes from a mishnaic Hebrew loanword from Greek, estiv/estava, that appropriately referred to stoa (στοά).

== Identification of the biblical site ==
According to the Gospel of John, Bethesda was a bathing pool (Greek: κολυμβήθρα, kolumbethra) with five porticoes (translated as porches by older English Bible translations).

Until the 19th century, there was no clear archaeological evidence for the existence of such a pool. The Pool of Bethesda was sometimes identified by commentators with the modern so-called Fountain of the Virgin, in the Kidron Valley, not far from the Pool of Siloam, or alternatively with the Birket Isrâ'il, a pool near the mouth of the valley, which runs into the Kidron south of St. Stephen's Gate. Others identified it with the twin pools then called the Souterrains (French for "subterranean"), under the Convent of the Sisters of Zion; subsequent archaeological investigation has identified these with the later Struthion Pool.

However, as early as the fifth century, there was a Byzantine church in what became the precincts of the Church of St. Anne, called the Church of the Probatike (the Church at the Probatic Pool, or the Pool of the Sheep) or the Church of the Lame Man. This site, as subsequently excavated by archaeologists, seems plausibly to fit the description in John's Gospel.

=== Archaeology ===
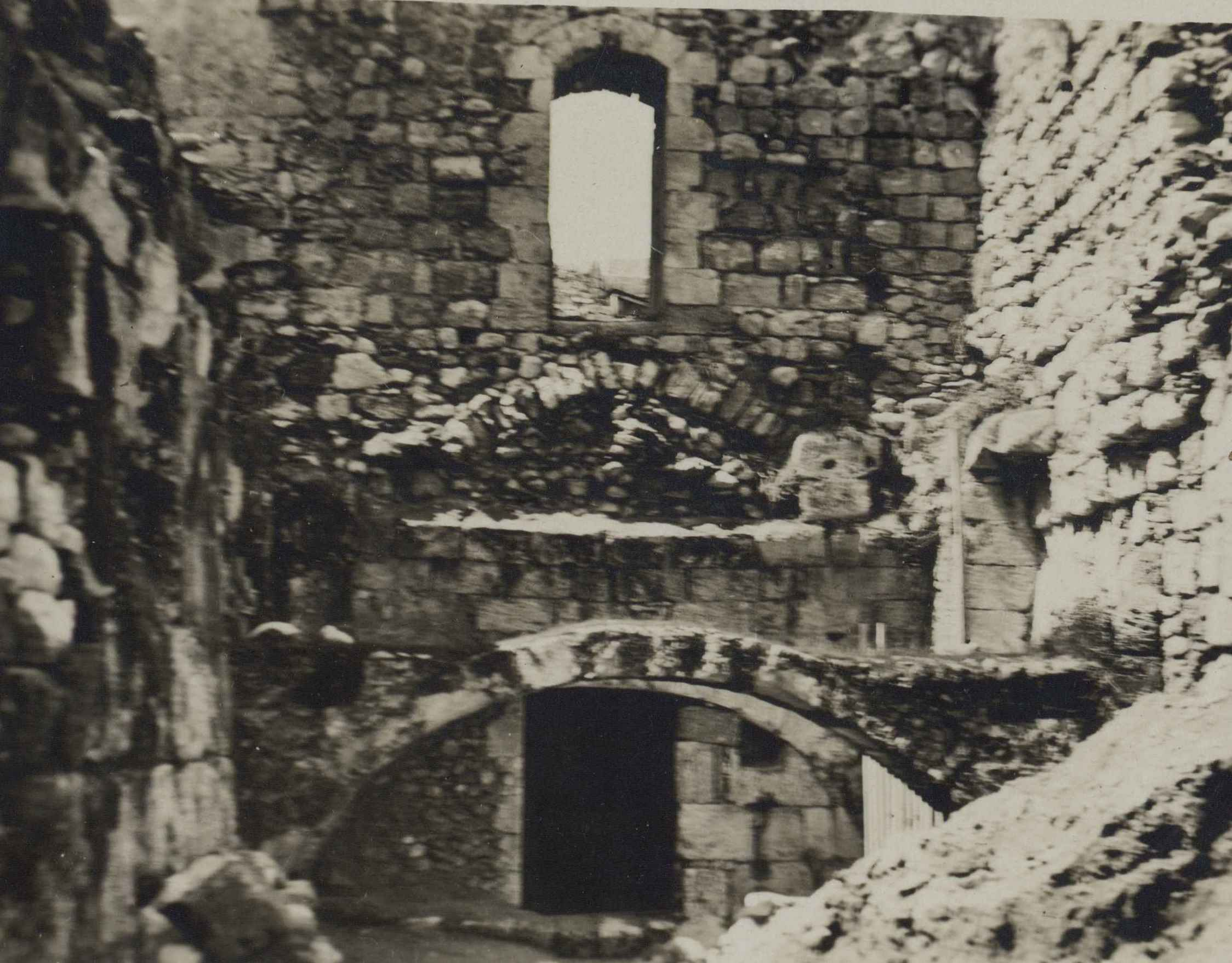
The pool of Bethesda in 1911

In archaeological digs conducted in the 19th century, Conrad Schick discovered a large tank situated about 100 feet (30 m) north-west of St. Anne's Church, which he contended was the Pool of Bethesda. Further archaeological excavation in the area, in 1964, uncovered the remains of the Byzantine and Crusader churches, Hadrian's Temple of Asclepius and Serapis, the small healing pools of an Asclepeion, the second of the two large pools, and the dam between them. It was discovered that the Byzantine church had been built in the very heart of Hadrian's temple and contained the healing pools.

=== Gospel account ===
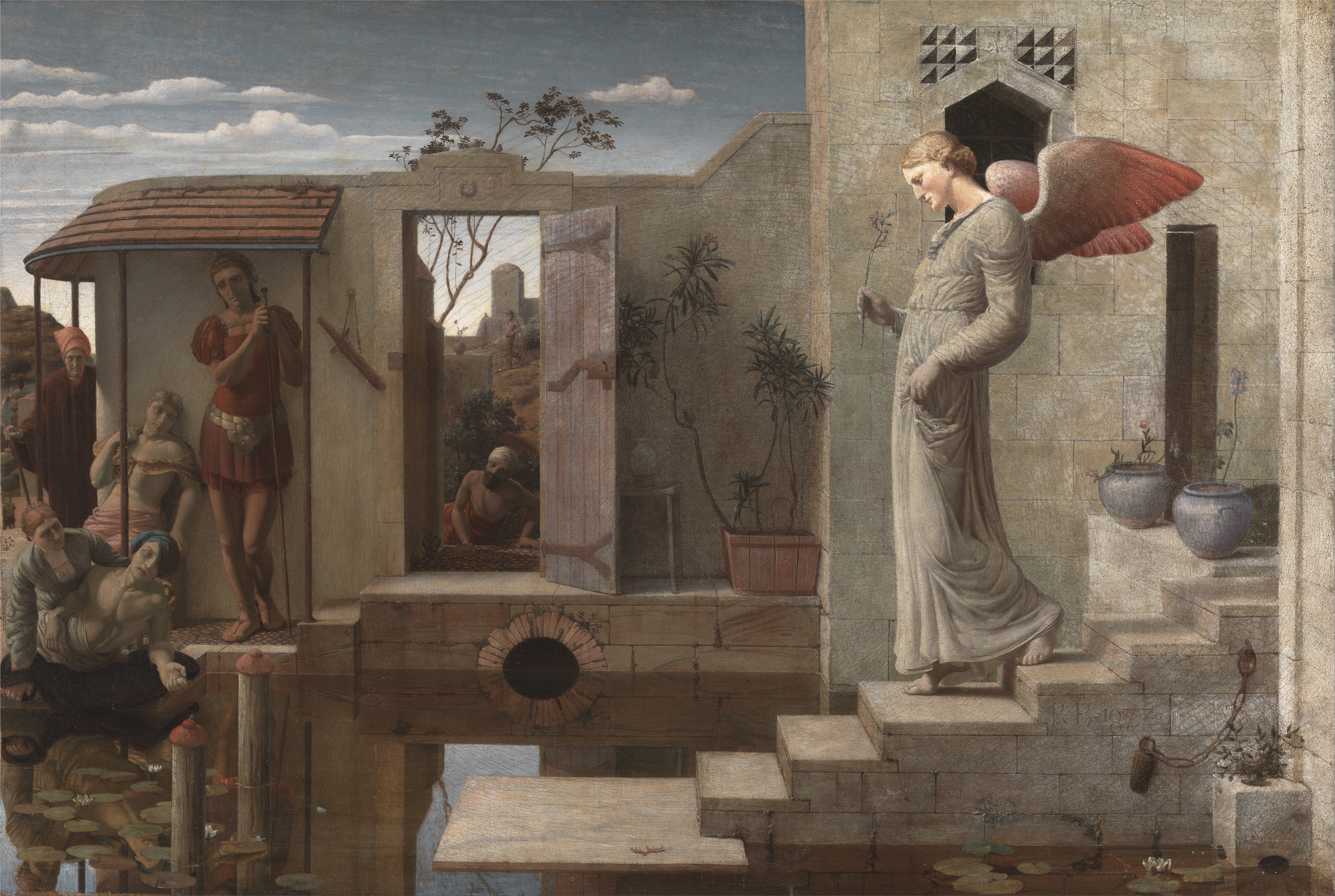
The Pool of Bethesda painting by Robert Bateman (1877)

The Johannine text (chapter 5) describes the porticoes as being a place in which large numbers of infirm people were waiting, which could correspond with the site's possible use in the 1st century AD as an Asclepeion. The biblical narrative continues by describing a Shabbat visit to the site by Jesus, during which he heals a man who has been bedridden for 38 years and could not make his own way into the pool. The healing, and Jesus' instruction to the man to take up his mat, prompts a protest that the religious customs of the Sabbath have been broken.

== History ==
=== First (northern) pool ===
The history of the pool began in the 8th century BC, when a dam was built across the short Beth Zeta Valley, turning it into a reservoir for rain water; a sluice-gate in the dam allowed the height to be controlled, and a rock-cut channel brought a steady stream of water from the reservoir into the city. The reservoir became known as the Upper Pool (בריכה העליונה).

=== Second (southern) pool ===
Around 200 BC, during the period in which Simon II was the Jewish High Priest, the channel was enclosed, and a second pool was added on the south side of the dam.

Although popular legend argues that this pool was used for washing sheep, this is very unlikely due to the pool's use as a water supply, and its extreme depth 13 metres (43 ft). There has been some scholarly debate about whether the pool may have been a mikveh (Jewish ritual bathing pool).

=== Hellenistic and Roman temples ===
According to Jerome Murphy-O'Connor in the 1st century BC natural caves to the east of the two pools were turned into small baths with a religious/medical function. At least one of these new pools was sacred to Fortuna, the Roman goddess of fortune, rather than Asclepius, the Greek god of healing. Murphy-O'Connor thinks it likely that this development was founded by the Roman garrison of the nearby Antonia Fortress, who would also have been able to protect it from attack. Additionally, the location of the baths outside the then city walls would have made its presence tolerable to the Jews, who might otherwise have objected to a non-Jewish religious presence in their holy city.

In the mid 1st century AD, Herod Agrippa expanded the city walls, bringing the baths into the city. When Hadrian rebuilt Jerusalem as Aelia Capitolina, he placed a roadway along the dam, and expanded the site into a large temple to Asclepius and Serapis.

=== Byzantine church ===
By the fifth century, at least part of the asclepieion had been converted into, or replaced by, a Byzantine church, known as the Church of the Probatike (literally, the Church of the Sheep, the pool being called the Probatic or Sheep Pool) and initially dedicated to the Healing of the Paralytic, though from the sixth century associated with the Virgin Mary (the German pilgrim Theodosius wrote in De Situ Terrae Sanctae (c. 530) that "next to the Sheep-pool is the church of my Lady Mary"). This reflects a more general movement which appropriated the healing sites of pagan religion and rededicated them to the Virgin Mary. The theory that this church was built by the Empress Eudocia (present in Jerusalem in 438–439 and 443–460) is uncertain. It seems more likely to be associated with Juvenal, bishop of Jerusalem in the mid 5th century. This church was destroyed in 614 by the Persians.

=== Crusader churches ===
After the Crusader conquest of Jerusalem in 1099, a much smaller church was built among the Byzantine-period ruins on the stone dyke separating the two pools, known as the Church of the Paralytic or the Moustier ('the Monastery'). It was followed by a larger new church erected nearby. This larger church, completed in 1138, was built over the site of a grotto which had (from the fifth or sixth century onwards) been traditionally believed to be the birthplace of Mary, mother of Jesus and was named for Mary's mother, Saint Anne. After the conquest of Jerusalem by Saladin in 1187, it was transformed into a Shafi`i fiqh (Islamic law school). Gradually the buildings fell into ruin, becoming a midden (waste dump).

=== Modern times ===
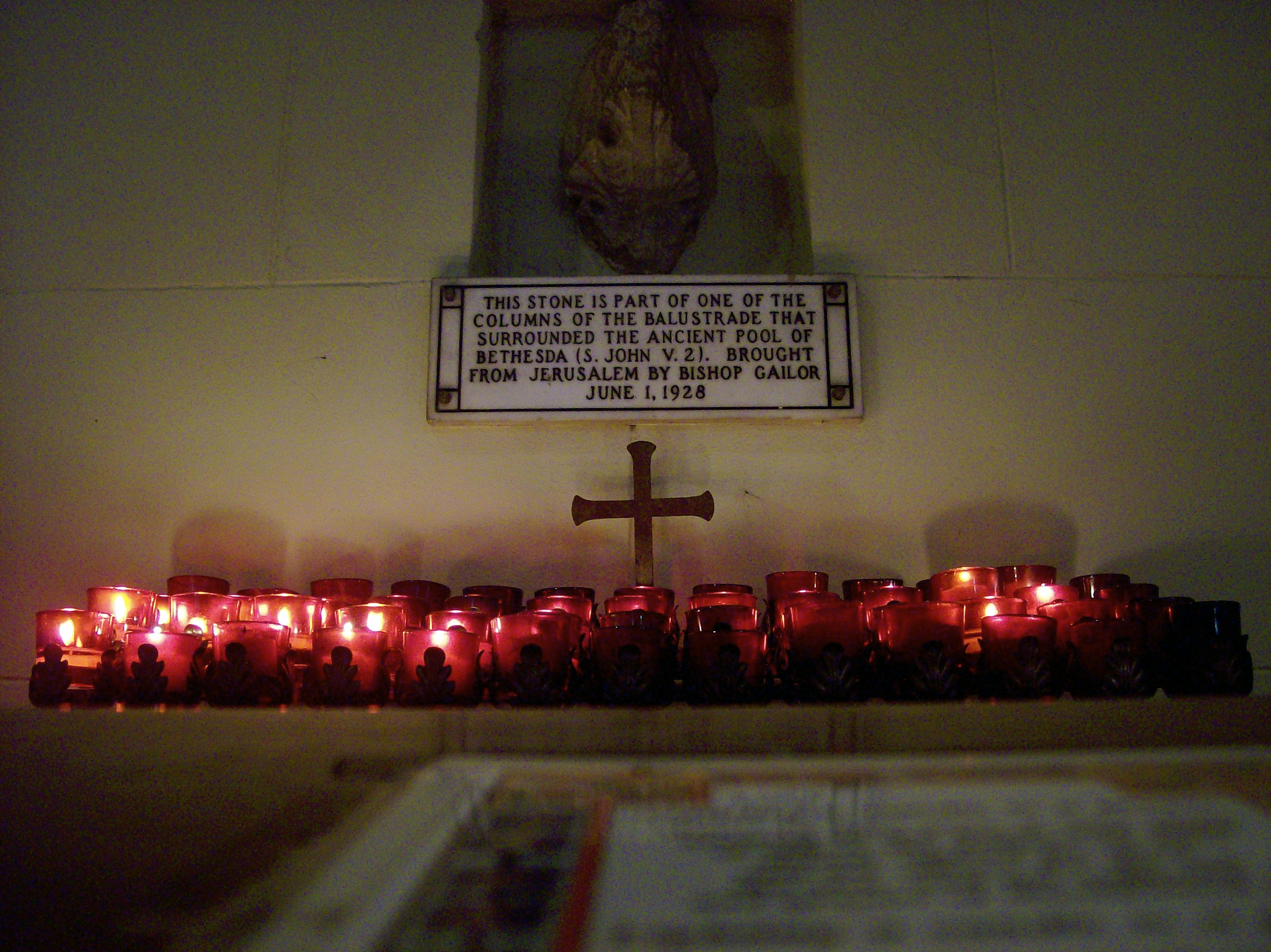
Capital segment from the portico that surrounded the pool, now at St. Mary's Episcopal Cathedral in Memphis, USA

In 1856, the area including the Church of St. Anne and the pool site was presented by the Ottoman Sultan Abdülmecid I to Napoleon III of France. The French renovated and rededicated the church (under the administration of the White Fathers), at the southeast corner of the pools, leaving the other ruins untouched. There is a tale that the site was originally offered to Queen Victoria as part of the negotiations which led ultimately to the Cyprus Convention of 1878.

== In fiction ==
The Pool of Bethesda features in Glorious Appearing, the penultimate book in the bestselling Left Behind Christian fiction series. It appears as "a legendary healing pool" with miraculous properties for believers holding out in Jerusalem against overwhelming invaders, with a prominent supporting Jewish character Tsion Ben-Judah being rushed to the Pool, but succumbing to his severe wounds just before making it there.

In the 2024 Indie Roguelike Video Game, Caves of Qud, many biblical references are used to add artistic flavor as well as convey parts of the game’s deeper themes. One zone that the player may visit (particularly while following the main storyline) is Bethesda Susa, an ancient, dilapidated hospital filled with pools of healing liquid.

== See also ==
- Isaiah 7
- Pool of Siloam
