= Bab al-Asbat Minaret =

Minaret of the Temple Mount in Jerusalem

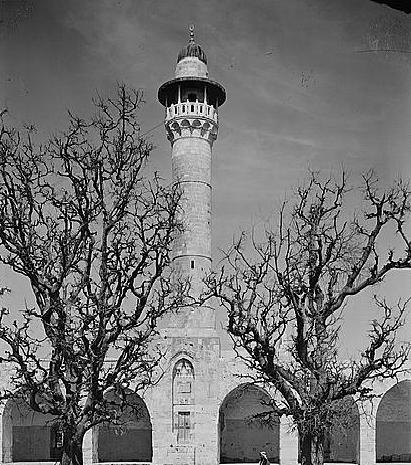
Bab Al-Asbat Minaret

Bab Al-Asbat Minaret (Arabic: منارة الأسباط, romanized: Minarat al-Asbat), Minaret of the Tribes, is a minaret in Jerusalem. The other name is the Minaret of Salahiyah which refers to the Salahiyah School close to it. It is one of the four minarets of Al-Aqsa, and is situated along the north wall.

== History ==
Bab al-Asbat was built in the Mamluk period during the reign of Sultan al-Malik Ashraf Shaaban, the son of Sultan Hasan, in 769 AH/1367 AD at the hands of Prince Sayf Al-Din Qutlu Bagha, the governor of Jerusalem and the inspector of the two Harams (Haramayn) in 769 AH/1367 AD.

== Architecture ==
After the damaging construction caused by an earthquake in 1586 AD, the Ottomans rebuilt the Al-Asbat minaret in a cylindrical shape of 28.5 m long, which is the Ottoman style. This work was carried out by Sultan Mahmud, the son of Sultan Muhammad in 1007 H / 1599 AD. The Sultan allocated 300 Sultani dinars for that purpose under the supervision of Abd al-Baqi Bek, the inspector of the two Harams and Ahmad Bek, the governor of Jerusalem and Gaza, and with the involvement of the engineer Mahmud, the son of the Mu'allim Abd al-Muhsin ibn Nummar, Khalaf al- Mi'mar, and the Mu'allim Ali ibn Khalil. It is composed of a cylindrical stone shaft (of Ottoman construction), rising from a rectangular base on top of a triangular transition zone. The shaft narrows above the muezzin's balcony, and is dotted with circular windows, ending with a bulbous dome.

In 1346 AH / 1927 AD, an earthquake crushed the minaret. Moreover, The Supreme Islamic Council rebuilt it in the same year by increasing the length of the minaret as written in the inscription above its door.

The dome was reconstructed after the 1927 Jericho earthquake. The following reconstruction occurred after the Arab-Israeli war in 1387 AH / 1967 AD when the Zionist targeted the minaret by bombing, causing severe damage and requiring a comprehensive restoration of The al-Asbat Minaret. It was built when most of the minaret was damaged due to the hit and the cone was covered with lead.

== See also ==
- Gate of the Tribes of Israel
- Birket Israel (Pool of Israel)
- Islam in Jerusalem

== Bibliography ==
- Burgoyne, Michael Hamilton (1987). Mamluk Jerusalem. British School of Archaeology in Jerusalem by the World of Islam Festival Trust. ISBN 090503533X. (pp. 415−418)
- Berchem, van, Max (1920). MIFAO 45.2 Matériaux pour un Corpus Inscriptionum Arabicarum Part 2 Syrie du Sud T.3 Fasc. 2 Jérusalem Index général. Cairo: Impr. de l'Institut français d'archéologie orientale.(LXXI)
- Berchem, van, M. (1922). MIFAO 43 Matériaux pour un Corpus Inscriptionum Arabicarum Part 2 Syrie du Sud T.1 Jérusalem "Ville" (in French and Arabic). Cairo: Impr. de l'Institut français d'archéologie orientale. (pp. 403-411)
- Berchem, van, M. (1927). MIFAO 44 Matériaux pour un Corpus Inscriptionum Arabicarum Part 2 Syrie du Sud T.2 Jérusalem Haram. Cairo: Impr. de l'Institut français d'archéologie orientale. (pp. 133−136)
