= Great Devonian Controversy =

Geological dating dispute of plants

The Great Devonian Controversy began in 1834 when Roderick Murchison disagreed with Henry De la Beche as to the dating of certain petrified plants found in coals in the Greywacke stratum in North Devon, England. De La Beche was claiming that since Carboniferous fossils were found deep in the Greywacke stratum, which itself was older than the Carboniferous period, this method of dating rocks was not valid. Murchison, in contrast, claimed that De La Beche had not placed the fossils correctly, as they were occurring quite near the top of the stratum as opposed to deep within it. De La Beche soon agreed with Murchison's argument as to the placing of fossils but maintained that since a layer of Old Red Sandstone, present in other formations, was missing between the layer of older rock and this new formation, there was still insufficient evidence to suggest the formation was not part of the older Silurian strata.

There followed much debate and some extensive investigations which ranged as far as Russia, where in 1840 Murchison discovered a layer similar to the one found in Devon placed between well-defined Silurian and Carboniferous deposits. This discovery put an end to the controversy and led to the definition of a new period called Devonian.
