= Birket Israel =

Reservoir in the Old City of Jerusalem

- بئر إسرائيل (Arabic)
- Pool of Israel, Birket Israil, Birket Isra'in
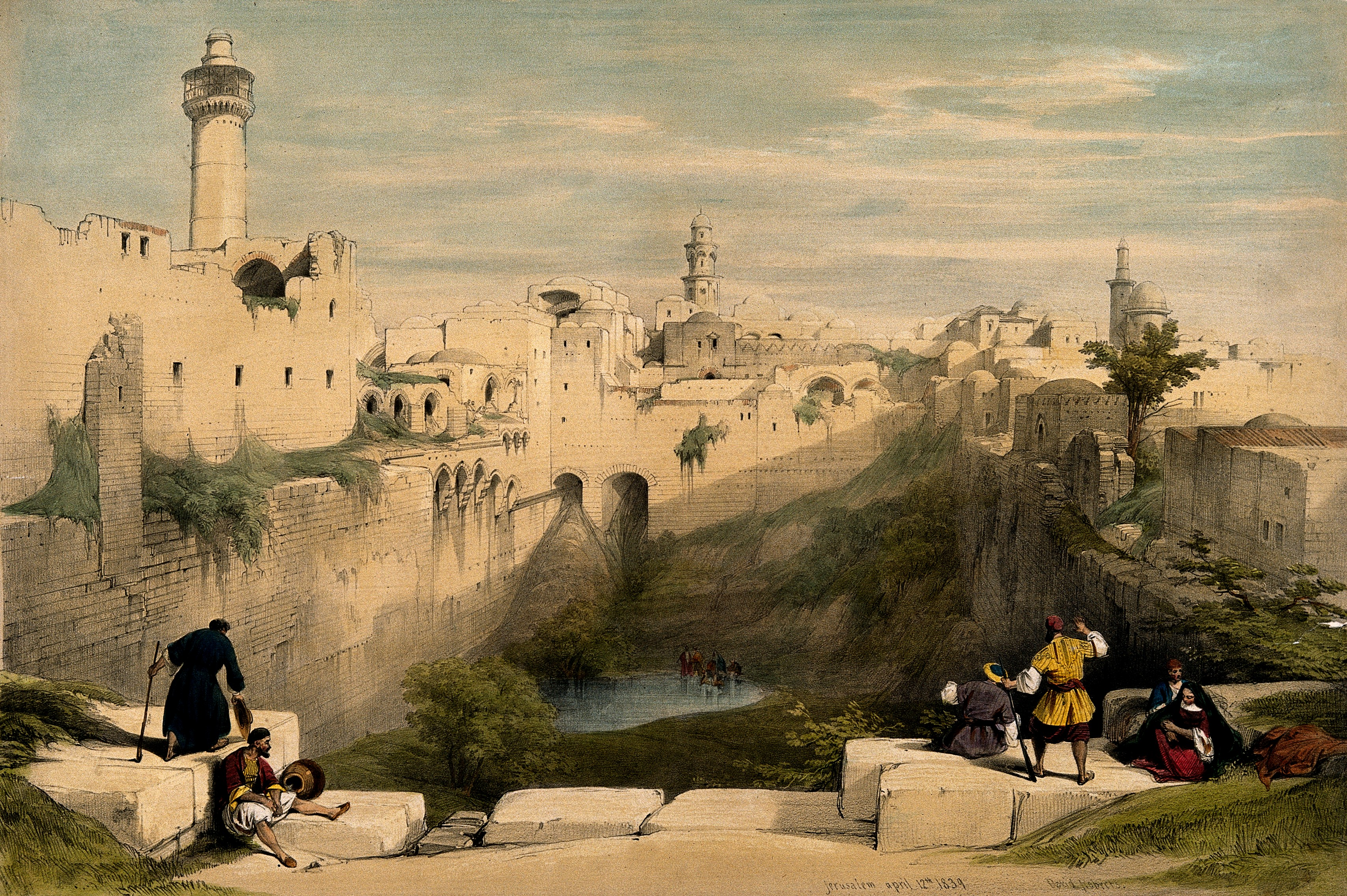
- Birket Israel

- Location within Old City of Jerusalem
- 31.7804°N 35.2362°E
- Type: Public cistern
- Location: Old City of Jerusalem

History
- Built: Late Roman or Umayyad period
- Built by: Ezekiel or Hezekiah (According to Muslim tradition)
- Abandoned: 1934

Site notes
- Material: Stone, Roman concrete, cement
- Height: 26 m (85 ft)
- Length: 109.7 m (360 ft)
- Width: 38.4 m (126 ft)
- Area: 0.31 ha (0.77 acres)
- Public access: Yes

Birket Israel (trans. Pool of Israel) also Birket Israil or Birket Isra'in, abbreviated from Birket Beni Israìl (trans. Pool of the Children of Israel) was a public cistern located on the north-eastern corner of the Temple Mount, in Jerusalem. The structure is believed to have been built either in the Late Roman or the Umayyad period for use as a water reservoir and also to protect the northern wall of the Temple Mount. Hackett attests that Arab locals knew it by this name in 1857.

By the mid-19th century it had gone out of use as a reservoir; being partly filled with rubbish and reused as a vegetable garden. In 1934 it was filled in and is now known as el-Ghazali Square. It is currently in mixed use for shops, as a car park, and as a transshipment point for refuse.

== Construction ==
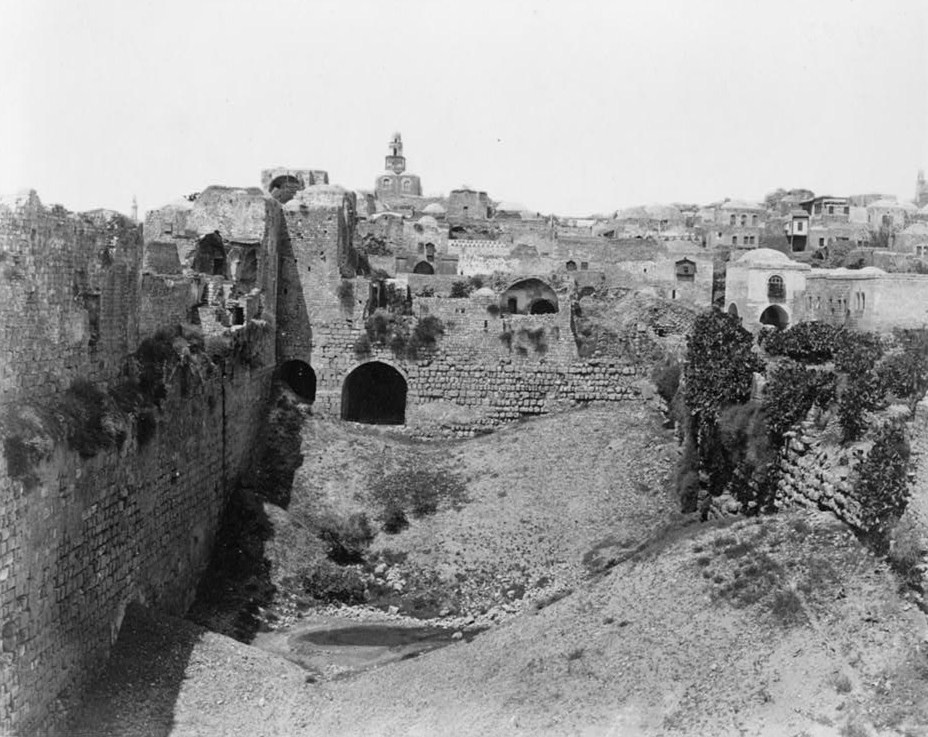
Birket Israel, dried up, in the late 19th century

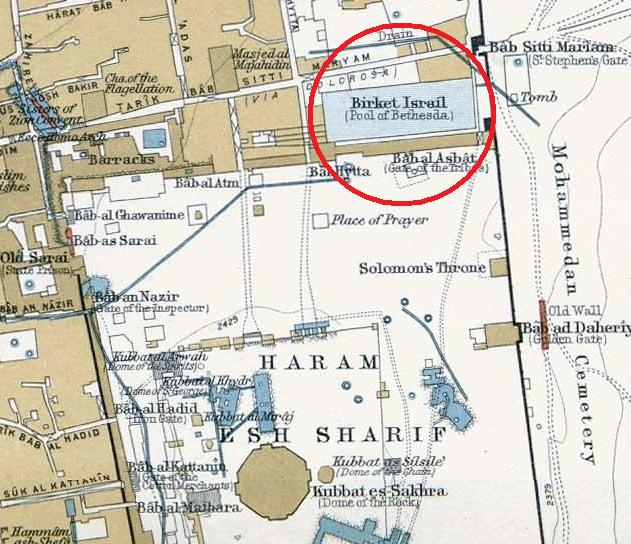
Birket Israel, circled, on a 1915 map

=== Date ===
According to Muslim tradition, the reservoir was constructed by Ezekiel or Hezekiah, King of Judah. Some archaeologists have determined that the cistern was possibly built during the Herodian period to improve Jerusalem's water supply. Others estimate the date of construction later, in around 130 CE. This view is held by Charles Warren who recorded that although some kind of fosse must have existed at the spot at a very early period, since there is no description of the pool in the works of Josephus, "and it is very improbable that he would have omitted to mention so enormous a reservoir had it existed in his time", it was most probably constructed by Roman emperor Hadrian during his restoration of Jerusalem. This is further attested to since the masonry of the birket is inferior in character and resembles the later Roman work in Syria. Additionally, this reservoir appears to be mentioned by the Bordeaux Pilgrim (section 4) as already existing, and "would therefore most naturally be referable to Hadrian." Apart from such speculation or the discovery of a Byzantine-style cross carved into the outlet channel, the first explicit mention of the pool only dates to the 10th-century historian al-Muqaddasi. Shimon Gibson, who has worked in the nearby area of the Bethesda Pool, suggests that the Birkat was built by the Umayyads during their large construction campaign on the Haram al-Sharif.

=== Description ===
Birket Isra'il was constructed in the bed of the western fork of the Kidron Valley that traverses the north-west quarter of the city. It formed Jerusalem's largest reservoir, measuring 109.7 m (360 ft) by 38.4 m (126 ft) with a maximum depth of 26 m (85 ft). The cistern contained a total capacity of 120,000 cubic meters and for centuries it formed part of Jerusalem's rainwater storage system. The pool also served as a moat, protecting the northern wall of the Temple Mount.

The eastern and western ends of the pool were partially rock-cut and partly masonry. The masonry at the eastern end formed a great dam 13.7 m (45 ft) thick, the lower part of which was continuous with an ancient eastern wall of the Temple compound. The sides of the pool were lined entirely with masonry because it was built across the width of a valley. The original bottom of the reservoir was covered with a layer of about 19 inches of very hard Roman concrete and cement. There was a great conduit at the eastern end of the pool built of massive stones, and connected with the pool by a perforated stone with three round holes 5½ inches in diameter. The position of this outlet shows that all water over a depth of 6.5 m (21 ft) must have flowed away.

== Misidentification as the "Pool of Bethesda" ==
The Birket Israel cistern was frequented by Christian pilgrims during the 19th century, it being previously identified as the "Sheep Pool" or Pool of Bethesda of John 5:2; a double-pool with five porches, where the sick came to be cured. This link was based on the premise that the nearby St. Stephen's Gate occupied the site of the Sheep Gate mentioned in the New Testament. It was reinforced by the co-location of the names 'Birket Israel' and the 'Pool of Bethesda' on maps and plans of Jerusalem; and in drawings and paintings, such as those made by David Roberts in 1893.

According to Kopp, the Pool of Bethesda became associated with a Byzantine church by 450 CE; then a 6th-century church, which by the arrival of the Crusaders in 1099, was known as the "Church of St. Anne". A new Church of St. Anne was built in the 12th century CE; the pool fell into disuse after the fall of the Kingdom of Jerusalem, while the church was converted into a madrasah, Christian pilgrims being redirected to nearby Birket Israel on the other side of what is now called the Lions Gate Street, whose more western section is part of the Via Dolorosa. Ownership of the whole site of the Church of St. Anne passed to France after the Crimean War, in 1856; and discoveries made in around 1870 led to the belief that the real Pool of Bethesda was actually located in the grounds of the Church of St. Anne.

== Later uses ==
By the mid-19th century, Birket Israel was no longer being used as a reservoir; and towards the end of the 19th century it was being rapidly filled with refuse and part of it was being used as a vegetable garden. In 1934 the pool was filled in because its condition posed a threat to public health.

Being located just inside the Lions' Gate, one of the major entries to the Old City, the East Jerusalem Development Company initially intended to excavate the reservoir and build a multi-storey car park at the site. This post-1967 plan was rejected by the waqf authorities who own the plot because they feared that clearance work at the base of the Temple Mount would endanger the Haram compound. Subsequently, in 1981 a small square equipped with benches was constructed on part of the covered pool.

Today the area is known as el-Ghazali Square and is used as a car park and collection point for refuse before it is dumped outside the city. Some small shops also exist at the site.

== See also ==
- Pool of Siloam

== Bibliography ==
- Finkelstein, Louis; Horbury, William; Davies, William David; Sturdy, John. The Cambridge History of Judaism, Cambridge University Press, 1999. ISBN 0-521-24377-7
- Hackett, Horatio Balch (1857). Illustrations of Scripture: Suggested by a Tour Through the Holy Land, Heath & Graves, 1857.
- Hanauer, J.E. Folk-lore of the Holy Land, BiblioBazaar, 2008. ISBN 0-554-29711-6
- Kopp, Clemens [1962](1963). The Holy Places of the Gospels. Freiburg: Herder, Edinburgh and London: Nelson. Originally published in 1962 as Die Heiligen Statten der Evangelien (in German).
- Safdie, Moshe; Barton, Rudy & Shetrit, Uri. The Harvard Jerusalem Studio, MIT Press, 1986. ISBN 0-262-19247-0
- Paton, Lewis Bayles. Jerusalem in Bible Times, Ayer Publishing, 1977. ISBN 0-405-10277-1
- Wallace, Edwin Sherman. Jerusalem the Holy, Ayer Publishing, 1977. ISBN 0-405-10298-4
