= De La Beche (New Zealand) =

Mountain in New Zealand

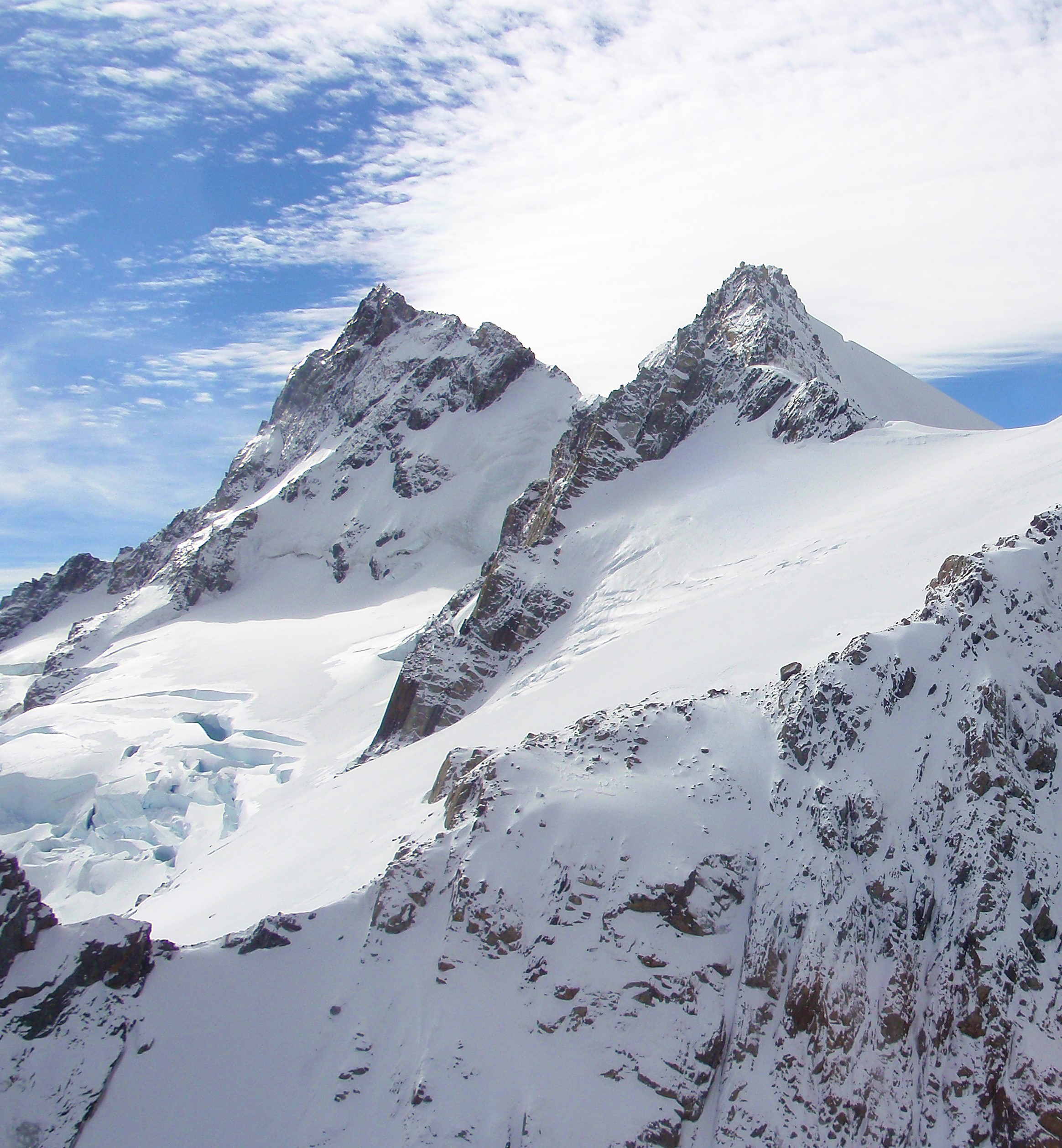
- Southwest aspect, summit to left

Highest point
- Elevation: 2,950 m (9,678 ft)
- Prominence: 40 m (131 ft)
- Isolation: 0.3 km (0.19 mi)
- Listing: Highest mountains of New Zealand
- Coordinates: 43.512029°S 170.266957°E

Naming
- Etymology: Henry De la Beche

Geography
- Location within New Zealand
- Interactive map of De La Beche
- Location: South Island
- Country: New Zealand
- Region: Canterbury / West Coast
- Protected area: Aoraki / Mount Cook National Park; Westland Tai Poutini National Park
- Parent range: Southern Alps
- Topo map(s): NZMS260 H34; Topo50 BX16

Climbing
- First ascent: 1894

De La Beche, also known as Mount De la Bêche, is a 2,950-metre-elevation (9,678-foot) mountain in New Zealand.

== Description ==
De La Beche is set on the crest or Main Divide of the Southern Alps and is situated on the boundary shared by the West Coast and Canterbury Regions of South Island. This peak is located 13 kilometres (8.1 mi) northeast of Aoraki / Mount Cook and set on the boundary shared by Aoraki / Mount Cook National Park and Westland Tai Poutini National Park. Precipitation runoff from the mountain drains north to the Waiho River and south to the Tasman River. Topographic relief is significant as the summit rises 1,450 metres (4,757 feet) above the Tasman Glacier in three kilometres. The mountain's toponym was applied by Julius von Haast to honour Henry De la Beche (1796–1855), an English geologist and the first director of the Geological Survey of Great Britain, who helped pioneer early geological survey methods. The first ascent was made in February 1894 by Tom Fyfe and George Graham via De La Beche Ridge. They also made the first ascent of Aoraki / Mount Cook that same year.

== Climate ==
Based on the Köppen climate classification, De La Beche is located in a marine west coast (Cfb) climate zone, with a subpolar oceanic climate (Cfc) at the summit. Prevailing westerly winds blow moist air from the Tasman Sea onto the mountains, where the air is forced upward by the mountains (orographic lift), causing moisture to drop in the form of rain or snow. This climate supports the Franz Josef, Ranfurly, and Rudolf glaciers surrounding the peak. The months of December through February offer the most favourable weather for viewing or climbing this peak.

== See also ==
- List of mountains of New Zealand by height

== Gallery ==
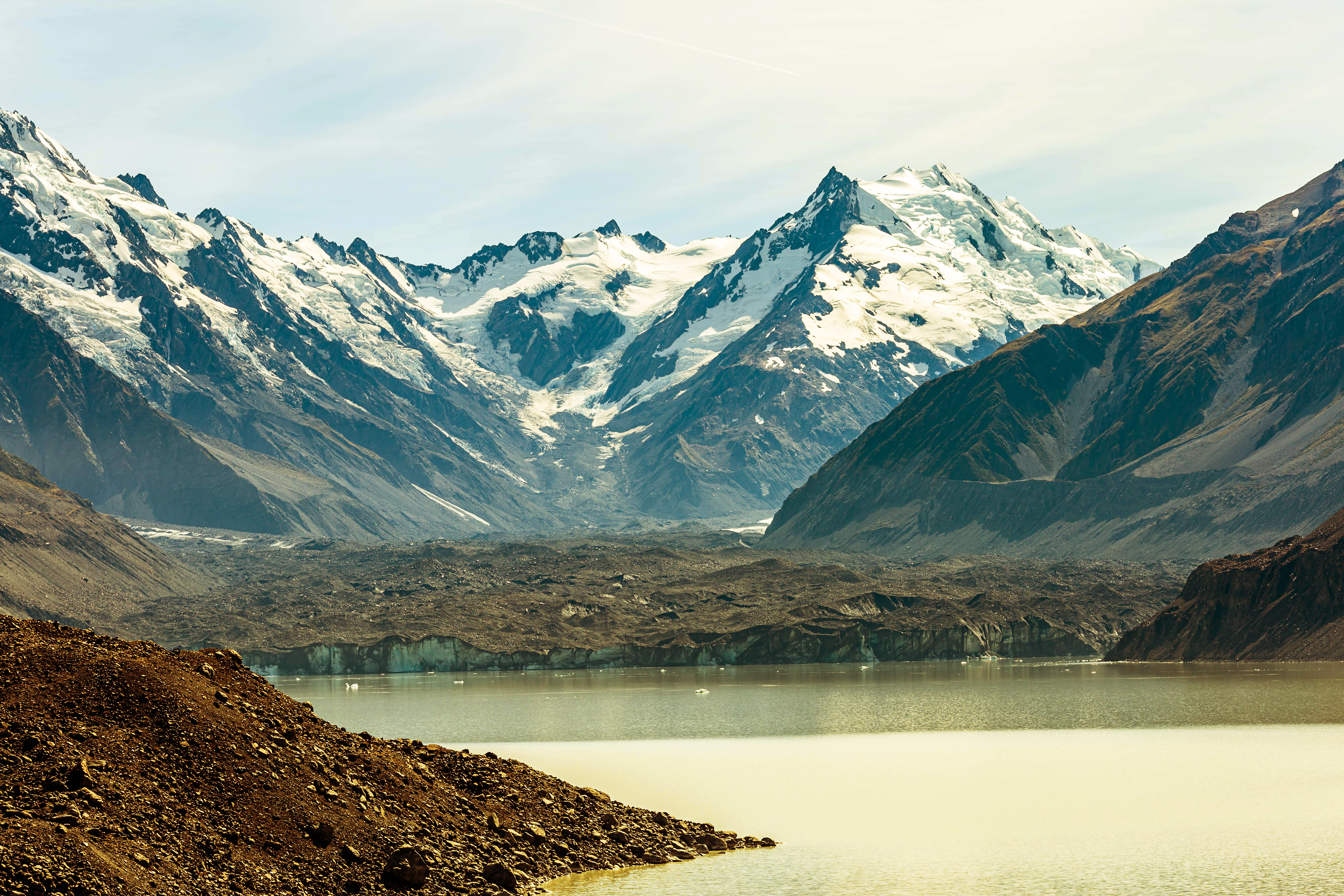
Mount Rudolf, De La Beche, and The Minarets (right).
Tasman Lake in foreground.

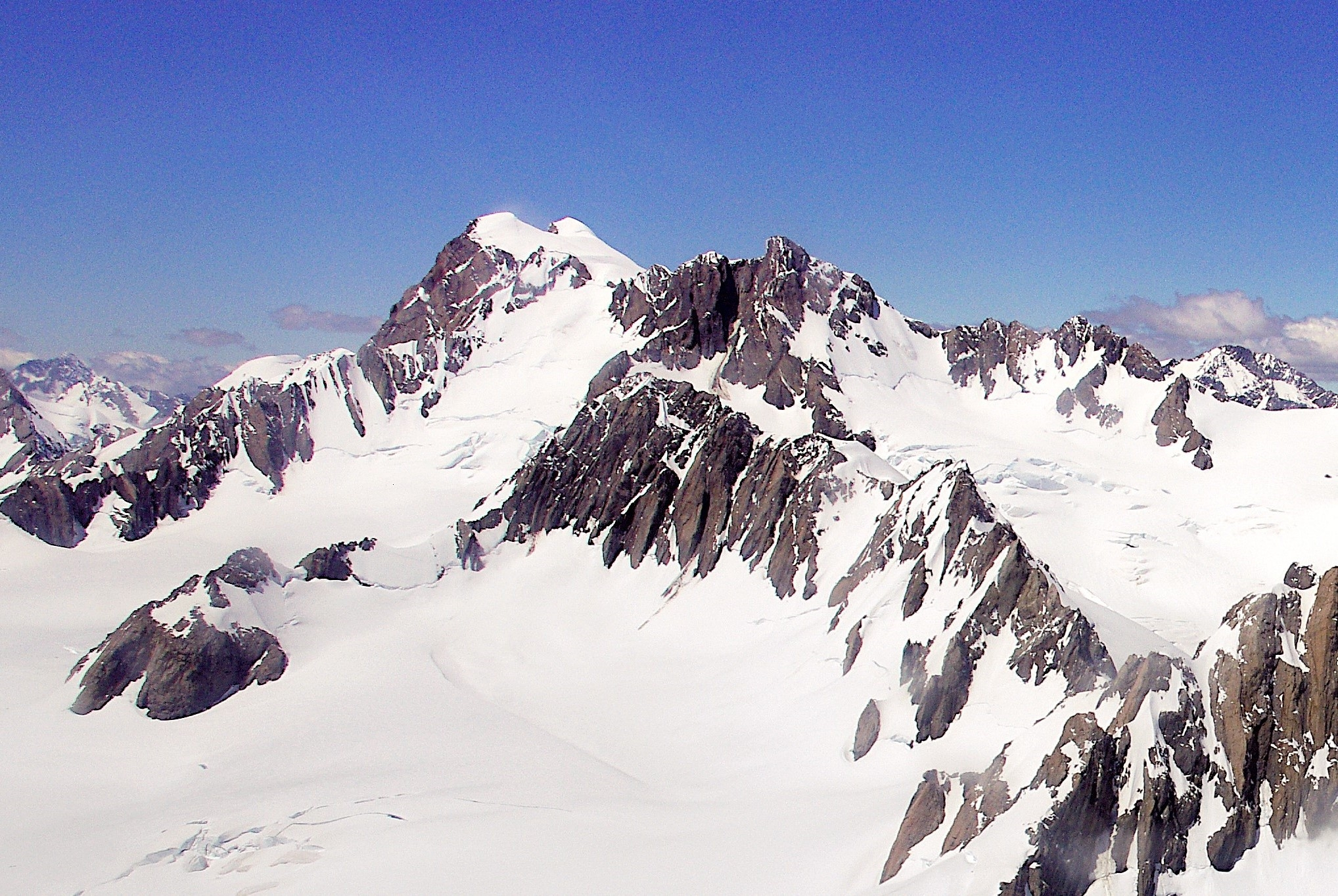
Aerial view from west with Mount Rudolf centred.
De La Beche and The Minarets in back.
