= The Minarets (New Zealand) =

Two mountain peaks in New Zealand

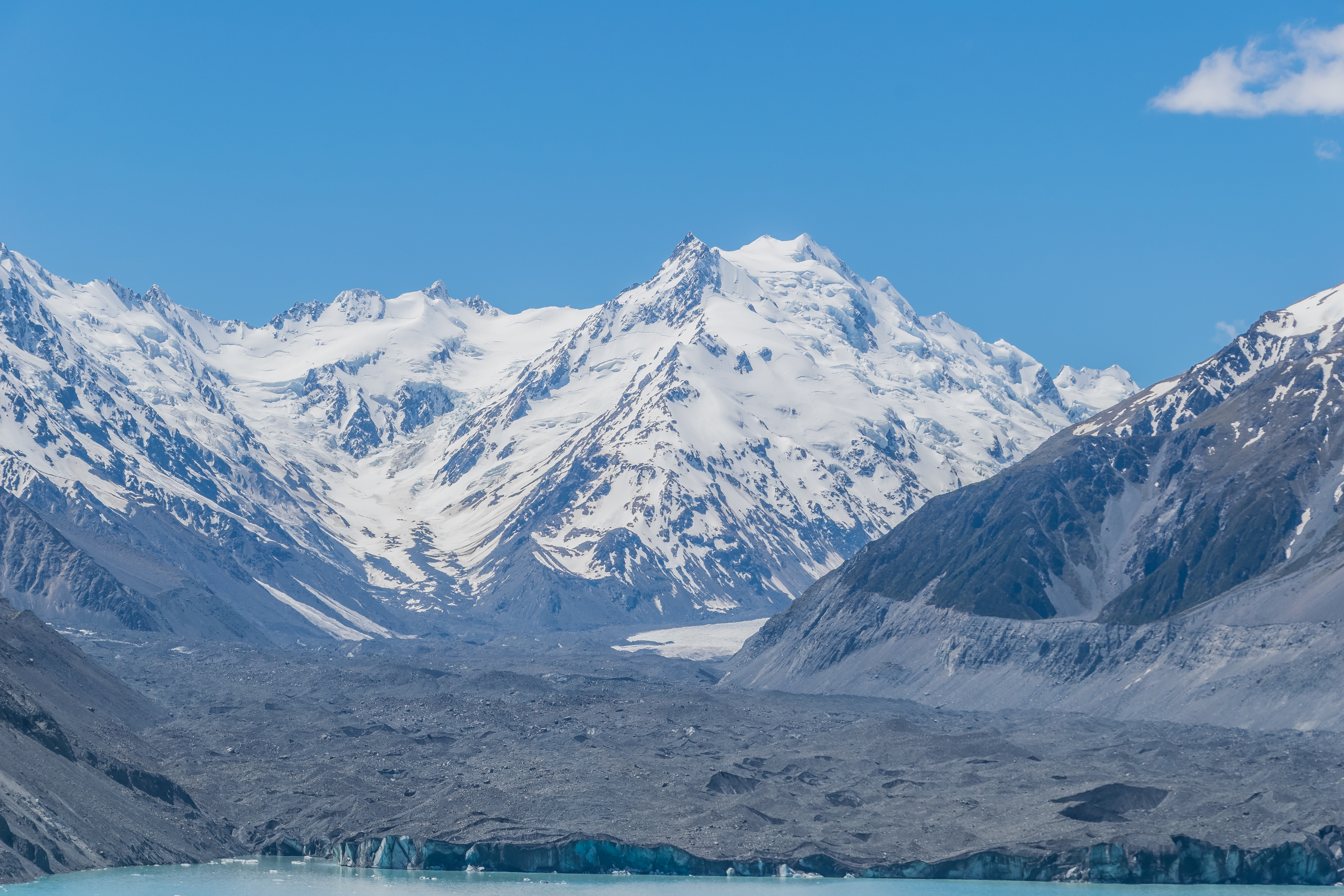
- Mount de la Beche and the Minarets

Highest point
- Elevation: 3,040 m (9,970 ft)
- Listing: New Zealand #8
- Coordinates: 43°30′31″S 170°16′21″E

Geography
- Location within New Zealand
- Location: South Island, New Zealand
- Parent range: Southern Alps

Climbing
- First ascent: 1895

The Minarets are two peaks of the Southern Alps approximately 180 metres (590 ft) apart, located in Westland Tai Poutini National Park in the South Island of New Zealand. Its southeastern and northwestern peaks have heights of 3,040 metres (9,970 ft) and 3,031 metres (9,944 ft), respectively. After the 3,109 metres (10,200 ft) Mount Elie de Beaumont, they are the northernmost three-thousand-metre peaks in the country and are a few kilometres away from the highest mountains in New Zealand. Most of the other three-thousand-metre peaks in the country are located in the immediate vicinity.

The first ascent was made by Tom Fyfe and Malcolm Ross in 1895.

== Gallery ==
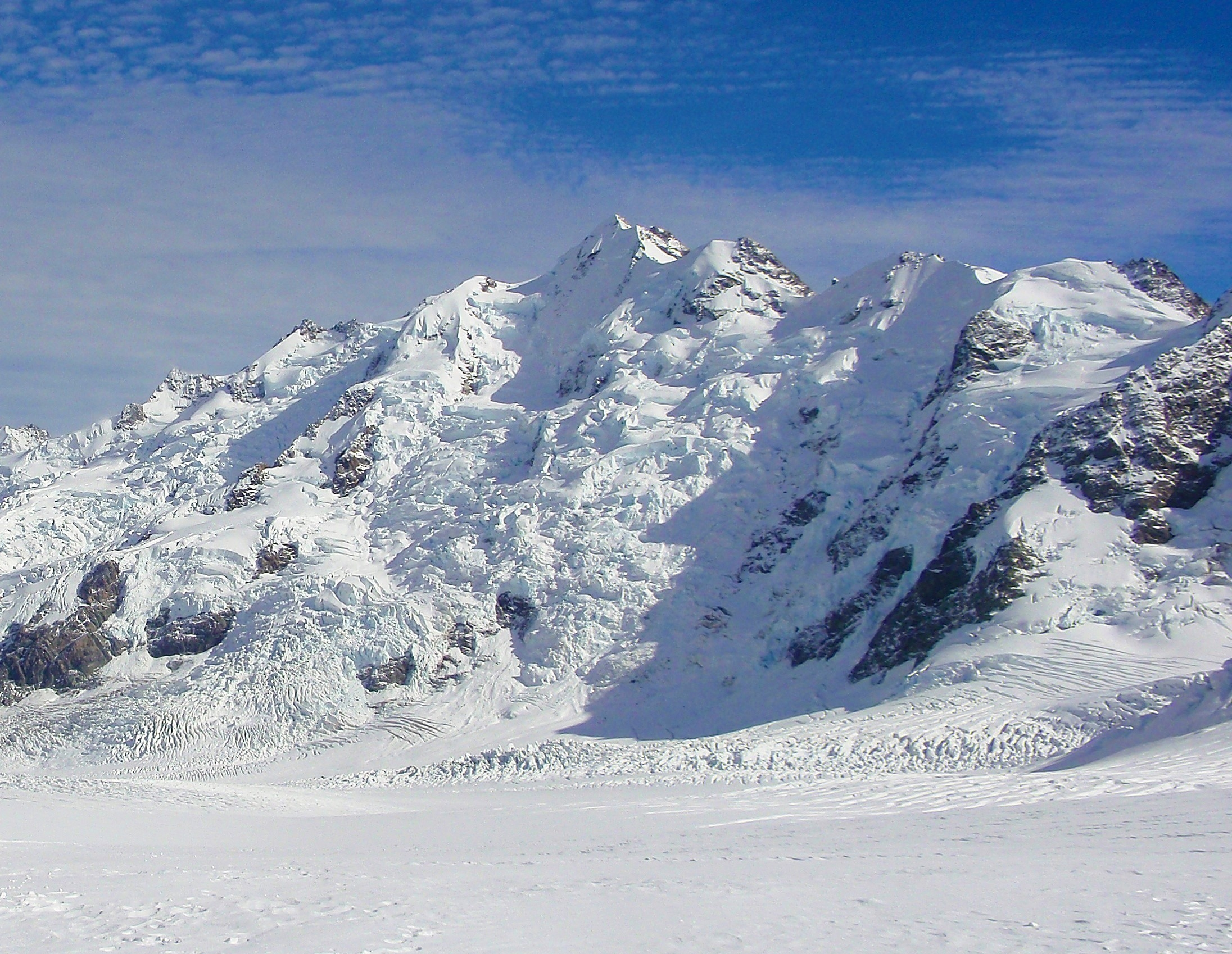
East aspect

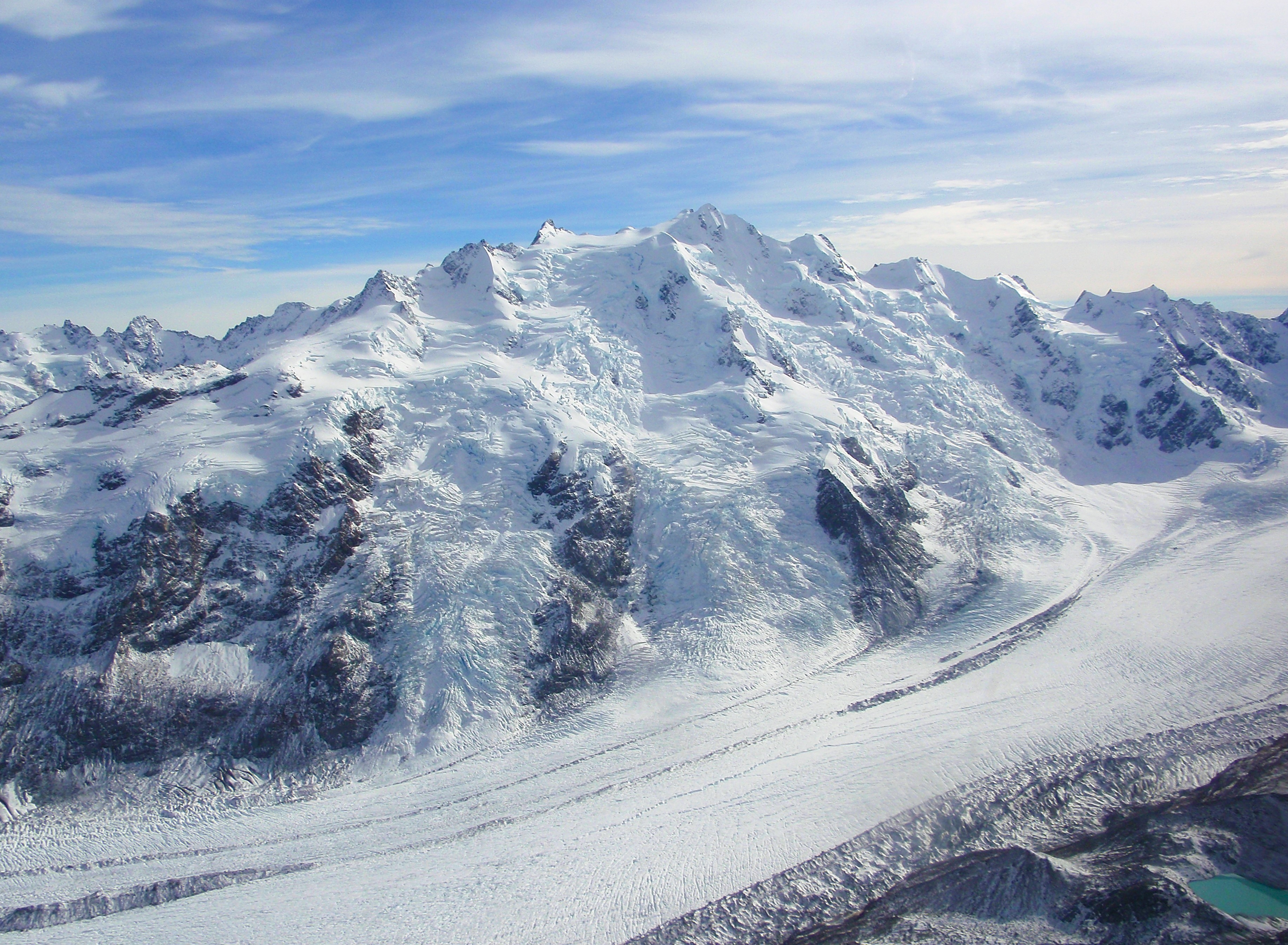
South aspect
