= Judkins =

Judkins is a surname. Notable people with the surname include:

- Anne Judkins (born 1964), New Zealand track and field athlete
- George Alfred Judkins (1871–1958), Australian Methodist minister
- Jeff Judkins (born 1956), American professional basketball player
- Jon Judkins (born 1964), American basketball coach, longtime head coach for the Utah Tech Trailblazers
- Quinshon Judkins (born 2003), American football player
- Rafe Judkins (born 1983), contestant on the 11th season of Survivor
- Robin Judkins ONZM, New Zealand sports administrator
- Roy Judkins, American soldier
- Stan Judkins (1907–1986), Australian VFL footballer with Richmond

== See also ==
- Amos Judkins House, historic house at 8 Central Avenue in Newton, Massachusetts
- Judkins shogi (ジャドケンス将棋 Jadokensu shōgi "Judkins chess"), modern variant of shogi (Japanese chess)
- Judkins Middle School, Pismo Beach, California
