= Kathy Lynch =

New Zealand cyclist

Personal information
- Full name: Kathleen Lynch
- Born: 23 April 1957 (age 69) Hāwera, New Zealand

Cycling career
- Sport: Cycling
- Current team: Retired
- Disciplines: Cross country road racing adventure racing
- Role: Rider
- Rider type: All-rounder

Major wins
- 1990 Xerox Challenge; Coast to Coast (five times); Karapoti Classic (eight times)

Kathleen Lynch (born 23 April 1957) is a retired competitive cyclist from New Zealand who competed both on and off the road. With a talent for multiple sports disciplines, she won the canoeing events New Zealand White Water Downriver and Slalom Championships in 1987 and represented her country at the 1988 Canoe Slalom World Cup. Around the same time, she was also a successful triathlete, but did not continue with that sport. She bought her first mountain bike in 1988 at the age of 31 in order to compete in an adventure sport event, and within a year she had become the New Zealand national cross country champion. Around the same time, she also took up road cycling. She was included in the New Zealand team for the 1990 Commonwealth Games and was assigned as domestique for the top New Zealand road rider, Madonna Harris. Harris and Lynch finished in fourth and ninth places respectively. In September 1990, Lynch competed at the inaugural UCI Mountain Bike World Championships and finished tenth. In November 1990, she became a household name in New Zealand by winning a 22-day multi-sport race the length of the country that had prime time TV coverage every night.

Lynch competed in road races and time trials, and off-road in cross country, in several world championships. She was not selected for the New Zealand road cycling team for the 1992 Olympics. She believed that omitting her was a mistake and intended to prove it by doing well at that year's Tour de France Féminin. She placed sixth in that race and demonstrated her good form. In 1992, she entered the UCI Mountain Bike World Championships in the veteran category and won bronze in both the cross country and the downhill events. When it was announced in 1994 that mountain biking was to become an Olympic discipline, Lynch's focus turned to being picked for the New Zealand team. For that reason, she swapped from the veteran class to elite at the world championships. She became New Zealand's first representative in an Olympic mountain biking event at the 1996 Summer Olympics in Atlanta, Georgia. Aged 39, she was the oldest competitor in the event, but managed to achieve eighth place, leaving two previous world champions behind her. She retired from serious competition after the Olympics, with the exception of the first UCI World Cup in April 1997 that was held in New Zealand. Until her mid-40s, she competed at the top level in adventure racing. During her domestic career, Lynch won many national titles, and was a serial winner at premium events such as the Karapoti Classic and the Coast to Coast.

== Early life ==
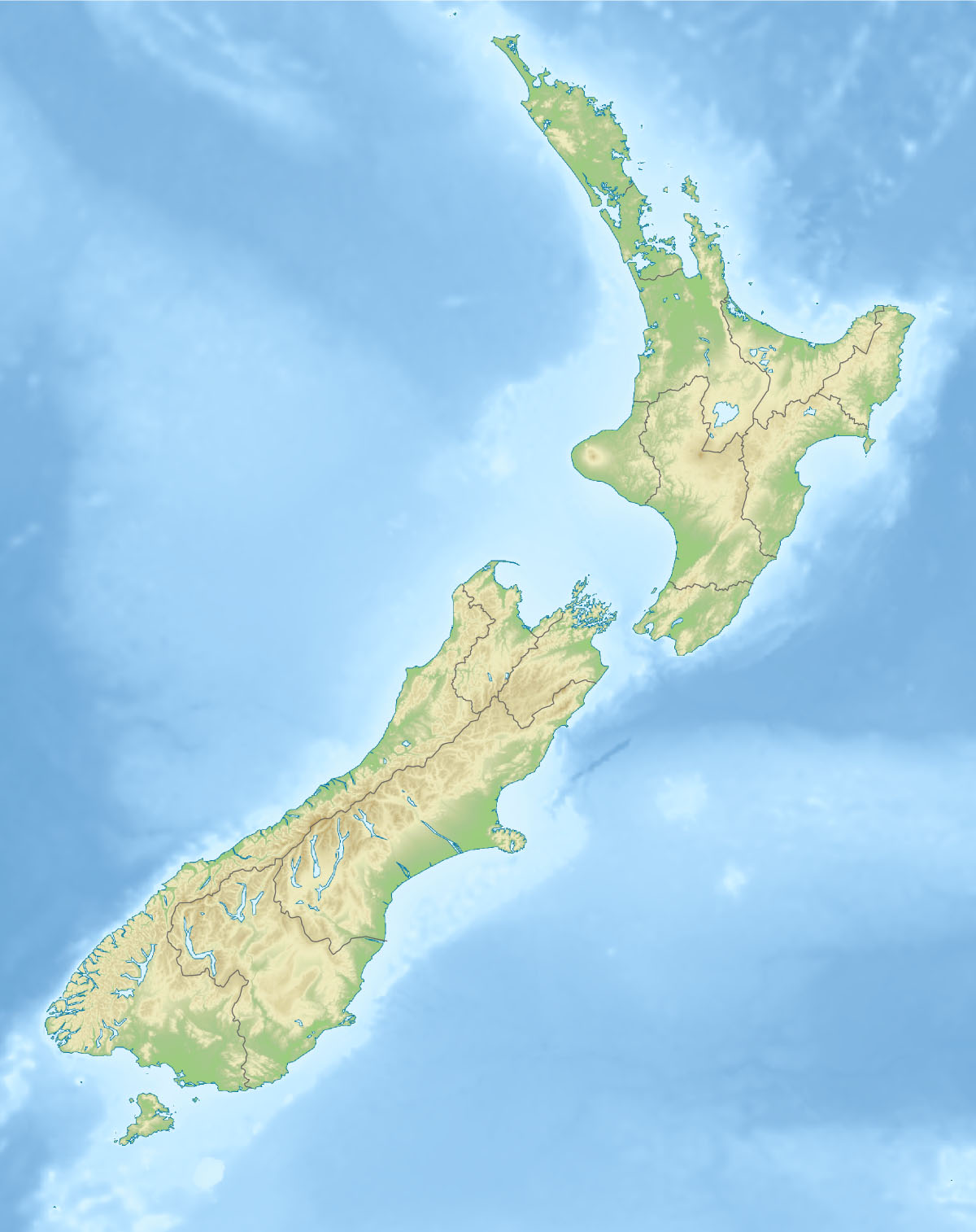
Lynch grew up in Hāwera, lived in Motueka during her time as a prominent sports person, moved to near Hokitika afterwards, and now lives near Methven

Kathy Lynch was born in 1957 in Hāwera, Taranaki and grew up in that town. She represented New Zealand in netball early in her life. (Note: Whilst the New Zealand Geographic is generally considered a reliable source, their article is the only instance that mentions Lynch's apparent netball career; the reliability of this detail is thus uncertain.) As a young woman, Lynch broke her leg while skiing at Whakapapa skifield. Pete Braggins was the ski patroller who assisted her and has been her partner since. They moved to Motueka in the 1980s. Lynch took up canoeing and in 1987 won the New Zealand White Water Downriver and Slalom Championships.

== Road and mountain bike racing ==
In 1988, at the age of 31, she bought her first mountain bike two weeks out from the Fresh Up Alpine Ironman in Queenstown. Her biographer, Simon Kennett, considered that she had purchased a bike with rather poor brakes (Lynch termed it a "piece of shit") and after weeks of crashing, Lynch thought mountain biking was a "dumb sport". Fellow Motueka resident Karen Holliday encouraged Lynch to take up road cycling instead. Lynch was laughed at when she turned up to her first race wearing coloured socks, when the convention was to race in white socks. In response Holliday and Lynch started wearing matching coloured socks for races. In 1988, Lynch competed in the inaugural season of the Canoe Slalom World Cup, and placed 19th in the overall standings in the K1 class. Lynch also tried triathlons and came fourth (out of 160 finishers) in the 1989 Nelson Women's Triathlon, but did not continue with that event.

Despite her initial dislike of the sport, she entered her first mountain bike race in February 1989 in an intermediate-level category and had lap times comparable to the winner of the women's expert category. She entered the next race in the expert category—the second round of the National Championship Series held on Christchurch's Port Hills—and came second. Lynch then borrowed a quality mountain bike and won the third race of the national series that was held in Queenstown with an impressive 11-minute margin. This saw her secure a sponsorship deal with Gary Fisher Mountain Bikes, then regarded as one of the best brands of mountain bike available. Her next race was the longer-distance Karapoti Classic, the fourth time that the race was held, and the fourth race of the national series. Helped by excellent conditions, Lynch took 38 minutes off the course record (set the previous year) and beat the previous year's winner by eight minutes. Lynch entered the last race of the national series as the clear favourite. The conditions in Riverhead, near Auckland, were "atrocious". Lynch had never raced in mud before and her time was 79 minutes slower than the winning elite man (compared to 37 minutes at the Karapoti Classic), but she was still 52 minutes ahead of the second-placed woman. In her first year of competitive mountain bike racing, Lynch had won the New Zealand championship.

=== 1990 Commonwealth Games ===
In the winter of 1989, Lynch concentrated on road cycling. The road up Takaka Hill, one of the toughest climbs for road cyclists in the country, was her twice-weekly training ride. Towards the end of the year, she competed in a qualifying race for the 1990 Commonwealth Games on a hilly course that "suited [her] perfectly" after her hill training. She finished half a length after Madonna Harris, which secured her a place in the New Zealand team. Lynch was assigned as Harris' domestique and did a good job at the Games by covering the breakaways well. At the end of the race, Lynch put on a sprint to the finish line that Harris could not keep up with and Harris dropped off her wheel. A "furious" Harris came fourth, and Lynch faded in the last 100 metres (330 ft) and came ninth, 2.5 seconds behind the winner.

Lynch was awarded the New Zealand 1990 Commemoration Medal.

=== 1990 UCI Mountain Bike World Championships ===
By the time she went back to mountain biking after the Commonwealth Games to defend her national title, Lynch had already missed the first two of the six rounds. As the four best results counted towards the title, there was no room for error. Lynch was in top form, won the remaining four national series races, and retained her title. With this accomplished, Braggins and Lynch travelled to the United States to prepare for the inaugural UCI Mountain Bike World Championships in 1990; prior to this, there were two separate events run by NORBA in the US, and by Grundig in Europe. At the final NORBA race, Lynch crashed badly. She took a couple of Aspirin, unaware that she was allergic to the drug. Just before the UCI World Championship race, Lynch needed hospital treatment for internal bleeding caused by her pain medication. She still competed, coming a "disappointing" tenth place in the cross country race after having hoped for a higher finish.

=== 1990 Xerox Challenge ===
The next race was just around the corner, and it was a big one. The 1990 Xerox Challenge was organised by Robin Judkins as one of the sporting events to celebrate the 150th anniversary of the signing of the Treaty of Waitangi. It was by far the hardest; the 22-day multi-sport event covered the length of the country—from Cape Reinga to Bluff—and included road cycling, kayaking, running, and mountain biking. There were 67 competitors, including 6 women, who embarked on the 2,384 kilometres (1,481 mi) challenge. While Lynch was the favourite for the women, she soon developed severe tendonitis and the race doctor threatened to pull her from the race if she refused to take an anti-inflammatory. She had no option but to take the medication if she wanted to remain in the race, and promptly ended up in Wellington Hospital from the reaction to the medication. Fortunately for her, the fellow competitors were stuck in nearby Mākara Beach, waiting for the weather in Cook Strait to settle enough to enable the kayak section. After two days, organisers abandoned the plan for the kayak section and Lynch was well enough to rejoin the race. The event featured every night on prime time TV and by the end of it, the two winners had become household names in New Zealand: Lynch, and Steve Gurney. It was Lynch's hardest race over her entire career and contributes to her being regarded as a "legend" of the New Zealand mountain bikers.

=== Coast to Coast and Karapoti Classic ===
Over the next few years, her movements in New Zealand were arranged around the most important national races. She won the Coast to Coast a record five times (1991–1994, 1996), (Note: The record was equalled in 2024 by Simone Maier of Wānaka.) the national mountain bike series every year until aged 40, and the Karapoti Classic all eight times that she started. In 1994, after being pushed by Susan DeMattei through the whole race, Lynch set a new race record at the Karapoti Classic that stood for 13 years. At the 1995 Karapoti Classic, she defeated the world number 2 – Caroline Alexander.

=== European road and cross country events, 1991 ===
On the international stage, Lynch tried to participate in the most important road and mountain bike events. She spent several weeks in Europe, racing road and cross country World Cup events in preparation for the 1991 UCI Mountain Bike World Championships. She entered in the Veteran category (women 30+) and came second, beaten by road racing legend Jeannie Longo. Part of her preparation in both 1991 and 1992 was to race on the New Zealand women's time trial team at the UCI Road World Championships; they came seventh and eighth, respectively.

=== 1991–1992 events ===
Back in New Zealand, Lynch did well in the premier women's road stage race in 1991 and 1992, and won bronze in the 1991 New Zealand National Road Race Championships, yet was not picked for the 1992 Olympic road cycling team. Her biographer speculates that the selectors were possibly influenced in their decision by Lynch's failure to get Harris into a medal position at the 1990 Commonwealth Games. She competed hard in the 1992 Tour Cycliste Féminin – the Tour de France for women. The ten-stage race was the most challenging event on the women's road racing calendar that year, and many big names entered. New Zealand had six competitors. Lynch set the tone for the team by coming fourth in the prologue in Paris. Jacqui Nelson and Lynch were the only New Zealanders remaining in the final stage, and Lynch came sixth ascending into Alpe d'Huez. Her biographer suggests that she made her point that her omission from the 1992 Olympic team had been a mistake.

Lynch then entered the veteran category of the 1992 UCI Mountain Bike World Championships in Bromont, Canada, winning bronze in both the cross country and the downhill events. In the cross country, she was in the lead before a minor crash ripped the seat off its metal frame. For over an hour, she stood on the pedals and lost two places.

=== 1993–1995 and selection for 1996 Olympic team ===
She had her usual domestic success in 1993, including a new record time in the Coast to Coast. Her focus sharpened in early 1994 when it was announced that mountain biking would be an Olympic event at the 1996 Atlanta Games. Although she would be 39 then, she did not want to give the selectors an opportunity to look past her. The 1994 domestic mountain bike season was the most competitive yet, with Kate Rattray and the visiting Susan DeMattei providing good competition, but it was 1995 where it counted. Rather than go for another veteran's medal, Lynch entered the Pro race at the 1995 UCI Mountain Bike World Championships in Kirchzarten in Germany's Black Forest. Lynch had a fierce start of the cross country race and led the field into the first climb. One by one, younger and full-time professional cyclists went past her, and Lynch ended up 21st, with Mary Grigson 33rd, and the other Kiwis further back. They had gained New Zealand two qualifying positions for the Olympics; no New Zealand men qualified. Grigson accepted an offer to race for Australia and left New Zealand (she competed at the Olympics in 1996 and 2000), so the New Zealand Mountain Bike Association decided to nominate just one competitor for the New Zealand Olympic team. The team was announced on 16 April 1996 and Lynch's name came up. This was by no means a foregone conclusion, and Lynch thinks that she was selected against the selection panel's inclinations:

I was out of favour with the selectors because I told one to go and get effed. I wouldn't play their dicky, dorky games.

Lynch's preparations for the Olympics consisted of winning the usual domestic events (Coast to Coast, Karapoti, and the cross country championships). With summer gone, she then moved to road cycling with its reduced recovery time between races. As the three Olympic road cycling qualifiers were overseas already, Lynch had no problem winning the New Zealand road race title and also became national time trial champion. Lynch generally downplays her achievements, instead arguing that other people lead "lazy lifestyles". Of her national road championship titles, she remarked:

It was not really a feat. I just rode off and left them.

=== 1996 Olympics ===
Two months prior to the Olympics, Lynch went to North America and competed in World Cup races in Canada and the United States. She then competed in the 1996 pre-Olympic cycle tour, winning one of the stages. Once she arrived at the Olympic Village in Atlanta, she was underwhelmed by the support she received from the cycling team; most had never been to a mountain bike event. The team jersey was unsuitable for the heat and humidity. Her new bike had a hole in the bottom bracket and the neutral tech support insisting that she couldn't ride it. Her old frame was couriered over with two days to spare. Life in the village was unpleasant due to constant security checks, and athletes who had completed their event partying all night. Lynch moved out and shared accommodation with Jacqui Nelson in a suburb. Whilst this required a two-hour bus ride to the mountain bike venue, it made for a more pleasant stay and sufficient sleep. The mountain bike course overlapped with the equestrian venue and was not open for mountain bike training until two days prior to the race. Lynch ignored this and promptly ran into an American army unit looking for bombs and was arrested. After an hour's detention, one of the mountain bike officials verified that she was a competitor. The race day, 30 July, was the hottest of the Olympic Games, and the 14 kilometres (8.7 mi) laps were reduced to 10.7 kilometres (6.6 mi). Lynch settled into fifth place in the first lap, but crashed on one of the corners. A few riders went past and she continued in 12th place. In the third lap, the heat became unbearable, but Lynch had a CamelBak with frozen drink; one of the few riders to do so. She kept her pace as other riders struggled. She finished 8th, with two previous world champions behind her (Juli Furtado in 10th, and Silvia Fürst in 16th).

=== Post-Olympic racing ===
Lynch saw the Olympics as a perfect time to retire from the serious competitions. She did not go to the 1996 UCI Mountain Bike World Championships in Cairns, Australia, but competed in the Southern Traverse Adventure Race instead. One event that she could not miss, though, was the Wellington mountain bike race that was part of the UCI World Cup in April 1997; it was the first UCI mountain bike World Cup race that had come to New Zealand. Her dominance early in the season waned, though, and she was beaten into second place at both the Coast to Coast (won by Andrea Murray) and the first race of the national series. At the Karapoti Classic, she only just fended off Jill Westenra. For the UCI World Cup race, Lynch was in top form and came sixth, well within her aim of a top 10 finish, and just days away from her 40th birthday. After that, she won the remaining rounds of the national championship races in which she started. In 1998, Lynch came second to Susy Pryde in the first three races of the national series, and then pulled out of the competition. When she was crowned Nelson Sportsperson of the Year in 1997, she had difficulty appreciating the accolade:

I would rather say I had won a race. I have never been a person for bells and whistles.

Lynch did more adventure racing. In 1999, she won the Southern Traverse in a team with Gurney, Nathan Fa'ave, and Aaron Prince. In 2001, she competed in the inaugural Discovery Channel World Championship, with Fa'ave and two others, and they came second. In 2002, Fa'ave called on Lynch again to replace a sick teammate for the Southern Traverse, and Lynch commented: "I had to help the poor buggers out. They weren't going to get anybody else at such short notice." Aged 45, she won yet another adventure race. The 2003 Primal Quest near Lake Tahoe in the United States was the last race that she competed in.

== Later life ==
Lynch moved to near Hokitika in the early 2000s and worked in farming, including clearing 20 hectares (49 acres) of gorse from some farmland. Around 2013, she moved to a rural block near Methven.

== Citations ==
- Kennett, Simon; Kennett, Jonathan (2012). The Muddy Olympians. ISBN 978-0-9864641-4-0.
