= Karapoti Classic =

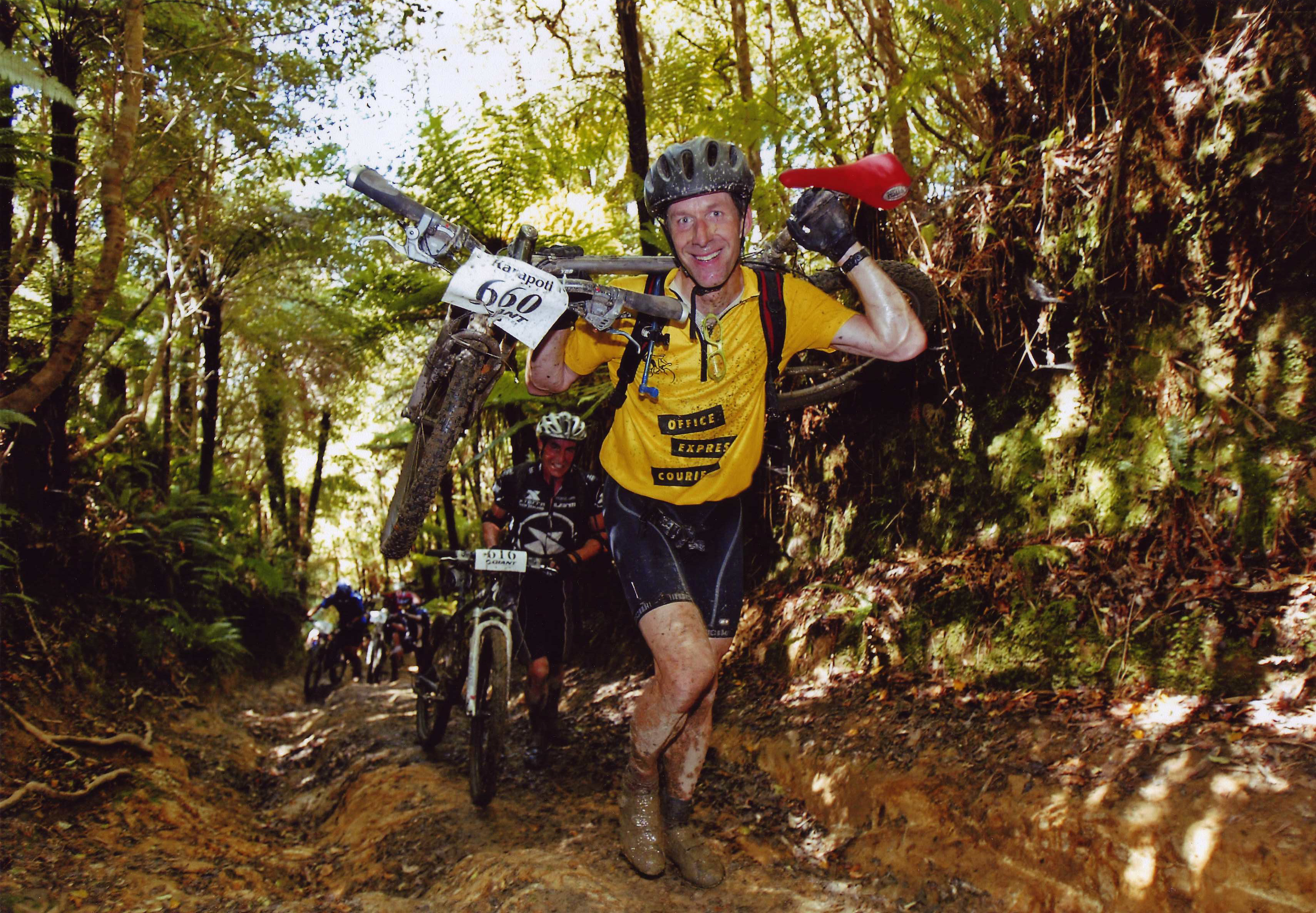
- One of the steep uphill passages (2006)

Race details
- Date: first Saturday of March
- Region: Karapoti Gorge and Akatarawa Forest, Upper Hutt
- Discipline: Cross country race
- Competition: Mountain Bike National Championships
- Type: single lap

History
- Editions: 32
- Most wins: Jon Hume (4 wins); Kathy Lynch (8 wins)
- Most recent: Kyle Ward; Samara Sheppard

The Karapoti Classic is New Zealand's longest-running annual mountain bike event, started in 1986 by Paul Kennett. The full course is 50 kilometres (31 mi) long and starts in Karapoti Park, Akatarawa, in Upper Hutt, and heads up the 8 kilometres (5.0 mi) Karapoti Gorge. From there it begins a single 30 kilometres (19 mi) loop in the native and pine forest of the Akatarawa Ranges.

The 1986 Karapoti was New Zealand's first national mountain bike race and was self declared the National Off-Road Championships. The event was managed by the Kennett Bros until 2002.

The event differs from most races because it comprises a large single loop and the route does not change from year to year.

With two exceptions, it has since 1993 been held on the first Saturday of March every year.

== Race records ==
Rider	Class	Time	Year
Anton Cooper	Men	2:07:57	2014
Kim Hurst	Women	2:45:29	2014

== Individual results ==
Male and female winners since the inaugural race are shown in the table below.

Event	Date	Men			Women		
Event	Date	Competitor	Residence	Time	Competitor	Residence	Time
1st	25 April 1986	Tim Galloway	Wellington	2:35:28	Anne Butler	Wellington	4:01:54
2nd	10 May 1987	Paul Kennett	Wellington	1:45:00	Phillipa Parsons	Wellington	2:27:51
3rd	27 February 1988	Simon Kennett	Wellington	2:54:30	Alison Mitchell	Christchurch	3:54:07
4th	2 April 1989	Grant Tyrrell	Hamilton	2:38:50	Kathy Lynch	Motueka	3:15:58
5th	30 March 1990	Paul Hinton	United Kingdom	2:40:18	Kathy Lynch	Motueka	3:10:12
6th	23 March 1991	Jon Hume	Tauranga	2:30:47	Kathy Lynch	Motueka	2:54:40
7th	28 March 1992	Jon Hume	Tauranga	2:34:50	Kathy Lynch	Motueka	3:13:26
8th	6 March 1993	Jon Hume	Tauranga	2:33:13	Susan DeMattei	United States	3:08:18
9th	5 March 1994	Jon Hume	Tauranga	2:22:04	Kathy Lynch	Motueka	2:49:42
10th	4 March 1995	Craig Lawn	Hastings	2:28:00	Kathy Lynch	Motueka	2:51:12
11th	3 March 1996	Craig Lawn	Hastings	2:36:27	Kathy Lynch	Motueka	3:13:08
12th	2 March 1997	Cliff Fellingham	Napier	2:28:00	Kathy Lynch	Motueka	3:10:45
13th	1 March 1998	Kashi Leuchs	Dunedin	2:20:46	Ann Mahoney	Wellington	3:07:56
14th	6 March 1999	Kim Eriksson	Sweden	2:30:39	Brenda Clapp	Nelson	3:16:40
15th	4 March 2000	Julian Mitchel	Christchurch	2:28:48	Sadie Parker	Auckland	2:59:12
16th	4 March 2001	Tim Vincent	Nelson	2:29:39	Sadie Parker	Auckland	3:05:42
17th	2 March 2002	Kashi Leuchs	Dunedin	2:23:06	Susy Pryde	Auckland	2:54:19
18th	1 March 2003	Tim Vincent	Nelson	2:24:23	Susy Pryde	Auckland	2:54:16
19th	6 March 2004	Peter Hatton	Australia	2:28:27	Lisa Mathison	Australia	3:01:00
20th	5 March 2005	Tim Vincent	Nelson	2:28:21	Rosara Joseph	Christchurch	2:56:35
21st	4 March 2006	Peter Hatton	Australia	2:18:01	Nathalie Schneitter	Switzerland	3:04:37
22nd	3 March 2007	Clinton Avery	Rotorua	2:14:00	Jennifer Smith	USA/NZ	2:47:35
23rd	1 March 2008	Stuart Houltham	Wellington	2:18:59	Fiona Macdermid	Palmerston North	2:47:41
24th	7 March 2009	Mark Leishman	Rotorua	2:28:39	Fiona Macdermid	Palmerston North	2:47:54
25th	6 March 2010	Tim Wilding	Wellington	2:21:39	Annika Smail	Rotorua	2:52:13
26th	5 March 2011	Anton Cooper	Woodend	2:26:32	Elina Ussher	Denmark	3:04:59
27th	18 March 2012	Mat Waghorn	Feilding	2:29:05	Fiona Macdermid	Palmerston North	2:55:32
28th	2 March 2013	Dirk Peters	Rotorua	2:25:02	Kim Hurst	Upper Hutt	2:50:31
29th	1 March 2014	Anton Cooper	Woodend	2:07:57	Kim Hurst	Upper Hutt	2:45:29
30th	7 March 2015	Eden Cruise	Porirua	2:28:01	Jennifer Smith	USA/NZ	2:49:49
31st	5 March 2016	Jack Compton	Porirua	2:07:57	Kim Hurst	Upper Hutt	2:42:12
32nd	18 February 2017	Kyle Ward	Australia	2:17:40	Samara Sheppard	Australia	2:42:45
