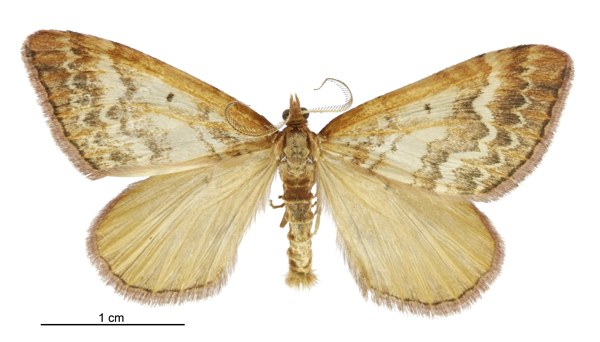
- Male

Scientific classification
- Kingdom: Animalia
- Phylum: Arthropoda
- Clade: Pancrustacea
- Class: Insecta
- Order: Lepidoptera
- Family: Geometridae
- Genus: Asaphodes
- Species: A. helias

Binomial name
- Asaphodes helias (Meyrick, 1883)

Synonyms
- Larentia helias Meyrick, 1883; Xanthorhoe helias (Meyrick, 1883)

= Asaphodes helias =

Species of moth

Asaphodes helias is a species of moth in the family Geometridae. It is endemic to New Zealand. It has been found in the middle and southern parts of the South Island. This species frequents tussock and scrubby habitat. The host plants of the larvae of this species include Cardamine and Ranunculus species. They have also been witnessed feeding on exotic buttercup species in the genus Bellis. Adults are on the wing in January and February.

== Taxonomy ==
This species was described by Edward Meyrick in 1883 as Larentia helias using material he collected in Dunedin. Meyrick gave a fuller description of the species later in 1884. George Hudson discussed and illustrated this species as Xanthorhoe helias in 1898. Hudson also discussed and illustrated the species under this name in his 1928 publication The Butterflies and Moths of New Zealand. In 1971 John S. Dugdale placed this species within the genus Asaphodes. In 1988 John S. Dugdale confirmed this placement. The type specimen is held at the Natural History Museum, London.

== Description ==
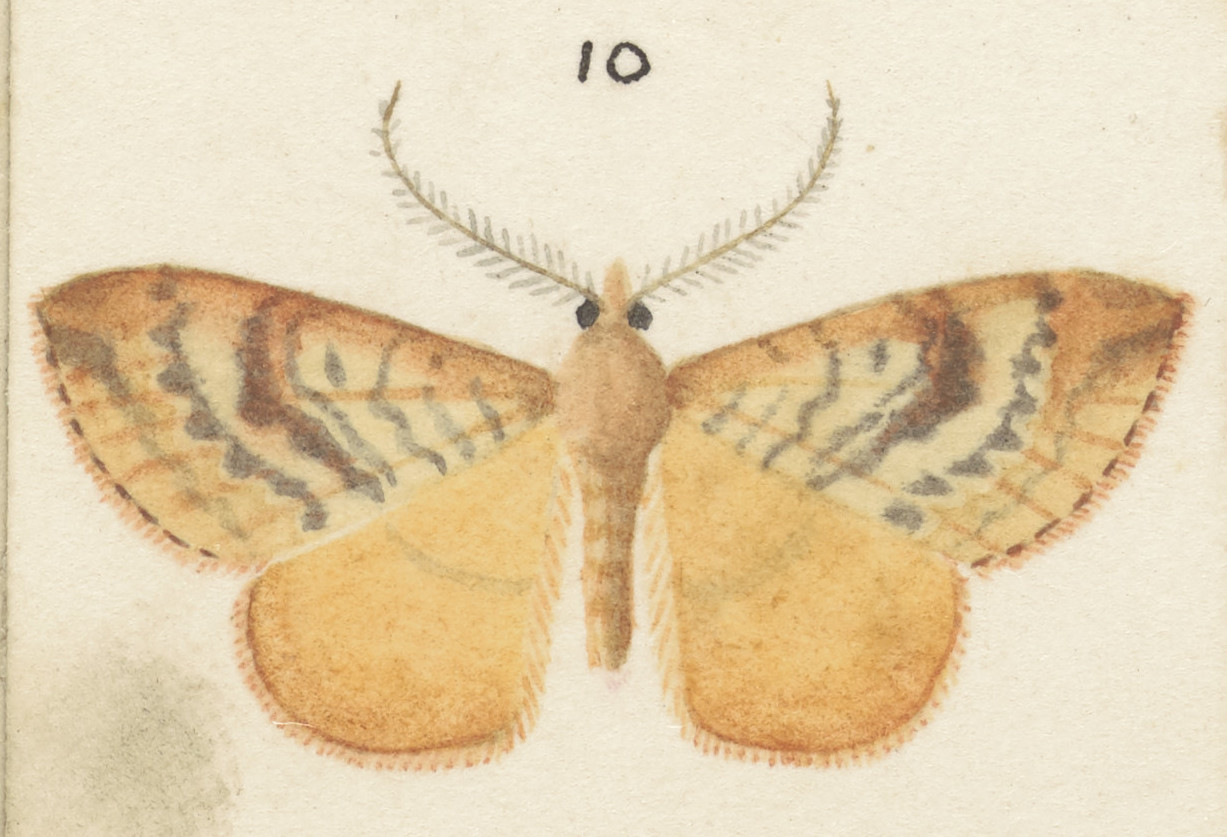
Illustration of A. helias by George Hudson.

Hudson described the species as follows:

The expansion of the wings is 1 inch. All the wings are pale ochreous; the fore-wings have a slender brown transverse line at the base, then a large loop-like marking from the costa, almost meeting a smaller, similarly looped marking from the dorsum; next a broad irregular dark brown band a little beyond the middle, considerably indented towards the termen; this is followed by a rather narrow pale band, and then by a narrow brown band, also indented towards the termen; there is a small oblique brown mark below the apex, and a terminal series of black dots. The hind-wings have several faint dusky transverse lines near the base, a row of small spots near the termen, and a terminal series of minute black dots. The cilia of all the wings are reddish-ochreous.

== Distribution ==
This species is endemic to New Zealand. As well as the type locality of Dunedin, the species has been found in the Dansey Ecological district and the Nevis Red Tussock Fen in Otago. This species has also been found near the Hooker traffic bridge close to Mount Franklin in Canterbury as well as on The Hump and Mount Cleughearn in Southland.

== Biology and life cycle ==
A. helias is on the wing in January and February.

== Habitat and host plant ==
This moth has been observed as frequenting tussock and scrubby areas that have the fern Polystichum vestitum present. The larvae of A. helias have been reared in captivity on forest herbs including Cardamine and Ranunculus species. Larvae have also been found feeding from species within these genera in the wild. The larvae of A. helias have also adapted to feeding on an exotic buttercup.
