= John Jacoby =

Australian adventure racer (born 1965)

Medal record

Men's canoe marathon

Representing Australia

World Championships
Gold medal – first place	1988 Nottingham	K-1 marathon

John Jacoby (born c. 1965) is an Australian adventure racer. In the mid-1980s, he dominated the world in canoe marathon, winning three successive world cup canoe marathons before becoming the inaugural ICF canoe marathon world champion at the 1988 event in Nottingham, United Kingdom. After the 1988 World Championship, he retired from International Canoe Federation (ICF) events and concentrated on adventure racing.

== Career ==
Jacoby competed in the 1987 Coast to Coast adventure race in New Zealand's South Island in the two-day team event with fellow Australian Andrew Maffett, coming in second place. In the following, Jacoby entered the "Longest Day" category of the event, competing in the race as an individual and completing the 238 kilometres (148 mi) of mountain running, road cycling, and river kayaking within one day. Maffett was his support person. The leading competitor had five minutes on Jacoby entering the river, but Jacoby had turned this into a 14-minute lead leaving the river. Jacoby won the event with the same lead over Steve Gurney, in a time of 12:02:59 hours. He narrowly missed out on winning a NZ$35,000 Ford Laser TX3 Turbo, which was the price for the first competitor to break the 12-hour mark. Jacoby would win the Coast to Coast on two subsequent occasions: in 1989 and in 1993. In 1991, he came in third place. Jacoby rates the Coast to Coast as one of his favourite competitions.

Jacoby competed in the 2004 Subaru Primal Quest. There was a rockfall that killed fellow competitor Nigel Aylott; the same rock hit Jacoby at the leg and put him into hospital.

In August 2015, Jacoby and fellow adventurer Brian Freeman paddled across the Bass Strait within 60 hours unsupported from Wilsons Promontory in Victoria to Little Musselroe Bay in Tasmania.
