= Deception River =

River in New Zealand

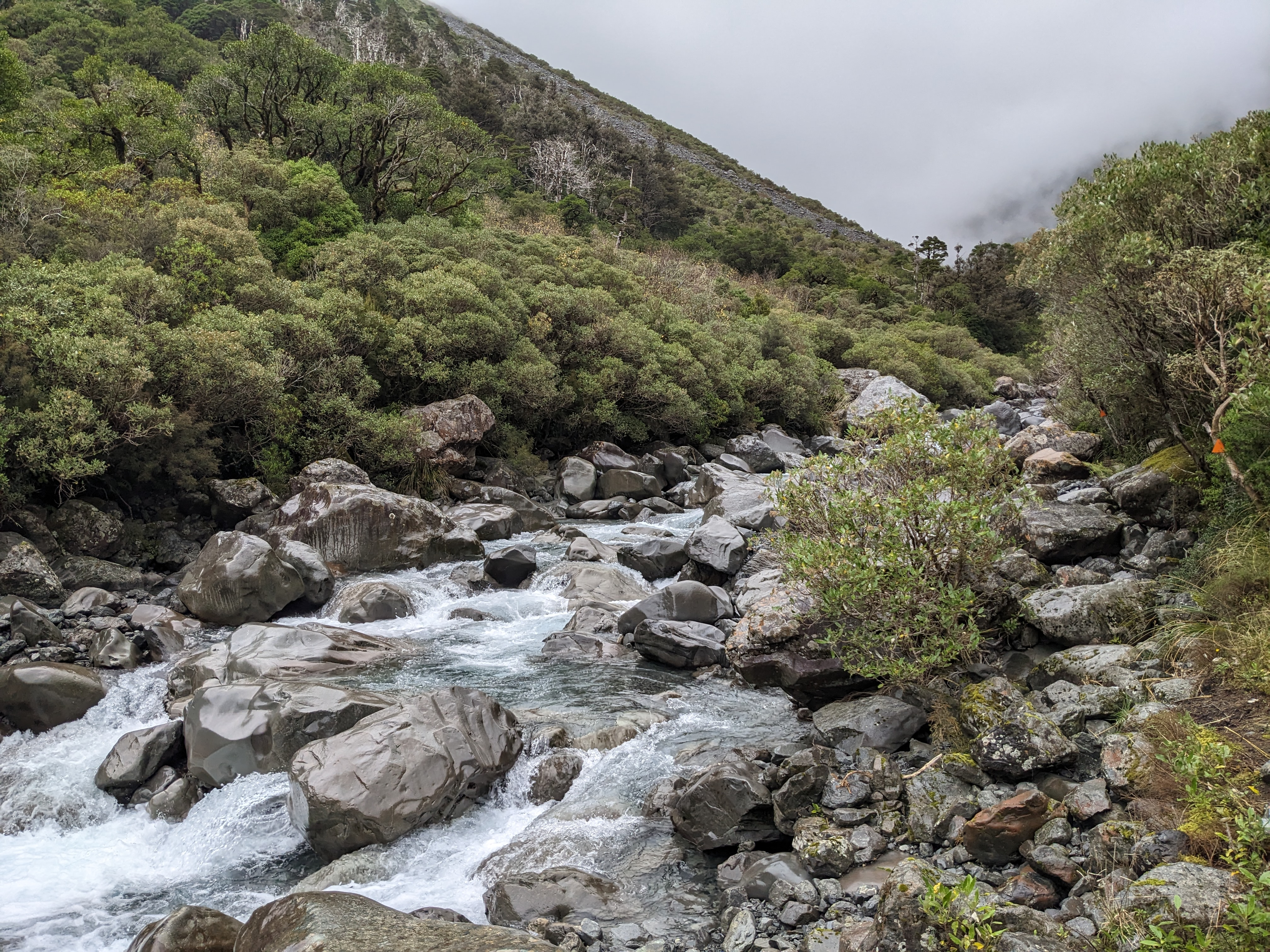
- Deception River near Goat Pass
- Route of Deception River
- Mouth of Deception River Deception River (South Island)

Location
- Country: New Zealand
- region: West Coast Region
- District: Westland District

Physical characteristics
- Source: Aicken Range
  - location: Southern Alps / Kā Tiritiri o te Moana
  - coordinates: 42°52′50″S 171°39′27″E
  - elevation: 1,200 m (3,900 ft)
- Mouth: Ōtira River
  - location: Aickens
  - coordinates: 42°47′21″S 171°36′13″E
  - elevation: 285 m (935 ft)
- Length: 17 km (11 mi)

Basin features
- Progression: Deception River → Ōtira River → Taramakau River → Tasman Sea
- Tributaries
  - left: Dorreen Creek, Shaffrey Creek, Gorge Creek, Foggy Creek, Twin Slip Creeks
  - right: Good Luck Creek, Spray Creek, Midday Creek, Tutu Creek, Twin Slip Creeks

The Deception River is a river in New Zealand. It is a tributary of the West Coast's Ōtira River, flowing generally north for 17 kilometres (11 mi) from its source on the slopes of Mount Franklin. It passes close to Goat Pass, which gives access to the Mingha River. Almost the entire length of the river is within the Arthur's Pass National Park.

The river was once called "Goat Creek". It was surveyed about 1900 as a possible alternative route for the Midland Line, and the surveyor warned that the water levels could be deceiving. About three months later, a flood from the river into the Otira Valley caused several thousand dollars' worth of damage to the railway, and the river was given its current name.

The Department of Conservation maintains a tramping track alongside the river, and it is part of the annual Coast to Coast race. Backcountry huts are available for trampers; one near Goat Pass and another a little further down the river.

== See also ==
- List of rivers of New Zealand
