= Speight =

Speight is both a surname and a given name. Notable people with the name include:

== People with the surname ==
- Bobby Speight (1930–2007), American college basketball player
- Clara E. Speight-Humberston (1862-1936), Canadian research scientist, scientific writer
- E. E. Speight (1871–1949), English academic in Japan and India, author, publisher
- George Speight (born 1957), also known as Ilikimi Naitini, Fijian politician and principal instigator of the 2000 coup
- Henry Speight (born 1988), Australian rugby player
- Jake Speight (born 1985), English footballer
- James Speight (1834-1887), co-founder of Speight's brewery, Dunedin, New Zealand
- Jesse Speight (1795–1847), American politician
- Johnny Speight (1920–1998), English television writer
- Lester Speight (born before 1965), American football player, wrestler and actor
- Mark Speight (1965–2008), British television presenter
- Mark Speight (born 1970), British organist
- Martin Speight (born 1967), English cricketer
- Mick Speight (born 1951), English footballer
- Peter Speight (born 1992), British skier
- Randolph L. Speight (1919–1999), American jurist
- Richard Speight (1838–1901), Australian railway commissioner
- Richard Speight, Jr. (born 1970), American actor
- Sadie Speight (1906–1992), British architect, designer and writer
- Wally Speight, English footballer
- Wilton Speight (born 1994), American college football player

== People with the given name ==
- Speight Jenkins (born 1937), American opera manager

== See also ==
- Speight's, a New Zealand brewery and their brand of beer
