= Karapoti Gorge =

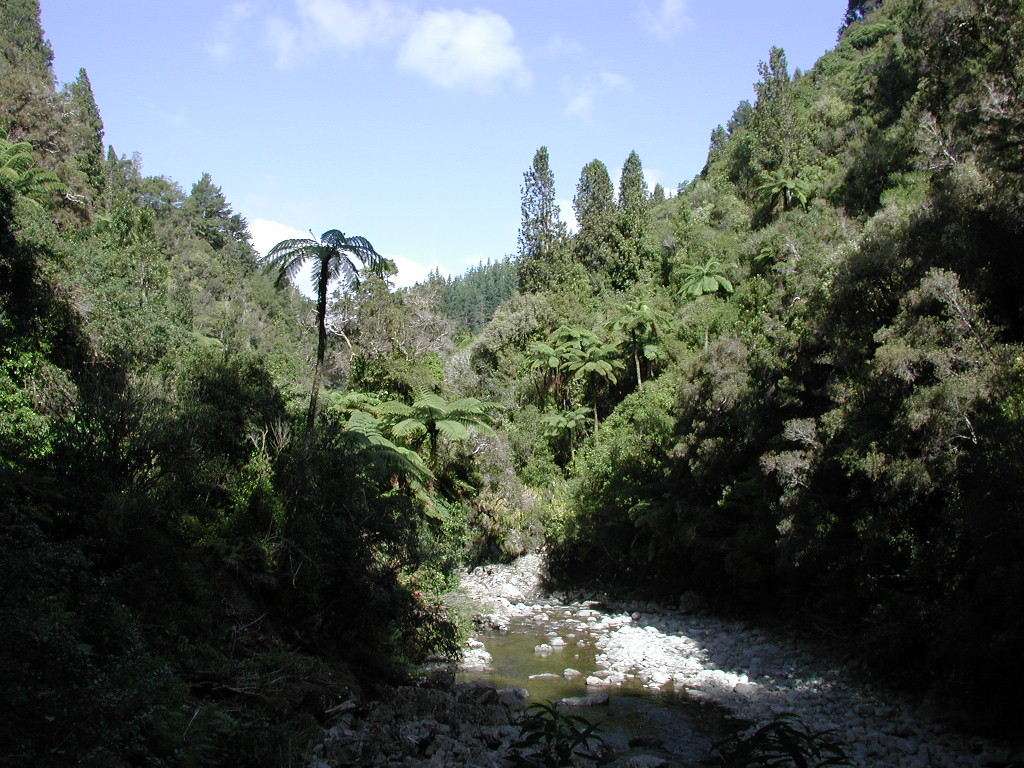
- Karapoti Gorge

- Location within New Zealand

Geography
- Coordinates: 41°03′30″S 175°05′33″E
- Interactive map of Karapoti Gorge

Karapoti Gorge is one of the entrances into the Akatarawa Forest, a regional park in the Wellington Region in New Zealand. The Akatarawa River West runs through this narrow, mostly bush-clad gorge towards the Akatarawa Valley. A narrow road winds its way along the steep slopes, providing access for trail biking, mountain biking and walking. Karapoti Gorge is also the starting leg of the annual Karapoti Classic mountain bike event, which runs on the network of tracks in the Akatarawa Forest.
