= Speights =

Speights SPAYTS is a surname. Notable people with the surname include:

- Marreese Speights (born 1987), American basketball player
- Omar Speights (born 2001), American football player

== See also ==
- Speight's
- Speight
