= Alpine Ironman =

The Alpine Ironman was first held on 21 October 1980 in New Zealand. It was a three-day race featuring skiing, trail running and kayaking. The idea for the event came from Robin Judkins, who became the race's director, and his friend and business partner Peter Tocker; they were running Motatapu Canoes (later called the Outdoor Adventure Centre) in Wānaka. Judkins was skiing with the general manager of Radio Otago and asked for a job as a radio announcer. A few days later, Judkins was asked to do a voice test by talking about his idea for the Alpine Ironman. He made up a story as he went along, including that Peter Hillary would be competing, and that the first prize would be a trip around the world. When the radio station told him that they wanted to broadcast this recording, Judkins was dumbfounded: "You're joking." They didn't, and Judkins went to Christchurch to find a sponsor, and organised the event within five weeks.

For the first three years, the Alpine Ironman was held at Wānaka. The next four events were based at Methven. The last three races were held at Queenstown. In 1990, the event was postponed as Judkins was organising the 22-day blockbuster event Xerox Challenge; the Alpine Ironman was not held again.

Judkins went on to organise the Coast to Coast race from 1983, and became widely known through having organised the 1990 Xerox Challenge.

The Alpine Ironman is considered by some to have been the first adventure race.
