= Lisa Mathison =

Australian cyclist

Personal information
- Full name: Lisa Mathison
- Born: 31 January 1985 (age 41) Brisbane, Australia

Cycling career
- Sport: Cycling
- Discipline: MTB
- Role: Rider
- Rider type: XC

Lisa Mathison (born 31 January 1985) is a professional cyclist from Brisbane, Queensland, Australia, specialising in cross-country mountain bike racing. She started competitive cycling at the age of 13 in 1998 and came to national and international attention in 2002 when she won the U19 cross-country World Championships in Austria. In 2003, she successfully defended her Under 19 world champion title in Switzerland. Her achievements in mountain biking won her a Union Cycliste Internationale (UCI) scholarship under the tutelage of legendary Swiss ex-pro, Chantal Daucourt, at the coaching facility in Aigle, Switzerland.

Major awards already bestowed on Mathison include 2004 Australian Female MTB Cyclist of the Year; 2003 Sport Industry Australia Young Female Athlete of the Year; Australian Female Junior MTB of the Year for 2002 and 2003; and Queensland Cyclist of the Year for 2003.

In an interview in 2002 she said Cadel Evans, was a role model: "I've been following his progress and looking up to him since my early days. He's definitely a bit of an inspiration!" On whether she would make the transition to road racing she elaborated "I don't know if I could swap over like Cadel Evans has done, but it's something to think about."

In the 2004 Summer Olympics cross-country cycling event, Mathison finished a respectable 10th place. While still concentrating on cross-country mountain bicycle racing, Mathison is also a member of the Australian Institute of Sport Women's Road Cycling team in 2005. The team included Amy Gillett, who was killed by a car while on a training ride in Germany.

== Palmarès ==
2004
1st XC Oceania Titles NZL
1st Karapoti Classic NZL
1st XC Australian MTB Titles VIC
1st Women's Wildside TAS
3rd World Class MTB GER
10th 2004 Summer Olympics GRE

2003
1st U19 XC World Championships SUI
1st Elite XC Australian Titles VIC
1st U19 XC Raid SFR Cassis FRA
2nd Elite XC Oceania Titles AUS

2002
1st U19 XC World Championships AUT
1st U19 XC Swiss Cup SUI
1st U19 Swiss Cup Series Final SUI
1st Elite XC NZ National Championships NZL
1st Elite XC Victorian State Championships AUS
1st Elite XC NSW State Championships AUS
