= Richard Ussher =

New Zealand sportsman

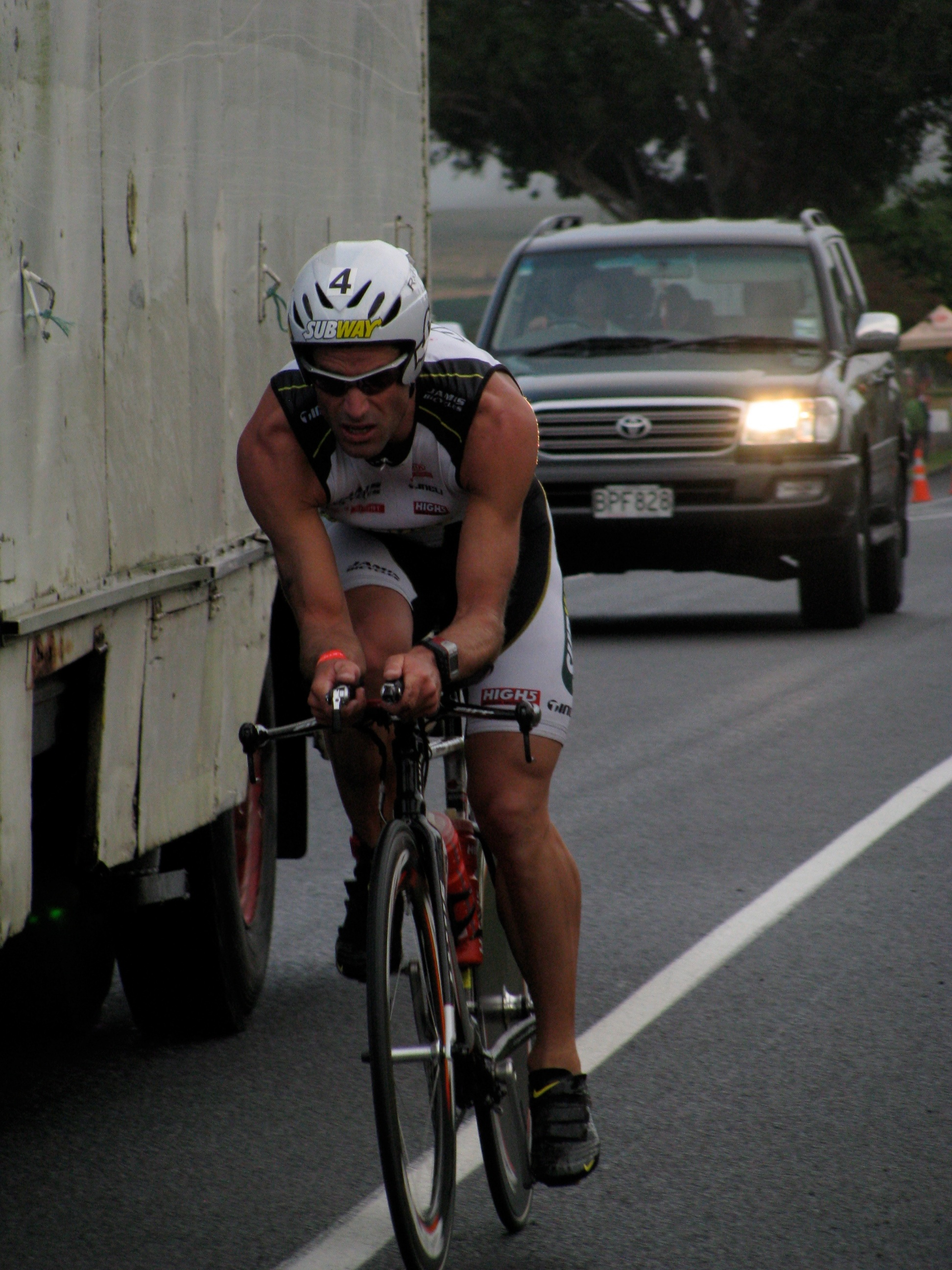
- Richard Ussher at Ironman New Zealand 2009

Personal information
- Full name: Richard Arland Ussher
- Nationality: New Zealand
- Born: 19 June 1976 (age 50) Wellington
- Height: 5 ft 11 in (1.80 m)
- Weight: 79 kg (174 lb; 12.4 st)

Sport
- Country: New Zealand
- Sport: Skiing

Achievements and titles
- Olympic finals: 1998 Winter Olympics, Men's Moguls

Richard Arland Ussher (born 19 June 1976) is a New Zealand multisport athlete. He has represented his country at the 1998 Winter Olympics and is a five-time winner of the Coast to Coast multisport race, and formerly held the New Zealand Ironman-distance Triathlon record at 8hr 2min 15sec. From 2015-18, he was the race director for the Coast to Coast.

Ussher was born and raised in Wellington and attended Onslow College and Hutt Valley High School.

He represented New Zealand in the freestyle skiing event of moguls at the 1998 Winter Olympics in Nagano, Japan. He finished 25th.

Ussher is married to Finnish multisport competitor Elina Ussher (née Maki-Rautila) (also a three-time winner of the Coast to Coast) and they formed Adventure racing team Adventure Sport NZ, which won the Abu Dhabi Adventure Challenge in 2007, 2008, and 2009. The team also consisted of Aaron Prince and Gordon Walker the first year. Jarad Kolar and Jay Henry the second year and Marcel Hagener and Nathan Fa'avae the third year. The same team of Richard Ussher, Elina Ussher, Marcel Hagener and Nathan Fa'avae won the race again in 2010 as Team Thule.

After his Coast to Coast win in 2008 Ussher announced his retirement from multisport to focus on Ironman Triathlon events. He cited a lack of professional athletes in multisport providing few challenging competitors, but later returned to multisport. In 2015, he took over as race director at the Coast to Coast from the event's founder, Robin Judkins.
