= Athletics at the 1990 Commonwealth Games – Women's 10 kilometres walk =

Women's 10 kilometres walk at the Commonwealth Games

The women's 10 kilometres walk event at the 1990 Commonwealth Games was held in Auckland. It was the first time that a women's race walking event had taken place at the Commonwealth Games.

== Results ==
Rank	Name	Nationality	Time	Notes
1st place, gold medalist(s)	Kerry Saxby-Junna	Australia	45:03	
2nd place, silver medalist(s)	Anne Judkins	New Zealand	47:03	
3rd place, bronze medalist(s)	Lisa Kehler	England	47:23	
4	Lorraine Jachno	Australia	47:35	
5	Janice McCaffrey	Canada	48:26	
6	Beverley Hayman	Australia	48:50	
7	Helen Elleker	England	49:51	
8	Alison Baker	Canada	50:54	
	Ann Peel	Canada	DNF	
	Betty Sworowski	England	DNF	
	Jane Jackson	New Zealand	DQ	
