= Abu Dhabi Adventure Challenge =

The Abu Dhabi Adventure Challenge was an annual multi-sports endurance race during which co-ed teams of four made their way through a punishing six-day, 400 kilometre (average) route across Abu Dhabi - the largest of the seven emirates which make up the United Arab Emirates. The event was held under the patronage of His Highness Sheikh Hazza bin Zayed Al Nahyan, Chairman of Abu Dhabi Sports Council and had a prize purse of US$236,500, with the winning team receiving US$40,000.

Incorporating a number of disciplines, including trail running, sea kayaking, rope works, mountain biking, desert orienteering and adventure running, the Abu Dhabi Adventure Challenge was developed by Abu Dhabi Tourism Authority (ADTA) to showcase the emirate's diverse landscapes, including city scenes, islands, desert, oases and rocky heights.

== History ==
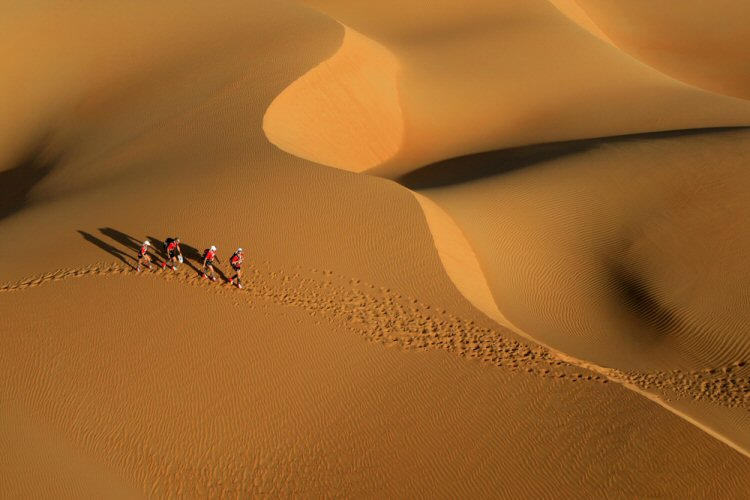
In 2010 a record-breaking 50 teams from 20 nations will head into the vast Empty Quarter desert

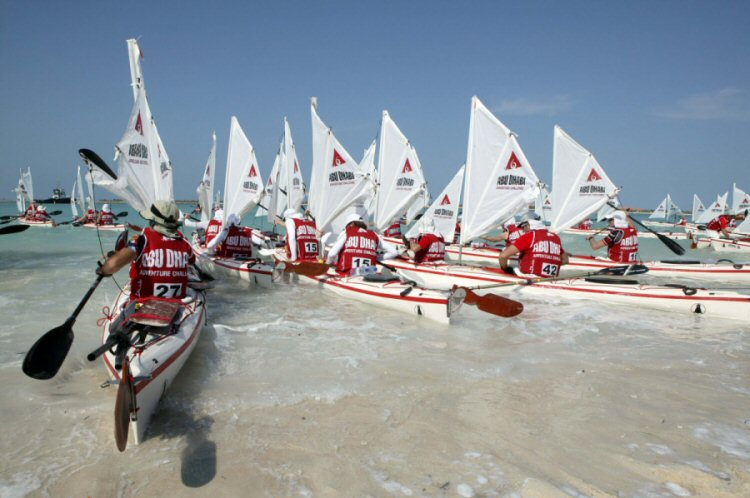
Sea kayaking will be amongst the challenges the teams will face

Since its inception in 2007, the Challenge has attracted a swelling number of participating teams from across the globe which has earned it a reputation of the world's most international adventure race.

The first Abu Dhabi Adventure Challenge took place from the 9–14 December 2007, and featured 26 teams from 15 countries. The route was 404 kilometers with an altitude difference of 5,165 metres.

The winners were New Zealand's Eurosport team, which was made up of Richard Ussher (Captain – New Zealand), Elina Ussher (Finland), Aaron Prince (New Zealand) and Gordon Walker (New Zealand).

The 2008 edition, which ran from 12 to 17 December, started with 36 teams from 19 nations (384 kilometre/4,277 metre) - a 30 percent increase in entries over the previous year. Boasting a new look route, which incorporated the nature-based destination of Sir Bani Yas island in the emirate's Al Gharbia (Western) Province, the 2008 event was again won by a team captained by Richard Ussher (New Zealand). Racing under the banner of Team Desert Islands, Ussher was joined by Elina Ussher (Finland), Jarad Kohlar (Australia) and Henry Jay (USA).

The 2009 edition, which was held from 4–9 December, increased in entries again. A then-record 40 teams from 20 nations completed the 379 kilometres distance at an altitude difference of 4,979 metres. Richard and Elina Ussher (Team Quasr Al Sarab) achieved their hat trick, winning for the third time in a row with a commanding display.

For 2010, the Abu Dhabi Adventure Challenge saw team participation reach full capacity three months before the race with 50 teams from 20 nations confirmed for the new-look event, running 10–15 December.

A clear sign of the sport's increasing domestic popularity, nine UAE-based teams had signed up - the largest number to be enrolled from the local market - and a third up on last year. Traditional adventure racing stalwarts France had eight teams in the fray and Great Britain had four.

Australia, New Zealand, Sweden, the United States and South Africa had also increased their entries with three teams each, with Russia and China having two apiece. Switzerland, Canada, Denmark, Germany, Italy, Norway, Poland, Singapore, Turkey and Spain rounded off the list of participating nations with one team each.

Twenty eight teams debuted at 2010's Challenge, with Canada, Norway and New Caledonia, a Southwest Pacific island, being represented for the first time.

== Route ==
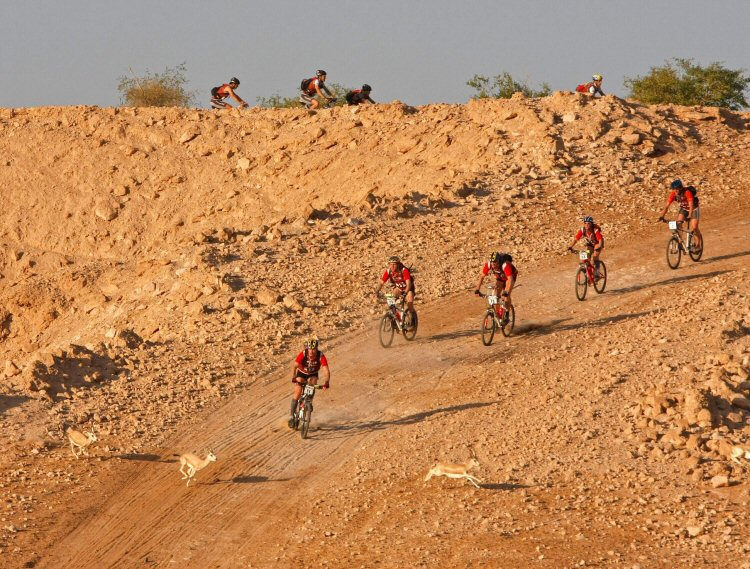
Mountain biking across Abu Dhabi's rich natural landscape will be one of the exciting stages for this year's competitors

Whilst the route changes from year to year, it retains certain characteristics. Traditionally, the Abu Dhabi Adventure Challenge begins with a spectator-friendly, multi-discipline Abu Dhabi city leg.

This is generally followed on day two with a sea kayaking leg, where teams take to the Persian Gulf’s shallow waters in specially designed two-man kayaks.

Days three, four and five typically see the athletes enter the Rub' al Khali (Empty Quarter) and the eastern Liwa Oasis village of Hamim, where they have to complete a multi-leg desert orientation and mountain-biking route.

The final day sees the athletes scale Jebel Hafeet – one of the emirate’s tallest peaks – before completing a sprint to the historic Jahili Fort in the oasis city of Al Ain, the cultural heart of the emirate.

== 2010 Route ==
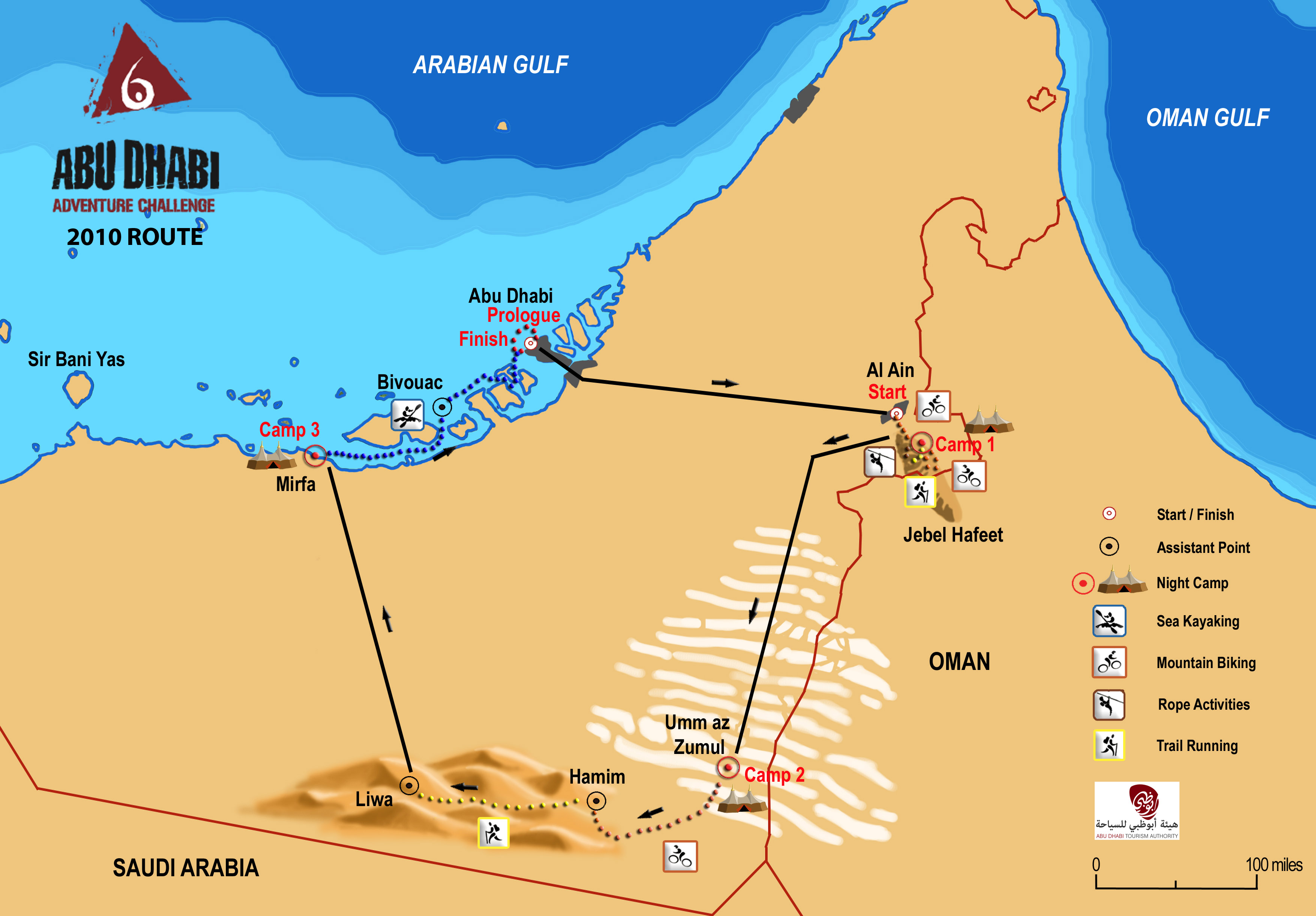
Map ADAC 2010

In addition to an enhanced line-up, the 2010 Challenge boasts a new-look course, with the six-day race beginning and ending in the UAE capital for the first time.

Following the traditional city-wide triathlon prologue, teams will navigate in a clockwise direction from east to west, beginning in the Oasis City of Al Ain for a confrontation with the rugged outcrops of the emirate’s highest peak, Jebel Hafeet - a complete direction reversal of previous years’ courses.

From the mountains, the teams will then traverse the vast expanse of the Rub’ al Khali - one of the world's largest expanses of unbroken sand, larger than the Netherlands, France and Belgium combined – for two-days of multi-checkpoint, lung bursting desert trekking. Tactics also come into play during this leg, as teams have to choose whether to attempt all checkpoints, or miss key ones and take the time penalty in lieu of saving energy in the precipitous 200-meter high dunes.

The endurance race finally ends with a two-day, 128-km sea kayaking section back to the finishing line in Abu Dhabi city.

== Roll of honour ==
| Year | Rank | Team | Team members | Time |
|---|---|---|---|---|
| 2007 | 1. | (New Zealand) Eurosport NZ | Richard Ussher, Elina Ussher, Aaron Prince, Gordon Walker | 40:55:12 hrs |
| | 2. | (United States) Nike | Mike Kloser, Michael Tobin, Chris Forme, Sari Anderson | 41:15:32 hrs. |
| | 3. | (France) Wilsa Helly Hansen | Karine Baillet, Francois Faloci, Sebastien Sxay, Alain Berger | 41:26:25 hrs. |
| | 23. | (United Arab Emirates) TDIC - Right To Play | Farah Barakat, Gregory Antunes, Steve Coutard, Francois Lhote | 116:11:10 hrs. |
| 2008 | 1. | (New Zealand) Desert Islands | Richard Ussher, Elina Ussher, Jarad Kohlar, Jay Henry | 39:18:20 hrs. |
| | 2. | (New Zealand) Team NZL | Gordon Walker, Gordon Blythen, George Christison, Fleur Pawsey | 39:25:23 hrs. |
| | 3. | (France) Sport 2000 Vibram Outdry | Jacky Boisset, Myriam Guillot, Sylvian Montagny, Francois Faloci | 39:31:42 hrs. |
| | 28. | (United Arab Emirates) Emerson | Giles Richardson, John Young, Kevin West, Rachel Clough | 63:24:45 hrs. |
| 2009 | 1. | (New Zealand) Qasr Al Sarab | Richard Ussher, Elina Ussher, Marcel Hagener, Nathan Fa'avae | 46:19:06 hrs. |
| | 2. | (New Zealand) ADCO | Fleur Pawsey, George Christison, Gordon Blythen, Stuart Lynch | 46:55:14 hrs. |
| | 3. | (France) Vibram Sport 2000 | Jacky Boisset, Myriam Guillot, Sylvain Montagny, Dwarne Farley | 47:26:16 hrs. |
| | 13. | (United Arab Emirates) Abu Dhabi Falcons | Adrian Heyes, Kevin Wesy, John Young, Catherine Todd | 56:32:25 hrs. |
| 2010 | 1. | (New Zealand) Thule | Richard Ussher, Elina Ussher, Marcel Hagener, Nathan Fa'avae | 45:44:47 hrs. |
| | 2. | (France) Thule Europe | Jacky Boisset, Myriam Guillot, Martin Flinta, Jarad Kohlar | 47:08:08 hrs. |
| | 3. | (Switzerland) Wenger | Bernhard Hug, Benjamin Rossmann, Andrea Huser, Marc Pschebizin | 47:39:01 hrs. |
| | 15. | (United Arab Emirates) 2XU Blackberry | Darryl Chiles, Cath Todd, Adam Marcinowicz, Bruce Duncan | 58:14:56 hrs. |

== Videos ==
1. https://www.youtube.com/watch?v=IFariQpvqlo

2. https://www.youtube.com/watch?v=5WFF0tj1zTY

3. https://www.youtube.com/watch?v=l3nvhiHDda8

4. https://www.youtube.com/watch?v=7hLoFT79q8s
