= Coast to Coast (race) =

Annual multisport competition in New Zealand

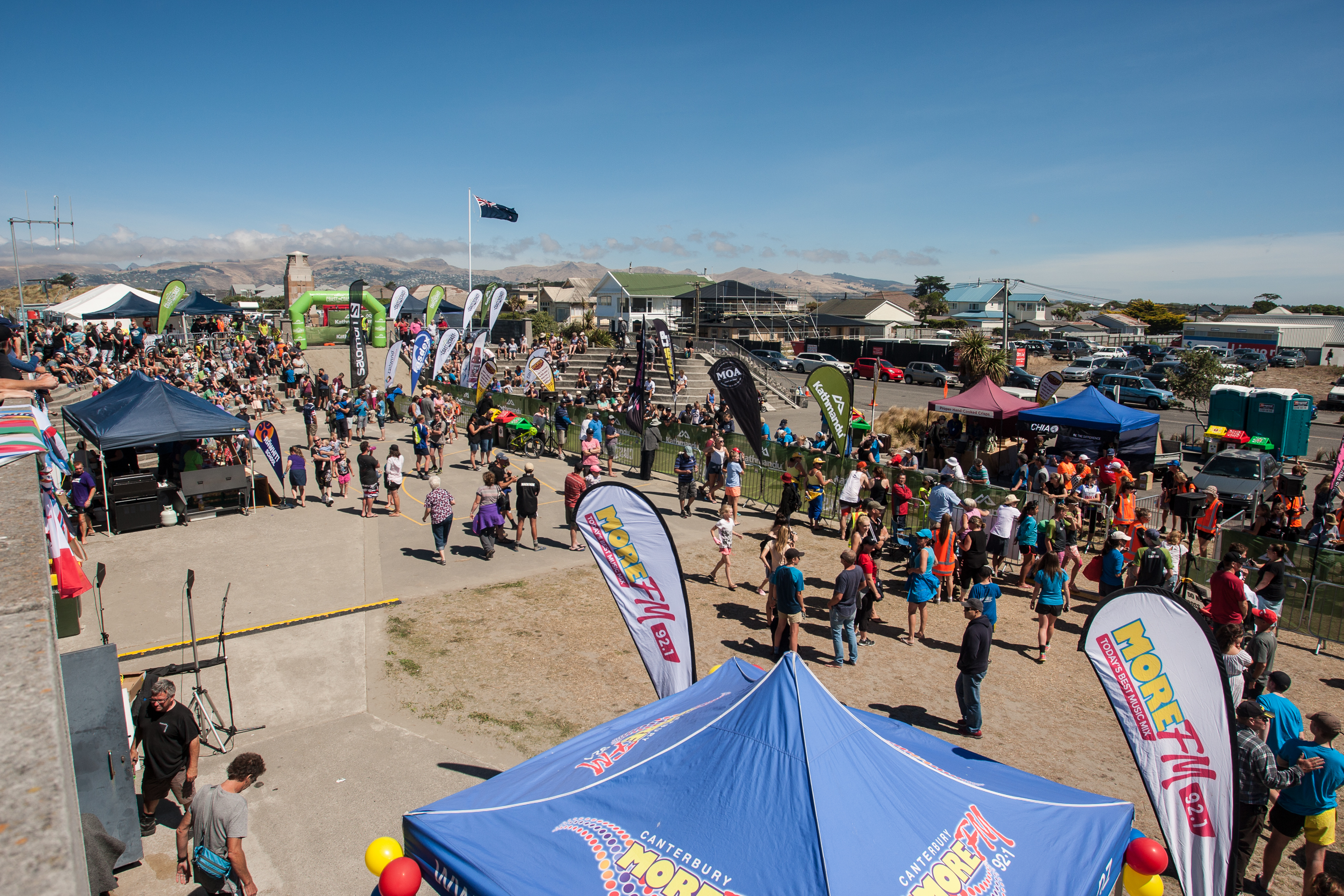
At the finish line of the 2017 Coast to Coast

The Coast to Coast is a non-standard multisport competition held annually in New Zealand. It is run from the west coast to the east coast of the South Island, and features running, cycling and kayaking elements over a total of 243 kilometres (151 mi). It starts in Kumara Beach and traditionally finished in the Christchurch suburb of Sumner, but since 2015 finishes in New Brighton. The event was created in 1983 by Christchurch personality Robin Judkins, who sold the rights to Queenstown-based tourism company Trojan Holdings in 2013. Richard Ussher took over from Judkins as race director in 2015. In 2019, Glen Currie was contracted to continue on from Richard Ussher in the role of race director.

== History ==
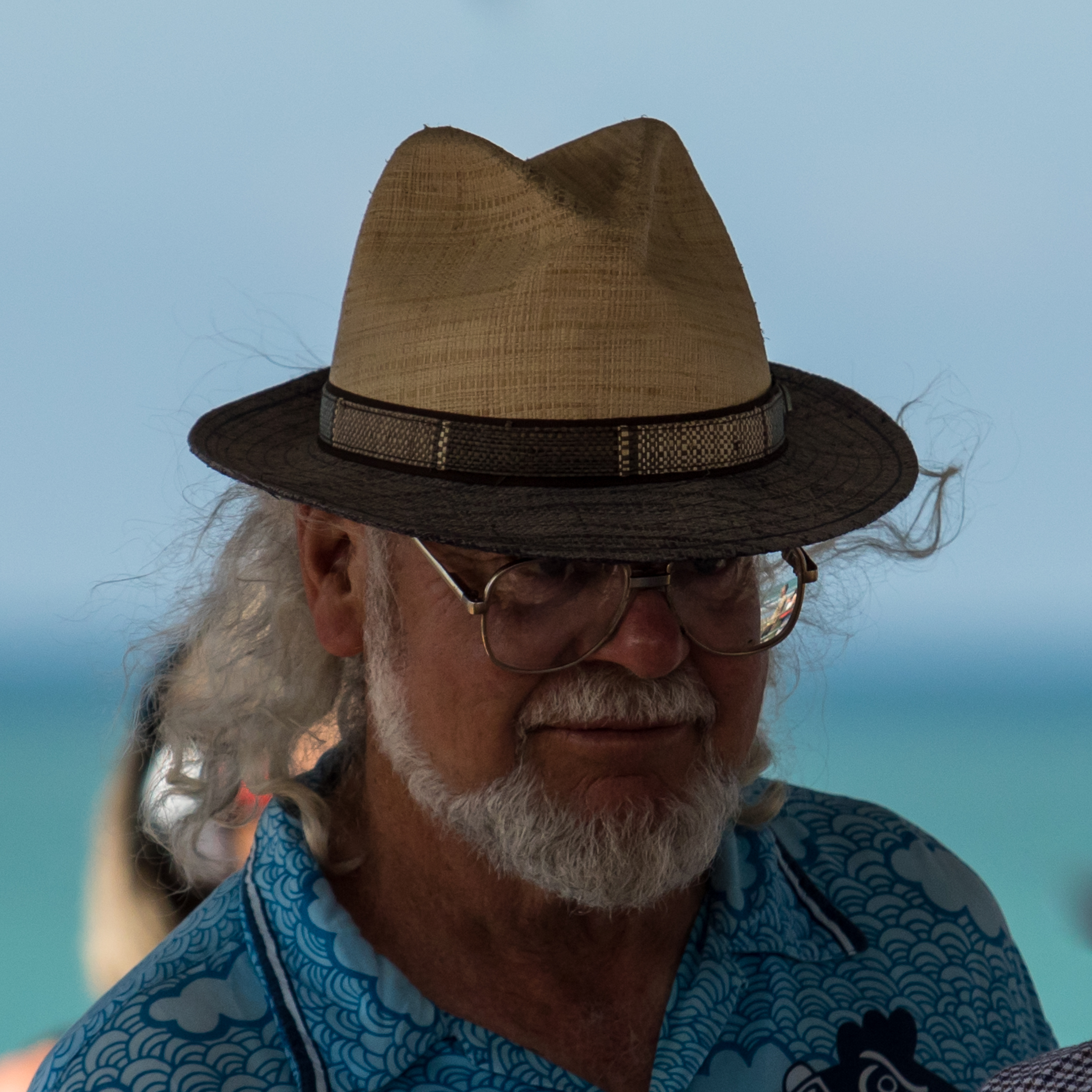
Robin Judkins in 2016

The first Coast to Coast race was organised in 1983 by New Zealand sportsman Robin Judkins who had already been organising the three-day Alpine Ironman. The original race featured only 79 competitors and was considered a largely local event. Initially a two-day event for individuals and teams, and one-day event for individuals was added in 1987 known as the "Longest Day". Over the years, the races have increased in size, and by the race's 25th anniversary run in 2007 the field had increased to 840 participants and gained international acclaim as one of the premier adventure races in the world. Unlike some other triathlon events, drafting is allowed.

At the pre-race briefing for the tenth race, Judkins made the following statement:

When I set out to do this event I had no idea it would ever grow to this size. It's really quite stunning and the sense of satisfaction is still as great for me as it was then. The fun that was the very first event has been in every other event since then. It's a bloody great event because everyone who goes in it seems to have such a good time, well that's the way it looks to me. I'm absolutely chuffed. I'm very proud of the event.

— Robin Judkins,

Richard Ussher, who had won the event five times, questioned prior to the 2013 event whether it was time for Judkins to step aside. After organising the race for 31 years, Judkins sold the rights in May 2013 to tourism company Trojan Holdings for an undisclosed amount. Judkins was the race director once more in 2014, but just days before that year's event, Trojan Holdings announced that they had appointed Richard Ussher as the race director, to take over from Judkins after February 2014.

Originally sponsored by NZ Breweries under their Steinlager brand in Christchurch, later transferred to their Dunedin brewery Speight's together held the naming rights for 32 years but cancelled its sponsorship in May 2015, with Moa Brewing as the event's new beer sponsor. There was no naming right sponsor for the 2016 race, but in April 2016, it was announced that Kathmandu was the new naming right sponsor from 2017 to 2019.

== Course ==
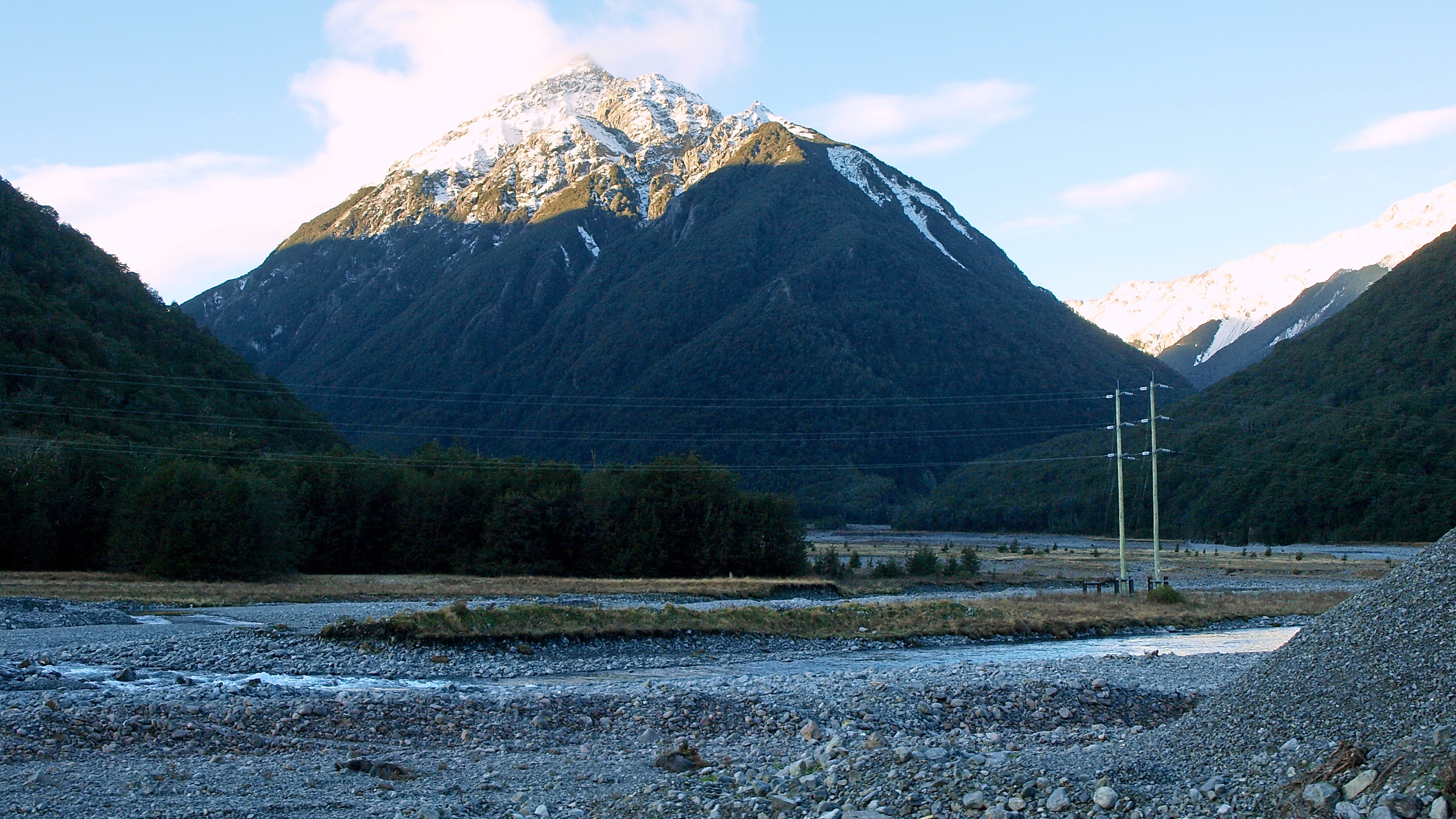
Confluence of the Bealey and Mingha Rivers

The race consists of three different timed events which all run over the same course: individual and two-person teams competing over a two-day event, and the titular World Championship race, a one-person, one-day event previously called The Longest Day competition.

The race begins with a 3 kilometres (1.9 mi) run from Kumara Beach on the Tasman Sea, followed by a 55 km (34 mi) cycling up State Highway 73 to Aickens. The next segment of the race is a 33 kilometres (21 mi) run up the Deception River, through Goat Pass and then down the Mingha River to the Bealey River and SH 73 at Klondyke Corner. For the two-day event, competitors overnight here.

From Klondyke Corner, a 15 kilometres (9.3 mi) cycling leg along SH 73 brings competitors to the Waimakariri River at Mount White Bridge. From here, competitors kayak 67 kilometres (42 mi) down the river to the Waimakariri Gorge Bridge (Route 72).

Until 2014, the final segment was a 70 kilometres (43 mi) cycling race along Old West Coast Road and through Christchurch (via SH 73, SH 76, SH 74A, Ferry Road and Main Road) to the finish at Sumner Beach, on the Pacific Ocean.

From 2015, the route was shifted north of the Waimakariri River to follow South Eyre Road, then travelling through north-eastern Christchurch to finish at New Brighton beach, a total distance just 500 metres shorter than the original. The main reason for the change was to avoid competitors contending with numerous traffic lights through Christchurch's inner suburbs.

- Start line, Kumara beach: 42.5725°S 171.1157°E
- Kumara Junction transition (run-cycle): 42.5881°S 171.1319°E
- Aickins transition (cycle-run): 42.7714°S 171.6253°E
- Klondyke Corner transition/overnight (run-cycle): 43.0040°S 171.5894°E
- Mount White Bridge transition (cycle-kayak): 43.0045°S 171.7479°E
- Waimakariri Gorge Bridge transition (kayak-cycle): 43.3606°S 172.0507°E
- Finish line, New Brighton Beach: 43.51423°S 172.73482°E

- Historic finish line, Sumner beach: 43.5663°S 172.7594°E

== Individual races ==
=== 1983 race ===
The inaugural race was held on 26 and 27 February, a Saturday and Sunday. There were a total of 79 competitor, of whom 77 finished the race. In the individual race, 49 competitors made it to the finish line, and 28 competitors finished in the two-person event. The race was initially only available over two days. Three competitors attended from overseas: Dave Horning was a triathlete from the United States, Tom Barichello was from Canada, and the eventual race winner in the individual men's category was English anaesthetist Joe Sherriff, who was temporarily living in Dunedin. Due to the staggered starts on the second morning, Graeme Dingle was leading Sherriff, but Sherriff would have had to cross the finish line two minutes ahead of Dingle to compensate for the staggered start. Sherriff caught the first glimpse of Dingle just outside Ferrymead and as he was riding with a strong bunch, he managed to take 4 minutes 30 seconds off Dingle, enough for a win. Of the women, Stella Sweney from Nelson won decisively, over two and a half hours ahead of Annie Hope coming in second. Sweney would win more than just her first race. The main sponsor for the event was Macpac, and Steinlager was a co-sponsor – their contribution was 20 dozen cans of beer.

=== 1984 race ===
There were 139 competitors for the second event. The inaugural race received little media attention, but this changed in 1984 with James Daniels from the 3ZM radio station in Christchurch competing in the event. Daniels would stop every now and then and provide live commentary. And there was lots to talk about, as the weather was atrocious. Climbing up the Deception River, the weather deteriorated. Competitors who were slower faced ever higher water levels and could not undertake the many river crossings by themselves, but had to wait for others to link arms. The temperature at Goat Pass was 4 degrees Celsius. Despite the conditions, John Howard finished the first day 10 minutes faster than the 1983 winner's time; Howard had missed the event the previous year as he wanted to save himself for a major triathlon a week later in the United States (which, due to an administrative bungle, he could not get to).

On the second day, a southerly had come through and the Waimakariri River was in flood; eleven competitors pulled out in this section, rescued by helicopter or jet boat, or simply giving up before entering the gorge. Howard had been the race favourite and at the end of the second day, he had knocked 90 minutes off Sherriff's winning time from last year for a clear win of the men's competition. Sherriff had travelled from England to try for another win (and to marry his fiancée), but came a disappointing 18th place. Stella Sweney once more won the women's race. The main sponsor for the 1984 race was brewer Lion Brown.

=== 1985 race ===
In the third year, there were 321 competitors, and the race was held on 2 and 3 February. Based on the high number of competitors who had to be rescued of the kayaking section, Judkins made it compulsory that competitors had proficiency in kayaking; either a certificate from a canoe club, surf lifesaving club, or another canoeist stating that they are a competent grade two to three paddler. It was the first time that a significant number of North Island entries were received. It was raining heavily in the mountains when the race started. The first cycling leg is remembered for a bunch of six riders encountering about 30 sheep that dashed onto the road. Dave Horning, the American who had competed in the first race, had again come to New Zealand. He described his experience running the flooded Deception River section thus:

One moment we would be splashing upstream in ankle-deep water, and the next we would be in over our heads. They should have called this section the swimming leg. It often took a team effort to make the more treacherous river crossings. Joining hands, groups of athletes cautiously forded the swift-flowing river.

— Dave Horning,

Terry Newlands had the men's individual fastest time on the first day, but he was ill-prepared for the kayaking section. The Aucklander had brought a surf ski and had tested it on the lower Waimakariri River before the race. The conditions on the upper Waimakariri were vastly different on race day, and wearing shorts, Newlands pulled out of the race suffering from hypothermia before entering the gorge. Horning also pulled out, unable to cope with kayaking the swollen river. Brian Sander, a science technician from Wellington, won the men's individual race, 26 seconds ahead of Greg Dobson. Sandy Fletcher won the individual women's event, with Tui Elliot second and the previous winner, Stella Sweney, in third place. Fletcher had been registered for the 1984 race in a team, but had to pull out before the race due to injury; she supported her husband Bernie Fletcher instead, helping him to win the men's team category. The Fletchers had for years lived in Britain and raced in kayaking events, including at world championships. Sandy Fletcher had come fourth in the first New Zealand national road cycling championships. The 1985 Coast to Coast was the only one that she would ever enter.

Last year's individual men's winner, John Howard, had entered the team event with Eric Saggers. Ten days before the race, he had suffered a high-speed downhill crash and turned up to the race briefing "bandaged like a mummy" after having lost a lot of skin. They won the team event. The main sponsor for the 1985 race was, like the previous year, the brewer Lion Brown.

=== 1986 race ===
In 1986, there were 347 competitors, including quite a number of athletes from overseas. Unlike the previous two years, the weather was fine. The character of the race had changed, and having the right gear became a much more important component. Greg Dobson was the first athlete, in 1986, to get sponsorship, and he took five months off work to train for the event. Local radio stations gave progress updates and 3,000 spectators gathered at Sumner beach to see the competitors come in. Steinlager as the main sponsor had enabled scaffolding to be erected with a large banner at the finish line. Greg Dobson was the first individual man across the line, and he won the event; the first to break the 12-hour mark. Brian Sanders came second; the two had swapped places compared to 1985. Jane Reeves, a radiographer from Christchurch, won the individual women's event; she had been leading her category from the start of the race.

=== 1987 race ===
The 1987 event was held on 7 and 8 February. New Zealand Breweries was the main sponsor, and they promoted their brand Steinlager through the race. The two-day event was entered by 143 individuals and 62 two-person teams. The two-day race has long been remembered for the crash involving 20 cyclists some 20 kilometres (12 mi) into the race. 1982 Commonwealth Games gold medallist cyclist Craig Adair, who was establishing himself as a bike show owner at the time, was the event mechanic and he got cleaned out of spare parts by the crash. Terry Newlands from Auckland lost one of the sole from his shoes with an hour to go on the mountain run, and this slowed him down, but owing to a strong performance on the river, he won the men's two-day event. The fastest woman was Penny Webster, a teacher from Queenstown.

But what made the 1987 remarkable was the introduction of the "Longest Day"; the option for individual athletes to complete the event during a single day. There were 42 competitors who signed up: 40 men and 2 women. It was a gamble, as it was unknown whether humans could sustain the difficult conditions. There were other events that took a whole day to complete, most notably the Ironman World Championship that had been held on Hawaii since 1978, but none of these included such difficult conditions. Doctors were thus placed at the end of the mountain run, checking that the competitors were in a state that would allow them to continue, and none were pulled out of the field by the medical profession. The two women who entered had both previously won the two-day event: Stella Sweney in 1983 and 1984, and Jane Reeves in 1986. Reeves pulled out of the race in the kayaking section, and Sweney and her brother John stopped to rescue Reeves' kayak. The Sweney siblings were the last one-day competitors to cross the line in Sumner, but Stella Sweney added a third event title to her collection.

Of the Longest Day men, Eric Saggers was the first to finish the first bike section. He needed a good lead on Russell Prince, who was considered the stronger mountain runner, and Saggers had a lead of 2 min 29 sec. Prince overtook him up the Deception River close to Goat Pass and never saw another competitor. At Sumner, Prince had a 16-minute lead over John McKenzie, with a University of Canterbury student in third place – Steve Gurney. Saggers came fifth.

Russell Prince had, literally, first come across the event in 1984. The heavy rain had forced him and his brothers out from a hunting trip at the headwaters of the Waimakariri River. Arriving back at the main road at Klondyke Corner, they saw a congregation of people and thought it must have been a large search and rescue party; they went over to offer their help. But they had walked into the overnight camp at the end of the mountain run, and one of the competitors explained to Prince what the event involved. Intrigued, Prince decided to participate the following year. Prince came fifth in 1985, third in 1986, before winning the inaugural Longest Day in 1987.

=== 1988 race ===
For the 1988 race, Judkins had set a limit of 400 competitors. He took delight in opening registrations in June of each year for the following event, and the places were snapped up within days. It was the first time that the event had sold out. New Zealand Breweries was again the main sponsor, and they promoted their brand Steinlager. For the first time, Judkins had celebrity entrants, with two former All Blacks putting their name forward: Brian Ford and Kevin Eveleigh. John Jacoby entered the Longest Day after having come second in the 1987 team event with fellow Australian Andrew Maffett, who in 1988 was his support person. Jacoby had won the three previous World Cup canoe marathons and was thus a top contender. Greg Dobson, the Longest Day race leader, was five minutes ahead of Jacoby entering the river. By the time they left the river, however, Jacoby held a 14-minute lead over Steve Gurney, who had overtaken Dobson. Jacoby maintained this lead to Sumner, finishing in 12:02:59. He narrowly missed out on winning a NZ$35,000 Ford Laser TX3 Turbo, which was the price for the first competitor to break the 12-hour mark. Jacoby was slowed down by an easterly wind that became stronger during the day. In July 1988, Jacoby won the inaugural ICF Canoe Marathon World Championships.

There was only one woman competing in the Longest Day, and she was there only because Judkins had talked her into it. Denise Higgison from Tauranga was the last individual to finish the Longest Day in a time of 17:22:08 hours, but this secured her the win in her category.

The two-day individual women's race was a competition between the 1987 winner, Penny Webster, and Claire Parkes. The deciding factor was a bad crash on her bike that cost Webster seven minutes, but that also injured her and reduced her performance. In the end, Parkes won 48 minutes ahead of Webster, who came in third place. The individual men's two-day event was won by Darryl Forsyth. Greg Coyle came last in the individual two-day event, with just over 23 hours, but for him, the important thing was to have done the race. He commented later:

I sometimes go to the Cave Rock Hotel in Sumner. You're virtually a leper if you haven't done it. No one will talk to you, you've got nothing to talk about. It's as if you smell because you haven't done the Coast to Coast – it's like stigma. If you have, then it's like belonging to a funny kind of élite.

— Greg Coyle,

=== 1989 race ===
A few things were new for the 1989, and some of them caused a furore. First of all, the New Zealand Tourism Department—a government agency—became involved as they recognised the potential for event tourism. They organised and funded foreign journalists to come and cover the event. One of those was English botanist David Bellamy, who did not just report from the event, but decided to compete. Another innovation was drug testing; this was Judkins' ploy to have the race known as the "World Championship of Kayak, Cycle, Run". In the end, it was the only event where drug testing was carried out, only the first three men of the Longest Day were required to give urine samples, and the samples were sent to Christchurch Hospital for testing of stimulants, rather than Canada for testing for anabolic steroids as previously announced. Gurney and Prince, who had lobbied for drug testing, were critical of the scaled-back testing regime and claimed that some competitors were using steroids. But the real controversy was caused by the sponsorship: New Zealand Breweries had decided to promote their South Island brand Speight's, and it was their sexist slogan that caused the outcry: "The stuff Southern Men are made of." Female competitors hissed and booed, and there was much discussion in the media, and media attention always pleased Judkins. People made their views known by slogans on the support vehicles. Gurney threatened to wear a dress if he managed to win the Longest Day. The brewery simply responded that their main target audience was men.

In the women's Longest Day event, Claire Parkes defeated Penny Webster. They had been neck to neck until the kayak section, where Webster pulled away. Three competitors were well clear of the rest of the field in the men's Longest Day event; at the transition to the kayak, Prince had seven minutes on Gurney, who in turn had one minute on Jacoby. The latter shone in his specialist kayaking discipline and when leaving the river had a lead of four minutes on Gurney, and eighteen minutes on Prince. On the last cycling leg, Jacoby could even increase his lead, and he finished in 11:27:19 hours. Gurney and Prince also broke the 12-hour mark, but Jacoby had won the car (that year, a Suzuki was up for grabs) and a return trip to London. Gurney thus missed out on his chance to wear a dress during the prize-giving.

In the men's individual two-day category, Doug Lomax won the race. Lomax had been motivated to do well by somebody calling him fat, and he had slimmed down from 96 kilograms (15.1 st) to 80 kilograms (13 st) prior to the race. But in either case, this was just a test-run prior to the 1990 competition, where he intended to contest the Longest Day in the veteran's category, as he would have turned 40 by then. The individual women's category was won by Vivienne Prince, the wife of Russell Prince.

=== 2022 race ===
In early December 2021, the New Zealand Government introduced the COVID-19 Protection Framework, which set the level of restrictions needed. On 23 January 2022, the country moved to the red phase. Under those restrictions, it was not possible to run the two-day Coast to Coast event and it was cancelled. The race was scheduled for 11 and 12 February 2022 (Friday and Saturday), and the one-day event on that Saturday was confirmed by event organisers to go ahead on 24 January 2022.

Braden Currie only registered for the race two days before it started and beat the previous year's winner, Dougal Allan, by over 20 minutes. Simone Maier won the women's race on her birthday, with Elina Ussher coming second. Due to high water levels, the kayaking route on the Waimakariri River was moved downstream and finishing at the Main North Road bridge, making the second bike ride (from Klondyke Corner) much longer (112 kilometres or 70 miles instead of 17 kilometres or 11 miles), and the final bike ride into New Brighton much shorter at 12 kilometres or 7.5 miles.

=== 2023 race ===
The 2023 race was held on 10 and 11 February, with the longest day on the latter date. In the women's one-day race, the defending champion Simone Maier took the lead soon after the mountain run. She won the race for the fourth time and she indicated that this may have been her last Coast to Coast participation. In the men's one-day race, Sam Manson won for the first time in his eleventh time competing for the title.

The men's two-day tandem race was entered by former rugby player Richie McCaw and Olympic rower Nathan Cohen as a team, and their participation received much media coverage. They were in the lead after the first day and held the lead to the finish line. Calum Sutherland and Estelle Arundell won the men's and women's two-day individual race.

== Race results ==
The following race results are for individuals competing either in the two-day (since 1983) or one-day ("Longest Day"; since 1987) event.

=== Two-day results ===
Year	Men			Women		
Year	Competitor	Residence	Time	Competitor	Residence	Time
1983	Joe Sherriff	Dunedin (Note: Sherriff is an English anaesthetist from the Lake District, but was at that time temporarily working in Dunedin.)	14:11.42	Stella Sweney	Nelson	17:13.37
1984	John Howard	Christchurch	12:31.35	Stella Sweney	Nelson	15:50.57
1985	Brian Sanders	Wellington	12:26.23	Sandra "Sandy" Fletcher	Urenui	13:20.47
1986	Greg Dobson	Cust	11:55.34	Jane Reeves	Christchurch	14:01.54
1987	Terry Newlands	Auckland	12:02.08	Penny Webster	Queenstown	13:57.54
1988	Darryl Forsyth	Christchurch	12:28.22	Claire Parkes	Nelson	13:36.17
1989	Doug Lomax	Christchurch	12:17.52	Vivienne Prince	Christchurch	14:02.27
1990	Andy MacBeth	Hokitika or Christchurch	11:51.06	Linda Wensley	Marlborough	13:32.53
1991	Doug Lomax	Christchurch	11:54:37	Tania Pearce	Raumati	13:06.26
1992†	Keith Murray	Christchurch	9:22.36			
1993	Keith Murray	Christchurch	11:05.18			
1994	Glen McNeilly	Christchurch	11:08.51			
1995	Glen McNeilly	Christchurch	11:20.17			
1996	Michael Causer	Christchurch	11:30.21			
1997	Richard Brunton	Christchurch	11:37.34			
1998	Tim Pearson	Christchurch	11:43.09			
1999	Simon Yarrell	Christchurch	11:47.18			
2000	Jeff Mitchell	Christchurch	11:34.22			
2001	Robin Wilson	Christchurch	11:43.19			
2002	Gary Fahey	Timaru	12:14.55			
2003	Jason Gerrie	Nelson	11:56.57			
2004	Robert Loveridge	Christchurch	11:41.37			
2005	Luke Vaughan	Christchurch	11:41.16			
2006	Benje Patterson	Invercargill	11:39.45			
2007	Steven McKinstry	Christchurch	11:50.22			
2008	Dougal Allan	Foxton	12:10.21			
2009	Sam Clark	Whakatane	12:24.53			
2010†	Adam Milne	Christchurch	11:05.12			
2011	James Coubrough	Lower Hutt	11:25.02			
2012	Nathan Jones	Woodend	12:20.00	Toni Keeling	?	?
2013	Seamus Meikle	Greymouth	11:50.50			
2014	Brendon Vercoe	Christchurch	12:49.25	Fiona Dowling	Wellington	13:57.14
2015	Kevin O'Donnell	Hokitika	12:12.05	Olivia Spencer-Bower	Christchurch	14:24.41
2016	Hayden Wilde	Whakatane	12:18.47	Anna Barrett	Mount Maunganui	13:45.02
2017	Hamish Elliott	Gore	12:58.09	Kathryn Bunckenburg	Wellington	14:10.58
2018	Oliver Thompson	Whakatane	12:21.28	Jennifer Walker	?	13:12.01
2019	Lachie Brownlie	Nelson	12:41.15	Selena Metherell	?	14:28.01
2020	Bevan Jones	Christchurch	11:25.01	Courtney Prestage		12:57.38
2021	Rob Lord	Rolleston	12:20.20	Emma Wilson		13:26.54
2022	Two-day event cancelled					
2023	Calum Sutherland	New Plymouth	11:58.21	Estelle Arundell	Dunedin	13:33.12
2024	Finn McKenzie	Marlborough	11:39.51	Sonja Vreugdenhil	Methven	13:49.11
2025	Sam King		11:57:49	Emily Trevail	United Kingdom	13:14:27

Table footnotes

† the events were not contested on the standard course due to bad weather

=== Longest Day results ===
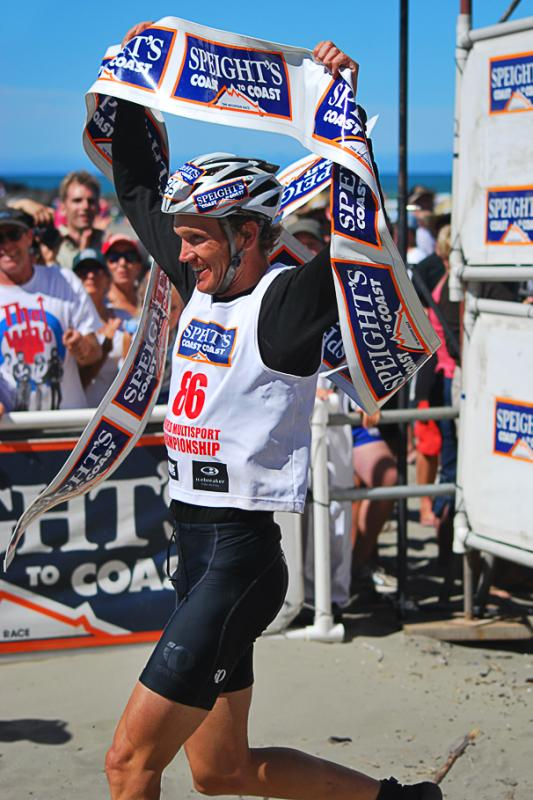
Gordon Walker winning the 2010 Longest Day event

Individual winners of the single-day, dubbed Longest Day, event are as follows:

Year	Men			Women		
Year	Competitor	Residence	Time	Competitor	Residence	Time
1987	Russell Prince	Christchurch	12:19:51	Stella Sweney	Nelson	16:07:10
1988	John Jacoby	Melbourne, Australia	12:02:59	Denise Higgison	Tauranga	17:22:08
1989	John Jacoby	Melbourne, Australia	11:27:19	Claire Parkes	?	13:11:10
1990	Steve Gurney	Christchurch	11:06:49	Anna Keeling	Christchurch	13:39:01
1991	Steve Gurney	Christchurch	10:56:14	Kathy Lynch	Motueka	12:46:04
1992†	Rockley Montgomery	South Africa	08:37:30	Kathy Lynch	Motueka	09:29:36
1993	John Jacoby	Melbourne, Australia	11:06:02	Kathy Lynch	Motueka	12:41:52
1994	Keith Murray	Christchurch	10:34:37	Kathy Lynch	Motueka	12:38:31
1995	Ian Edmond	Christchurch	11:44:22	Wendy Nelson	Geraldine	13:17:14
1996	Neil Jones	Whakatane	11:49:39	Kathy Lynch	Motueka	13:16:58
1997	Steve Gurney	Christchurch	10:55:16	Andrea Murray	Christchurch	12:09:26
1998	Steve Gurney	Christchurch	11:30:09	Alexandra Stewart	Wellington	13:50:34
1999	Steve Gurney	Christchurch	11:34:21	Kate Callaghan	Auckland	13:17:58
2000	Steve Gurney	Christchurch	11:47:32	Jill Westenra	Wellington	13:16:25
2001	Steve Gurney	Christchurch	11:04:58	Jill Westenra	Wellington	12:46:35
2002	Steve Gurney	Christchurch	11:53:08	Jill Westenra	Wellington	13:25:34
2003	Steve Gurney	Christchurch	11:14:08	Jill Westenra	Wellington	12:25:54
2004	George Christison	Napier	11:33:30	Kristina Strode-Penny	Christchurch	13:08:43
2005	Richard Ussher	Nelson	11:44:07	Kristina Anglem	Christchurch	12:40:34
2006	Richard Ussher	Nelson	11:05:06	Emily Miazga	Canada	13:00:15
2007	Gordon Walker	Auckland	11:39:30	Fleur Pawsey	Wellington	13:29:47
2008	Richard Ussher	Nelson	11:03:52	Emily Miazga	Canada	13:16:24
2009	Gordon Walker	Auckland	11:49:26	Emily Miazga	Canada	13:39:33
2010†	Gordon Walker	Auckland	09:43:24	Elina Ussher	Finland	10:59:54
2011	Richard Ussher	Nelson	10:41:12	Sophie Hart	Nelson	12:10:31
2012	Richard Ussher	Nelson	11:33:24	Elina Ussher	Finland	13:25:24
2013	Braden Currie	Methven	11:06:51	Sophie Hart	Nelson	12:36:19
2014	Braden Currie	Wānaka	11:18:37	Jess Simson	Wellington	13:12:24
2014	Braden Currie	Wānaka	11:20:46	Jess Simson	Wellington	13:05:10
2015	Braden Currie	Wānaka	11:27:46	Jess Simson	Wānaka	13:05:44
2016	Sam Clark	Whakatane	11:37:07	Elina Ussher	Finland	13:32:41
2017	Sam Clark	Whakatane	11:02:43	Elina Ussher		13:11:39
2018	Sam Clark	Whakatane	11:14.33	Robyn Owen	South Africa	12:44.56
2019	Dougal Allan	Wānaka	11:15.00	Simone Maier	Christchurch	12:56.36
2020	Sam Clark	Whakatane	10:45:01	Corrinne O'Donnell	Whakatane	12:53.39
2021	Dougal Allan	Wānaka	11:09.52	Simone Maier	Wānaka	12:34.49
2022	Braden Currie	Wānaka	9:45:23	Simone Maier	Wānaka	11:52:18
2023	Sam Manson	Christchurch	11:40:15	Simone Maier	Wānaka	13:11:18
2024	Hamish Elliott	Wānaka	10:48:53	Simone Maier	Wānaka	12:31:08
2025	Alex Hunt	Hobart, Australia	11:29:20	Deborah Lynch	Porirua	13:06:11

Table footnotes

† the events were not contested on the standard course due to bad weather

== Records ==
The record time of completion of the race is in 10 hours, 34 minutes and 37 seconds, achieved by Keith Murray in 1994. Murray also holds the record for the two-day competition at 11:05:18 from the year before in 1993.

Event	Time	Participant	Year
Men's Individual (One day)	10:34:37	Keith Murray	1994
Women's Individual (One day)	12:09:26	Andrea Murray	1997
Men's Individual (Two day)	11:05:18	Keith Murray	1993
Women's Individual (Two day)	12:59:57	Anne Woodley	1997
Men's Teams	10:50:56	Michael Causer; Graham Causer	1993
Women's Teams	12:37:53	Suzanne Stowell; Andrea Devine	1994

Steve Gurney, a local from Christchurch, has won the event a record nine times, in 1990, 1991, and 1997–2003. Of the women, Kathy Lynch is the record holder with five wins between 1991 and 1996, which was equalled by Simone Maier in 2024. Elina Ussher, with four wins to her name, was keen to equal Lynch's five wins in 2018 but came fourth. Maier wanted to eclipse Kathy Lynch's record in the 2025 race, but she was beaten by Deborah Lynch and had to settle for second place.
