= Anton Cooper =

New Zealand cyclist

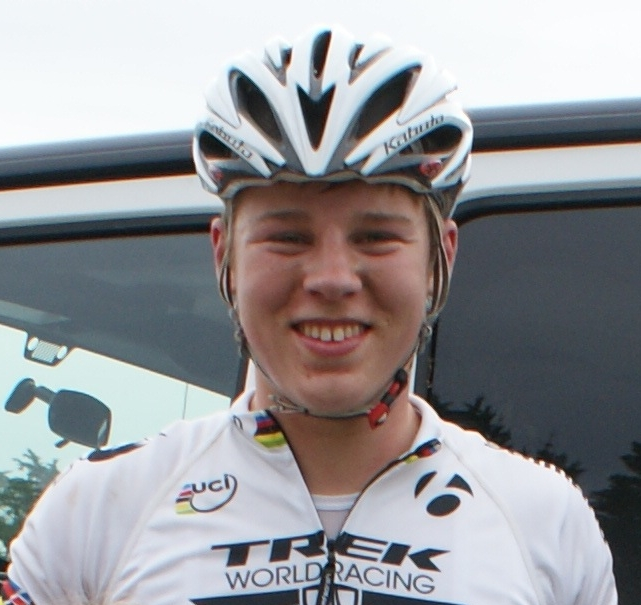
- Anton Cooper at the McLeans Island 12 Hour Day/Nighter, October 2012

Personal information
- Full name: Anton Cooper
- Born: 11 August 1994 (age 32)

Cycling career
- Sport: Cycling
- Discipline: Mountain bike racing
- Rider type: Cross-country

Professional teams
- 2012: Trek World Racing
- 2013–: Cannondale Factory Racing
Medal record
Men's mountain bike racing
Representing New Zealand
Commonwealth Games
Gold medal – first place	2014 Glasgow	Cross-country
World Championships
Gold medal – first place	2015 Vallnord	Under-23 cross-country
Gold medal – first place	2012 Leogang	Junior cross-country
Silver medal – second place	2011 Champéry	Junior cross-country

Anton Cooper (born 11 August 1994) is a New Zealand cross-country cyclist who races for the Trek Factory Racing XC Team. He is the 2015 World Under 23 Cross-country Mountain bike champion and the 2012 World Junior Cross-country Mountain bike champion. One of the two contenders for the country's 2016 Summer Olympics quota spot, he developed chronic fatigue earlier in 2016 and the nomination went to Sam Gaze instead. Cooper represented New Zealand at the 2020 Summer Olympics in Tokyo, finishing sixth in the Men's Cross-country Mountain Bike final.

== Early life and education ==
Cooper is from Woodend, a town in the Waimakariri District 26 kilometres (16 mi) north of Christchurch. His parents are Paul and Laila Cooper, and he has several sisters. He received his education at Christchurch Boys' High School and he graduated in 2012. He has since moved to the Christchurch hill suburb Westmorland, not far from the Christchurch Adventure Park.

== Cycling career ==
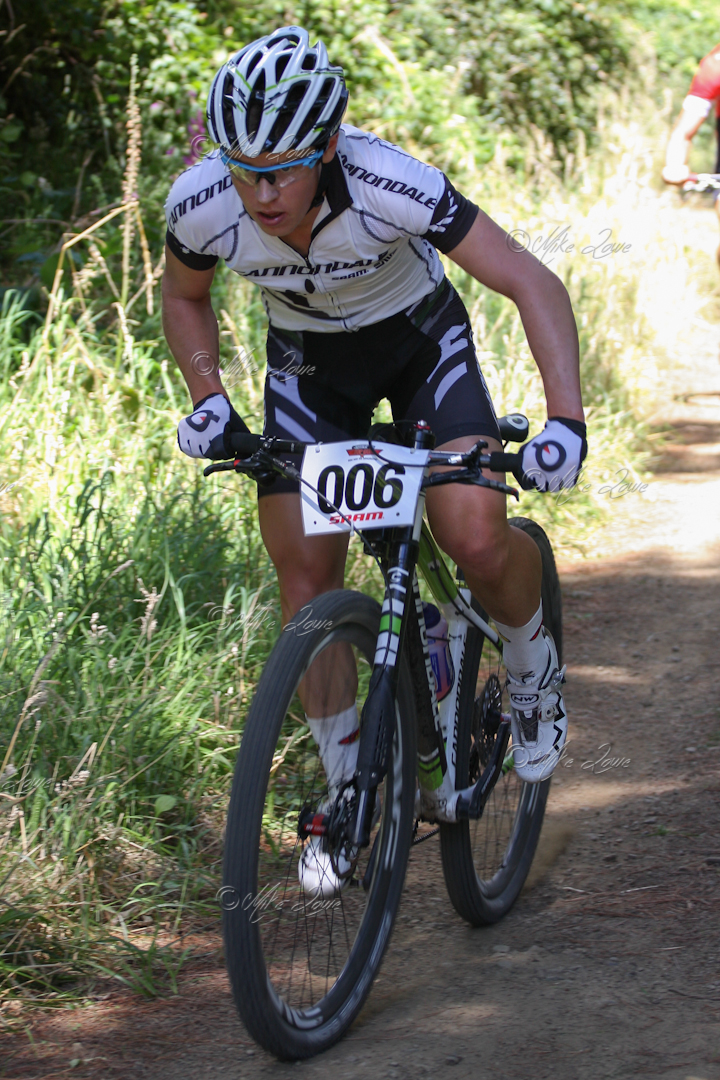
Cooper in February 2014

Cooper started racing aged 11, encouraged by his father. Apart from cross country riding, he enjoys cross country running and tennis. Among other riders, he admires Julien Absalon and Nino Schurter, and among other athletes, he looks up to former rugby union player Richie McCaw, cricketer Brendon McCullum, and rowers Hamish Bond and Eric Murray. Before receiving professional sponsorship, he was discovered as a strong talent by Christchurch adventure racers Steve Moffatt and Steve Gurney, who organised financial support from various business people.

As a 16-year-old, he surprised by winning the 2011 Karapoti Classic in Upper Hutt. When the February 2011 Christchurch earthquake hit, his competition bike got stuck in a bike shop and he had to compete at the nationals on an old training bike. Significant wins in his career as an amateur include winning silver at the World mountain bike championships in Champéry, Switzerland in 2011, and winning gold in the 2012 World mountain bike championships in Saalfelden, Austria. Cooper is the first New Zealander who won a world championship in cross country cycling, and it was his last race before he turned professional. He then won gold at the 2014 Commonwealth Games in Glasgow, Scotland, a race in which Sam Gaze from Rotorua, New Zealand, won silver, making it the first gold–silver win for New Zealand at the Commonwealth Games. Cooper then became Under 23 Cross-country world champion at the 2015 World mountain bike championships in Andorra.

In December 2011, Cooper signed a sponsorship contract with the Trek Bicycle Corporation for 12 months. Trek decided to focus on downhill racing and Cooper signed a contract with the Cannondale Bicycle Corporation in December 2012 for 24 months.

Rules set by the Union Cycliste Internationale (UCI), the world governing body for sports cycling, stipulate that mountain bikers must be at least 19 years old in the year Olympic Games are held to be allowed to compete. Cooper was outside of that requirement by eight months for the 2012 Summer Olympics in London. BikeNZ, New Zealand's national governing body of cycle racing, sought a dispensation for Cooper but this was declined. New Zealand was given one quota place for a male mountain biker for the 2016 Summer Olympics in Rio de Janeiro, Brazil, with the general expectation that either Gaze or Cooper will be chosen. Cooper's 2016 World Cup races were upset by him developing chronic fatigue, with him first recognising symptoms in February 2016. In June 2016, the Rio selection was thus awarded to Gaze, and it caused Cooper some "really dark weeks". Cooper suspended his 2016 campaign and returned home to New Zealand from his Northern Hemisphere summer base in Germany. In August, he underwent surgery on adenoids that are giving him problems. Ahead of the 2017 national championships, he lost access to his bike once more as he had been evacuated from his Westmorland home due to the 2017 Port Hills fires, but Police let him through the cordon to retrieve all he needed to travel to the competition.

== Major results ==
2011
UCI Junior XCO World Cup

1st Nové Město
1st Val di Sole

1st Karapoti Classic
2nd Cross-country, UCI World Junior Championships
2012
1st Cross-country, UCI World Junior Championships
UCI Junior XCO World Cup

1st Pietermaritzburg
1st Mont-Sainte-Anne
1st Windham

2013
1st Cross-country, National Championships
1st Cross-country, Oceania Under-23 Championships
UCI Junior XCO World Cup

1st Mont-Sainte-Anne
2nd Hafjell

2014
1st Cross-country, Commonwealth Games
2015
1st Cross-country, National Championships
1st Cross-country, UCI World Under-23 Championships
2016
1st Cross-country, Oceania Championships
2nd Cross-country, National Championships
2017
1st Cross-country, Oceania Championships
National Championships

1st Cross-country
1st Eliminator

Swiss Bike Cup

1st Gränichen

UCI XCO World Cup

3rd Albstadt

2018
1st Cross-country, Oceania Championships
1st Cross-country, National Championships
2nd Cross-country, Commonwealth Games
UCI XCO World Cup

2nd Nové Město

2019
1st Cross-country, Oceania Championships
1st Cross-country, National Championships
Copa Catalana Internacional

1st Banyoles

Swiss Bike Cup

2nd Andermatt

2020
1st Cross-country, Oceania Championships
1st Cross-country, National Championships
1st Rund um den Roadlberg
Swiss Bike Cup

2nd Gstaad

2021
1st Cross-country, National Championships
Swiss Bike Cup

1st Gränichen

UCI XCO World Cup

3rd Leogang

2022
1st Cross-country, Oceania Championships
1st Cross-country, National Championships
Swiss Bike Cup

3rd Basel

2023
Swiss Bike Cup

1st Basel
