= Amos Judkins House =

Historic house in Massachusetts, United States

- U.S. National Register of Historic Places
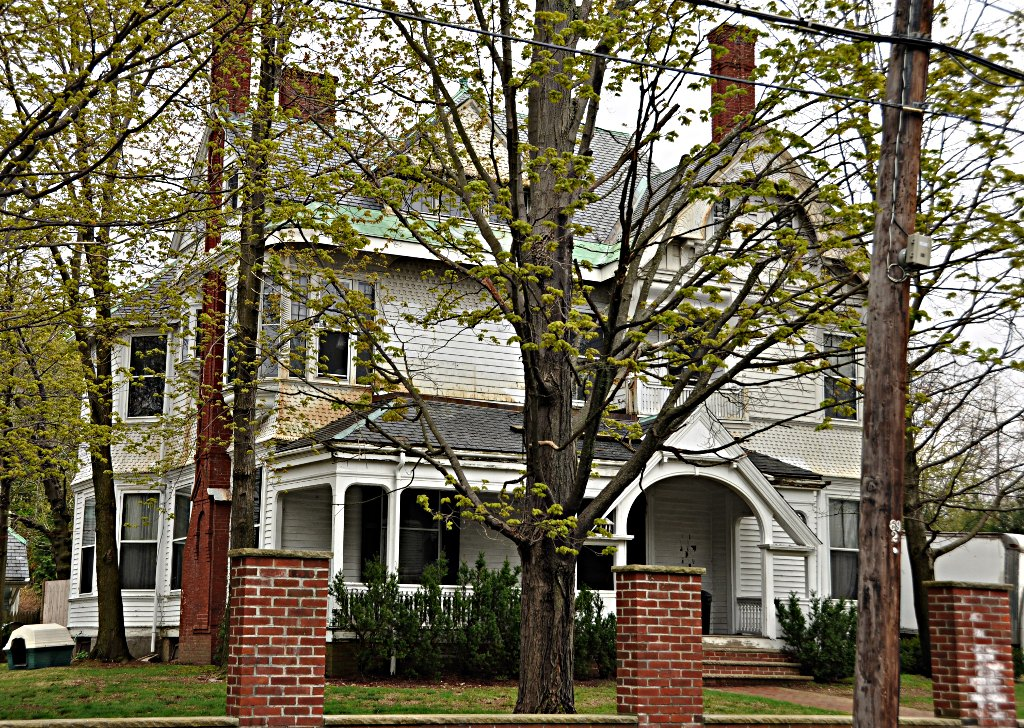

- Location within Massachusetts Location within the United States
- Location: 8 Central Ave., Newton, Massachusetts
- Coordinates: 42°21′22″N 71°12′23″W
- Built: 1884
- Architectural style: Queen Anne
- MPS: Newton MRA
- NRHP reference No.: 86001846
- Added to NRHP: September 04, 1986

The Amos Judkins House is a historic house at 8 Central Avenue in Newton, Massachusetts. The 2 1/2-story wood-frame house was built c. 1884, and is an excellent and well-preserved example of Queen Anne styling. It has asymmetrical massing, and a variety of gables, projections, and recessed areas that add variety to its external appearance. The exterior is clad in part in clapboards, and in part with decoratively cut wood shingles. The focal point of the front porch is a gable-topped arch.

The house was listed on the National Register of Historic Places in 1986.

== See also ==
- National Register of Historic Places listings in Newton, Massachusetts
