= Steve Gurney =

New Zealand athlete

Steve Gurney MNZM
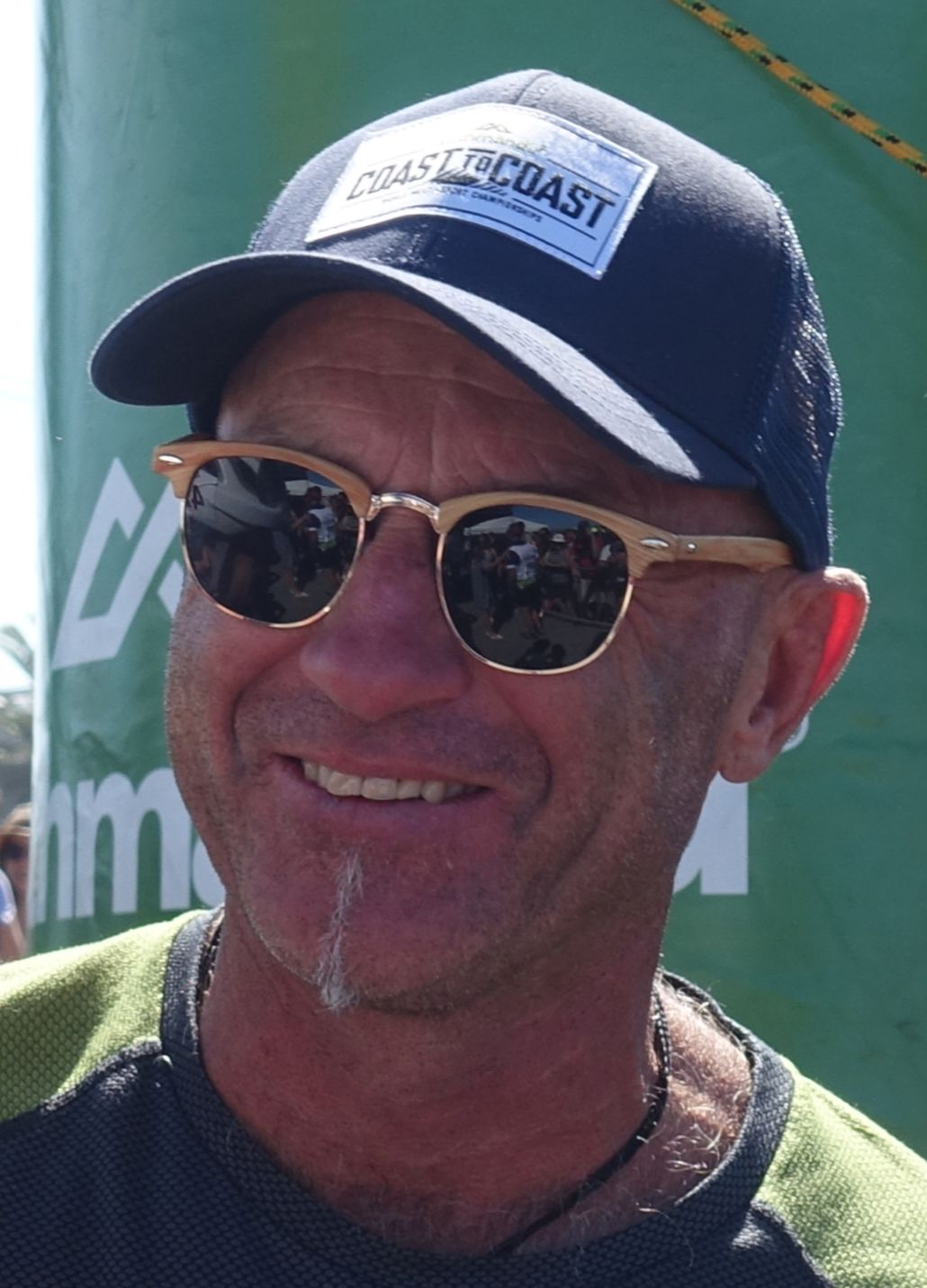
- Gurney in 2019

Personal information
- Full name: Stephen Bruce Gurney
- Born: 8 July 1963 (age 62) Hamilton, New Zealand

Stephen Bruce Gurney MNZM (born 8 July 1963) is a New Zealand multisport and triathlon athlete. He has won the Coast to Coast race a record nine times.

== Early life ==
Born in Hamilton, Gurney studied mechanical engineering at the University of Canterbury, graduating with a Bachelor of Engineering degree in 1986.

== Career ==
Up until 1994, he was a professional multisport and triathlon athlete. From there he moved into what is known as adventure racing. In New Zealand, he has competed in races such as the Speights Coast to Coast and the Southern Traverse. Internationally he competed in race events such as the Raid Gauloises, Eco-Challenge and Extreme Games. He won the Coast to Coast a record 9 times, more than any other person, in 1990, 1991, and 1997 to 2003. Steve brought increased exposure to the race by surprising the nation and becoming the first nudist on NZ Breakfast TV. He represented New Zealand at the Mountain Bike World Championships twice. Gurney also starred in the New Zealand TV shows "Clash of the Codes" and "Dancing with the Stars".

In 1994, a severe Leptospirosis infection caught from bat dung in the Mulu caves whilst racing in Sarawak jungles in Malaysia very nearly cost him his life with respiratory and renal failure. His determination and patience allowed him to fight back to full fitness and 7 of his Coast to Coast wins came after this infection.

During his racing career Steve heavily used his engineering degree and experience to push at the edges of the rules and possibilities to give himself and his teams a winning edge. Inventing items such as a bike pod, improved kayak seats, anti-chafing solutions and more.

Gurney was appointed a Member of the New Zealand Order of Merit, for services to endurance sport, in the 2004 New Year Honours.

== Retirement ==
On 8 August 2007, he announced his retirement from the sport due to a two-year fight with an ankle injury. He said he was disappointed that he could not win a 10th Coast to Coast title and also that he finished his last competitive race in 2nd place. He now presents motivational talks, develops new sports related products and undertakes unique challenges around the world Together with Christchurch adventure racers Steve Moffatt, Gurney recognised the strong talent in Anton Cooper, a cross-country cyclist, and organised financial support from various business people.

As part of the Mad Way South team Steve holds two world records:

- The first crossing of the Sahara Desert by wind power alone
- The longest kite buggy, at 2160 km

During the journey he experienced a high speed crash, at the time a local hospital reported no broken bones and he continued the journey despite being in significant pain. On returning to New Zealand and completing new scans he discovered he had 4 facial fractures, a 6 cm piece broken from a scapula, a badly torn rotator cuff and a damaged eardrum. He has since fully recovered from all injuries.

Gurney lost his home in the 2011 Christchurch earthquakes as it became uninhabitable and the land it was built on became unstable. After helping front a well orchestrated and prolonged battle with local insurance companies he took the opportunity to move to Queenstown, New Zealand's capital of adventure sports.

== Bibliography ==
- Lucky Legs: what I’ve learned about winning & losing ISBN 978-1-86979-060-8
- Eating Dirt ISBN 978-1-86979-967-0
- The Beginners Guide to Adventure Sport in New Zealand ISBN 978-1-77553-837-0

== Sources ==
- Leppin Sport profile
