= Anne Judkins =

New Zealand racewalker (born 1964)

Personal information
- Full name: Anne Maree Judkins
- Born: 1 March 1964 (age 62) Takapuna, New Zealand
- Height: 1.65 m (5 ft 5 in)
- Weight: 54 kg (119 lb)

Sport
- Country: New Zealand
- Sport: Track and field
- Event: Racewalking
Medal record
Women's athletics
Representing New Zealand
Commonwealth Games
Silver medal – second place	1990 Auckland	10 km walk

Anne Maree Judkins (born 1 March 1964) is a retired female track and field athlete from New Zealand who specialised in racewalking.

Judkins was born in 1964. Her uncle is Robin Judkins, a retired sports administrator from Christchurch. She received her secondary school education at Tikipunga High School.

She competed for New Zealand in the 1990 Commonwealth Games, winning a silver in the 10 km road walk, and she was awarded the New Zealand 1990 Commemoration Medal. In the 1992 Summer Olympics she came 9th in the 10 km road walk with a time of 45m 28s.

== Achievements ==
Year	Competition	Venue	Position	Event	Notes
Representing New Zealand
1990	Commonwealth Games	Auckland, New Zealand	2nd	10 km	47:03
1992	Olympic Games	Barcelona, Spain	9th	10 km	45:28
