= Wally Speight =

English footballer

Personal information
- Full name: Walter Speight
- Date of birth: 1881
- Place of birth: Elsecar, England
- Position: Inside forward

Senior career*
Years	Team	Apps	(Gls)
1903–1904	Grimsby Town	6	(1)
1904–1905	Rotherham Town		
1905–19??	Worksop Town		
- * Club domestic league appearances and goals

Walter Speight (1881 – after 1904) was an English professional footballer who played as an inside forward.
