= Mount Franklin (Canterbury) =

Mountain in New Zealand

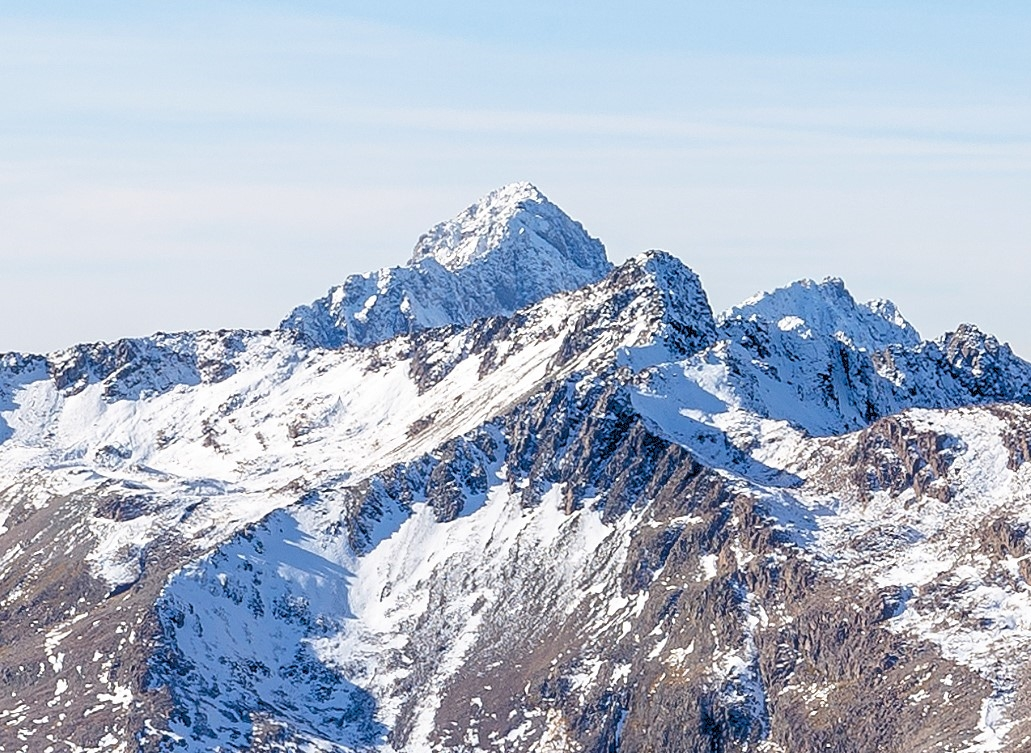
- Southswest aspect, centred in back

Highest point
- Elevation: 2,145 m (7,037 ft)
- Prominence: 1,225 m (4,019 ft)
- Isolation: 12.85 km (7.98 mi)
- Coordinates: 42.869988°S 171.659381°E

Geography
- Location within New Zealand
- Interactive map of Mount Franklin
- Location: South Island
- Country: New Zealand
- Region: West Coast
- Protected area: Arthur's Pass National Park
- Parent range: Aicken Range
- Topo map(s): NZMS260 K33; Topo50 BV20

Climbing
- First ascent: November 1930

Mount Franklin is located 12 kilometres (7.5 mi) northeast of Arthur's Pass, and is the second tallest of the New Zealand mountains with this name. It forms part of the ridge of the Southern Alps. As such, it is located close to the border between the Canterbury and West Coast regions. Rising to a height of 2,145 metres (7,037 ft), it is located within Arthur's Pass National Park. It is regarded as a good mountain to climb.

== Climate ==
Based on the Köppen climate classification, Mount Franklin is located in a marine west coast climate zone. Prevailing westerly winds blow moist air from the Tasman Sea onto the mountain, where the air is forced upwards by the mountains (orographic lift), causing moisture to drop in the form of rain and snow. The months of December through February offer the most favourable weather for viewing or climbing this peak.

== Climbing ==
Climbing routes:

- South Ridge – A.C. Snowden, A.S. Ahnfeldt – (1930)
- North Ridge – Raphael Bullet, Ryan Nicol – (2019)
- West Ridge
- South West Ridge
- South West Ridge Couloirs
- Oates-Franklin Ridge
