= Robin Judkins =

New Zealand sports official

Robin Judkins ONZM
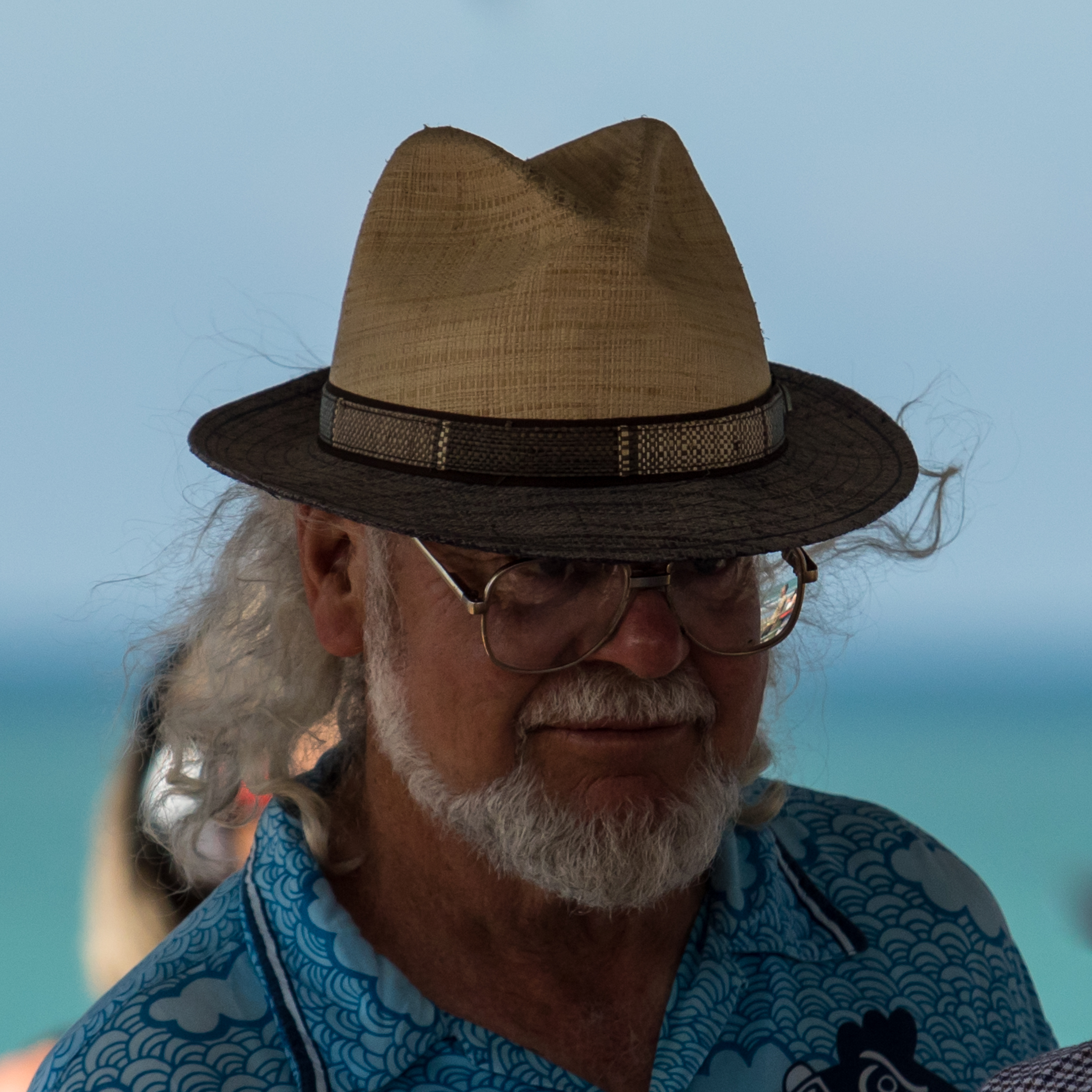
- Judkins in 2016
- Born: 10 May 1949 (age 77); Geraldine, New Zealand
- Known for: Founder of Coast to Coast race
- Relatives: Anne Judkins (niece)

Robin Austin Judkins ONZM (born 10 May 1949) is a New Zealand sports administrator. He created the Alpine Ironman and the Coast to Coast, races that are often credited for being the origin of adventure racing. He has published an autobiography, Mad Dogs: Life on the Edge.

== Early life ==
Judkins was born at Geraldine in 1949 to parents Mary Marjorie "Dot" Dwyer (born 1910) and Walter Judkins. He was one of their nine children. The family lived on Sunny Downs farm in South Canterbury before moving to Diamond Harbour when he was ten. They retired to Christchurch in 1964. Judkins' mother died in March 2018 aged 108. The former racewalker Anne Judkins is his niece. Judkins received his schooling at St Bede's College and was an A-grade student, but never showed any interest in education. He was the captain of the school's rugby team for a while. Aged 16, he discovered skiing, which became his lifelong passion. He spent a year at the University of Canterbury and seven months at Christchurch Teachers' College to become a teacher, but he failed "miserably" because he had not learned how to swot.

== Young adulthood ==
In his early 20s, Judkins followed the winter whenever he had money to travel, and skied in North America and New Zealand. He competed in ski racing and his best result was a tenth place in the New Zealand nationals in 1973. He had a variety of employers and never stayed anywhere for more than two years. He wrote a book of poetry for which he could not find a publisher in New Zealand, but moved to Australia and utilised the 50% subsidy that Gough Whitlam's government was offering towards Australian-produced literature; Judkins successfully claimed to be Australian to receive the subsidy towards 600 copies of Burning Days in 1976. He then took a job as a travelling salesman for McGraw-Hill Publishing and the luxury of having an expense account turned him into a chronic alcoholic. He refused further travel to stem his drinking and lost his job. Judkins has abstained from drinking any alcohol since.

The redundancy money from McGraw-Hill Publishing paid for a relocation of Judkins and his girlfriend Lorraine to London. They returned to Sydney by 1977 and he became self-employed as a house-painter. In 1979, he moved back to New Zealand. Judkins and his girlfriend got married, and they had two daughters. He split up with his wife in 2002.

== Sports administration ==
Judkins organised his first sports event in 1975, the Coca-Cola Freestyle Skiing Contest. He fell out with his two partners and proceeded alone, vowing to never again team up with others for organising an event. After his time in Australia and London, his next venture into sport as a business was to set up Motatapu Canoes; the idea to do so came to him when he was kayaking the Motatapu River with his friend Peter Tocker. They had a high-profile launch of the company by the local MP, Warren Cooper, who attended as Minister of Tourism. Things went wrong during the launch and, according to Judkins, Cooper nearly drowned. But promotion has always been important to Judkins, and the publicity helped to get off to a good start. Aiming for greater things, they changed the name of the company to Outdoor Adventure Centre. Part of their plan was to offer private expeditions called 'Aspiring to the Pacific', and when he and Tocker did a test run, it took them twelve days to complete it. Somewhere on the Clutha River, the idea came to them that they should have started on the West Coast, so that the expedition went from coast to coast. It was the nucleus of the idea for the Coast to Coast adventure race that began several years later in 1983.

Judkins decided in 1982 to organise the Coast to Coast race, and had secured sponsorship from Macpac through his friend Geoff Gabbites, one of Macpac's former directors. Judkins returned to Wānaka for the summer to organise funding for the Coast to Coast, and he organised three rock concerts; one in Wānaka and two in Queenstown. The first concert had insufficient attendance for Judkins to even break even, the second event was rained out, and it was too cold and miserable for the third concert to go ahead. Judkins sold his house to pay off his debts. The first Coast to Coast race was held in 1983 with 79 competitors. It was not until the 1986 that Judkins made his first profit from the annual event. He invested his earnings in the Ōhau skifield, but it was taken out by a major avalanche on day 13 of its operation. In 1987, a television documentary was produced while Judkins held the Alpine Ironman. A lifelong fan of English singer-songwriter and guitarist Chris Rea, he took the opportunity to meet with the Brit while he was on a concert tour. The outcome of this was permission to use three titles from Rea's album Wired to the Moon to be used for the soundtrack. 1987 was also the year that the Coast to Coast became a one-day event.

1992 was very challenging for Judkins. He organised the Coast to Coast, tried to get a Scottish version of the event up and running, tried to find sponsorship so that he could repeat the 1990 Xerox Challenge, and he organised a mountain marathon to be held on the Milford Track – the Milford Mountain Marathon. The latter event was most contentious and caused much angst, including death threats, physical attacks and anonymous phone calls. Judkins fought a very public fight with politicians and conservationists, including Gerry McSweeney, and obtained all the approvals and permits, but cancelled the event. He was exhausted and disillusioned.

He sold the Coast to Coast event to Queenstown-based Trojan Holdings Ltd on 10 May 2013 on his 64th birthday. He acted as race director in 2014 for the final time at the 33rd event.

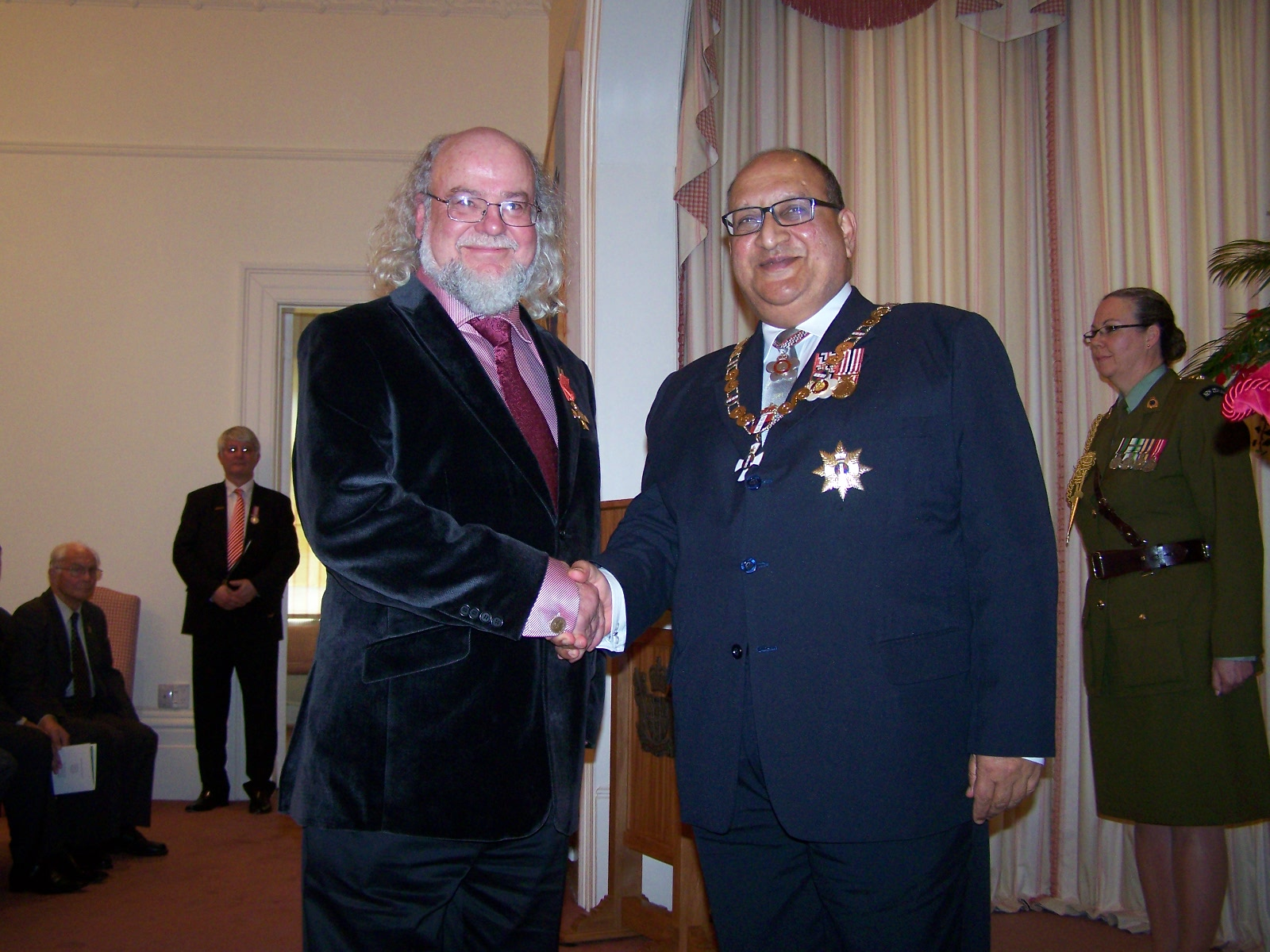
Judkins (left), after his investiture as an Officer of the New Zealand Order of Merit by the governor-general, Sir Anand Satyanand, at Premier House, Wellington, on 1 September 2009

In the 2009 Queen's Birthday Honours, Judkins was appointed an Officer of the New Zealand Order of Merit, for services to sports administration.
