= John Howard (adventure racer) =

John Howard is considered the central pioneer of adventure racing.

Very few individuals have dominated endurance sports in the way John dominated adventure racing. Since winning the first ever major adventure race held in the world, the Raid Gauloises in 1989, he went on to win every significant race in the sport, including Eco-Challenge (three times), the Raid Gauloises (three times), the Elf Authentique, the ESPN X-Games (twice) and the Southern Traverse. In addition, he has served as a course designer or advisor to numerous high-profile outdoor adventure events, including the Mild Seven Outdoor Quest, Action Asia and New Zealand's Coast to Coast (which he won in 1984).

In discussing his win of the Coast to Coast in 1984 Howard claims that were only about 50 competitors at the time. These were very different competitors than the present day, describing them as "outdoors people" rather than those who do sports specific training.

In 1984, Howard lived in Christchurch, New Zealand (his home country), and worked as a window cleaner.

He is perceived as somewhat of an enigma in the sport. At the Raids Gauloises in Borneo in 1994, he revolutionised the way teams approached adventure races such as the Eco-Challenge and Raid Gauloises by taking the bare minimum of equipment, including food and water, between checkpoints, and wearing shorts, a T-shirt and running shoes, and carrying a microscopic backpack. Previously competitors had competed in hiking and mountaineering gear and carried heavy bags throughout the event. This gave Howard and his team a huge advantage and they blitzed the course, winning an expected eight-day race in five. His advantage was only temporary; from 1995, everybody was racing in a similar, stripped-down fashion.

Ian Adamson, considered by many the Michael Jordan of the sport, describes Howard as, "... a unique individual. He cultivates a disheveled look to maintain his individuality and to match his already eccentric persona. On a personal level he is extremely caring and generous, and I would (and have) placed my life in his hands. John looks like a mountain man because he is. He has an immensely deep background in all back country skills since this is the life he has led since he was a teenager. He has also been winning adventure races longer than most athletes have been around. Finally, he races exclusively with people he likes, respects and who he knows he can win with."

On 20 August 2005, Primal Quest announced that John Howard was joining the world's premier adventure race as Technical Director.
