= Adventure Racing World Series =

Endurance racing series

The Adventure Racing World Series (ARWS) is an endurance racing season where adventure racing teams compete in a range of disciplines including, for example, navigation, trekking, mountain biking, paddling and climbing.

== Format ==
Mixed sex teams of four competitors compete in a series of up to a dozen non-stop, multi-day expedition adventure races held in locations spread across the globe. These races culminate in the staging of the Adventure Racing World Championships, the winner of which is crowned World Champions.

The competition's format provides that each of the individual events of the World Series function as a qualifier for the World Championships. The winning team at each event secures the opportunity to compete in the World Championships. The field of event winners is then supplemented by the reigning world champions, who are given the right to defend their title, the winners of regional championship races and the remainder of the field comes from open entry round out the number of starters.

The World Championship race rotates each year. One of the qualifying events is singled out and designated as the World Championship event and this event provides a dramatic conclusion to the end of the World Series racing season.

In addition to the World Championship race, points are assigned to results from each of the qualifying races in the series to determine a World Ranking. Points are allocated on a team's best four results over a two-year period (with heavier weighting given to World Championship results), with the ranking cycle refreshed every 4 months.

== History ==
The Adventure Racing World Championship was the brainchild of Geoff Hunt and Pascale Lorre, long-time adventure racers who sought to "lend badly needed structure to the sport". Hunt and Lorre's vision was first brought to fruition in Switzerland in 2001 where 41 teams contested the Discovery Channel World Championship Adventure Race with the controversy-plagued event eventually won by Finland's Team Nokia Adventure. A team from New Zealand, including Kathy Lynch, came second that year, US Team GoLite (became Nike ACG the following year) was 3rd.

After a two-year hiatus the Adventure Racing World Championships was next held in Canada in 2004 and has subsequently been held every year since.

In 2011 management of the race was passed to the Australian event management company Geocentric Outdoors. The 2011 World Championships - won by Thule Adventure Team - were staged at the XPD Expedition Race in Tasmania, Australia, where 90 teams drawn from 21 countries made for the largest starting field in the event's history. This is testament to the fact that the World Series hosts some of the best expedition adventure racing teams in the world and "continues to grow and become more prominent". Geocentric Outdoors also instigated a number of new initiatives for the world series, including standardized equipment lists and logistics across the races, restrictions on mixed nationality teams at the World Championship race each year as well as the introduction of the World Series ranking system. These initiatives have encouraged larger international fields at the various races by lowering the logistical barriers for participation and rewarding participation in multiple events.

In 2012, the World Championships was held at Raid in France and were won by Team Seagate from New Zealand. The title of World Champion returned to the Thule Adventure Team at Costa Rica in 2013, before again being reclaimed by Team Seagate in Ecuador in 2014. Despite having never won a World Championship, Spanish team Columbia Vidaraid held the number-one position in the World Series ranking through 2014 and 2015 due to their string of wins in World Series qualifying races in addition to their second-place finishes in the 2013 and 2014 World Championships. Seagate regained the top position in the rankings in 2016 after dominating at the incredibly demanding 2015 World Championships, held in the Pantanal in Brazil, as well as in the Shoalhaven area of Australia in 2016.

In the absence of a world governing body, and after the cessation of the dominant world level events in the mid 2000s like the Raid Gauloises (Raid World Series and World Championships) Eco-Challenge, Primal Quest, and Outdoor Quest, the Adventure Racing World Series remained as the only series in the sport.

== Depictions in culture ==
A memoir of the 2014 Ecuador race by Mikael Lindnord was published in 2016, focusing on a dog that attached itself to his team. Lindnord's book was adapted into the 2024 film Arthur the King, which transposed the story to 2018 and the Dominican Republic.

== World Championship results ==
Year	Country	Race	World Champion	Nationality
2001	Switzerland	Discovery Channel World Championships	Team Nokia Adventure	Finland
2004	Canada	Raid The North Extreme	Nike ACG Balance Bar	USA
2005	New Zealand	Southern Traverse	Balance Vector	New Zealand
2006	Sweden	Explore Sweden	Nike PowerBlast	USA
2007	Scotland	Wilderness ARC	Nike	USA
2008	Brazil	Ecomotion	Orion Health	New Zealand
2009	Portugal	Portugal XPD	Helly Hansen Prunesco	Britain
2010	Spain	Bimbache Extrem	Buff Thermocool	Spain
2011	Australia	XPD Expedition Race	Thule Adventure Team	Sweden
2012	France	Raid in France	Team Seagate	New Zealand
2013	Costa Rica	Costa Rica AR	Thule Adventure Team	France
2014	Ecuador	Huairasinchi Explorer	Seagate	New Zealand
2015	Brazil	ARWS Brazil	Seagate	New Zealand
2016	Australia	XPD Expedition Race	Seagate	New Zealand
2017	USA	Cameco Cowboy Tough	Seagate	New Zealand
2018	La Reunion Island	Raid in France	Avaya	New Zealand
2019	Sri Lanka	ARWS	Canceled	
2020	Paraguay	Expedición Guaraní	Canceled	
2021	Spain	Raid Gallaecia	Swedish Armed Forces Adventure Team	Sweden
2022	Paraguay	Expedición Guaraní	Team Avaya	New Zealand
2023	South Africa	Expedition Africa	Swedish Armed Forces Adventure Team	Sweden
2024	Ecuador	Huairasinchi	400team	France
2025	Canada	Expedition Canada	?	?

== 2015 Adventure Racing World Series ==
Race	Country	Dates	Winner	Nationality
GODZone Adventure Race	New Zealand	March 2015	Seagate	New Zealand
Tierra Viva	Chile	April 2015	SAFAT	Sweden
Raid Gallaecia	Spain	May 2015	Haglofs Sliva	Sweden
Expedition Africa	Swaziland	June 2015	Merrell Adventure Addicts	South Africa
Expedition Alaska	USA	June 2015	Tecnu	USA
Cameco Cowboy Tough	USA	July 2015	Tecnu	USA
XPD Expedition Race	Australia	August 2015	Mountain Designs	Australia
Raid in France	France	September 2015	Raidlight	France
ARWS Brazil	Brazil	November 2015	Seagate	New Zealand

== 2016 Adventure Racing World Series ==
Race	Country	Dates	Winner	Nationality
Maya Mountain Adventure Challenge	Belize	February 2016	Team Adventure Medical Kits	USA
GODZone Adventure Race	New Zealand	April 2016	Team Yealands Family Wines	New Zealand
Tierra Viva	Chile	April 2016	2 DSN 74 Hoka	France
Expedition Africa	South Africa	May 2016	Team Featherbed Painted Wolf	South Africa
Expedition Guarani	Paraguay	July 2016	Columbia Vidaraid	Brazil/Spain/UK
Cameco Cowboy Tough	USA	July 2016	Team Adventure Medical Kits	USA
Huairasinchi	Ecuador	August 2016	Fairis	Ecuador
ITERA Expedition Race	Ireland	August 2016	TEAM FMR	France
Raid in France	France	September 2016	Seagate	New Zealand
Xtrail Expedition (Demonstration Race)	China	September 2016	Thule Adventure Team	Sweden
XPD World Championships	Australia	November 2016	Seagate	New Zealand

== 2017 Adventure Racing World Series ==
Race	Country	Dates	Winner	Nationality
Expedition Guarani	Paraguay	March 2017	Cyanosis	South Africa
Huairasinchi	Ecuador	April 2017	Terra Aventura – Finalin	Ecuador
Raid Gallaecia	Spain	May 2017	Naturex	France
Expedition Africa	South Africa	May 2017	Skylotec Adventure	Sweden
Xtrail Expedition	China	June 2017	Seagate	New Zealand
Raid in France	France	June 2017	Lozere Team2Raid	France
Cameco Cowboy Tough World Championships	USA	August 2017	Seagate	New Zealand

== 2018 Adventure Racing World Series ==
Race	Country	Dates	Winner	Nationality
Maya Mountain Adventure Challenge	Belize	March 2018	Bones	USA
XPD Expedition Race	Australia	April 2018	Tri Adventure Antelopes	Australia
Expedition Guarani	Paraguay	May 2018	Columbia Vidaraid	Brazil
Expedition Africa	South Africa	May 2018	Blizzard	Russia
Expedition Oregon	USA	June 2018	Leki	Sweden
Huairasinchi	Ecuador	June 2018	Movistar - Terra Aventura	Ecuador
Nordic Islands AR	Sweden/Finland	August 2018	Swedish Armed Forces	Sweden
Shenandoah Tough	USA	September 2018	Mountain Race Company	USA
Raid in France World Championships	La Reunion Island, France	December 2018	Avaya	New Zealand

== 2019 Adventure Racing World Series ==
Race	Country	Dates	Winner	Nationality
Expedition India	India	March 2019	Naturex	South Africa
Expedition Guarani	Paraguay	April 2019	Columbia Vidaraid	Brazil
Expedition Oregon	USA	April 2019	Quest AR	USA
Raid Gallaecia	Spain	May 2019	Team Yeti	Denmark
Huairasinchi	Ecuador	June 2019	Columbia Vidaraid	Brazil
Nordic Islands AR	Sweden/Norway	July 2019	Swedish Armed Forces	Sweden
ITERA	Scotland	August 2019	Lozere Team2Raid	France
Expedition Africa	Rodrigues Island	September 2019	Greener Adventure Cyklekraft	Sweden
Adventure Race Croatia	Croatia	September 2019	USWE	Sweden
Sri Lanka World Championships	Sri Lanka	November 2019	Canceled*	-

- Canceled due to 2019 Sri Lanka Easter bombings

== 2020 Adventure Racing World Series ==
Race	Country	Dates	Winner	Nationality
Patagonia Raid	Argentina	February 2020	Columbia Vidaraid	Brazil

Canceled races (due to COVID-19):||Expedition Africa, Adventure Race Malaysia, ITERA, Raid in France, Adventure Race Croatia, Expedition Oregon, PC 12 AR, XPD Adventure Race, Nordic Islands AR, Huairasinchi, Expedición Guaraní World Championships

== 2021 Adventure Racing World Series ==
Race	Country	Dates	Winner	Nationality
Huairasinchi	Ecuador	December 2020	Team Movistar Terra Aventura	Ecuador
Expedition Oregon	USA	May 2021	Columbia La Jolla IVF	Spain
PC 12 AR	Colombia	June 2021	Team Bosi	Colombia
Nordic Islands AR	Sweden	June 2021	Swedish Armed Forces	Sweden
XPD Adventure Race	Australia	July 2021	Resicon-Thought Sports	Australia
Huairasinchi	Ecuador	September 2021	Team Movistar Terra Aventura	Ecuador
Raid Gallaecia World Championships	Spain	October 2021	Swedish Armed Forces	Sweden

Canceled races (due to COVID-19):||Expedition Africa, Adventure Race Malaysia, ITERA, Raid in France, Adventure Race Croatia, Patagonia Raid

== 2022 Adventure Racing World Series ==
Race	Country	Dates	Winner	Nationality
Panama AR	Panama	February 2022	Brazil Multisport	Brazil
Expedition Africa	Lesotho	April 2022	Estonia ACE Adventure La Sportiva	Estonia
Expedition Oregon	USA	May 2022	Vidaraid	USA/Spain
Adventure Race Croatia	Croatia	June 2022	Swedish Armed Forces	Sweden
Expedition Canada	Canada	June 2022	Bend Racing	USA
Raid in France	Australia	July 2022	400 Team Naturex	France
Huairasinchi	Ecuador	August 2022	Fairis-Proflora	Ecuador
ITERA	Scotland	August 2022	Racing Denmark	Denmark
Expedition Guarani World Championships	Paraguay	September 2022	Avaya	New Zealand

== 2023 Adventure Racing World Series ==
Race	Country	Dates	Winner	Nationality
Legend Adventure Race	Australia	February 2023	E-dog and the JJ's	Australia
Adventure Race Croatia	Croatia	May 2023	Swedish Armed Forces	Sweden
Expedition Canada	Canada	May 2023	400team Givaudan	Sweden
Endless Mountains AR	USA	May 2023	Bend Racing	USA
PC 12 AR	Colombia	June 2023	Vidaraid	Spain/USA
Huairasinchi	Ecuador	July 2023	Andes Racing	Ecuador
Nordic Islands AR	Faroe Islands	August 2023	NIAR	Sweden
Expedicion Guarani	Paraguay	August 2023	San Juan Aventura	Argentina
Expedition Africa World Championships	South Africa	October 2023	Swedish Armed Forces	Sweden

== 2024 Adventure Racing World Series ==
Race	Country	Dates	Winner	Nationality
Legend Adventure Race	Australia	February 2024	Mountain Designs Wild Women	Australia
Tierra Indomita - Vulania	Chile	April 2024	Vidaraid	Spain
Expedition Ozark	USA	May 2024	Estonian ACE/La Sportiva	Estonia
Malacara Expedition	Brazil	April 2024	AKSA Expenature?	Brazil/France
Adventure Race Croatia	Croatia	May 2024	Tactical Foodpack	Estonia
Expedition Africa	Namibia	May 2024	Merrell Songlines	South Africa
PC 12 AR	Colombia	June 2024	Vidaraid	Spain
Rajd Beskidy	Poland	June 2024	Gymcity AR	Poland
Raid in France	France	July 2024	400team	France
Expedicion Guarani	Paraguay	July 2024	Uruguay Ultra Sports	Uruguay
AR Panama	Panama	August 2024	Andes Racing Ecuador	Ecuador
Expedition Oregon	USA	September 2024	Bend Racing/4 Hour Fuel	Canada
Huairasinchi World Championships	Ecuador	November 2024	400team	France

== Bibliography ==
- Swift E.M. "Chilling Debut", sportsillustrated.cnn.com, 2001-10-17, retrieved 2011-11-19
- AG Outdoor "2011 Adventure Race World Championships", australiangeographic.com.au/outdoor, retrieved 2011-11-19
- Explore Compete Live "Raid in France to hold 2012 Adventure Race World Championships", explorecompetelive.com, 2011-1-18, retrieved 2011-11-19
- Sleepmonsters "Australian company takes over Adventure Racing World Series management", sleepmonsters.com, 2011-2-22, retrieved 2011-11-19
- The Free Dictionary "ARWS acronym", retrieved 2011-11-19
- Science Daily "Ultra-Endurance Athletes Suffer No Cardiac Fatigue, Even After Six Days of Non-Stop Exercise, Swedish Study Finds", sciencedaily.com, 2010-8-31, retrieved 2011-11-19
- Scotland "Adventure Racing World Championships 2007", retrieved 2011-11-19
- Xtreme Sport "Orionhealth.com from New Zealand are crowned the 2008 Adventure Racing World Champions", xtremesports4u.com, 2008-10-11, retrieved 2011-11-19
- Xtreme Sport "England is triumphant! The XPD Portugal World Champions are British – congratulations", xtremesports4u.com,2009-11-16, retrieved 2011-11-19
- Adventure Junkie "Gold Rush Mother Lode adventure race joins AR World Series" theadventureblog.com, 2011-4-25, retrieved 2011-1-19
- Sleepmonsters "Thule Adventure Team – Winning the World Championships", xwww.sleepmonsters.com, retrieved 2011-12-01
