= Obstacle sports =

Obstacle sports are a family of competitive sports in which athletes negotiate a series of physical obstacles, racing against rivals or against the clock. They include obstacle racing, Ninja, and related formats.

Athletes negotiating suspended obstacles at the 2026 UIPM Obstacle World Championships in Beijing.

Modern obstacle sports developed through several strands, including military obstacle-course training, civilian obstacle racing and television-based Ninja competition. Obstacle course racing (OCR) grew rapidly as a mass-participation activity during the 2000s and 2010s through event series including Spartan Race, Tough Mudder and Warrior Dash.

The Union Internationale de Pentathlon Moderne (UIPM) is the international governing body for obstacle sports. Members of the Fédération Internationale de Sports d'Obstacles (FISO), also known as World Obstacle, voted in March 2026 to dissolve that federation and integrate its international structure into UIPM. The dissolution took effect on 10 August 2026, at the conclusion of FISO's final World Championships. At national level, integration between UIPM and former FISO member federations is continuing during a transition period scheduled to run until 31 December 2027.

Obstacle racing is also a discipline within modern pentathlon. The revised pentathlon was introduced at youth level in 2023 and at senior level in 2025, and will be contested at the 2028 Summer Olympics in Los Angeles.

== Sports and formats ==
=== Obstacle racing ===
Obstacle racing consists of races in which competitors run between and negotiate a sequence of physical obstacles. Obstacles include climbing walls, ropes, monkey bars, balance structures, crawls and weighted carries. The format can combine elements associated with both traditional obstacle course racing and Ninja competition.

An athlete competing at the 2026 UIPM Obstacle World Championships in Beijing.

Race length and competitive emphasis vary widely. Mass-participation events combine endurance running with mud and natural or artificial obstacles, while some international championship formats use standardised distances and obstacle specifications.

Organised obstacle racing has developed in several regions outside Europe and North America, including India and Hong Kong.

Under UIPM, which organised its first two Obstacle World Championships in Beijing, China, in 2025 and 2026, championship events include 100-metre, 400-metre and 3-kilometre racing, as well as relay events.

=== Ninja ===
Ninja is an obstacle format using short courses with closely spaced technical obstacles. Competitors negotiate hanging, swinging, climbing, balance and transfer elements, and are ranked by completion and time.

The format developed through the Japanese television competition SASUKE, first broadcast in 1997, and the international adaptations later produced under the Ninja Warrior name. SASUKE became an export television format and influenced obstacle design outside Japan.

Ninja subsequently developed outside television through specialist gyms, leagues and competitions. FISO recognised Ninja alongside obstacle course racing and adventure racing within its structure.

The boundary between Ninja and obstacle racing has become less rigid, and athletes increasingly compete in both.

In May 2026, UIPM and Tokyo Broadcasting System Television (TBS), the producer of SASUKE, agreed terms covering the use of TBS-designed obstacles and programme elements in UIPM competition. Under the agreement, Ninja Warrior-derived obstacles will be used in the modern pentathlon event at Los Angeles 2028.

=== Other formats ===
FISO also recognised adventure racing within its structure. The classification of disciplines has continued to change during the transition to UIPM governance.

== History ==
=== Origins ===
Modern obstacle-course traditions have strong roots in military training. Purpose-built courses were adopted by European armies during the 19th century, and their use spread to armed forces worldwide during the two world wars. Elements of military obstacle training were later adapted into civilian competition.

Britain's Tough Guy competition, founded in 1987 by a former British soldier on a farm near Wolverhampton, was an early civilian obstacle race and combined cross-country running with water, climbing and other obstacles.

=== Growth of obstacle course racing ===
Commercial obstacle racing expanded rapidly in the late 2000s and early 2010s. Tough Mudder began staging events in 2010, and Spartan Race and Warrior Dash developed large mass-participation series. By 2012, the three largest series expected close to two million participants between them.

An estimated 1.6 million people took part in obstacle races in the United States in 2012. By 2015, participation in obstacle and mud races in the United States exceeded combined participation in half-marathons and marathons. The growth supported a commercial industry based on entry fees, sponsorship, training and branded race series.

Participation in the United States declined in the mid-2010s. The number of obstacle-race finishers fell by about 30 percent in 2015, according to figures compiled by Running USA.

Organised competitive racing continued to develop internationally, including efforts to standardise courses and obtain recognition within the international sports system.

The mass-participation history and culture of this period is covered in obstacle course racing.

=== Development of Ninja ===
SASUKE established a staged format in which competitors attempted successive purpose-built obstacle courses, and its international adaptations brought the format to audiences in numerous countries. The growth of specialist gyms and independent competitions allowed Ninja to develop as an organised competitive activity outside television.

== International governance ==
=== Fédération Internationale de Sports d'Obstacles ===
The Fédération Internationale de Sports d'Obstacles (FISO), also known as World Obstacle, was founded in 2014, formalised in 2018, and registered in Switzerland. Its remit covered obstacle course racing, Ninja and adventure racing.

FISO developed a network of national federations, international competition structures, technical rules and world and continental championships. In October 2021 the Global Association of International Sports Federations granted it observer status. GAISF was subsequently dissolved in November 2022.

=== Cooperation with UIPM ===
UIPM's involvement with obstacle racing arose from changes to modern pentathlon. After the Tokyo 2020 Olympic cycle, UIPM began considering changes to the format of modern pentathlon.

In May 2022 UIPM selected obstacle racing for testing. The decision followed consideration of several proposed alternatives.

Obstacle racing was tested at international pentathlon events from 2022. In November 2022, the UIPM Congress voted to amend the federation's statutes to include obstacle racing as a discipline within modern pentathlon.

UIPM and FISO subsequently began coordinating their structures, and by 2025 were working towards full integration.

=== Integration into UIPM ===
In March 2026 delegates to the 12th FISO Congress and World Obstacle General Assembly voted to dissolve FISO and complete the integration with UIPM. The resolution received 96.2 percent support, with 3.8 percent abstaining and no votes against.

Delegates at the 12th FISO Congress in 2026, where FISO members voted to dissolve the federation and complete its integration with UIPM.

FISO was dissolved on 10 August 2026, after its final World Championships, completing the formal integration of obstacle sport into UIPM. UIPM subsequently became the institutional representative of obstacle sport within the Olympic Movement. National federations formerly affiliated with FISO entered a transition period as UIPM member candidates, scheduled to run until 31 December 2027.

=== UIPM Obstacle Commission ===
UIPM's 2024 Congress agreed to create an Obstacle Commission. In April 2026 the former FISO president Ian Adamson was named as its first chair, alongside members from Britain, the United States, the Philippines and Italy.

== International competition ==
=== World Championships ===
Medalists at the 2026 UIPM Obstacle World Championships in Beijing.

An Obstacle Course Racing World Championships was staged at Blue Mountain, Ontario, in 2017, drawing around 4,000 competitors over a 15-kilometre course with 34 obstacles.

FISO and its member organisations ran their own world and continental championships. The 2023 World Obstacle/UIPM OCR World Championships were held in Genk, Belgium. FISO's final World Championships were held at Limerick Racecourse, Ireland, in August 2026.

UIPM launched its Obstacle World Championships in Beijing in 2025, with athletes from modern pentathlon and OCR competing over 100 metres, 400 metres and 3 kilometres. Beijing was awarded the first four editions, from 2025 to 2028. The second edition took place at Universal CityWalk Beijing from 2 to 6 September 2026 and included a 4 × 100-metre relay and a 3-kilometre team event alongside the individual 100-metre, 400-metre and 3-kilometre formats.

=== Multisport Games ===
Obstacle racing has been contested as a medal sport at the Southeast Asian Games. It was included in the 2019 edition in the Philippines, with six gold medals awarded, and returned at the 2023 edition in Cambodia, where four events were held: men's and women's individual 100 metres and men's and women's team relays.

The Philippines won all four titles in 2023, having also won all six events in 2019. The country's national governing body, the Pilipinas Obstacle Sports Federation, was formed in 2017 and is recognised by the Philippine Olympic Committee.

== Relationship with modern pentathlon ==
Modern pentathlon traditionally consisted of fencing, swimming, equestrian show jumping, running and shooting. Following the Tokyo 2020 Olympic cycle, UIPM decided to replace riding as part of efforts to modernise the sport and appeal to a younger and broader audience.

UIPM began testing obstacle racing as the replacement in 2022. The change was approved by the UIPM Congress, and the revised sport was retained on the Olympic programme for Los Angeles 2028. Obstacle racing appeared at the Modern Pentathlon World Championships for the first time in 2025.

The revised pentathlon consists of fencing, obstacle racing, swimming and laser-run. At Los Angeles 2028 the obstacle discipline will use Ninja Warrior-derived obstacles under UIPM's agreement with TBS. Medals will be awarded in modern pentathlon rather than in obstacle racing as a separate sport.

Farida Khalil of Egypt won World Championship medals in Pentathlon and Obstacle Racing in 2025 and 2026

The overlap between modern pentathlon and obstacle racing is also reflected in athletes' results. Egyptian pentathlete Farida Khalil won gold at the Modern Pentathlon World Championships in 2025 and silver in 2026, alongside individual medals at the Obstacle World Championships in both years.

== Mass participation ==
Commercial obstacle races combine running with natural or artificial obstacles, and vary in the emphasis they place on competition, endurance, teamwork and recreation. The expansion of Tough Mudder, Spartan Race, Warrior Dash and similar series during the early 2010s created a large recreational participant base.

Competitive and recreational obstacle racing overlap. International championships use standardised distances, obstacle specifications and rules, while commercial mass-participation events vary considerably in course length and design.

== Safety and injuries ==
As with other sports involving running, jumping and climbing, obstacle sports carry a risk of injury. Reported injury rates vary according to the type of event, course design, terrain and the population studied.

Published studies have reported varying injury rates in mass-participation obstacle course races. A 2018 study of 73,366 participants at 33 races in Canada recorded 1,782 injuries, an average rate of 2.4 percent. Of these, 93.9 percent were treated on site, while 1 percent of recorded injuries required transport to an emergency department by emergency medical services. A 2019 review of medical provision at obstacle course races noted that the proportion of participants requiring medical attention was comparable with that reported at other mass-participation sporting events, including marathons and triathlons.

Injury patterns vary between formats and populations. A 2024 systematic review identified musculoskeletal and knee injuries among the risks associated with recreational and military obstacle courses, particularly where obstacles involved high-impact landings or rapid deceleration.

Organised obstacle competitions also incorporate measures intended to reduce the consequences of falls. UIPM competition standards require protective matting beneath obstacles and on landing platforms, with thicker mats used to provide impact attenuation in areas where falls from height may occur.

== Relationship with entertainment ==
SASUKE and its Ninja Warrior adaptations introduced obstacle competition to large television audiences and popularised obstacle designs later used in training and organised competition. During its testing and adoption by modern pentathlon, the obstacle discipline was widely compared to Ninja Warrior.

The UIPM–TBS agreement of 2026 formalised part of this relationship by allowing TBS-designed SASUKE elements to be used in the obstacle discipline.

== See also ==
- Modern pentathlon
- Ninja Warrior
- Sasuke (TV series)
- World Obstacle
- Obstacle course racing
- Adventure racing
- Military pentathlon
