= Frontier Adventure Sports & Training =

Frontier Adventure Sports & Training Inc.
- Industry: Adventure Sports
- Founder: David Zeitsma (1997)
- Headquarters: Burnaby, BC, Canada
- Services: adventure sports training and competitions
- Owner: Geoff Langford (since 2002)
- Divisions: Raid the North Extreme, Raid the North, Frontier Adventure Challenge, Camp Frontier
- Website: www.raidthenorth.com

Frontier Adventure Sports and Training (FAST) is the most established^{needs citation} adventure race organizer in Canada, in operation since 1997. Frontier Adventure Sports has established an international reputation for solid logistics and challenging racecourses. FAST hosts events under several banners: the Frontier Adventure Challenge, Raid the North and Raid the North Extreme. These non-stop races range in length from 8 hours to six days and require coed teams of three or four to hike, mountain bike, paddle and negotiate fixed ropes, while navigating an unmarked racecourse through the wilderness.

== Adventure racing ==
Adventure racing can be defined as a non-stop, multi-day, multi-discipline, team event. In many ways it can be likened to an expedition with a stopwatch. The goal of the competition is to be the first team to get all members across the finish line together. Adventure racing requires teamwork, perseverance, and strong navigation and wilderness survival skills. The most common disciplines involved in an adventure race are mountain biking, hiking, paddling and rappelling. There are many different lengths and formats of events, ranging from off-road triathlons, to month-long expeditions. The course should take competitors through remote wilderness where they must travel without outside assistance. Each team must use strategy to determine the best route, equipment, food and pace to maintain to win.

== Raid the North ==
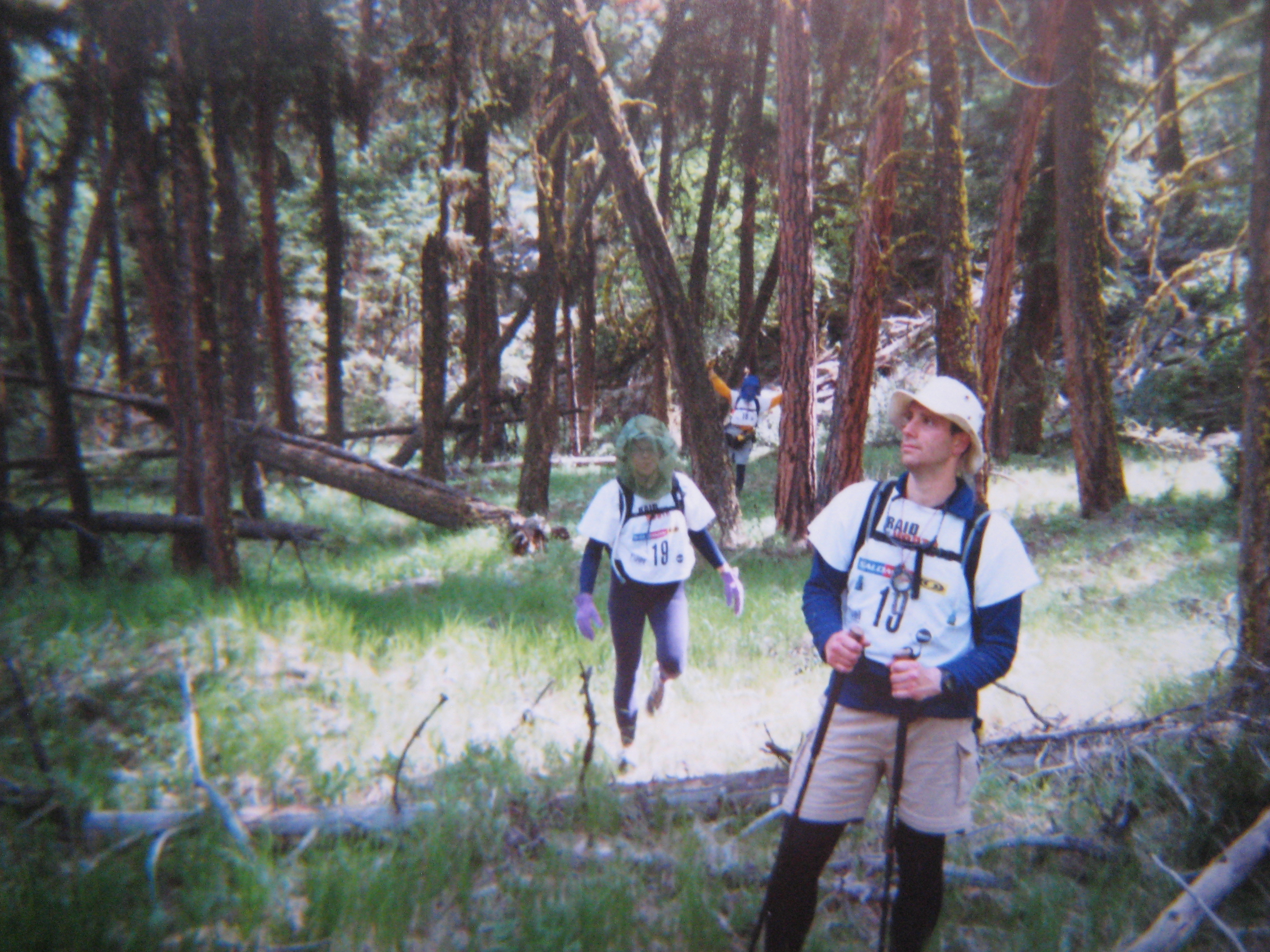
Team The Big Fish, Penticton B.C.

Since 1997, Raid the North events have been designed to highlight the natural elements of the host region environment. The Raid the North Race Series consists of a national series of 36-hour races in various locations across Canada, during which teams will cover between 130 and 150 kilometers. A Raid the North Team is a co-ed group of four people with a variety of sport, outdoor and wilderness backgrounds. Unlike RTNX, Raid the North events are geared towards the prepared first time adventure racer.

== Raid the North Extreme ==
Raid the North Extreme (RTNX) is a 6-day expedition-style adventure race. It was held once per year from 1999 to 2004, and since then has been held every three years. Strong navigation skills and wilderness experience are required as the course covers roughly 500 kilometers of unmarked terrain. Each year the race travels to a different region in Canada that provides rugged wilderness challenges for competitors.

Raid the North Extreme was one of the original founding members of the Adventure Racing World Series and a qualifier race for the AR World Championship. Raid the North Extreme was selected as the Adventure Racing World Championships in 2004. RTNX was included in the 2011 World Series.

Raid the North Extreme is designed for experienced adventure racers, or those with significant wilderness experience, as there are significantly long sections of remote wilderness where rescue is difficult. Mixed gender teams of four have up to 6 days (non-stop) to cover 450 kilometres by trekking, mountain biking, paddling, and mountaineering. Competitors must navigate their own route through checkpoints throughout the racecourse. It is the only expedition-style event longer than 48 hrs in Canada.

Raid the North Extreme competitors come from across Canada and the United States and tend to have a broad multi-sport experience and/or extensive outdoor skills. International race competitors have come from Mexico, Argentina, Spain, France, Finland, New Zealand and Singapore.

Raid the North Extreme has previously been hosted by Elliot Lake, ON in 1999, Revelstoke, BC in 2000, Newfoundland and Labrador in 2001, Whitehorse, Yukon Territory in 2002, Atikokan, ON in 2003, Newfoundland and Labrador in 2004, Prince Rupert and Haida Gwaii, BC in 2007 and BC's West Kootenay in 2011.

Each race highlights the unique history, untouched wilderness and culture of the host region, including First Nations hunting and trading routes as well as other historic sites.

=== RTNX Locations and Top 5 Finishers ===
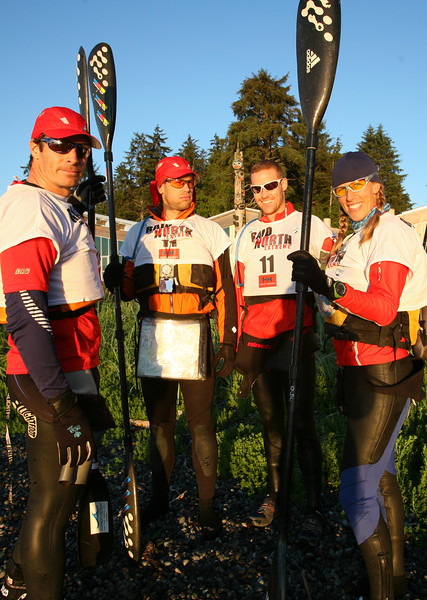
Team Intrepid Travel at the start line of Raid the North Extreme - Prince Rupert & Haida Gwaii, BC, 2007

2011: West Kootenay, BC

1. WildernessTraverse.com
2. Wild Rose
3. DART-nuun-SportMulti
4. Atmosphere/MOMAR
5. GearJunkie/YogaSlackers

2007: Prince Rupert/Haida Gwaii, BC

1. Sole
2. DART-nuun
3. yukonWILD
4. SSS (Spirit, SleepMonsters.ca, Shine-Energy)
5. Playground Bullies

2004: Corner Brook, NL (AR World Championships)

1. Nike ACG / Balance Bar
2. Cross Sportswear
3. Merrel Zanfel Adventures
4. Nokia
5. Mazda

2003: Atikokan, ON

1. EADS
2. Spirit
3. Fudugazi
4. Wild Rose
5. Phoenix

2002: Whitehorse, Yukon

1. Montrail
2. EasternOutdoors.com
3. GoLite
4. Spirit
5. TnT

2001: Corner Brook, NL

1. Salomon/Eco-Internet
2. Nokia Adventure
3. Redbull-PlayStation
4. Eastern Outdoors.com-GLAR
5. Spirit

2000: Revelstoke, BC

1. Spirit
2. PHON_NET.COM
3. Old Spice Red Zone
4. Shic Shoc Merrel
5. Olympia

1999: Elliot Lake, ON

1. Salomon/Eco-Internet
2. Olympia
3. Timbuk 2
4. Nomad
5. Lycos

== Economic impact ==
Raid the North Extreme creates broad tourism promotion for each region it visits, via media coverage and word of mouth. Documentaries on the race have been aired on the Outdoor Life Network, TSN, the Global Television Network, and PBS. RTNX also has a significant economic impact on the host region, creating an estimated local boost of $2.3 million.

== Camp Frontier ==
Frontier Adventure Sports hosts an extensive adventure racing training curriculum focusing on the skills and knowledge required to compete in adventure racing. In partnership with Esprit Rafting, Frontier Adventure Sports offers the Jalcomulco AR Training Week as well as the Pico2Playa Expedition Training Week in Veracruz, Mexico. The Pico2Playa Expedition Week consists of a staged expedition from Pico de Orizaba to the Gulf of Mexico.

== History ==
In 1997, Eco-Challenge competitor Dave Zietsma wanted to bring expedition racing to Canada, and introduced the 36 hour Raid the North race event. Originally known as Frontier Adventure Racing, the company grew to include the 6 day expedition race, Raid the North Extreme, and an 8-hour series, the Salomon Adventure Challenge. In 2002, Frontier was purchased by Geoff Langford, who introduced 14-hour Adventure Challenge events, restructured the company as Frontier Adventure Sports & Training, and created the Camp Frontier brand offering week-long training camps in Mexico and Costa Rica.

Since its inception, Frontier has hosted over 100 race events in Canada. Frontier is most recognized for its 2007 Raid the North Extreme event held in Haida Gwaii and Prince Rupert, BC, broadcast nationally on the Global Television Network in Canada and on PBS in the US.
