= Arthur the King =

2024 film by Simon Cellan Jones

- Theatrical release poster
- Directed by: Simon Cellan Jones
- Screenplay by: Michael Brandt
- Based on: Arthur - The Dog Who Crossed the Jungle to Find a Home by Mikael Lindnord
- Produced by: Tucker Tooley; Mark Canton; Courtney Solomon; Tessa Tooley; Mark Wahlberg; Stephen Levinson
- Starring: Mark Wahlberg; Simu Liu; Juliet Rylance; Nathalie Emmanuel; Ali Suliman; Paul Guilfoyle
- Cinematography: Jacques Jouffret
- Edited by: Gary D. Roach
- Music by: Kevin Matley
- Production companies: eOne Films; Tucker Tooley Entertainment; Mark Canton Productions
- Distributed by: Lionsgate
- Release date: March 15, 2024
- Running time: 108 minutes
- Country: United States
- Language: English
- Budget: $19 million
- Box office: $40.8 million

Arthur the King is a 2024 American adventure film directed by Simon Cellan Jones, written by Michael Brandt, and starring Mark Wahlberg, Simu Liu, and Juliet Rylance. It is based on the true story told in the 2016 memoir Arthur - The Dog Who Crossed the Jungle to Find a Home by Mikael Lindnord. Inspired by events that actually took place during an adventure race in Ecuador, the film follows the captain of an adventure racing team who befriends a wounded stray dog named Arthur. The dog accompanies the team on a grueling 435-mile (700-km) endurance race, with the film adaptation relocating the story to the Dominican Republic.

The film was announced in 2019 as a Paramount Players release, but moved to Lionsgate in June 2020. Filming began in the Dominican Republic in January 2021, and the film was theatrically released on March 15, 2024. It received mixed-to-positive reviews from critics and grossed $40 million worldwide.

== Plot ==
In 2015 in Costa Rica, while competing in the Adventure Racing World Series, American runner Michael Light and his team get stuck on the first day after he makes the poor decision to kayak against the tide. Team member Leo is outraged that Michael disregarded their opinions.

In 2018, after a three-year lapse in his career, Michael is living in Colorado Springs and not satisfied with himself. Married to Helen, who had been on the 2015 team, and working for his father Charlie's realty, he wants to feel fulfilled. Looking at the viral Instagram post of that failure, his 19th attempt to win the race, Helen encourages him to get a team together and seek a sponsor.

Michael decides to race one more time with the hope of winning a race at last. He chooses two teammates: Olivia, a climber whose father made a career in the same discipline; and the older racer Chik, who had been dropped from a multi-winning Australian team due to a knee injury whose recovery is uncertain. However, his sponsor Broadrail offers half the money he asks for and imposes the fourth team member, Leo, who is now a social media celebrity, and whom Michael has not spoken to since the humiliating viral post.

Finding Leo in California, who is in a promotional photo shoot for his new line of clothing, Michael admits that his ego cost them the 2015 race. He promises to listen to the team this time.

The team flies from the USA to the Dominican Republic with only four days to acclimate and train for the 5-day race, as their sponsor would not invest more in them. 54 teams are competing, where the route passes through mostly mountainous jungle terrain. Each team chooses their own route to each checkpoint, and Chik is their navigator. The over-400 mile route includes trekking, climbing, biking, and kayaking.

Just before the race begins, Olivia confesses that she's there for her dad, as he has little time left due to pancreatic cancer. The first leg of the race is trekking. As they are resting at the first transition camp, Michael gives meatballs to a stray dog. During stages 2 and 3, an almost 200-mile all-terrain section, they rock climb with their bikes strapped to their backs. At transition area 6, the halfway point, the team rests 35 minutes rather than the allotted hour.

Now night-trekking in the jungle, they deal with heavy rain. An argument breaks out, where Michael reveals that he knew Chik's knee was not 100% and that Leo does not believe they can win. The dog interrupts, then saves the team from falling off a cliff, so they adopt him and call him Arthur, the King.

For the last part of the competition, while they are the race leader, they have to leave Arthur on shore to kayak on sea. As they see the dog is about to drown while following them, they go back and save him. The team is thus delayed and loses the race, arriving second.

Arthur collapses, and a veterinarian finds that he is severely infected by parasites, advising them to put him down, but Michael refuses. He takes Arthur to the USA, where he is saved and goes to live with Michael.

== Cast ==
- Mark Wahlberg as Michael Light
- Simu Liu as Leo
- Juliet Rylance as Helen
- Nathalie Emmanuel as Olivia
- Ali Suliman as Chik
- Bear Grylls as himself
- Paul Guilfoyle as Charlie
- Rob Collins as Decker
- Michael Landes as one of the broadrail executive
- Ukai as Arthur, the King, a stray dog

== Production ==
Baltasar Kormákur was initially going to direct the film, but dropped out due to schedule conflicts.

The casting of Mark Wahlberg was announced in July 2019. In December 2020, it was announced that Simu Liu, Ali Suliman and Rob Collins were cast in the film and that Simon Cellan Jones would replace Kormákur.

Paramount Players was initially attached as distributor, but left the film for unknown reasons and was replaced by Lionsgate in June 2020. Filming was planned to begin in Puerto Rico that fall. That December, it was reported that Lionsgate had also left the film.

Filming instead began in January 2021, in the Dominican Republic. In November 2023, Lionsgate had rejoined as a distributor and set a release date of March 15, 2024.

== Reception ==
=== Box office ===
In the United States, Arthur the King was released alongside The American Society of Magical Negroes and the wide expansion of Love Lies Bleeding, and was projected to gross $8–10 million from 3,003 theaters in its opening weekend. The film made $3 million on its first day, including $825,000 from Thursday night previews. It went on to debut to $7.5 million, finishing third at the box office.

=== Critical response ===
On the review aggregator website Rotten Tomatoes, 69% of 85 critics' reviews are positive, with an average rating of 5.9/10. The website's consensus reads: "It's hard to deny Arthur the King's ability to tug at the heartstrings, although it may have been more effective if it had taken a subtler approach." Metacritic, which uses a weighted average, assigned the film a score of 54 out of 100, based on 18 critics, indicating "mixed or average" reviews. Audiences surveyed by CinemaScore gave the film an average grade of "A" on an A+ to F scale, while those polled by PostTrak gave it 4.5 out of 5 stars, with 75% saying they would definitely recommend the film.

Nell Arthur of RogerEbert.com wrote, "It is really three movies in one, all watchable, but the pieces do not always mesh." Variety's Courtney Howard found that "If indelible Movie Moments are in short supply, inevitably making Wahlberg and Ukai's chemistry the true highlight, the film's sentiments on selflessness nonetheless stand out. They're a ringing testament to the powerful bond between man and dog, and a kind-hearted reminder that canine companionship can be a lifeline in troubled times." Katie Walsh of the Los Angeles Times commented, "Suffering may be Wahlberg's raison d'être, but this is a lighter and more uplifting mode for the actor, who clearly enjoys the extreme physicality of the performance, even if the emotional tenor is well within his established star persona. And if you’re a dog person, it will be impossible to resist the tale of Arthur and his knights of extreme sports."
