= Arthur (dog) =

Ecuadorian dog brought to Sweden

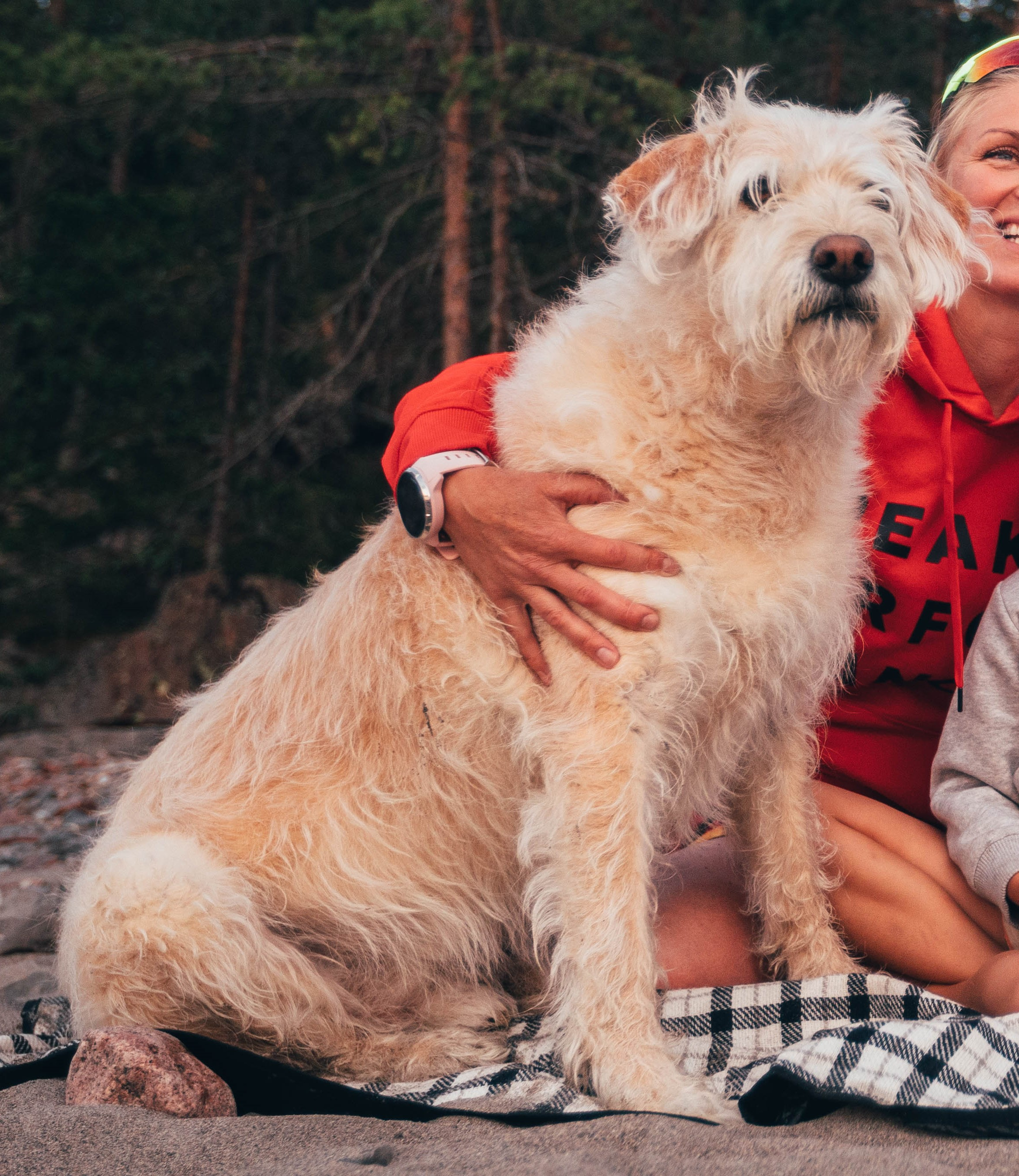
Arthur in 2019

Arthur (2007(?) – 8 December 2020) was an Ecuadorian dog who attached himself to a Swedish adventure racing team when they were competing in the Adventure Racing World Championship in 2014, and was then brought to Sweden.

== Adventure Racing World Championship ==
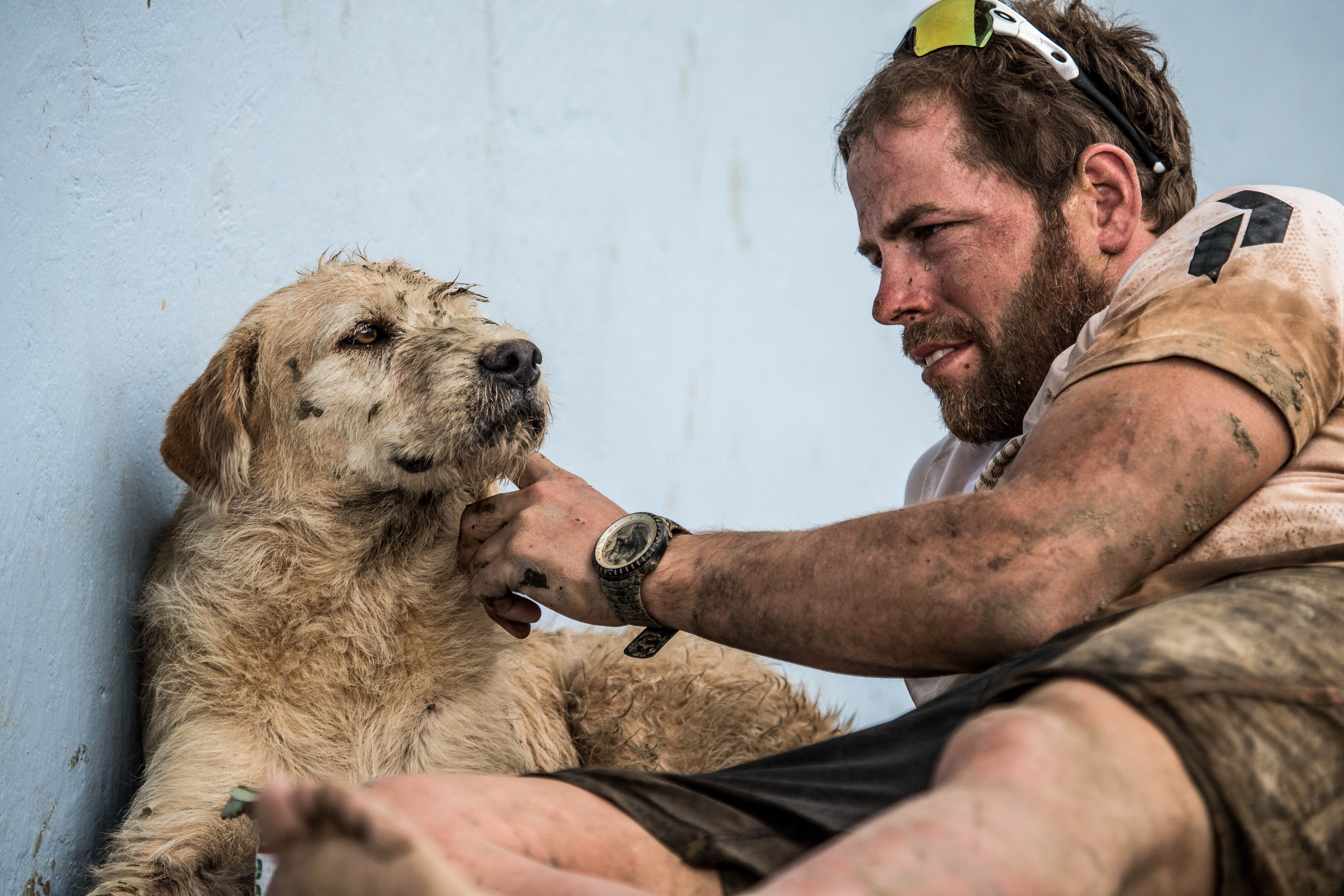
Mikael Lindnord and Arthur in Ecuador during the Adventure Racing World Championship 2014

In November 2014, Mikael Lindnord was in Ecuador as leader of the four-person Team Peak Performance, competing in the Adventure Racing World Championship in coastal Ecuador, when he offered a canned meatball to a village dog. The dog then followed the team for the rest of the race. He sometimes had to be hauled out of deep mud, and during the kayaking leg he jumped into the water and swam alongside until Lindnord hauled him aboard, after which he delayed the team by jumping back in after fish.

Lindnord named him Arthur after King Arthur of Britain, because of his royal appearance.

== Life in Sweden ==
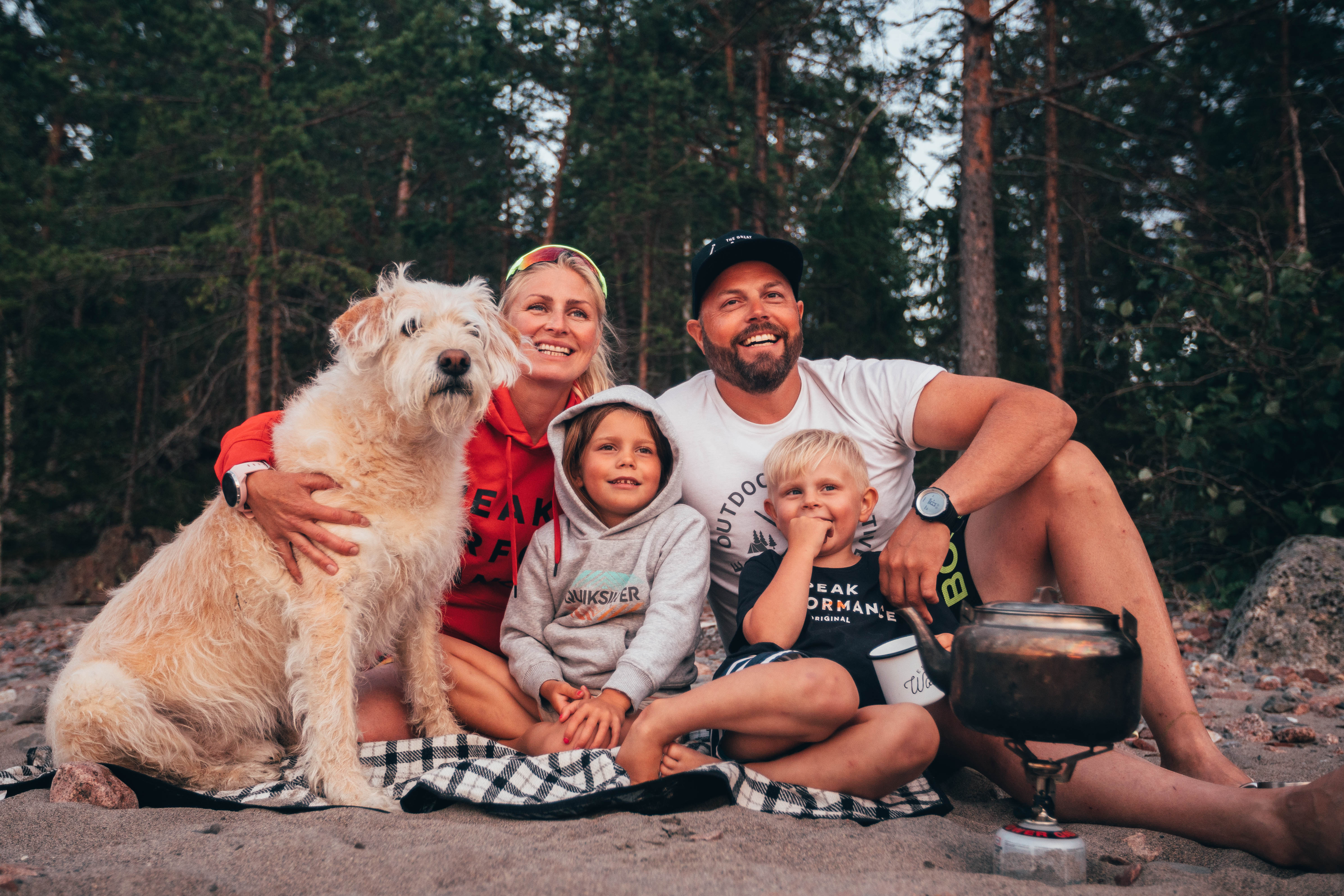
Arthur with his Swedish family

After a crowdfunding campaign started by the Swedish newspapers, Twitter campaign, received assistance from the Ecuadorian Minister for Social Affairs, and obtained permission from the Swedish Board of Agriculture, Lindnord was able to bring Arthur back to Sweden. Arthur required veterinary care and had to remain in quarantine for 120 days; in March 2015, after dental surgery, a "small operation" and a press conference, he went to live with Lindnord and his family in Örnsköldsvik. According to the Ecuadorian and Swedish veterinarians, Arthur was between five and seven years old when brought to Sweden.

In late November 2014, an Ecuadorian man told an Ecuadorian newspaper that Arthur was his dog, Barbuncho. Several people acquainted with the owner told Lindnord that he had actually taken the dog from a man and his family, but Lindnord then blamed them for being complicit in animal abuse. There was never any evidence of abuse, however; the dog lived in a rural, tropical area and was known to accompany his owner on hunting trips and treks with international tropical biologists and health professionals with whom the owner worked. After a petition was started by animal activists in Ecuador threatening violence towards and incarceration of the former owner, the owner and his acquaintances decided to back down to keep his family safe.

In May 2015, Arthur accompanied the team in the Wings For Life World Run in Kalmar.

Arthur was diagnosed with a malignant tumour and died on December 8, 2020.

== Book and film ==
Lindnord together with co-writer Val Hudson have written three bestseller books about Arthur. Arthur - The Dog Who Crossed the Jungle to Find a Home was published in 2016, Arthur and Friends was published in 2017 and Young Arthur - Inspired by the true story of Arthur, the rescue dog published in 2024.

A film, Arthur the King was released by Lionsgate on March 15, 2024. The screenplay is based on the book Arthur - The Dog Who Crossed the Jungle to Find a Home. Mark Wahlberg stars as Mikael Lindnord, while Helena Lindnord is being portrayed by Juliet Rylance. Other actors in the movie include Simu Liu, Nathalie Emmanuel, and Ali Suliman.

Though the story recounted in the books took place in Ecuador, the film was set and filmed in the Dominican Republic, leading to much disappointment and confusion among Ecuadorians, as reflected on X and social media venues when the film trailer was released.

== Legacy ==
A charity named after Arthur, "Arthur Foundation," was created to help street dogs. Arthur Foundation's priority was to support the LOBA law in Ecuador (Law of Animal Welfare – Ley Organica de Bienestar Animal). In April 2017 the LOBA law was approved and published and on April 12, 2018, the Organic Environmental Code including the LOBA law went into effect.
