= Mikael Lindnord =

Swedish former adventure racer

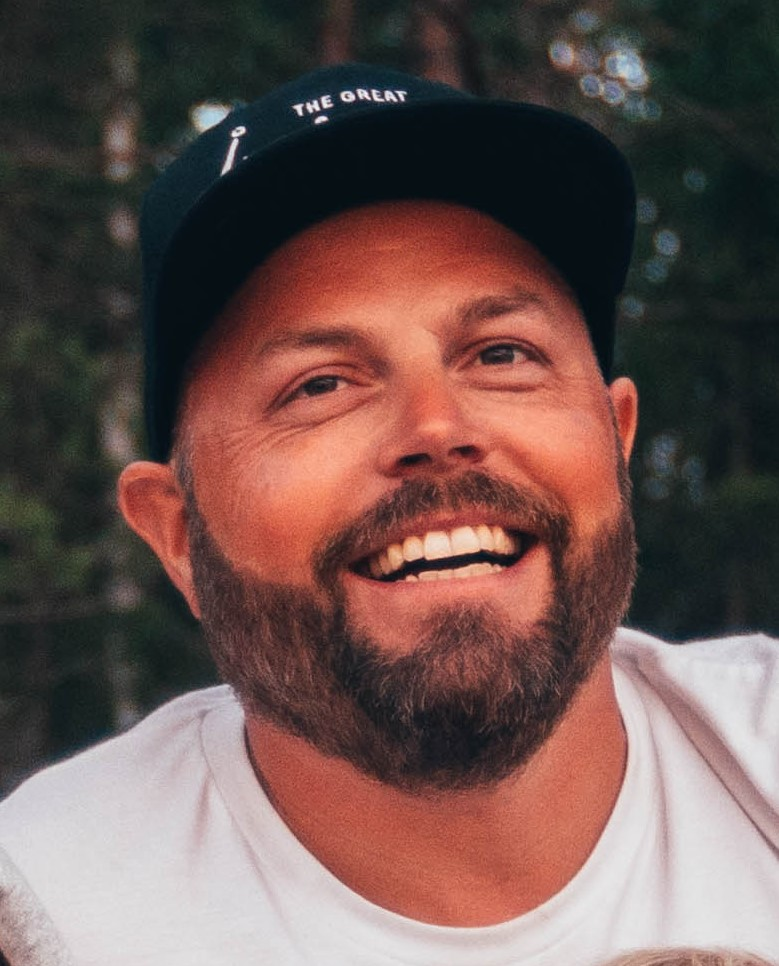
- Lindnord in 2019
- Born: September 24, 1976 (age 49); Salem, Sweden
- Education: Nolaskolan Gymnasium 1993 -1995; I22 Lapplands Jägarregemente 1996-1997; Racklöfska Skolan 1998-1999
- Occupations: Former adventure racer, author, director, coach, lecturer and entrepreneur
- Spouse: Helena Lindnord
- Children: 2

Mikael Lindnord (born September 24, 1976) is a Swedish former elite athlete, author, director, coach, lecturer and entrepreneur.

Lindnord's career as an adventure racer started in 1997 and lasted almost across two decades before he retired in 2015. Lindnord was the captain of the first Swedish team to win an ARWS event during the 2010 competition in Costa Rica.

Besides racing, Lindnord was race director for ARWS/Explore Sweden between 2004-2010 and ARWC 2006 in Sweden and Norway.

While competing in Ecuador for the ARWS World Championships in 2014, he gave some meatballs to a dog he assumed was stray, but who actually lived with an Ecuadorian man. The dog, later named Arthur by Lindnord, followed him and his team the rest of the race. The ESPN documentary about Arthur shows Lindnord, the adventure racing team and how they met Arthur.

== Contribution ==
The Arthur Foundation operated from 2014 to 2018, with its primary focus on endorsing the LOBA law (Organic Law of Animal Welfare – Ley Organica de Bienestar Animal).

This law aimed to establish standards of animal welfare across various contexts, including consumption, companionship, labor, trade, experimentation, and entertainment. The legislation's key objective was to reduce animal suffering by eradicating violence and fostering empathy towards animals. Additionally, the law aimed to humanely control animal populations by encouraging adoption, sterilization, and promoting responsible coexistence.

== Bibliography ==
- 2016 Arthur - the dog who crossed the jungle to find a home a non-fiction book published in 23 countries
- 2017 Arthur and Friends: The incredible story of a rescue dog, and how our dogs rescue us
- 2024 Young Arthur - Inspired by the true story of Arthur, the rescue dog.

=== Adaptations ===
The 2024 film Arthur the King, directed by Simon Cellan Jones, is based on Arthur - The Dog Who Crossed the Jungle to Find a Home. It stars Mark Wahlberg as an Americanized version of Lindnord named Michael Light, Simu Liu as Liam, and Juliet Rylance as Michael's wife Helena.

== Awards ==
- Hall of Fame – Adventure Racer 2023: "For his contribution to the sport of Adventure Racing and Adventure Racing World Series (ARWS)". Issued by Heidi Muller – CEO of Adventure Racing World Series.
- Honour Award – the city of Quito 2019: Issued by Dr. Jorge Yunda Machado – Major of Quito, Ecuador.
- Honour Award – the city of Guayaquil 2019: Issued by Cynthia Viteri Jiménez – Major of Guayaquil, Ecuador.
- Stadens Nyckel Örnsköldsvik (The key to the city of Örnsköldsvik, Sweden). Örnsköldsviks kommuns Hedersstipendium nr 13 - 2016.Utfärdat av Anna Sundberg, Kultur- och Fritidsnämndens Ordf.
- Årets Västernorrlänning 2014: Voted by P4 Västernorrlands (Swedish radio station) listeners 2014. Issued by P4 Sveriges Radio in February 2015

== Adventure racing teams ==
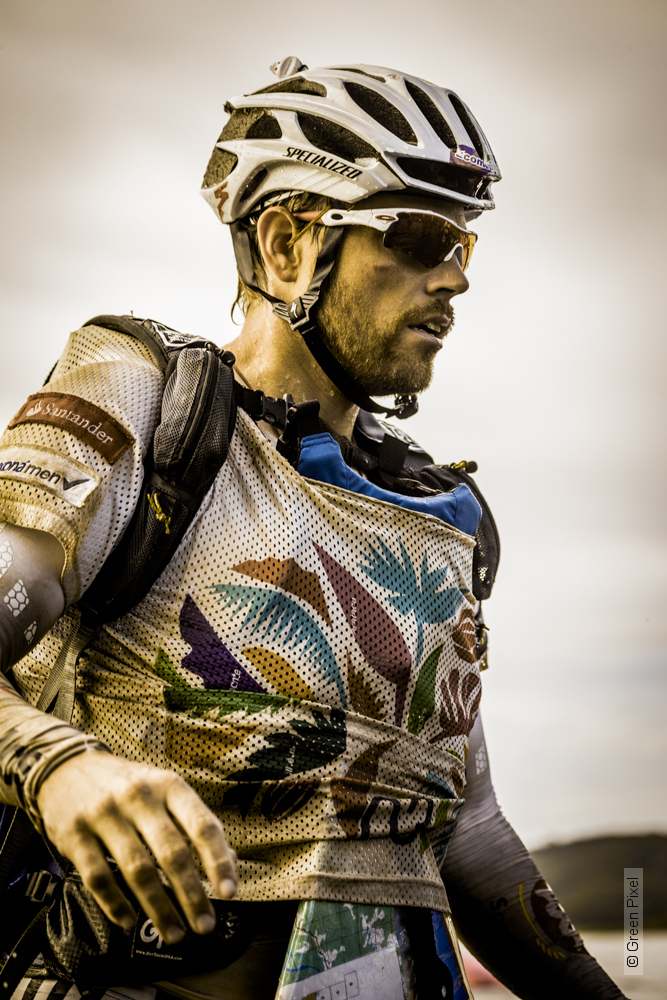
Lindnord during an Adventure Race in 2013

Team	Years
Team Peak Performance	2014-2015
AXA-Adidas	2012-2013
AXA Sportsclub	2011
Team Explore	2009-2010
Halti Adventure	2005-2007
Litepac	2002-2004
Reebok Adventure	1999-2001
Karrimor	1997-1998
