= X-Venture =

Defunct adventure race

The short-lived X-Venture adventure race was a feature of ESPN's X-Games. The first event, held in 1995, served as the second Eco-Challenge event after Eco-Challenge Maine. Each X-Venture featured 15 teams. The three-person co-ed teams travelled between 300 and 500 miles. Unlike most American-based events, the X-Venture race was held in stages, allowing any team that completed the stage in less than 24 hours to rest until the next stage began. Any team that was six hours or more behind the lead at the end of a stage would be eliminated from the race.

== The races ==
=== 1995 - New England ===
The 1995 event started in Maine and finished in Newport, RI. Team Threadbo, featuring John Jacoby, Jane Hall, Rod Hislop, Novak Thompson and Andrew Hislop, won the inaugural event. The event was presented as the second Eco-Challenge.

2nd - (featuring Angelika Casteneda) Twin Team. Angelina Castaneda, Adrian Crane, Whit Rambach, Marshal Ulrich, Tom Possert.

3rd - Team Eco-Internet (Ian Adamson, John Howard, Keith Murray, Robert Nagle, Kathy Sassin-Smith)

=== 1996 - New England ===
After a six-day, 350-mile race, the 1996 Event finished in a sprint, with Team Kobeer beating Team Eco-Internet by one second.

1st - Team Kobeer (Angelika Casteneda, John Howard, and Keith Murray)
2nd - Team Eco-Internet (Ian Adamson, Robert Nagle, Viven Prince)
3rd - Team Mirage
4th - Team Borah
5th - Team Presido

=== 1997 - Baja California, Mexico ===
Beginning in Mexicali, Mexico, the winning team travelled six days and 311 miles before crossing the finish line in San Diego, California. Don Baker served as race director.

1st: Presidio Adventure Racing Academy (John Howard, Andrea Spitzer, and Ian Adamson)
2nd: Team Endeavor
3rd: Red Hot
