= Fusil =

Fusil may refer to:

- Fusil, a light flintlock musket used by a fusilier
- Fusil (heraldry), a heraldic ordinary similar to a lozenge
- Gerald Fusil, creator of the Raid Gauloises adventure race
- Duopyramid, a kind of polytope
