= Ian Adamson (adventure racer) =

American adventure racer

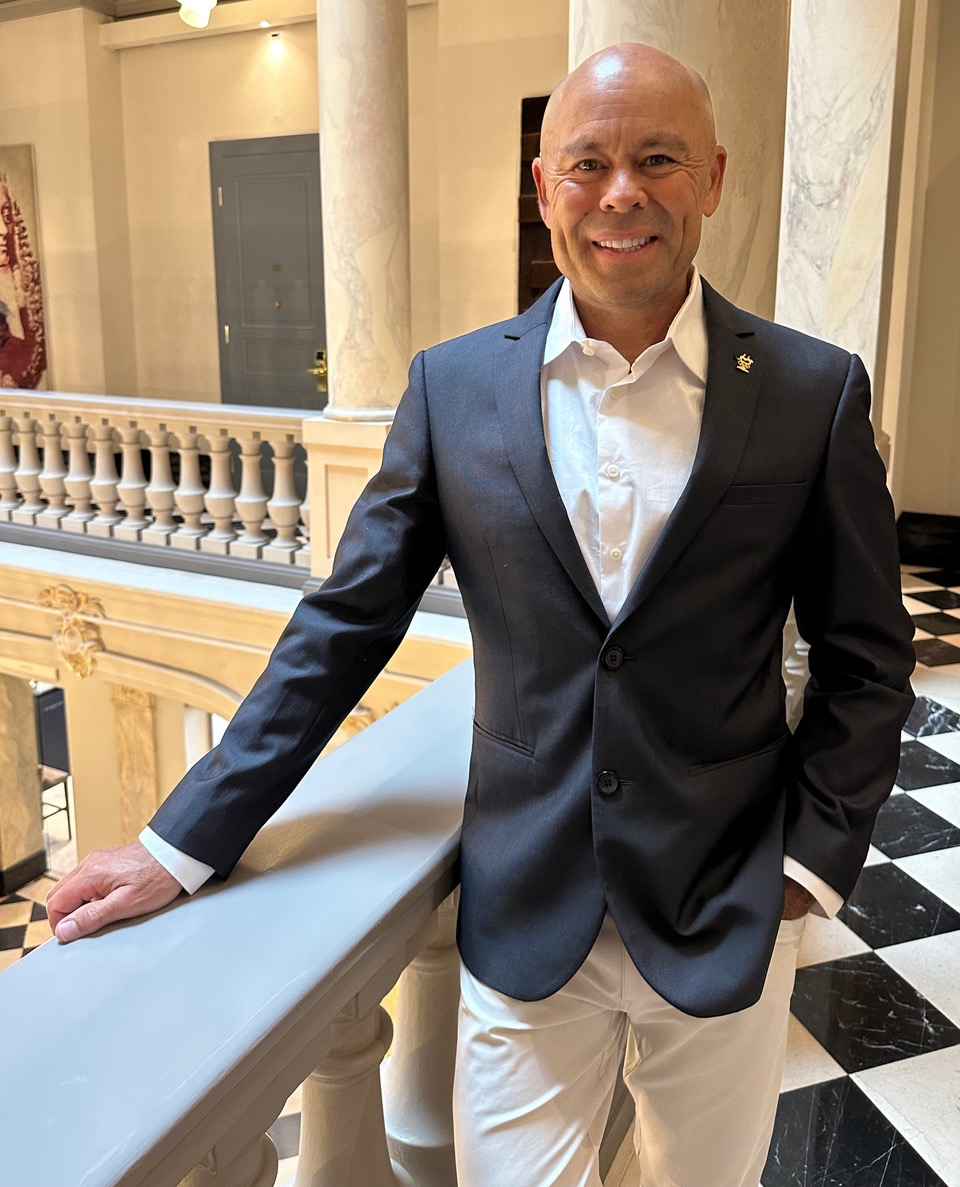
- Born: August 29, 1964 (age 62); Sydney, Australia
- Occupations: sports professional, former elite adventure racer

Ian Adamson
Medal record

Adventure Racing

Representing United States

Adventure Racing World Championships
Bronze medal – third place	1995 X-Games 1	Rhode Island
Silver medal – second place	1996 X-Games 2	Rhode Island
Gold medal – first place	1996 Eco-Challenge	British Columbia
Gold medal – first place	1997 X-Games 3	San Diego
Silver medal – second place	1997 Eco-Challenge	Australia
Gold medal – first place	1998 Raid Gauloises	Ecuador
Gold medal – first place	2000 Eco-Challenge	Borneo
Gold medal – first place	2001 Eco-Challenge	New Zealand
Silver medal – second place	2001 ARWC	Switzerland
Bronze medal – third place	2002 Primal Quest	Telluride
Silver medal – second place	2002 Eco-Challenge	Fiji
Gold medal – first place	2003 Primal Quest	Lake Tahoe
Gold medal – first place	2004 Primal Quest	Orcas Island
Gold medal – first place	2004 ARWC	Canada
Gold medal – first place	2004 Raid Gauloises	Argentina
Silver medal – second place	2005 ARWC	New Zealand
Bronze medal – third place	2005 Raid Gauloises	Europe
Gold medal – first place	2006 Primal Quest	Moab
Gold medal – first place	2006 ARWC	Sweden

Ian Adamson (born August 29, 1964) is an Australian- American sports professional and former elite adventure racer. He is an event and television professional and president of World Obstacle, the Fédération Internationale de Sports d’Obstacles (FISO).

== Biography ==
Adamson was born in Sydney, Australia. He earned a degree in Mechanical Engineering from the University of Sydney and later completed a Master of Science in Sports Medicine at Chapman University in Orange, California.

While at university he focused on canoe and kayak, winning the Australian Universities Canoe Championship in C2 Wild Water in 1988.

== Career ==
Adamson began participating in competitive endurance sports in the 1980s, with a background in track, cross-country running, Nordic skiing, kayaking, triathlon, and orienteering.

Over the course of his racing career, Adamson won Gold, Silver, and Bronze medals at the X-Games, adventure racing world championship titles and earned wins in events including the Eco-Challenge, Raid Gauloises, Primal Quest, and the Adventure Racing World Championships.

In 2004, Adamson set a Guinness World Record in endurance kayaking by covering 262 miles in 24 hours on the Yukon River in Canada. He had previously held similar records in 1997 and 1998.

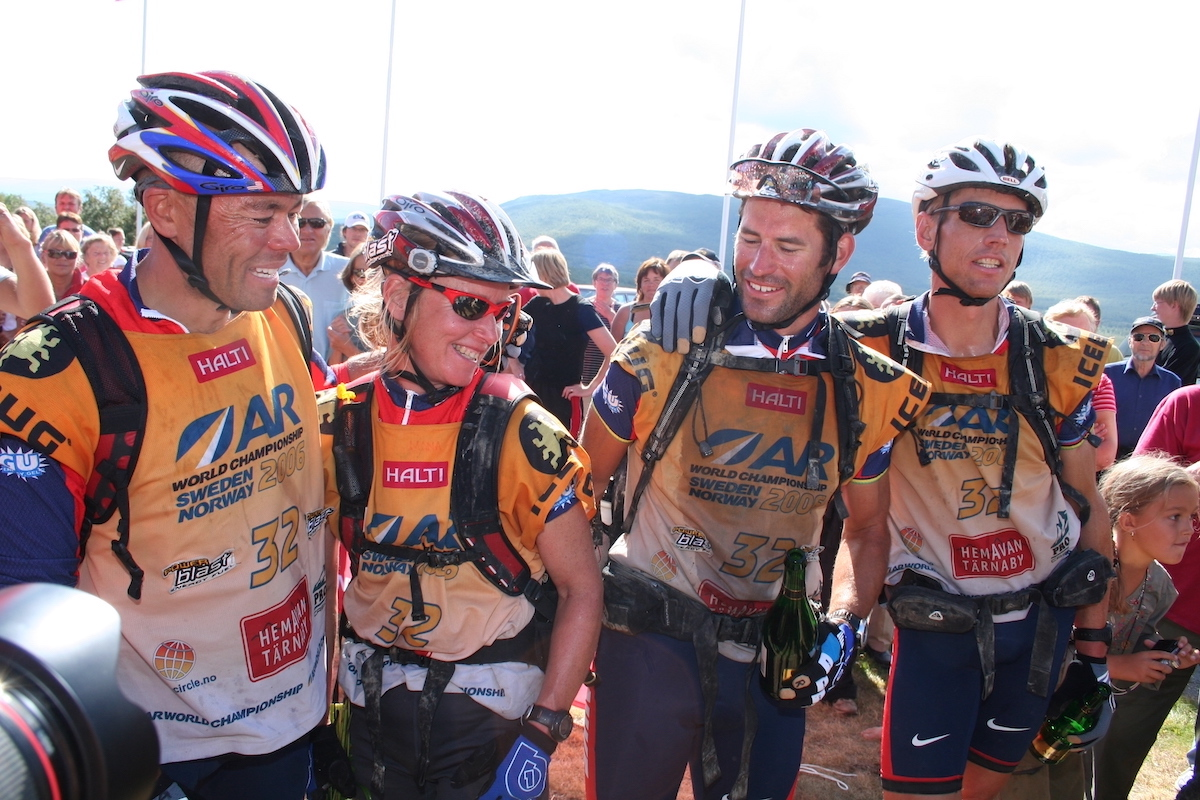
2006 Adventure Race World Champions Adamson (left) with Monique Merrill, Richard Ussher and Dave Wiens

He is a six-time Guinness World Record holder in categories such as endurance kayaking and obstacle sports. After retiring from professional racing, he continued competing at the masters level, securing age-group world championship titles in modern pentathlon disciplines, including biathle, triathle, Ninja, and obstacle racing between 2016 and 2024.

Adamson was a founding member of Team Nike (formerly Eco-Internet), one of the most successful adventure racing teams of its era, which achieved over 100 championship wins.The team competed in televised events including Eco-Challenge, Primal Quest, Outdoor Quest, and Raid Gauloises from 1995 through 2007 and was sponsored by brands such as Salomon and Nike.

On 19 September 2021, Ian Adamson was among the 34 competitors who completed the world's highest obstacle course race (OCR) at an altitude of 5,714 metres (18,746.72 feet) on Mount Kilimanjaro, Tanzania.The event set the Guinness World Record for the highest altitude OCR. Adamson, a prominent figure in the obstacle racing and adventure sports community, joined athletes from around the world in this challenging feat at extreme elevation.

Adamson was among the participants in the obstacle course race that achieved the greatest ascent and descent—3.019 km (1.87 miles)—during an event in the Kumbu Valley, Nepal, on 10–11 November 2022. This event set a world record for the highest total elevation change in an obstacle course race.

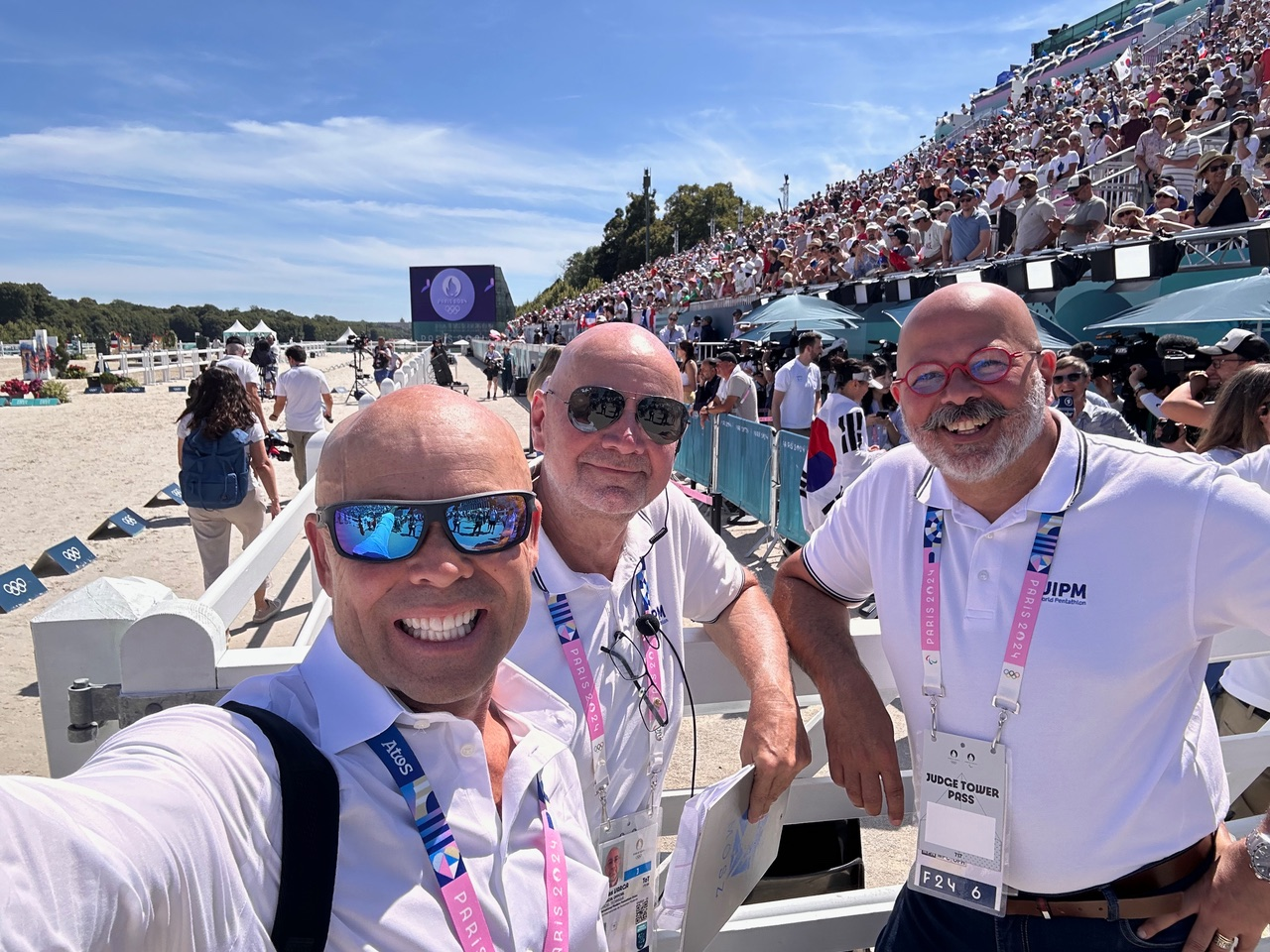

== Professional life ==
Following his retirement from competitive racing, Adamson became involved in sport governance. He is the founding president of World Obstacle, the international federation for obstacle sports, which includes disciplines such as obstacle course racing (OCR), Ninja, adventure racing, and calisthenics.

Adamson worked at Newton Running Company from 2007 to 2014 as Director of Product Development, and later Director of Medical & Education and previously in an advisory capacity as a sponsored athlete for GU, Giant Bikes, Nike(2002-2007).

From 1996 to 2003, Adamson served as a principal and executive at Presidio Adventure Training Academy in San Francisco and at Corporate Teams in Golden, Colorado. Since 1998, he has been a guest lecturer and presenter on business and international sport at institutions including the University of Colorado Boulder, University of Denver, Arizona State University, University of San Francisco, and the International Academy of Sport Science and Technology (AISTS), which was established by the International Olympic Committee and other International Sport Organizations.

Adamson also works as a forensic expert in sport and recreation-related legal cases. Drawing on his engineering and sports medicine background, he provides technical analysis and expert opinions in cases involving equipment, safety, and athletic performance.

His work in event production began in 1988 at the Australian University Canoe Championships. Internationally, he began directing large-scale multisport events in 1999, contracting with International Management Group (IMG) as a course and technical director. Since then, he has overseen the production of numerous sporting events and championships globally.

In television, Adamson has produced and consulted on a range of sports-related programs, including The Raft, Nature Island Challenge, American Tarzan, Million Dollar Mile, Primal Quest, Mild Seven Outdoor Quest, World Adventure Rafting Championships, Ninja World Championships, Obstacle World Championships, and OCR events at the Southeast Asian Games. His credits also include Ironman China, Modern Pentathlon World Cups, World Championship triathlon events, and the 4 Deserts ultramarathon series.

In addition to his sporting and media work, Adamson is a certified charter yacht and fleet captain, licensed to manage multihull and keelboat flotillas in coastal and open waters.

Adamson serves on the Board of Directors of USA Pentathlon Multisport, the U.S. National Governing Body for the Olympic sport of Modern Pentathlon, and on the Executive Board of USA Ninja Association.

In this role, he contributes to the oversight and strategic direction of the organization, supporting the development of multisport disciplines in alignment with Olympic standards.

== Filmography ==
- 2016 American Tarzan, Senior Race Coordinator, Discovery Channel
- 2015 Down East Kayak, Talent, NBC Sports
- 2015 Nature Island Challenge 3.0, Host, Outside Television
- 2015 The Raft, Logistics Producer (6 episodes), National Geographic Channel
- 2006 Primal Quest, Moab Utah, Cast, NBC Sports
- 2004 Primal Quest, San Juan Islands, Cast, CBS
- 2003 Primal Quest, Lake Tahoe, Cast, CBS
- 2002 Eco-Challenge Fiji, Cast, USA Network
- 2002 Primal Quest, Telluride, Cast, Outdoor Life Network
- 2001 Eco-Challenge New Zealand, Cast, USA Network
- 2001 World Championship Adventure Race Switzerland, Cast, Discovery Channel
- 2001 Men's Journal Adventure Classics (3 episodes), Executive Producer/Cast, Outdoor Life Network
- 2000 Eco-Challenge, Borneo, Cast, Discovery Channel
- 2000 Raid Gaulioses, Race Across the Himalayas, Cast, Outdoor Life Network
- 1999 Eco-Challenge, Argentina, Cast, Discovery Channel
- 1998 Raid Gauloises, Race Across Ecuador, Cast, Outdoor Life Network
- 1998 Mild Seven Outdoor Quest China, Cast
- 1997 X-Games III, San Diego, Cast, ESPN
- 1997 Eco-Challenge Australia, Cast, Discovery Channel
- 1997 Mild Seven Outdoor Quest, China, Cast
- 1996 X-Games II, ESPN
- 1996 Eco-Challenge British Columbia, Discovery Channel
- 1995 X-Games I, Eco-Challenge Maine, ESPN
- 1995 Eco-Challenge Utah, MTV

== Awards ==
- 2006 Men's Journal Adventurer of the year
- 2005 Adventure Race Team of the Year
- 2004 Adventure Race Team of the Year
- 2002 RailRider Adventurer of the year

== Works ==
- Author: Runner's World Guide to Adventure Racing
