= Arthur - The Dog Who Crossed the Jungle to Find a Home =

2016 memoir by Mikael Lindnord and Val Hudson

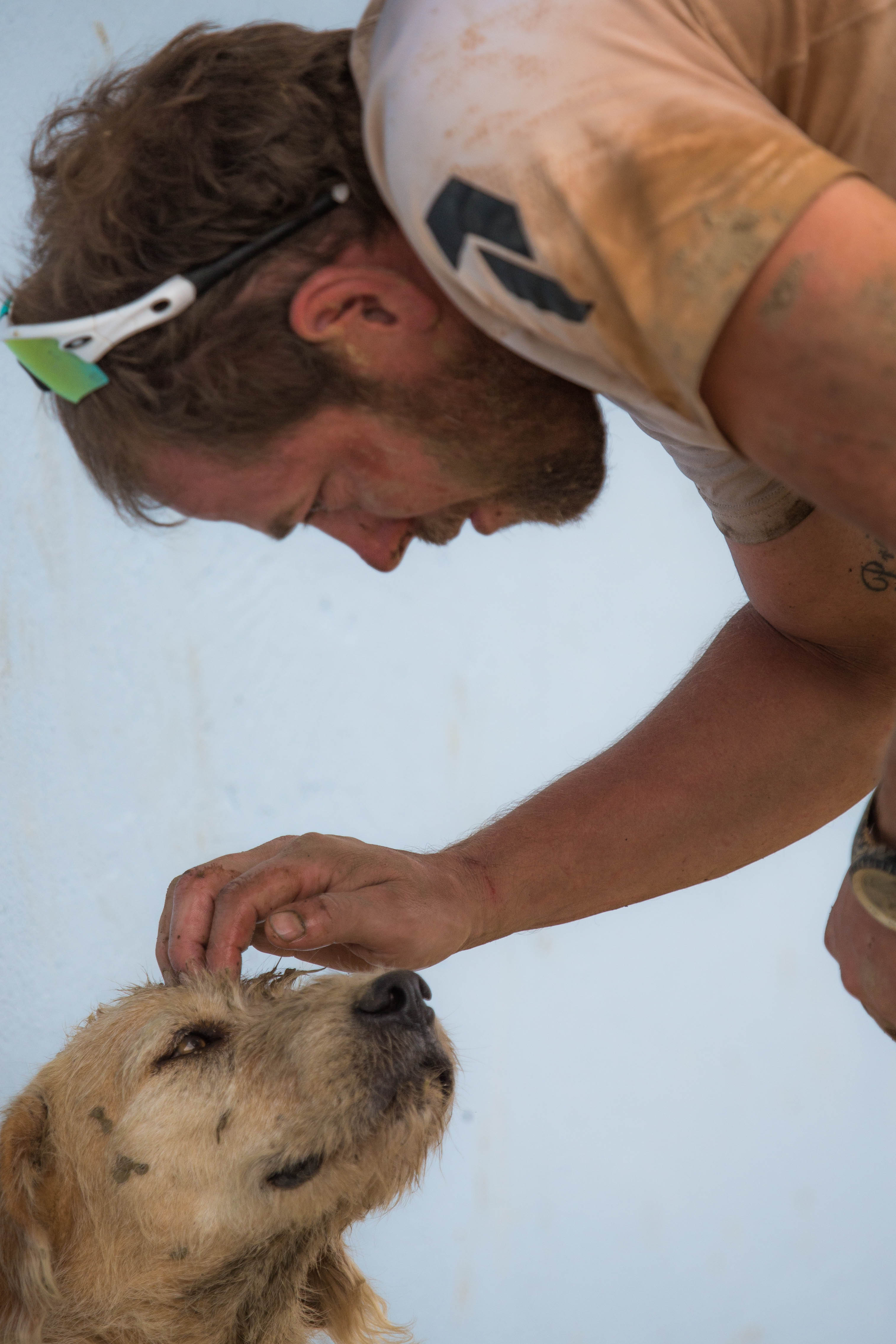
- Author: Mikael Lindnord; Val Hudson
- Language: English
- Genre: Biography
- Publisher: Two Roads
- Publication date: 19 May 2016

Arthur - The Dog Who Crossed the Jungle to Find a Home is a memoir written by Mikael Lindnord and Val Hudson, first published by Two Roads in the United Kingdom in 2016. It is the true story of one man and a dog who found each other during an adventure race in Ecuador.

The book has been translated into multiple languages and was adapted into the 2024 film Arthur the King by Lionsgate.

== Plot ==
As Mikael Lindnord leads his Swedish adventure racing team on a challenging 435-mile journey through the jungles and mountains of South America, an unexpected companion joins them for the last stretch of the trip when Mikael shares a meatball with a scruffy yet dignified mongrel. The team find themselves unable to shake off their newfound canine friend, as this dog had been used to following foreigners on medical brigades and research expeditions. However, as Lindnord's team face rivers, illnesses, injuries, exhaustion and some of the toughest terrain on Earth, Mikael thinks he has formed a strong bond with the dog, now named Arthur.

Their odyssey, documented with candid photographs and descriptive narration, highlights the connection that can develop between dogs and humans. After the team reaches the finish line, Mikael decides to adopt Arthur and bring him back to his family in Sweden, illustrating the companionship that formed between them.

In November 2014, an Ecuadorian man told a local newspaper that Arthur was his dog, Barbuncho. Several people acquainted with the owner told Lindnord that he had actually taken the dog from a man and his family, but Lindnord then blamed them for being complicit in animal abuse. There was never any evidence of abuse, however; the dog lived in a rural, tropical area and was known to accompany his owner on hunting trips and treks with international tropical biologists and health professionals with whom the owner worked. After a petition was started by animal activists in Ecuador threatening violence towards and incarceration of the former owner, the owner and his acquaintances decided to back down to keep his family safe.

== Adaptation ==
The book has been adapted into the film Arthur the King, directed by Simon Cellan Jones and starring Mark Wahlberg as "Michael Light" (a fictional version of Mikael Lindnord), Simu Liu as Liam and Juliet Rylance as Mikael/Michael's wife Helena. Though the story recounted in the books took place in Ecuador, the film was set and filmed in the Dominican Republic, much to the consternation and disappointment of many Ecuadorians who felt that they have not stood to benefit, despite the dog being taken from their country.
