= Eco-Challenge =

- Genre: Reality
- Created by: Mark Burnett
- Starring: Kathy Lynch; Ian Adamson; Sara Ballentyne; John Howard; Charlton Heston; Keith Murray; David Callaway; Andrea Murray; Michael Tobin; Jeff Leininger; Hunter Leininger; Tom Ambrose; Katie Ferrington; Joshua Forester; Caitlin Thorn; Jesse Tubb; Jesse Spangler; Kevin Howser; Shane Hagerman; Peter Jolles; Chris Von Ins; Michelle Hobson
- Country of origin: United States
- Original language: English
- No. of seasons: 10
- No. of episodes: 36

Production
- Executive producers: Mark Burnett; Lisa Hennessy
- Producer: Tim Powell
- Production location: Various
- Editor: Brian Catalina
- Production company: Mark Burnett Productions

Original release
- Network: MTV
- Release: April 1, 1995
- Network: ESPN
- Release: June 21, 1995
- Network: Discovery Channel
- Release: June 1, 1996 – June 4, 1999
- Network: USA Network
- Release: June 1, 2000 – May 8, 2003

Eco-Challenge: The Expedition Race is a multi-day expedition length adventure race in which teams of four (five in the early years) competed. It originally aired on Discovery Channel from April 1, 1995, to April 11, 2002. Based closely on the Raid Gauloises adventure race, the broadcast of Eco-Challenge led to the popularity of adventure racing.

The race returned in September 2019, taking place in Fiji. The new series, under the title World's Toughest Race: Eco-Challenge Fiji, premiered on August 14, 2020 on Amazon Prime Video.

== Overview ==
Eco-Challenge is generally regarded as the genesis for modern-day reality television, and adventure documentary series launching the success of Mark Burnett and his subsequent television shows Survivor, The Apprentice, The Contender, Are You Smarter than a 5th Grader?, Shark Tank, The Voice, and many more.

Eco-Challenge was created in 1992 by Mark Burnett. Inspired by a Los Angeles Times article about Gerald Fusil's Raid Gauloises adventure race in Costa Rica, Burnett formed a team and competed in two Raid Gauloises events. Although his teams did poorly, Burnett decided to create a similar race in North America. When the race went international, Burnett purchased the rights from Fusil and set out to make the Eco-Challenge the world's premier adventure race.

The teams raced non-stop, 24 hours a day, over a rugged 300-mile (500 km) course, participating in such disciplines as trekking, whitewater canoeing, horseback riding, sea kayaking, scuba diving, mountaineering, camel-back riding, and mountain biking. Teams originally consisted of five members, but the team size was reduced to four members early in the event's history. A feature of the race is the mandatory mix of men and women for all participating teams.

The first Eco-Challenge was held on April 25, 1995, in the Utah desert and was held each year in a new locale until 2002. Burnett recently noted that he did not intend to hold another Eco-Challenge, but had considered selling the rights to it. In contrast, other expedition-length races, including Primal Quest and the Patagonian Expedition Race continue to be held.

Multiple winners (through 2020) include Ian Adamson (AUS / USA: 3x 1st, 2x 2nd, 1x 3rd & 4th), Mike Kloser (USA: 3x 1st, 1x 2nd), John Howard (NZL: 3x 1st, 1x 3rd), Keith Murray (NZL: 3x 1st, 1x 3rd), Neil Jones (NZL: 2x 1st, 1x 2nd), Nathan Faave (NZL: 2x 1st, 1x 2nd), Robert Nagle (IRL / USA: 2x 1st, 1x 3rd), Andrea Murray (NZL / USA: 2x 1st), and Sarah Ballantyne (USA: 2x 1st).

== Television history ==
Each Eco-Challenge was broadcast on cable television. The 1995 Utah race was shown as a 45-minute feature, produced by and broadcast on MTV. The 1995 Maine/New England event was broadcast in segments as part of the Extreme Games broadcast on ESPN. Starting in 1996, Eco-Challenge was aired on the Discovery Channel and the production enjoyed a significantly expanded budget. The 1996 British Columbia production, broadcast on the Discovery Channel won an Emmy Award.

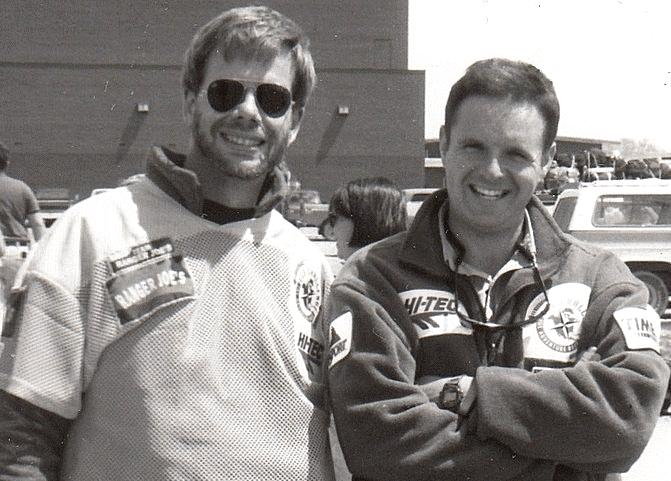
David Callaway and Mark Burnett during Eco-Challenge Utah in 1995

In 2000, the USA Network agreed to a three-year contract to broadcast the Eco-Challenge. Later that year, the show was nominated for a Prime-Time Emmy Award. USA did not renew the show after the 2002 Fiji race.

Although long out of print, the 1996 through 2001 Eco-Challenge races were released on VHS by Discovery soon after the shows aired. The Utah, Maine/New England, and Fiji episodes were never officially released in the United States.

In 2011, Burnett sold Expedition Impossible, a reality show with a similar concept to Eco-Challenge, to ABC as a summer series. The new show debuted on June 30 of that year.

In 2019, the show was revived under the title of World's Toughest Race: Eco-Challenge Fiji, and it premiered on August 14, 2020 on Amazon Prime Video.

== Events ==
- 1995 Utah Team Hewlett-Packard from France was the winning team.
- 1995 Maine/New England (as part of the X-Games X-Venture adventure race). Team Aussie from Australia was the winning team. Twin Team (USA) was second, Eco-Internet 3rd.
- 1996 British Columbia: Locations along the race included the Lillooet River, Carpenter Lake, Pemberton Icefield, and the Elaho River. Teams Eco-Internet (captain Ian Adamson with John Howard), Hi Tec, and Hewlett-Packard were in close contention for winning, but Eco-Internet passed a dark zone at an icefall that the other two teams missed; the other two teams decided to finish in second together. The program also followed Team Houston, a first-time team of lawyers; Team Sun Precautions, among whose members was Helen Klein, a 73-year-old ultramarathon racer; and Team S.C.A.R.(Santa Cruz Adventure Racers).
- 1997 Australia: Locations along the race included Undara Volcanic National Park, the Herbert River, Blencoe Falls, the Tully River, and Mount Bartle Frere. Team Eco-Internet (captain John Howard) won again, with Team Pure Energy Australia coming in second only 1 hour and 40 minutes behind (captain Ian Adamson) and Canterbury New Zealand 3rd. Teams also followed by the program included the returning Team S.C.A.R., Northern Irish Team Dalriada, and the Japanese Team East Wind, which was notable for physically carrying one of their team members over Mount Bartle Frere after an ankle injury.
- 1998 Morocco: The race began along the coast of Essaouira, through the high Atlas Mountains, and ended in Marrakesh. Team Vail (USA, Captain Billy Mattison) won. This is the first time an American team wins Eco Challenge. Team Aussie (Australia) came in 2nd and Team Cepos (Spain), who dominated the race until one of their members suffered altitude sickness, came in 3rd. Featured teams include Team Rubicon, a team composed of 3 female competitors, Team Navigator, a team trying to redeem themselves after requiring emergency evacuation close to the finish line the previous year, Team Mexico, a team of rude men who eventually learned to appreciate their talented female teammate, Team 2020, a cheerful Malaysian team who defied expectations, and Team Urban Edge, a rookie team of New Yorkers.
- 1999 Argentina was based from San Carlos de Bariloche in the Andes Mountains, starting in Patagonia Lakes region on Largo Nahuei Huapi. It included an ascent of Cerro Tronador and Team Greenpeace (NZL / Eco-Internet, Captain John Howard) was 1st. Spanish team Sierra Nevada was second and local team Condor was 3rd. Team Halti from Finland briefly took the lead but made a navigational error and fade to 5th behind 4th place Team Atlas Snowshoes Rubicon with three women (USA, Rebecca Rusch, Kathy Sassin, Robyn Benincasa, and Ian Adamson), who had held second place until the final mountain leg.
- 2000 Sabah, Borneo traversed the north east coast of Sabah, including the Gomantong Caves, old growth rain forests and coastal islands. Team Salomon Eco-Internet (USA captain Ian Adamson with Mike Kloser) was 1st, Spie Battignole (FRA) 2nd, Team Aussie 3rd
- 2001 New Zealand was based in the southern alps including Lake Wanaka and the Cook Glacier. No foreign team had won an adventure race on New Zealand soil (since the start of expedition racing in 1989) and Team Pure NZ was heavily favored to win. Team Nike (USA, was Eco-Internet, captain Ian Adamson with Mike Kloser), lacked the local knowledge of the favorites and played a tactical race to pass the Kiwis on the final night for the win. Team Pure NZ (Nathan Fa'avae, Cathy Lynch, Neil Jones, Jeff Mitchell) crossed the line for 2nd just 21 minutes later.
- 2001 U.S. Armed Forces Challenge (benefiting TAPS)

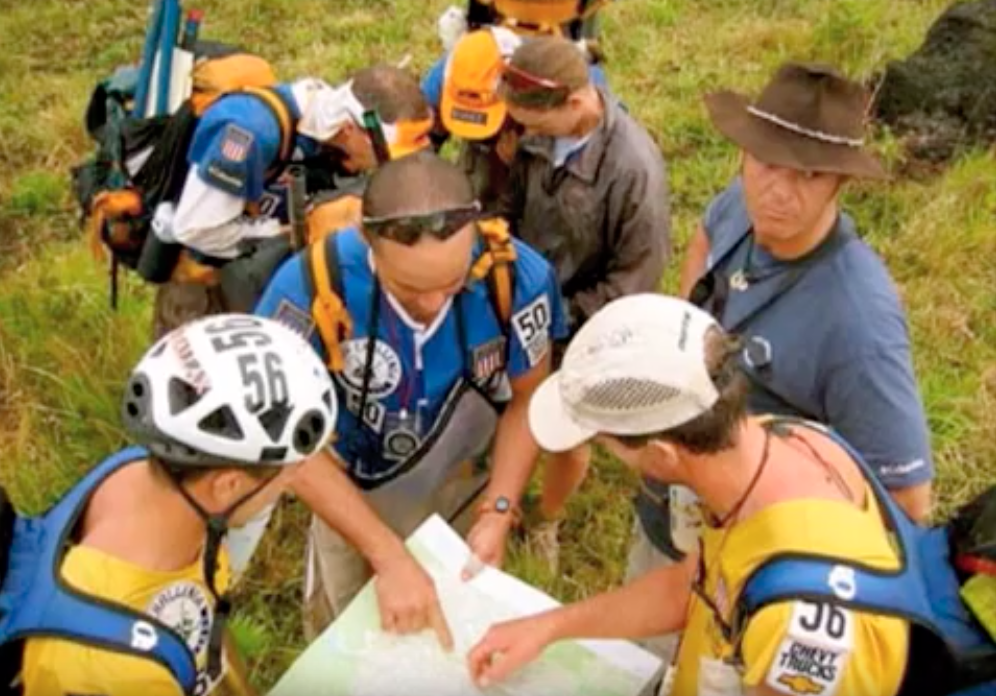
Ian Adamson and Mark Burnett at Eco-Challenge Fiji 2002

- 2002 Fiji was on the main island, Viti Levu, and traversed the highlands to the west coast and offshore islands. Team New Zealand (captain Nathan Faavae) and Team Nike (USA, captain Ian Adamson) passed Team Spain on Waya Island on the second last day. NZ broke away in rugged terrain on the Island and extended their lead on the ocean to win by several hours. Nike came in 2nd and Team Australia was 3rd.
- 2020 Fiji

== See also ==
- X-Games
- X-Venture
- Primal Quest
