= World Obstacle =

International sports governing body

Fédération Internationale de Sports d'Obstacles
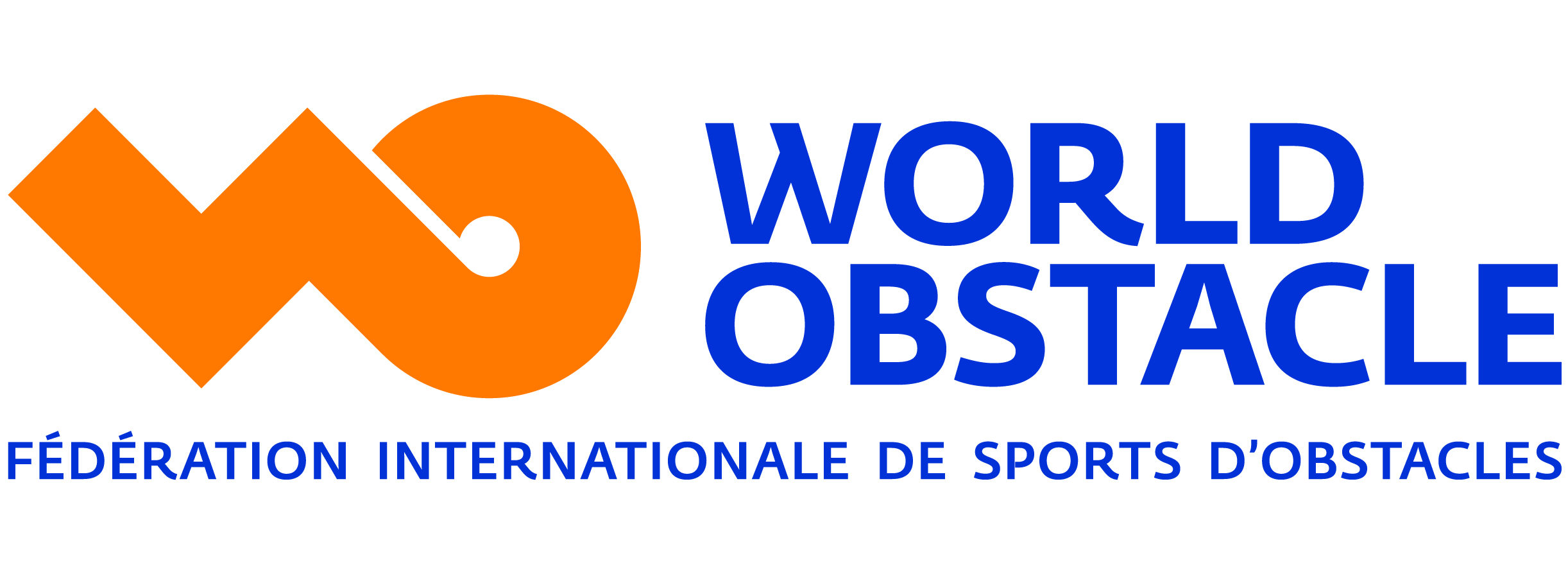
- Abbreviation: FISO
- Formation: 2014
- Location: Lausanne, Switzerland
- Region served: Worldwide
- Members: 107 National Federations
- Official language: English
- Website: www.worldobstacle.org

World Obstacle, institutional name Fédération Internationale de Sports d'Obstacles (FISO), is an international governing body for obstacle sports and related events. Disciplines include Ninja (similar to Sasuke and American Ninja Warrior) and obstacle course racing (OCR). Headquartered in Lausanne, Switzerland, it sanctions world and continental level events. In 2026, The organization voted to dissolve itself by 10 August, as the final step of an organizational integration with Union Internationale de Pentathlon Moderne, the governing body for modern pentathlon.

== History ==
The concept of an international governing body for obstacle course racing was originally proposed by Joe De Sena, the founder and owner of Spartan Race. This was announced in May, 2014 when world champion adventure athlete Ian Adamson accepted the job of leading the federation and sport, originally called the International Obstacle Racing Federation.

The organization filed as a Colorado non-profit sporting organization in early 2016 under the name the International Obstacle Sports Federation (IOSF). The decision was taken at the fourth congress to establish headquarters in Lausanne, Switzerland to better represent the majority of member federations and be close to Global Association of International Sports Federations (GAISF), World Anti-Doping Agency (WADA), Court of Arbitration for Sport (CAS), the majority of international sporting federations and the International Olympic Committee (IOC).

In February 2018, the organization filed in Switzerland as World OCR, (Note: Not to be confused with the World OCR founded in 2024, a separate international governing organization for OCR.) the Fédération Internationale de Sports d'Obstacles (FISO). FISO later began using the name World Obstacle.

Technology investor and media right entrepreneur Matthew Joynes was appointed the inaugural secretary general of FISO, in 2018.

Inclusion of full medal events in the 2019 Southeast Asian Games was approved in December 2018. The SEA Games are under regulation of the South East Asian Games Federation (SEAGF) with supervision by the IOC and the Olympic Council of Asia (OCA). Six nations expressed intention to participate in the event. Four nations medaled, Philippines (10), Malaysia (4), Indonesia (3) and Laos (1).

World Obstacle signed a memorandum of understanding (MoU) with the International Parkour Federation (IPF) in August 2020 to unify Obstacle Sports worldwide under a governance structure similar to World Aquatics (FINA), and constitution modeled on FINA and the World Baseball Softball Confederation (WBSC). The MoU expired in December 2020.

World Obstacle was officially granted observer status by the GAISF Council which convened in Lausanne on 27 September 2021. GAISF consists of Olympic and non-Olympic International Federations and is regarded as one of the first points of contact towards any sport's potential Olympic recognition.

World Obstacle has worked with the Union Internationale de Pentathlon Moderne (UIPM) on its replacement of show jumping with obstacle racing in the modern pentathlon. The two organizations signed a memorandum of understanding in 2023, and in 2025 FISO voted to begin an organizational integration into UIPM. In 2026, FISO voted to dissolve itself by 10 August 2026, with the integration of regional member organizations is set to continue into 2027.

== Members ==
World Obstacle divides the world into 4 continental confederations

World Obstacle members are composed of national member federations administering obstacle course racing in each country. Each national federation belongs to one of the four continental confederations. Each of the continental confederation offers a continental championship. As of 2022, the continental confederations are:

- The Obstacle Sports Federation of Africa (OSFA) – 12 national federations
- The Pan American Obstacle Sports Federation (PAOSF) – 22 national federations
- The Obstacle Sports Federation Asia Pacific (OSFAP) – 30 national federations with sub-continental regions including Obstacle Sports Federation South East Asia, Obstacle Sports Federation Central and Western Asia, and Obstacle Sports Federation East & South Asia and Pacific.
- The European Obstacle Sports Federation (EOSF) – 30 national federations**. Sub continental associations for Nordic Countries (Denmark, Finland, Norway, Sweden) and Central Europe (Czech Republic, Hungary, Poland, and Romania) were initiated in 2022.

* Sub-continental regions for Asia-Pacific were formalized the 2021 OSFAP Congress.

** Originally formed an association of European organisations prior to the 1st OCR European Championships June 10–11, 2016, EOSF was incorporated as the European Obstacle Sports Federation on 8 April 2017 at Olbia, Sardegna, Italy.

== Organization ==
The congress is the general assembly of the member national member federations and the highest authority of World Obstacle. The congress meets annually at a date and venue specified by the Executive Board and is the platform for representation of the needs and interests of the athletes.

World Obstacle's top-level executive branch, the central boards role is to supervise the practice of obstacles sports worldwide. It is composed of the president, the secretary-general, the treasurer, the president of each zone, one representative of each recognized league and two additional representatives from each zone. Zone representatives must include at least one female and one athlete, who can be the same person.

The executive committee manages the property and business of World Obstacle. The roles and responsibilities of the executive committee are to delegate the president and secretary feneral to handle routine business and carry out decisions made by executive committee.

The organization of World Obstacle includes the following commissions: Athletes, Governance, Legal, Medical, Para-athlete, Technical and Women's. All commissions report to the executive board, and all commission members have the right to attend executive board meeting. It is the responsibility of the members of each of the Commissions to support World Obstacle's efforts to develop obstacle course racing.

The organization of World Obstacle includes the following committees: Development, Ethics, Finance, Masters, Media, Officials, Safe Sport and Technology. Committees are advisory. It is the responsibility of the members of each of the Committees to support World Obstacle's efforts to develop obstacle course racing.

== Championships ==
World-level events sanctioned, organised or recognized by World Obstacle include:

- Medal events in the 2019 Southeast Asian Games
- Ninja World Championships
- UNAA Ninja World Series
- UNAA Ninja World Series Finals
- OCR European Championships
- OCR Asian Championships.
- OCR Pan American Championships
- Altitude OCR World Championships also call the World's Highest OCR
- Youth OCR World Championships
- University OCR World Championships
- Beach OCR World Championships
- Obstacle racing at the SEA Games

OCR Brand** World Championships include:

- Spartan Race World Championships
- World's Toughest Mudder
- OCR Series and World Finals
- Adventurey OCR World Championships

**Commercial entities producing "World Championship Events"

== See also ==
- Union Internationale de Pentathlon Moderne
