= Gérard Fusil =

Creator of the Raid Gauloises (born 1946)

Gérard Fusil (born in 1946) is the creator of the Raid Gauloises in 1989, widely considered the first modern adventure race. Fusil stopped working on the Raid in 1998 to start the Elf Authentic Adventure.
