= Raid Gauloises =

First modern expedition adventure race

The Raid Gauloise or The Raid is considered by many to be the first modern expedition adventure race and was first held in 1989 in New Zealand as "la grande traversée". Its creator, Gérard Fusil, took the existing concept of long distance endurance races like the Whitbred Round the World Yacht Race, and focused on the team aspects, requiring each competitor to be part of a five-person co-ed team supported by a two-person logistics crew. The Raid had no set course, with competitors being required to rely on their wits and judgment to reach the specified checkpoints. The Raid was named after its original sponsor, the Gauloises Cigarette Company.

Geoff Hunt and his expat French partner Pascale Lorre replicated the event as the Southern Traverse in 1991. Hunt and Lorre went on to create the Discovery Channel World Championships in 2001 after Eco-Challenge left the network for the USA Network. The event later changed its name to the Adventure Racing World Championships and was taken over by an Australian event production company Geocentric Pty Ltd in 2011.

In 1996, Fusil left the Raid to begin a new adventure race series, the Elf Authentic Adventure. Patrick Brignoli and Alain Gaimard continued to organize the Raid with their company RGO and Saga d'Aventures (The 1998 Raid in Ecuador was the first raid organized without Fusil). 2003 was the last year for the Raid Gauloises. In 2004, the Raid Gauloises was retooled into the Raid World Championship.

Entrepreneur Mark Burnett competed in the Raid in 1993 and secured a license from Fusil to run the race in the United States under the name Eco-Challenge, first held in Utah in 1995.

New Zealand adventure racer John Howard entered and won four Raid Gauloises, including 1989, 1991, 1994, and 1998. Howard also won three Eco-Challenges, the ESPN X-Games, and Southern Traverse, one of only two people to do so. The other is Australian athlete Ian Adamson.

== Raid World Cup ==
The format since 2004 is that of a series of events called The Raid World Cup culminating in a world championship event called The Raid World Championship. This final championship event is supposed to be similar to the original events and were held in the following locations:

- 2004 - Argentina
- 2005 - France / Italy / Switzerland (Annecy / Mont Blanc / Gstaad)
- 2006 - Canada
- 2007 - Not held

== Original Raid Gauloises events ==
- 1989 – New Zealand
- 1990 – Costa Rica
- 1991 – New Caledonia
- 1992 – Oman
- 1993 – Madagascar
- 1994 – Malaysia
- 1995 – Argentina
- 1996 – not held
- 1997 – South Africa
- 1998 – Ecuador
- 1999 – not held
- 2000 – Tibet/Nepal
- 2001 – not held
- 2002 – Vietnam
- 2003 – Kyrgyzstan
