= Primal Quest =

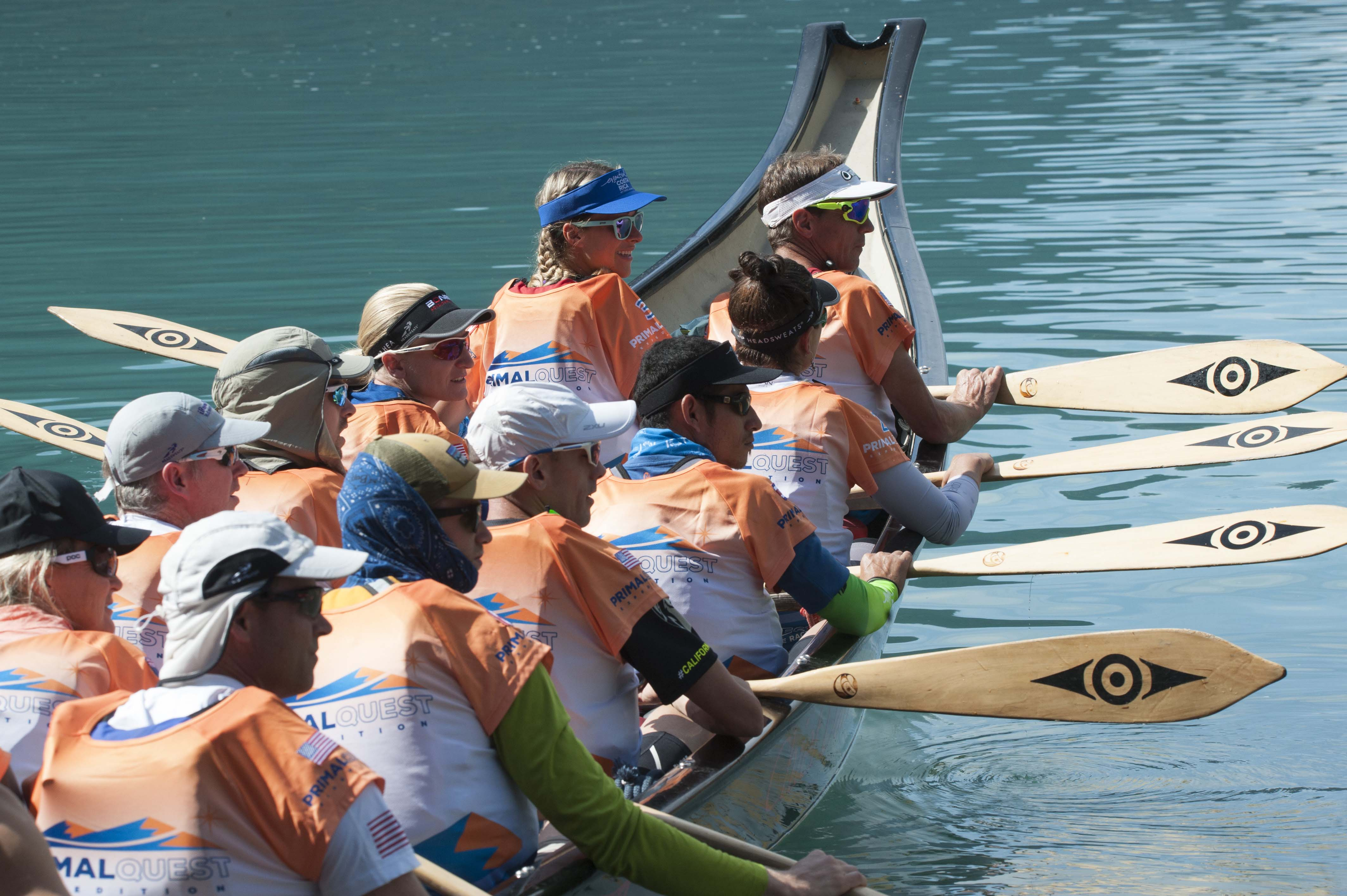
Tribal Canoe Start - Primal Quest 2018

Primal Quest is an expedition adventure race that has been called one of the most difficult athletic events in the world and was cited as the most prestigious expedition event in North America. Co-ed teams of four trail run, mountain bike, kayak, climb, rappel and mountaineer all while navigating all under their own power. The race has been in existence since 2001 and has been successfully revived following the loss of adventure racer Nigel Aylott. Each race lasts up to ten days, with winning teams completing the course in approximately six to eight days. The race once featured the largest prize purse in adventure racing.

Each team is required to carry a GPS monitoring device (without offering navigational assistance) which allows race organizers and spectators to track each team in real-time via the Internet on the Primal Quest website primalquest.org.

== Race history ==
The first Primal Quest was held in 2002 in Telluride, Colorado. In 2003, the race moved to Lake Tahoe and 2004 featured a course on Orcas Island, in the State of Washington. CBS broadcast highlights of the race in 2003 and 2004 with a full feature episodic series on OLN. Primal Quest was the first expedition adventure race to be featured on major network television.

In June 2006 Primal Quest was hosted in the Utah desert . Disciplines included mountain biking, trekking, horseback riding, technical rope skills, mountaineering, kayaking and white water swimming. Primal Quest Utah was broadcast internationally as four one-hour episodes on ESPN2 and a one-hour recap and finale on ABC Sports. Subsequent races took place in 2008, Montana and 2009, South Dakota, 2015 in South Lake Tahoe, with episodes on Outside Television. 2018 crossed borders into Canada, and the feature documentary will be broadcast imminently.

== Previous races ==
=== 2002 Telluride ===
1. SoBe/SmartWool (Nike ACG/Balance Bar in 2003)
2. Team Montrail
3. Team GoLite (Nike ACG/Balance Bar in 2003)

=== 2003 Lake Tahoe ===
1. Nike ACG/Balance Bar (was SoBe/Smartwool and GoLite)
2. AROC
3. Team Seagate

=== 2004 Orcas Island ===
1. (tie) Seagate; Nike ACG/Balance Bar
2. Tie for 1st, no 2nd place
3. Holofiber

=== 2006 Moab Utah ===
1. Nike PowerBlast (was Nike ACG/Balance Bar)
2. GoLite/Timberland
3. Merrell/Wigwam Adventure

=== 2008 Montana ===
1. Nike (was Nike PowerBlast)
2. Merrell/Zanfel Adventure
3. Bones

=== 2009 Badlands South Dakota ===
1. OrionHealth.com
2. Salomon/Crested Butte
3. Merrell/Zanfel Adventure

=== 2015 Lake Tahoe California ===
1. GODZone
2. Bones
3. Journey

=== 2018 Squamish British Columbia ===
1. Columbia Vidaraid GODZone
2. Bones
3. Quest Racing
