= Adventure racing =

Multi-disciplinary team sport

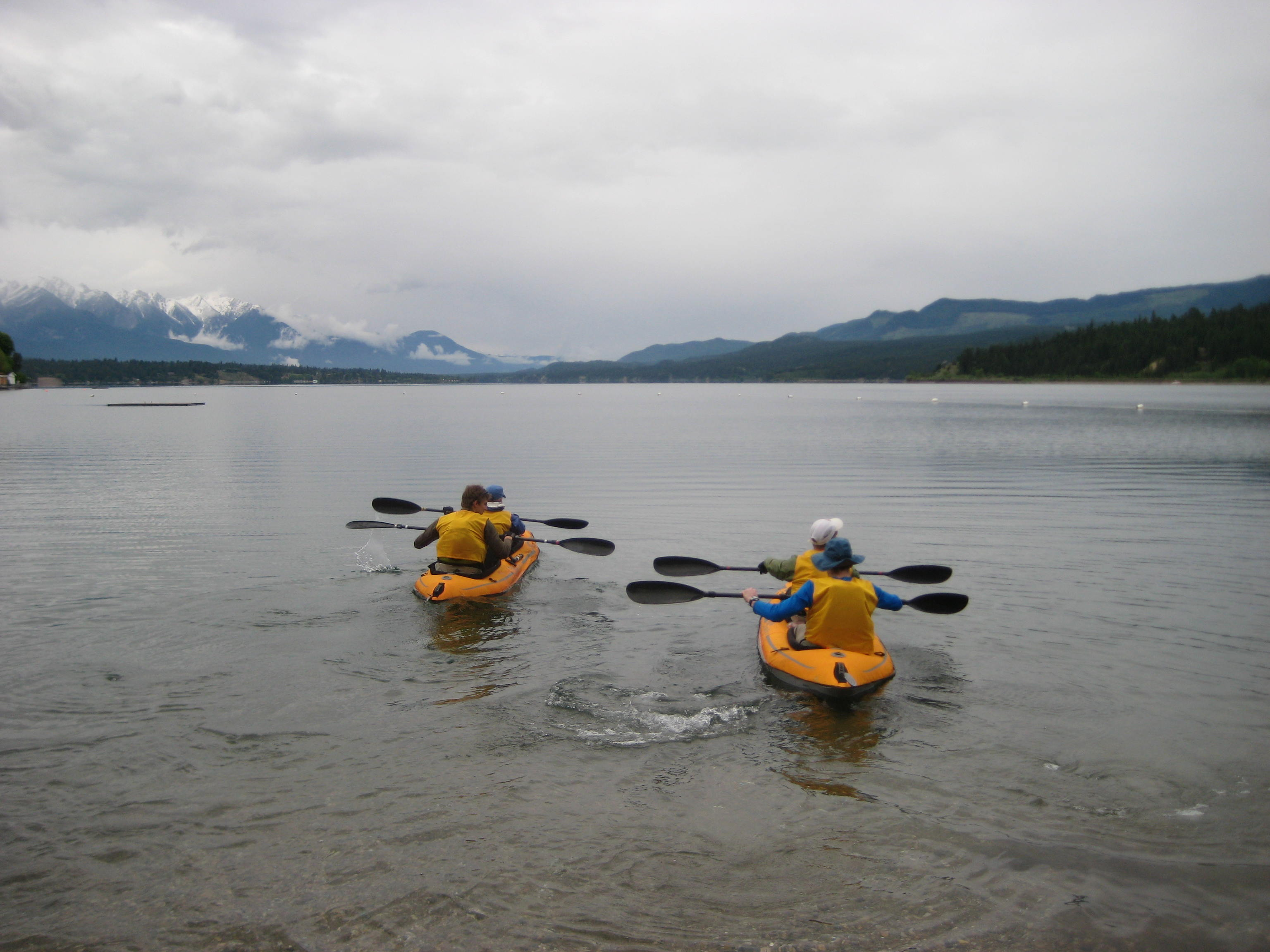
Team Wild Rose setting out on the paddling section at Full Moon in June 2009, Panorama Mountain Village

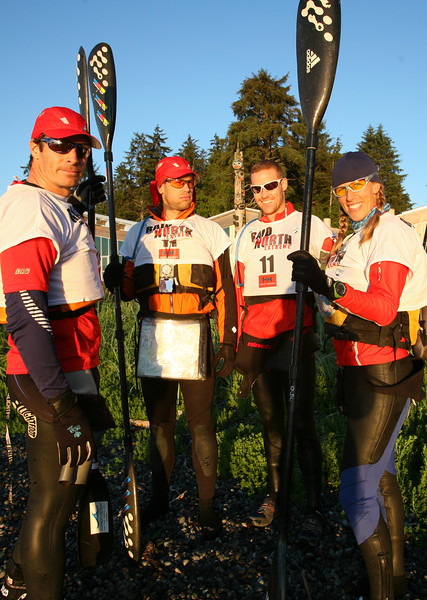
Team Intrepid Travel at the start line of Raid the North Extreme Prince Rupert & Haida Gwaii, BC, 2007

Adventure racing (also called expedition racing) is typically a multidisciplinary team sport involving navigation over an unmarked wilderness course with races extending anywhere from two hours up to two weeks in length. Some races offer solo competitions as well. The principal disciplines in adventure racing include trekking, mountain biking, and paddling although races can incorporate a multitude of other disciplines including climbing, abseiling, horse riding, skiing and white water rafting. Teams generally vary in gender and in size from two to five competitors, however, the main format is considered to be mixed-gender teams of four racers. There is typically no suspension of the clock during races, irrespective of length; elapsed competition time runs concurrently with real-time, and competitors must choose if or when to rest.

== Origin ==
The roots of adventure racing are deep and the origin of the modern adventure race is debatable. Some point to the two-day Karrimor International Mountain Marathon, first held in 1968 as the birth of modern adventure racing. The Karrimor Marathon required two-person teams to traverse mountainous terrain while carrying all the supplies required to support themselves through the double-length marathon run.

In 1980, the Alpine Ironman was held in New Zealand. Individual competitors ran, paddled, and skied toward a distant finish line. Later that year, the Alpine Ironman's creator, Robin Judkins launched the better-known Coast to Coast race. This involved most of the elements of modern adventure racing: trail running, cycling and paddling. Australia's two-day WildTrek ran from 1981 through 2005.

Independently in 1982, the first expedition-length adventure race, a week-long, North American event called the Alaska Mountain Wilderness Classic debuted. It involved wilderness travel—no roads, no pack animals, and no support team to carry food and equipment from start to finish—with less than 50 of its 150-mile length on a trail. It continues today, changing courses every three years.

== Modern adventure racing ==
In 1989, the modern era of adventure racing arrived with Gerald Fusil's launch of the Raid Gauloises in New Zealand. Inspired by the Paris-Dakar Rally, Fusil envisioned an expanded expedition-style race in which competitors would rely on their own strength and abilities to traverse great and challenging terrain. The race included all the modern elements of adventure racing, including mixed-gender teams competing in a multi-day 400+ mile race. Building on Fusil's concept, the inaugural Southern Traverse was held in 1991.

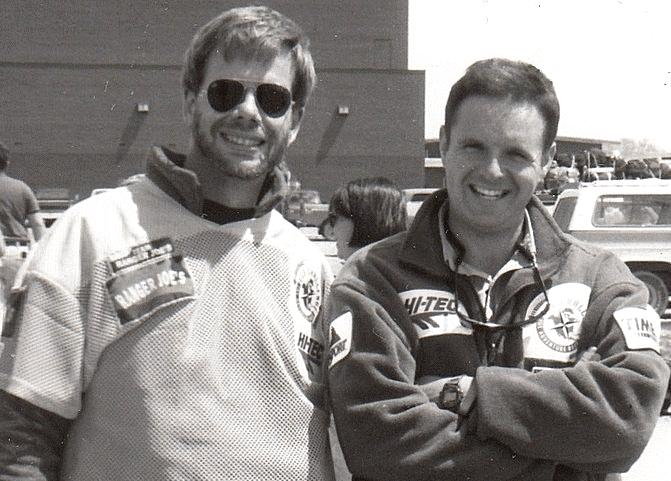
Mark Burnett (right) during the Eco-Challenge.

In the early 1990s, Mark Burnett read a Los Angeles Times article about Raid Gauloises and was inspired to compete and bring the race to the USA and promote the race as a major televised sporting event. After purchasing the rights from Gerald Fusil, Burnett launched the first "Eco-Challenge" race in 1995. Burnett promoted his event with Emmy-award-winning films (tapping the talent of Mike Sears to produce the films for the first two events). This incarnation of Eco-Challenge was last held in 2002 when Burnett shifted his focus to Survivor, the Contender, the Apprentice and other reality-based television shows. With the Eco-Challenge also came the name "adventure race", a phrase coined by journalist and author Martin Dugard, to describe the class of races embodied by the Raid and Eco-Challenge.

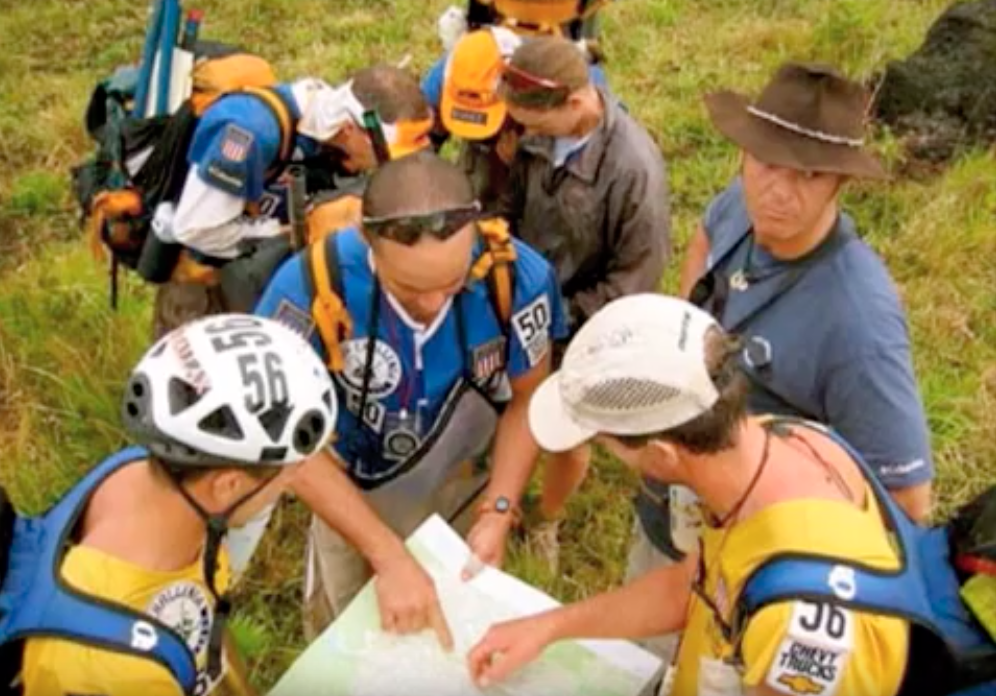
Ian Adamson and Mark Burnett at Eco-Challenge Fiji 2002

The United States Adventure Racing Association "USARA" was formed in 1998. The USARA was the first "national governing body" for the sport of adventure racing and arose from the need for safety standards, insurance and to promote the growth of adventure racing in the United States. USARA has added national rankings, a national championship, and ecological standards to the list of benefits provided for the sport of adventure racing.

In 2000, the inaugural United States Adventure Racing Association Adventure Race National Championship was held in Kernville, California. The USARA National Championship is typically held the first weekend in October and is considered the premier adventure race in the U.S. The USARA Adventure Racing National Championship has continued each year drawing the best US teams for a chance at earning the title of national champion. The National Points Series Champion is also awarded at the National Championship.

In 2001, the inaugural World Championships were held in Switzerland with Team Nokia Adventure crossing the finishing line first. The concept of a world championship lay dormant until it was revived in 2004, with Canada's Raid the North Extreme serving as the AR World Championship event in Newfoundland and Labrador. The Adventure Racing World Series and its ultimate event, the AR World Championships have been held every year since. The 2013 World Championships were in Costa Rica, 2014 in Ecuador, 2015 in Brazil, 2016 in Australia, 2017 in the United States, and 2018 off the coast of Africa on the Reunion Island.

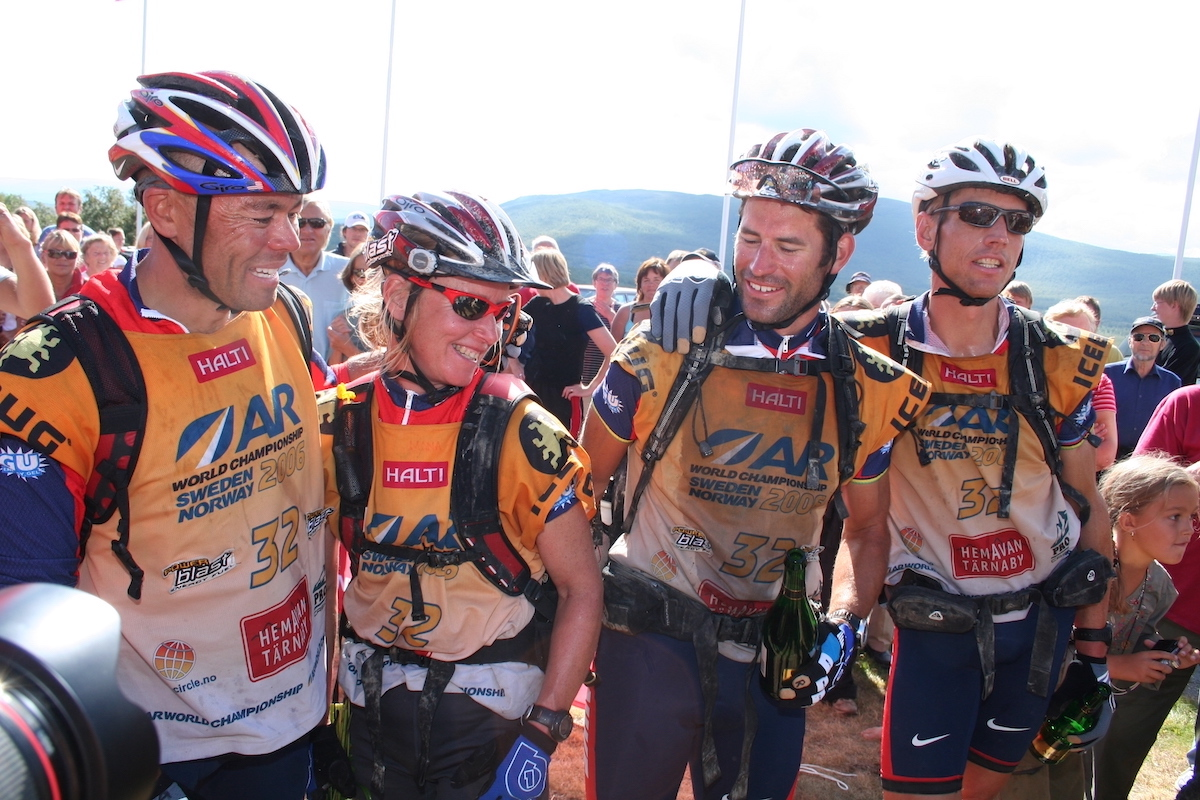
2006 Adventure Race World Champions Ian Adamson, Monique Merrill, Richard Ussher, Dave Wiens

In 2004, professional geologist Stjepan Pavicic organized the first Patagonian Expedition Race at the bottom tip of the American continent, in the Chilean Tierra del Fuego. Truly demanding routes through rough terrain of often more than 600 km soon made it be known as "the last wild race".

In 2010, the German Adventure Race Series was held for the first time in three different locations all over Germany. Since then the popularity of the sport in Germany has grown every year. More races and venues have joined the series and the number of competitors are still growing from year to year. Competitors can start in teams of two (male, female or mixed) within the categories Master (15–20 h), Challenger (8–10 h) or Beginner (4–6 h).

In 2010 in Australia, Adventure Junkie company was launched. It formed a grassroots movement to help promote and expand the sport of Adventure Racing in Australia. They have started a series of short sprint races and longer expedition-style events up to 48-hour events.

In 2012, Commander Forer of the Royal Navy organized the first Sea-land navigation discipline race the Solent Amphibious Challenge. The race demanded the competitors split up between sailing, running, and cycling in parts of the race and rendezvous at the end, and sail the yacht to the finish line.

In December 2017, the Adventure Racing Cooperative (ARC) was launched in the United States. It was formed in a grassroots movement to help promote and expand the sport of Adventure Racing in the United States. ARC is a 501(c)(3) not-for-profit business.

In June 2018 Eco-Challenge announced it would re-launch in 2019 with Bear Grylls and the original production team

In December 2018 launched Warrior Adventure Racing in the US and has become one the largest event groups in the World with adventure races like the famous "Sea to Sea Expedition Race" across Florida, Expedition Alaska and Expedition Colorado.

== Race types ==
=== Lengths ===
- 12-hour: a six- to twelve-hour race, featuring limited navigation and orienteering.
- 24-hour: a race lasting between 18-30+ hours, typically involving UTM-based (Universal Transverse Mercator) navigation. Often basic rope work is involved (e.g., traverses or rappels). 24-hour and longer races used to require that competitors employ a support crew to transport gear from place to place. Most races these days do not permit support crews, with race organizers transporting gear bins to designated checkpoints for racers.
- Expedition: Three- to 11-day race (or longer), involving all the challenges of a multi-day race, but often with additional disciplines (e.g., horseback riding, unusual paddling events, extensive mountaineering and rope work).
- Multi-day: a 36–48+ hour race, involving advanced navigation and route choice; sleep deprivation becomes a significant factor.
- Sprint: typically a two- to six-hour race, featuring minimal navigation and occasionally involving games or special tests of agility or cunning.
- Staged multi-day: Multiple 2-5 days of varying length, but every night the race time is stopped and competitors can recover and sleep.

=== Disciplines ===
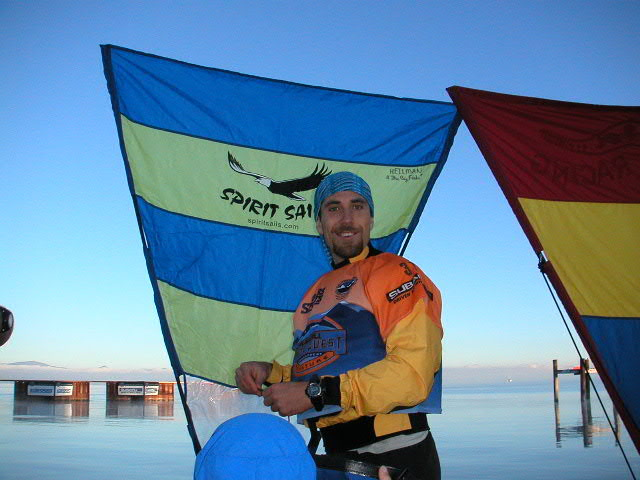
Setting up a kayak sail just before the start of Primal Quest 2003

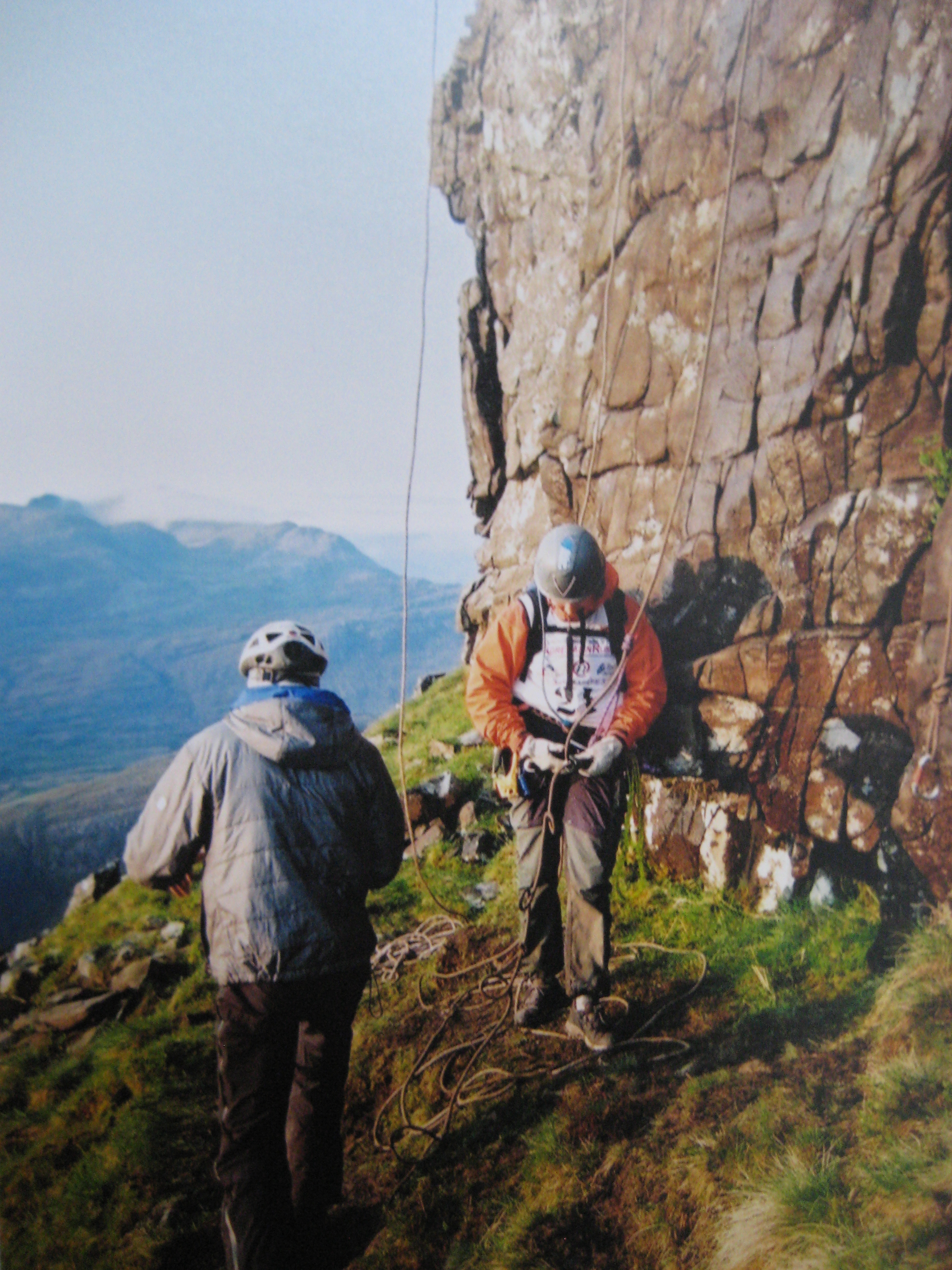
Preparing for the climbing section at an adventure race (Adrenaline Rush) in Scotland

The majority of adventure races include trail running, mountain biking, and a paddling event. Navigation and rope work are also featured in all but the shortest races. Races often feature:

- Beasts of burden: Horses and camels;
- Catching air: paragliding, hang-gliding;
- Covering terrain: orienteering, mountaineering, coasteering, caving, swimming, canyoneering, riverboarding;
- Learning the ropes: ascending; rappelling, traversing (including via zip-line).
- Paddling: kayaks, canoes, out-riggers, rafts and tubing;
- Traveling on wheels: mountain bikes, kick-scooters, in-line skates, roller skates;

== See also ==
- Fastpacking
- Mountain bike orienteering
- Orienteering
- Rogaining
