= Mount Williams =

Mount Williams may refer to:

== Mountain summit ==
- Mount Williams (Alaska), United States
- Mount Williams (British Columbia), a mountain in the Bendor Range of the Pacific Ranges of the Coast Mountains, British Columbia, Canada
- Mount Williams (Canada), a mountain on the Continental Divide and British Columbia-Alberta border in the Canadian Rockies
- Mount Williams (Massachusetts), United States, a subordinate peak of Mount Greylock, of Massachusetts
- Mount Williams (New Zealand), a mountain in Arthur's Pass National Park
- Mount Williams, New Zealand, source of the Mathias River
- Mount Williamson, Inyo County, California, United States

== Town ==
- Mount Williams, Virginia, a town in Virginia

== Other ==
- Mount Williams (Oklahoma), a demolished hill in Norman, Oklahoma

== See also ==
- Williams Mountain (disambiguation)
- Williams Peak (disambiguation)
