= Scott Mountain =

Scott Mountain may refer to:

- Scott Mountain (Douglas County, Oregon)
- Scott Mountain (Lane County, Oregon)

== See also ==
- Mount Scott (disambiguation)
- Scott Mountains (disambiguation)
- Scotts Mountain
