= Mount Williams (New Zealand) =

Mountain in the Canterbury Region of New Zealand

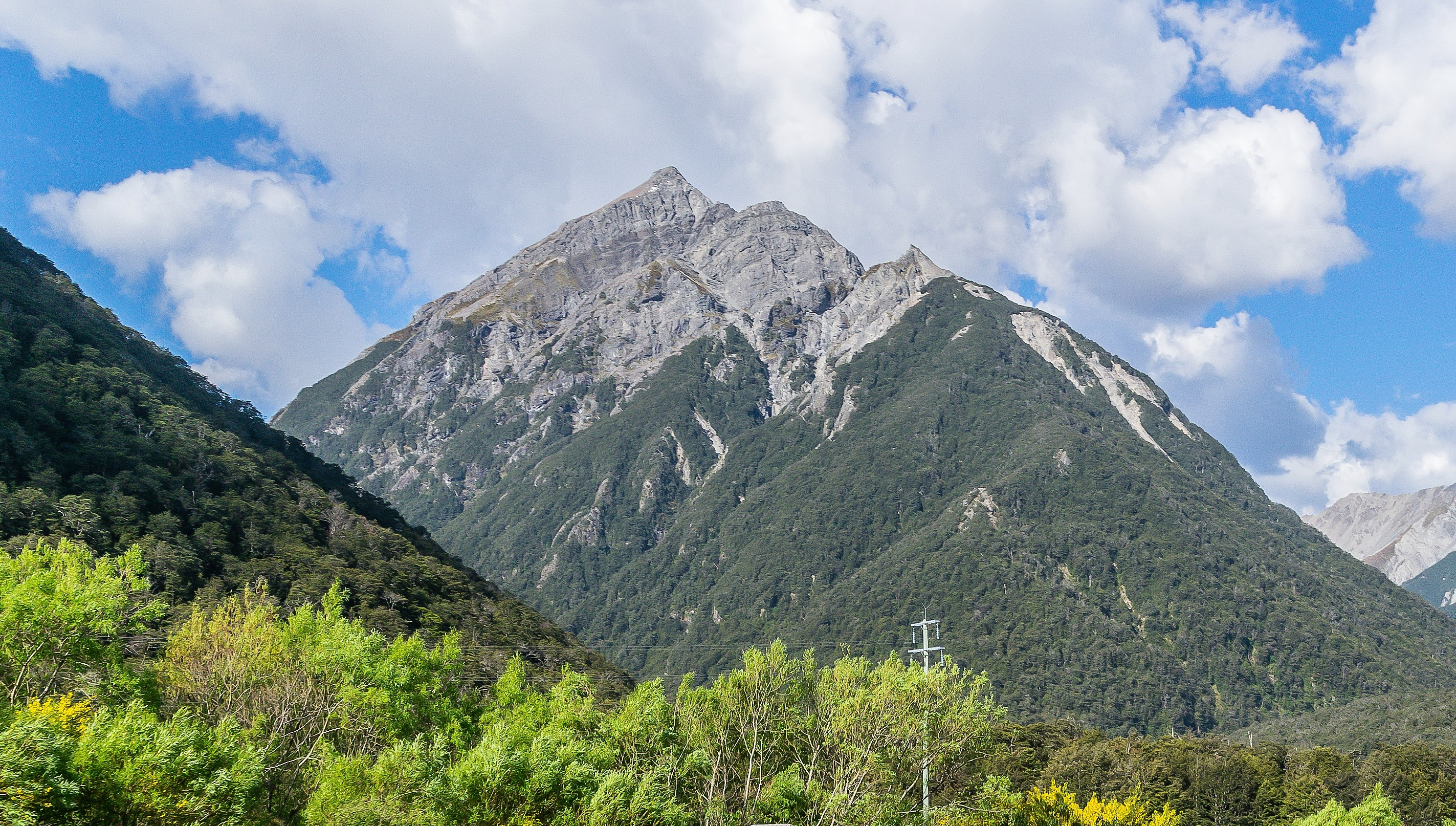
- Southwest aspect

Highest point
- Elevation: 1,718 m (5,636 ft)
- Prominence: 391 m (1,283 ft)
- Isolation: 3.54 km (2.20 mi)
- Coordinates: 42.96111°S 171.62706°E

Geography
- Location within New Zealand
- Interactive map of Mount Williams
- Location: South Island
- Country: New Zealand
- Region: Canterbury
- Protected area: Arthur's Pass National Park
- Parent range: Southern Alps
- Topo map: Topo50 BY15 498 416

Geology
- Rock age: Triassic
- Rock type: Rakaia Terrane

Climbing
- First ascent: 1930

Mount Williams is a 1,718-metre-elevation (5,636-foot) mountain in the Canterbury Region of New Zealand.

== Description ==
Mount Williams is located 111 kilometres (69 mi) northwest of Christchurch and 5.5 kilometres (3.4 mi) east-southeast of Arthur's Pass in Arthur's Pass National Park. It is set in the Southern Alps of the South Island. Precipitation runoff from the mountain's west slope drains into the Mingha River, whereas the east slope drains into the Edwards River. Like many peaks of the Southern Alps, Mount Williams is more notable for its large, steep rise above local terrain than for its absolute elevation. Topographic relief is significant as the summit rises 918 metres (3,012 feet) above the Edwards Valley in one kilometre, and 1,000 metres (3,281 feet) above the Mingha Valley in 1.5 kilometres. The nearest higher peak is Dome, 3.5 kilometres to the southeast.

== Climate ==
Based on the Köppen climate classification, Mount Williams is located in a marine west coast (Cfb) climate zone. Prevailing westerly winds blow moist air from the Tasman Sea onto the mountains, where the air is forced upwards by the mountains (orographic lift), causing moisture to drop in the form of rain or snow. The months of December through February offer the most favourable weather for viewing or climbing this peak.

Climate data for Arthurs Pass Village (1991–2020 normals, extremes 1978–present)
Month	Jan	Feb	Mar	Apr	May	Jun	Jul	Aug	Sep	Oct	Nov	Dec	Year
Record high °C (°F)	32.1 (89.8)	29.5 (85.1)	26.4 (79.5)	22.5 (72.5)	17.6 (63.7)	14.0 (57.2)	12.8 (55.0)	14.3 (57.7)	20.0 (68.0)	22.5 (72.5)	26.2 (79.2)	27.6 (81.7)	32.1 (89.8)
Mean maximum °C (°F)	25.6 (78.1)	25.4 (77.7)	22.4 (72.3)	17.8 (64.0)	14.4 (57.9)	11.1 (52.0)	9.9 (49.8)	12.0 (53.6)	14.9 (58.8)	18.0 (64.4)	20.7 (69.3)	23.4 (74.1)	27.2 (81.0)
Mean daily maximum °C (°F)	18.3 (64.9)	18.6 (65.5)	16.1 (61.0)	12.7 (54.9)	9.7 (49.5)	6.7 (44.1)	6.0 (42.8)	7.6 (45.7)	9.8 (49.6)	11.7 (53.1)	13.9 (57.0)	16.5 (61.7)	12.3 (54.2)
Daily mean °C (°F)	13.3 (55.9)	13.4 (56.1)	11.2 (52.2)	8.3 (46.9)	5.8 (42.4)	3.0 (37.4)	2.2 (36.0)	3.5 (38.3)	5.5 (41.9)	7.3 (45.1)	9.3 (48.7)	11.8 (53.2)	7.9 (46.2)
Mean daily minimum °C (°F)	8.3 (46.9)	8.2 (46.8)	6.3 (43.3)	4.0 (39.2)	1.9 (35.4)	−0.6 (30.9)	−1.6 (29.1)	−0.7 (30.7)	1.3 (34.3)	3.0 (37.4)	4.7 (40.5)	7.2 (45.0)	3.5 (38.3)
Mean minimum °C (°F)	2.5 (36.5)	2.3 (36.1)	−0.4 (31.3)	−2.2 (28.0)	−3.9 (25.0)	−6.7 (19.9)	−7.5 (18.5)	−6.2 (20.8)	−4.5 (23.9)	−2.7 (27.1)	−1.4 (29.5)	1.3 (34.3)	−8.3 (17.1)
Record low °C (°F)	−1.0 (30.2)	−1.5 (29.3)	−8.5 (16.7)	−7.8 (18.0)	−7.5 (18.5)	−11.5 (11.3)	−12.5 (9.5)	−11.0 (12.2)	−8.2 (17.2)	−6.1 (21.0)	−5.0 (23.0)	−1.4 (29.5)	−12.5 (9.5)
Average rainfall mm (inches)	413.5 (16.28)	272.6 (10.73)	321.2 (12.65)	370.3 (14.58)	395.0 (15.55)	378.1 (14.89)	328.4 (12.93)	353.0 (13.90)	452.5 (17.81)	489.4 (19.27)	438.6 (17.27)	447.7 (17.63)	4,660.3 (183.49)
Average relative humidity (%)	77	78	82	86	88	90	88	87	84	81	78	78	83
Source 1: NIWA
Source 2: "Arthur's Pass – Weather Database"

== Climbing ==
Climbing routes:

- Via Mid Mingha River – First ascent by Evan Wilson – (July 1930)
- South West Ridge
- Gunbarrel Scree
- Via Edwards Hut

== The Spike ==
The Spike is a subsummit on the southwest ridge of Mount Williams, with less than one kilometre between summits. The elevation of The Spike is 1,440 metres and there are climbing routes via Gunbarrel Scree and the Southwest Ridge. This feature's toponym has been officially approved by the New Zealand Geographic Board.

== See also ==
- List of mountains of New Zealand by height
