= Phipps Peak (New Zealand) =

Mountain in New Zealand

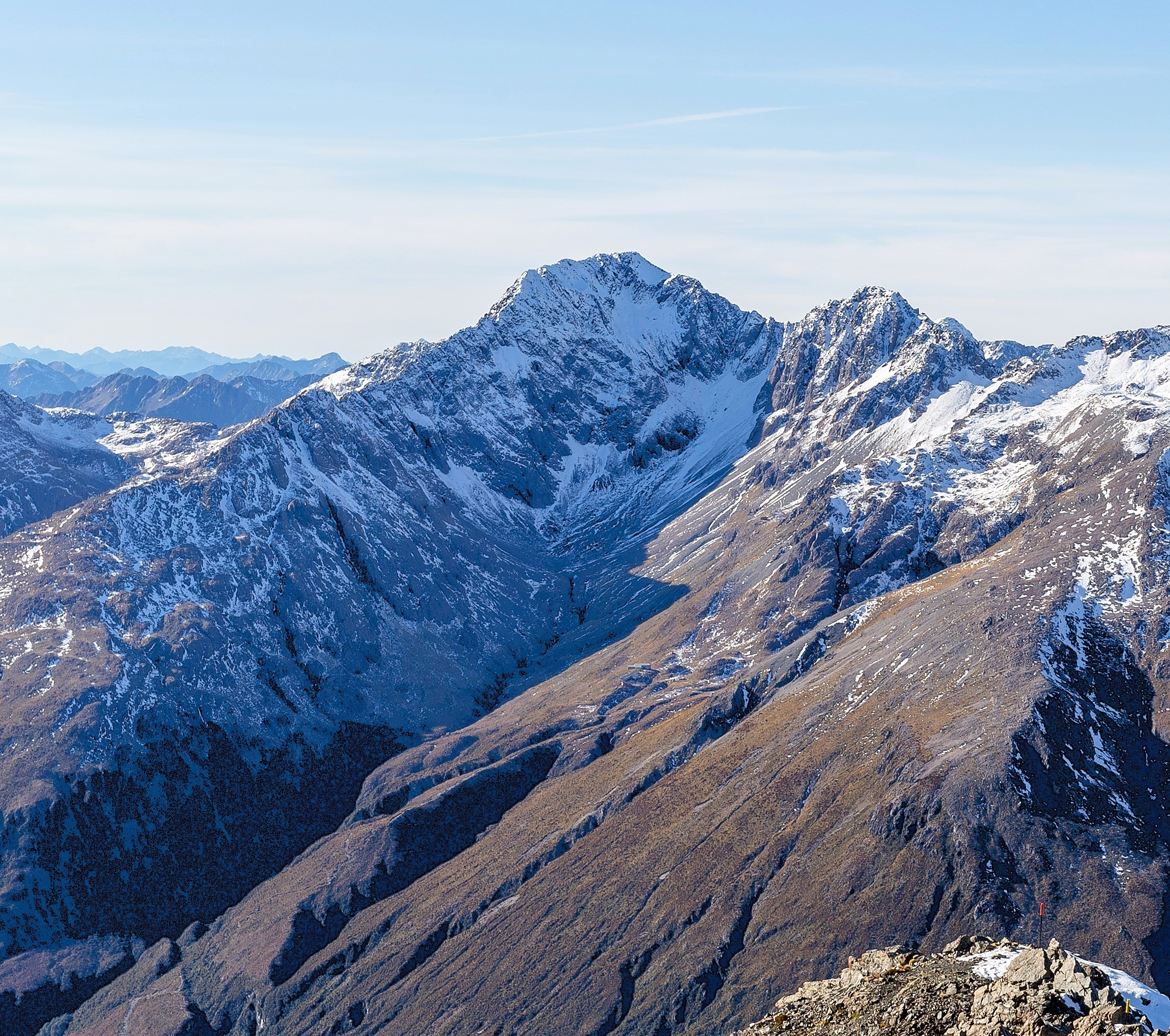
- Southwest aspect

Highest point
- Elevation: 1,965 m (6,447 ft)
- Prominence: 895 m (2,936 ft)
- Isolation: 5.2 km (3.2 mi)
- Coordinates: 42.895743°S 171.59121°E

Naming
- Etymology: George Phipps-Williams

Geography
- Location within New Zealand
- Interactive map of Phipps Peak
- Location: South Island
- Country: New Zealand
- Region: Canterbury / West Coast
- Protected area: Arthur's Pass National Park
- Parent range: Southern Alps
- Topo map(s): NZMS260 K33; Topo50 BV20 850 498

Geology
- Rock age: Triassic
- Rock type: Rakaia Terrane

Climbing
- First ascent: 1896

Phipps Peak is a 1,965-metre-elevation (6,447-foot) mountain in New Zealand.

== Description ==
Phipps Peak is located six kilometres (3.7 mi) north of Arthur's Pass in Arthur's Pass National Park. It is situated on the crest or Main Divide of the Southern Alps, and set on the boundary shared by the Canterbury and West Coast Regions of the South Island. Precipitation runoff from the mountain's east slope drains to the Deception River, whereas the southwest slope drains to the Bealey River, and the northwest slope drains to the Ōtira River. Topographic relief is significant as the northwest slope rises 765 metres (2,510 feet) in one kilometre. The nearest higher peak is Mount Oates, 5.2 kilometres to the east. The mountain is named after George Phipps-Williams (1846–1909), a surveyor or engineer employed on the construction of the New Zealand Midland Railway which crosses Arthur's Pass below this peak.

== Climate ==
Based on the Köppen climate classification, Phipps Peak is located in a marine west coast (Cfb) climate zone. Prevailing westerly winds blow moist air from the Tasman Sea onto the mountains, where the air is forced upwards by the mountains (orographic lift), causing moisture to drop in the form of rain or snow. This climate supports the Temple Basin ski area on the southwest slope of the peak. The months of December through February offer the most favourable weather for viewing or climbing this peak.

Climate data for Arthurs Pass Village (1991–2020 normals, extremes 1978–present)
Month	Jan	Feb	Mar	Apr	May	Jun	Jul	Aug	Sep	Oct	Nov	Dec	Year
Record high °C (°F)	32.1 (89.8)	29.5 (85.1)	26.4 (79.5)	22.5 (72.5)	17.6 (63.7)	14.0 (57.2)	12.8 (55.0)	14.3 (57.7)	20.0 (68.0)	22.5 (72.5)	26.2 (79.2)	27.6 (81.7)	32.1 (89.8)
Mean maximum °C (°F)	25.6 (78.1)	25.4 (77.7)	22.4 (72.3)	17.8 (64.0)	14.4 (57.9)	11.1 (52.0)	9.9 (49.8)	12.0 (53.6)	14.9 (58.8)	18.0 (64.4)	20.7 (69.3)	23.4 (74.1)	27.2 (81.0)
Mean daily maximum °C (°F)	18.3 (64.9)	18.6 (65.5)	16.1 (61.0)	12.7 (54.9)	9.7 (49.5)	6.7 (44.1)	6.0 (42.8)	7.6 (45.7)	9.8 (49.6)	11.7 (53.1)	13.9 (57.0)	16.5 (61.7)	12.3 (54.2)
Daily mean °C (°F)	13.3 (55.9)	13.4 (56.1)	11.2 (52.2)	8.3 (46.9)	5.8 (42.4)	3.0 (37.4)	2.2 (36.0)	3.5 (38.3)	5.5 (41.9)	7.3 (45.1)	9.3 (48.7)	11.8 (53.2)	7.9 (46.2)
Mean daily minimum °C (°F)	8.3 (46.9)	8.2 (46.8)	6.3 (43.3)	4.0 (39.2)	1.9 (35.4)	−0.6 (30.9)	−1.6 (29.1)	−0.7 (30.7)	1.3 (34.3)	3.0 (37.4)	4.7 (40.5)	7.2 (45.0)	3.5 (38.3)
Mean minimum °C (°F)	2.5 (36.5)	2.3 (36.1)	−0.4 (31.3)	−2.2 (28.0)	−3.9 (25.0)	−6.7 (19.9)	−7.5 (18.5)	−6.2 (20.8)	−4.5 (23.9)	−2.7 (27.1)	−1.4 (29.5)	1.3 (34.3)	−8.3 (17.1)
Record low °C (°F)	−1.0 (30.2)	−1.5 (29.3)	−8.5 (16.7)	−7.8 (18.0)	−7.5 (18.5)	−11.5 (11.3)	−12.5 (9.5)	−11.0 (12.2)	−8.2 (17.2)	−6.1 (21.0)	−5.0 (23.0)	−1.4 (29.5)	−12.5 (9.5)
Average rainfall mm (inches)	413.5 (16.28)	272.6 (10.73)	321.2 (12.65)	370.3 (14.58)	395.0 (15.55)	378.1 (14.89)	328.4 (12.93)	353.0 (13.90)	452.5 (17.81)	489.4 (19.27)	438.6 (17.27)	447.7 (17.63)	4,660.3 (183.49)
Average relative humidity (%)	77	78	82	86	88	90	88	87	84	81	78	78	83
Source 1: NIWA
Source 2: "Arthur's Pass – Weather Database"

== Climbing ==
The first ascent of the summit was made in December 1896 by Guy Mannering, Arthur Ollivier, W.D. Wood, and F.H. Polhill.

Climbing routes:

- Via Temple Basin – Mannering, Ollivier, Wood, Polhill – (1896)
- Via Pegleg Creek
- Via Deception River

== Gallery ==
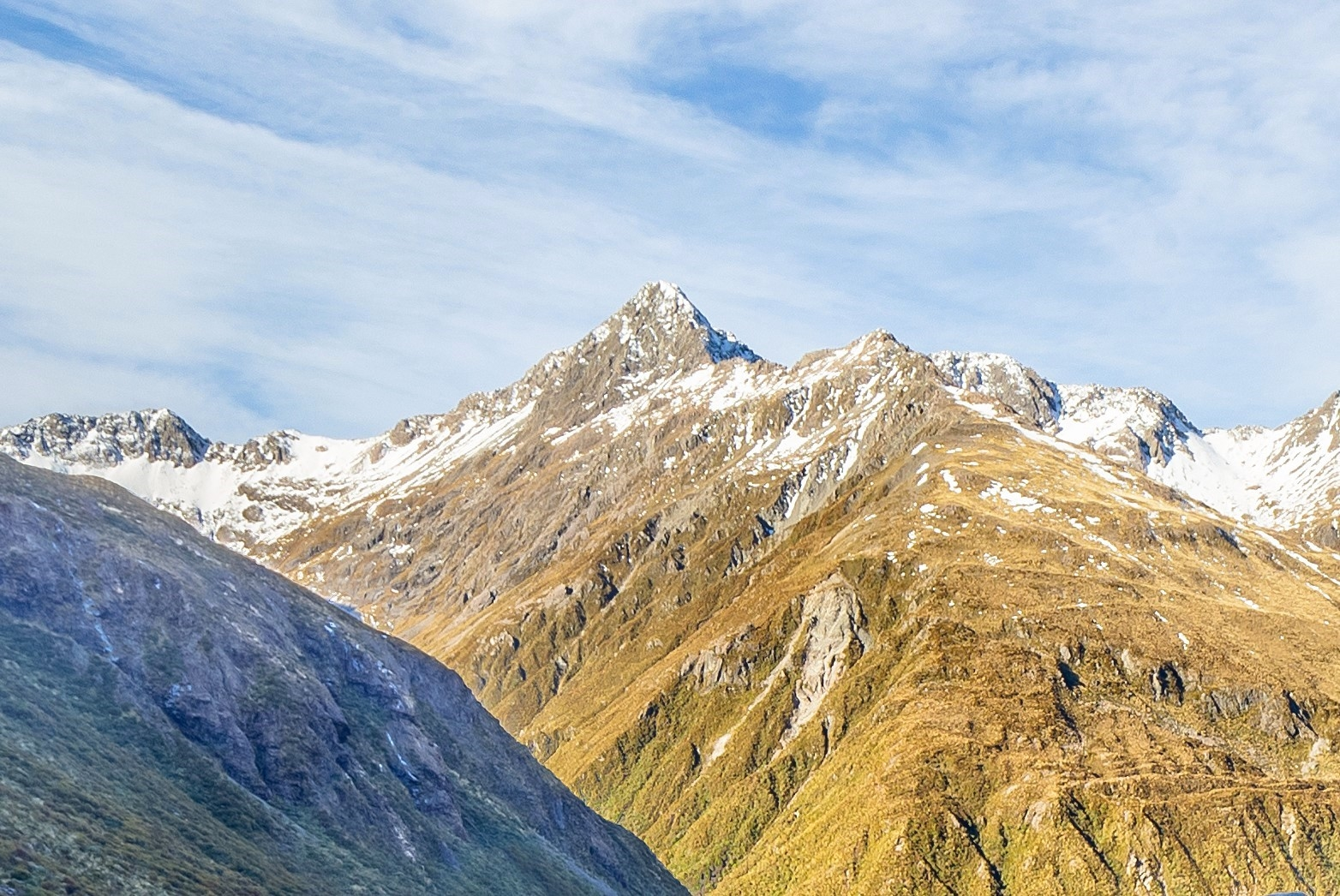
West aspect

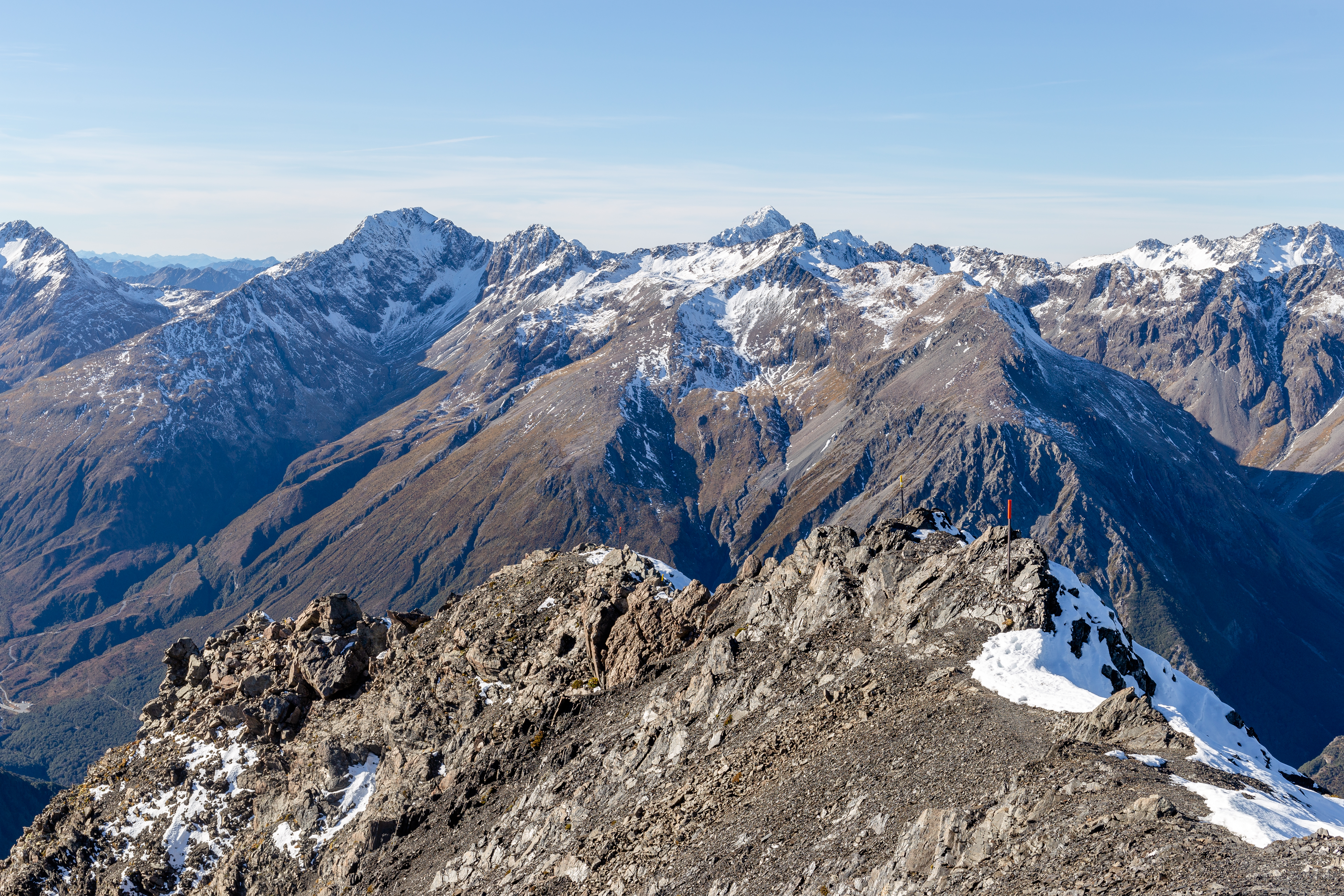
Phipps Peak to the left

== See also ==
- List of mountains of New Zealand by height
