= Blimit =

Mountain in the Canterbury Region of New Zealand

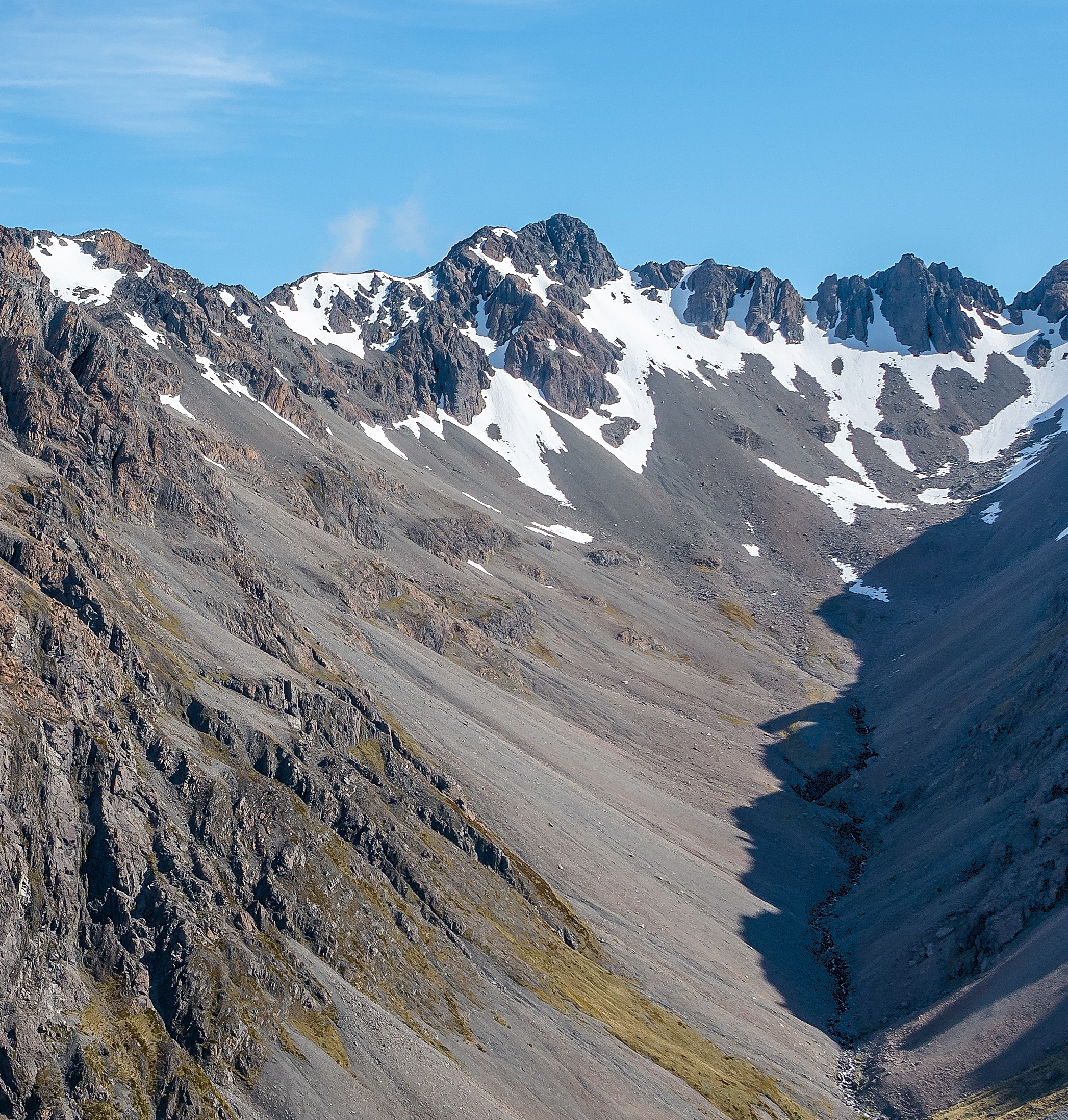
- South aspect

Highest point
- Elevation: 1,921 m (6,302 ft)
- Prominence: 147 m (482 ft)
- Isolation: 1.8 km (1.1 mi)
- Coordinates: 42.911977°S 171.590701°E

Geography
- Location within New Zealand
- Interactive map of Blimit
- Location: South Island
- Country: New Zealand
- Region: Canterbury
- Protected area: Arthur's Pass National Park
- Parent range: Southern Alps

Geology
- Rock age: Triassic
- Rock type: Rakaia Terrane

Blimit is a 1,921-metre-elevation (6,302-foot) mountain in the Canterbury Region of New Zealand.

== Description ==
Blimit is located four kilometres (2.5 mi) north-northeast of Arthur's Pass in Arthur's Pass National Park and is set in the Southern Alps of the South Island. Precipitation runoff from the mountain drains west to the Bealey River and east into the headwaters of the Mingha River. Topographic relief is significant as the summit rises 620 metres (2,034 feet) above the Mingha headwaters in one kilometre. The nearest higher peak is Phipps Peak, 1.8 kilometres to the north. The mountain's toponym has been officially approved by the New Zealand Geographic Board and is a blend word of "bail limit" which is the officially recognised form of the mountaineer's longstanding expletive for abandoning a climb before reaching the top, often due to fatigue or realising the route is beyond capabilities.

== Climate ==
Based on the Köppen climate classification, Blimit is located in a marine west coast (Cfb) climate zone. Prevailing westerly winds blow moist air from the Tasman Sea onto the mountains, where the air is forced upwards by the mountains (orographic lift), causing moisture to drop in the form of rain or snow. This climate supports the Temple Basin ski area on the west slope of the peak. The months of December through February offer the most favourable weather for viewing or climbing this peak.

Climate data for Arthurs Pass Village (1991–2020 normals, extremes 1978–present)
Month	Jan	Feb	Mar	Apr	May	Jun	Jul	Aug	Sep	Oct	Nov	Dec	Year
Record high °C (°F)	32.1 (89.8)	29.5 (85.1)	26.4 (79.5)	22.5 (72.5)	17.6 (63.7)	14.0 (57.2)	12.8 (55.0)	14.3 (57.7)	20.0 (68.0)	22.5 (72.5)	26.2 (79.2)	27.6 (81.7)	32.1 (89.8)
Mean maximum °C (°F)	25.6 (78.1)	25.4 (77.7)	22.4 (72.3)	17.8 (64.0)	14.4 (57.9)	11.1 (52.0)	9.9 (49.8)	12.0 (53.6)	14.9 (58.8)	18.0 (64.4)	20.7 (69.3)	23.4 (74.1)	27.2 (81.0)
Mean daily maximum °C (°F)	18.3 (64.9)	18.6 (65.5)	16.1 (61.0)	12.7 (54.9)	9.7 (49.5)	6.7 (44.1)	6.0 (42.8)	7.6 (45.7)	9.8 (49.6)	11.7 (53.1)	13.9 (57.0)	16.5 (61.7)	12.3 (54.2)
Daily mean °C (°F)	13.3 (55.9)	13.4 (56.1)	11.2 (52.2)	8.3 (46.9)	5.8 (42.4)	3.0 (37.4)	2.2 (36.0)	3.5 (38.3)	5.5 (41.9)	7.3 (45.1)	9.3 (48.7)	11.8 (53.2)	7.9 (46.2)
Mean daily minimum °C (°F)	8.3 (46.9)	8.2 (46.8)	6.3 (43.3)	4.0 (39.2)	1.9 (35.4)	−0.6 (30.9)	−1.6 (29.1)	−0.7 (30.7)	1.3 (34.3)	3.0 (37.4)	4.7 (40.5)	7.2 (45.0)	3.5 (38.3)
Mean minimum °C (°F)	2.5 (36.5)	2.3 (36.1)	−0.4 (31.3)	−2.2 (28.0)	−3.9 (25.0)	−6.7 (19.9)	−7.5 (18.5)	−6.2 (20.8)	−4.5 (23.9)	−2.7 (27.1)	−1.4 (29.5)	1.3 (34.3)	−8.3 (17.1)
Record low °C (°F)	−1.0 (30.2)	−1.5 (29.3)	−8.5 (16.7)	−7.8 (18.0)	−7.5 (18.5)	−11.5 (11.3)	−12.5 (9.5)	−11.0 (12.2)	−8.2 (17.2)	−6.1 (21.0)	−5.0 (23.0)	−1.4 (29.5)	−12.5 (9.5)
Average rainfall mm (inches)	413.5 (16.28)	272.6 (10.73)	321.2 (12.65)	370.3 (14.58)	395.0 (15.55)	378.1 (14.89)	328.4 (12.93)	353.0 (13.90)	452.5 (17.81)	489.4 (19.27)	438.6 (17.27)	447.7 (17.63)	4,660.3 (183.49)
Average relative humidity (%)	77	78	82	86	88	90	88	87	84	81	78	78	83
Source 1: NIWA
Source 2: "Arthur's Pass – Weather Database"

== Climbing ==
Climbing routes:

- Via Temple Basin
- Via Cons Track
- Aicken–Blimit Traverse

== See also ==
- List of mountains of New Zealand by height
