= Dome (Polar Range) =

Mountain in the Canterbury Region of New Zealand

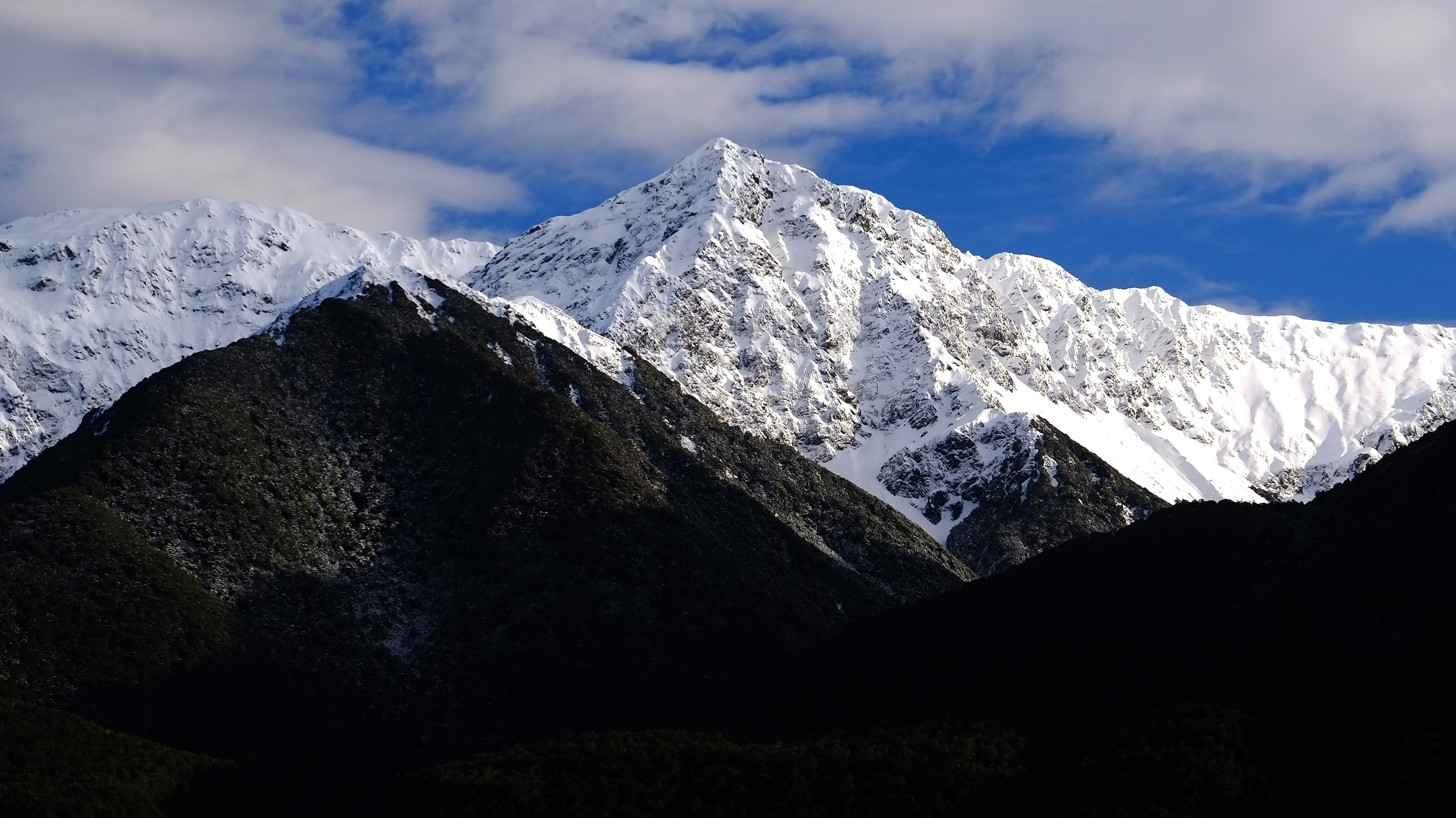
- Southeast aspect

Highest point
- Elevation: 1,945 m (6,381 ft)
- Prominence: 276 m (906 ft)
- Parent peak: Mount Wilson
- Isolation: 5.21 km (3.24 mi)
- Coordinates: 42.97746°S 171.66431°E

Geography
- Location within New Zealand
- Interactive map of Dome
- Location: South Island
- Country: New Zealand
- Region: Canterbury
- Protected area: Arthur's Pass National Park
- Parent range: Southern Alps; Polar Range
- Topo map(s): NZMS260 K33; Topo50 BV20 911 408

Geology
- Rock age: Triassic
- Rock type: Rakaia Terrane

Climbing
- First ascent: 1930

Dome, also known as The Dome, is a 1,945-metre-elevation (6,381-foot) mountain in the Canterbury Region of New Zealand.

== Description ==
Dome is located 108 kilometres (67 mi) northwest of Christchurch in Arthur's Pass National Park in the South Island. It is part of the Polar Range of the Southern Alps. Precipitation runoff from the mountain's slopes drains to the Waimakariri River via Red Beech Stream, Douglas Stream, and Edwards River. Topographic relief is significant as the summit rises 1,345 metres (4,413 feet) above the Waimakariri River Valley in four kilometres, and 1,000 metres (3,281 feet) above Red Beech Stream in 1.5 kilometres. The nearest higher peak is Mount Wilson, 5.2 kilometres to the north.

== Climate ==
Based on the Köppen climate classification, Dome is located in a marine west coast (Cfb) climate zone. Prevailing westerly winds blow moist air from the Tasman Sea onto the mountains, where the air is forced upwards by the mountains (orographic lift), causing moisture to drop in the form of rain or snow. The months of December through February offer the most favourable weather for viewing or climbing this peak.

== Climbing ==
Climbing routes:

- Via Lower Edwards Valley – J. Gill, R.S. Odell – (14 December 1930)
- Via Sudden Valley Biv
- Via Lower Waimakariri River
- Mount Wilson–Mount Scott–The Dome Traverse

== Gallery ==
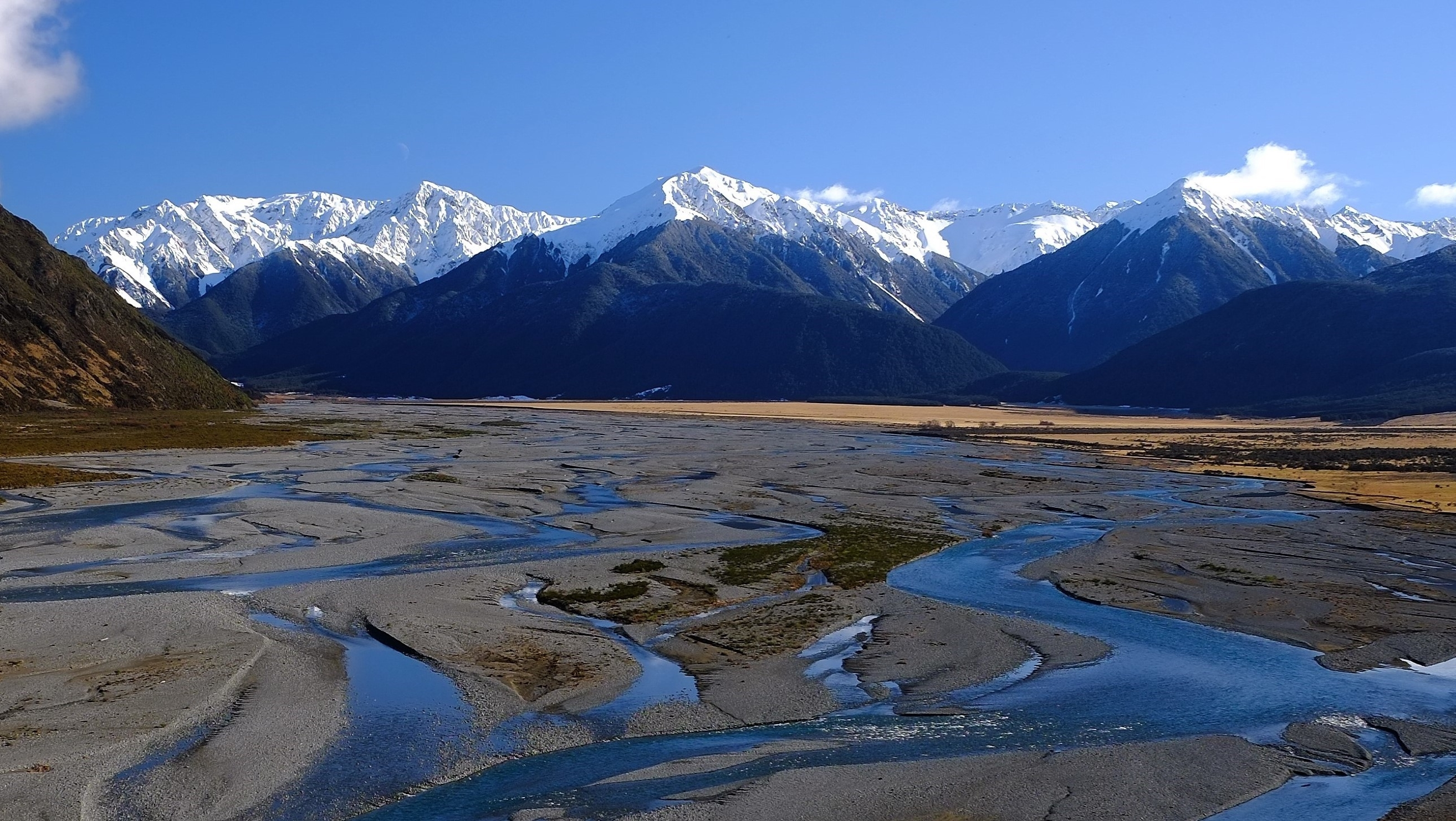
Southeast aspect of Mount Foweraker centred, Dome to left

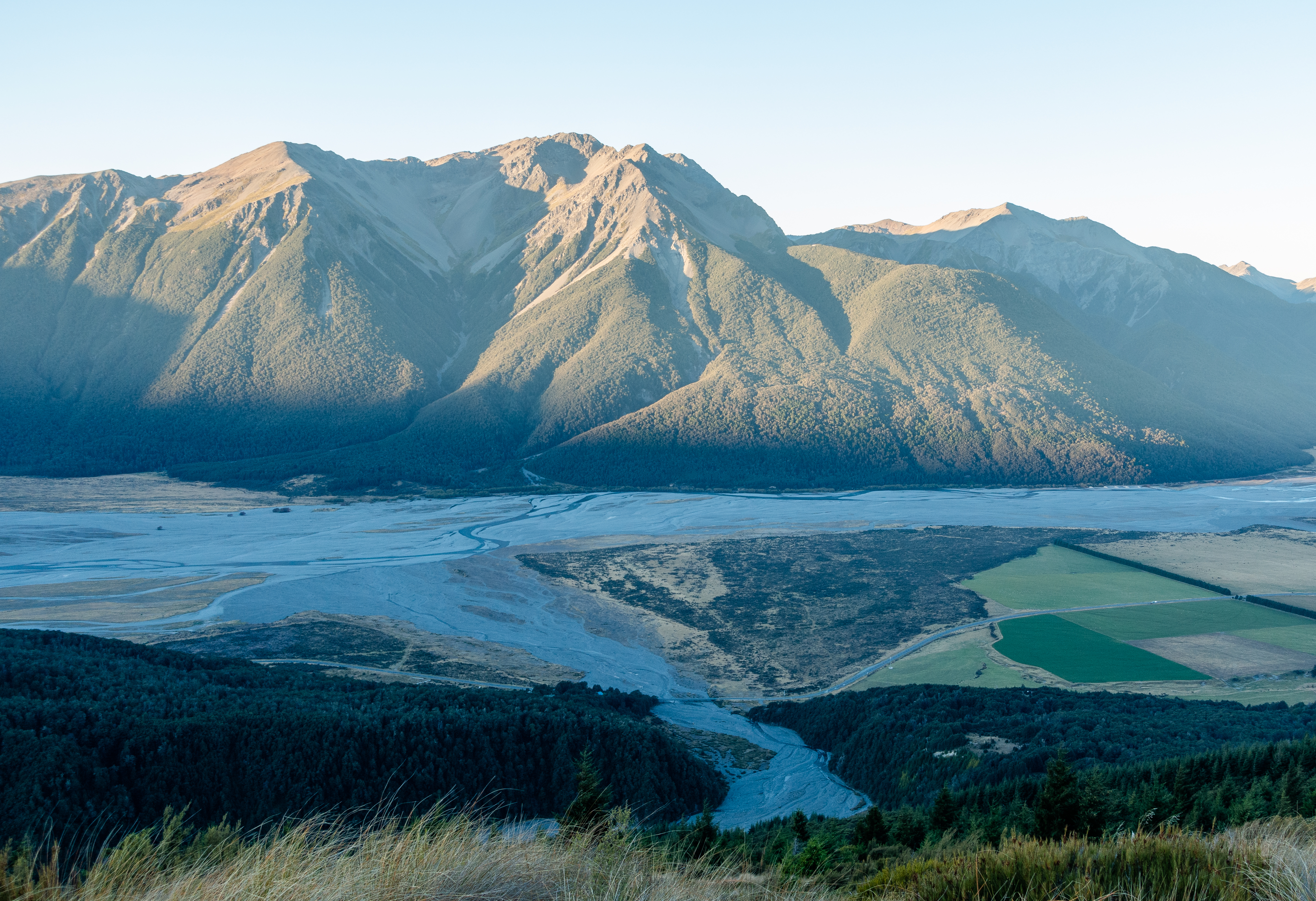
South aspect of Dome centred, with Mount Foweraker to the right

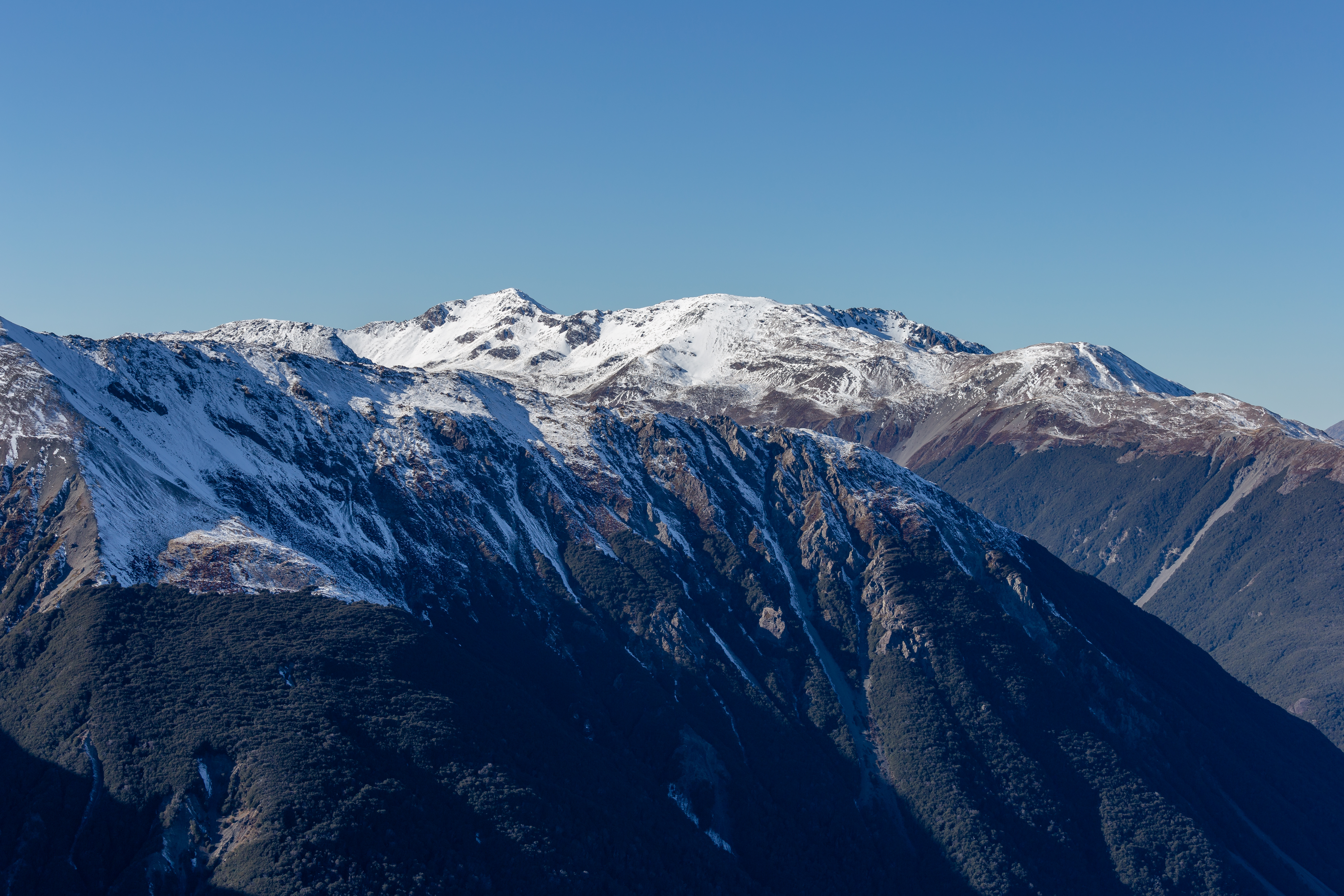
Dome from the west

== See also ==
- List of mountains of New Zealand by height
