= Mount Scott (New Zealand) =

Mountain in the Canterbury Region of New Zealand

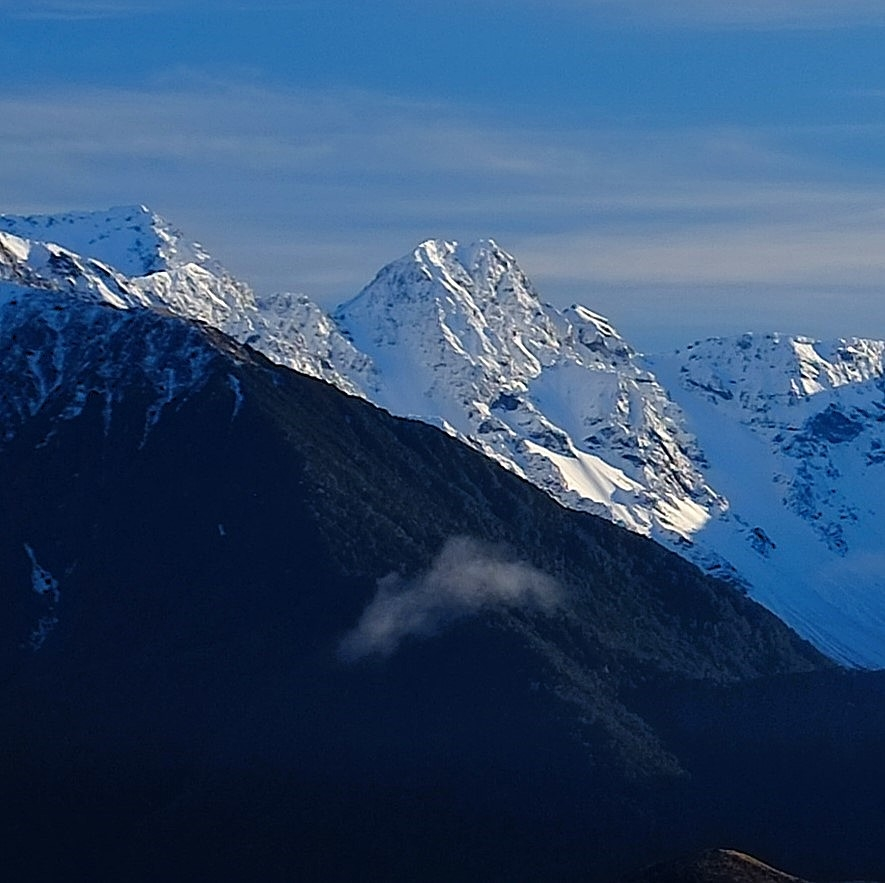
- South aspect

Highest point
- Elevation: 2,009 m (6,591 ft)
- Prominence: 129 m (423 ft)
- Isolation: 0.61 km (0.38 mi)
- Coordinates: 42.927175°S 171.682577°E

Naming
- Etymology: Robert Falcon Scott

Geography
- Location within New Zealand
- Interactive map of Mount Scott
- Location: South Island
- Country: New Zealand
- Region: Canterbury
- Protected area: Arthur's Pass National Park
- Parent range: Southern Alps; Polar Range
- Topo map(s): Topo50 BV21; NZMS260 K33

Geology
- Rock type: Rakaia Terrane

Climbing
- First ascent: December 1930

Mount Scott is a 2,009-metre-elevation (6,591-foot) mountain in the Canterbury Region of New Zealand.

== Description ==
Mount Scott is located 112 kilometres (70 mi) northwest of Christchurch in Arthur's Pass National Park. It is set in the Polar Range of the Southern Alps in the South Island. Precipitation runoff from the mountain's west slope drains into the Edwards River, whereas the east slope drains to the Hawdon River via Sudden Valley Stream. Topographic relief is significant as the summit rises 850 metres (2,789 feet) above the Edwards Valley in 1.5 kilometres. The nearest higher peak is Mount Wilson, 0.6 kilometre to the southwest. The mountain's toponym was applied by Canterbury Mountaineering Club members to honour Robert Falcon Scott (1868–1912), a British Royal Navy officer and explorer who led two expeditions to the Antarctic regions: the Discovery Expedition of 1901–04 and the ill-fated Terra Nova Expedition of 1910–13.

== Climbing ==
The first ascent of the summit was made in December 1930 by J. Gill, J. Wilson, and E. Brough via Upper Edwards Valley.

Climbing routes:

- Via Upper Edwards Valley
- Via Amber Col
- Via Hawdon Hut
- Via Mount Wilson
- Via Sudden Valley Stream

== Climate ==
Based on the Köppen climate classification, Mount Scott is located in a marine west coast (Cfb) climate zone, with a subpolar oceanic climate (Cfc) at the summit. Prevailing westerly winds blow moist air from the Tasman Sea onto the mountains, where the air is forced upwards by the mountains (orographic lift), causing moisture to drop in the form of rain or snow. The months of December through February offer the most favourable weather for viewing or climbing this peak.

== Gallery ==
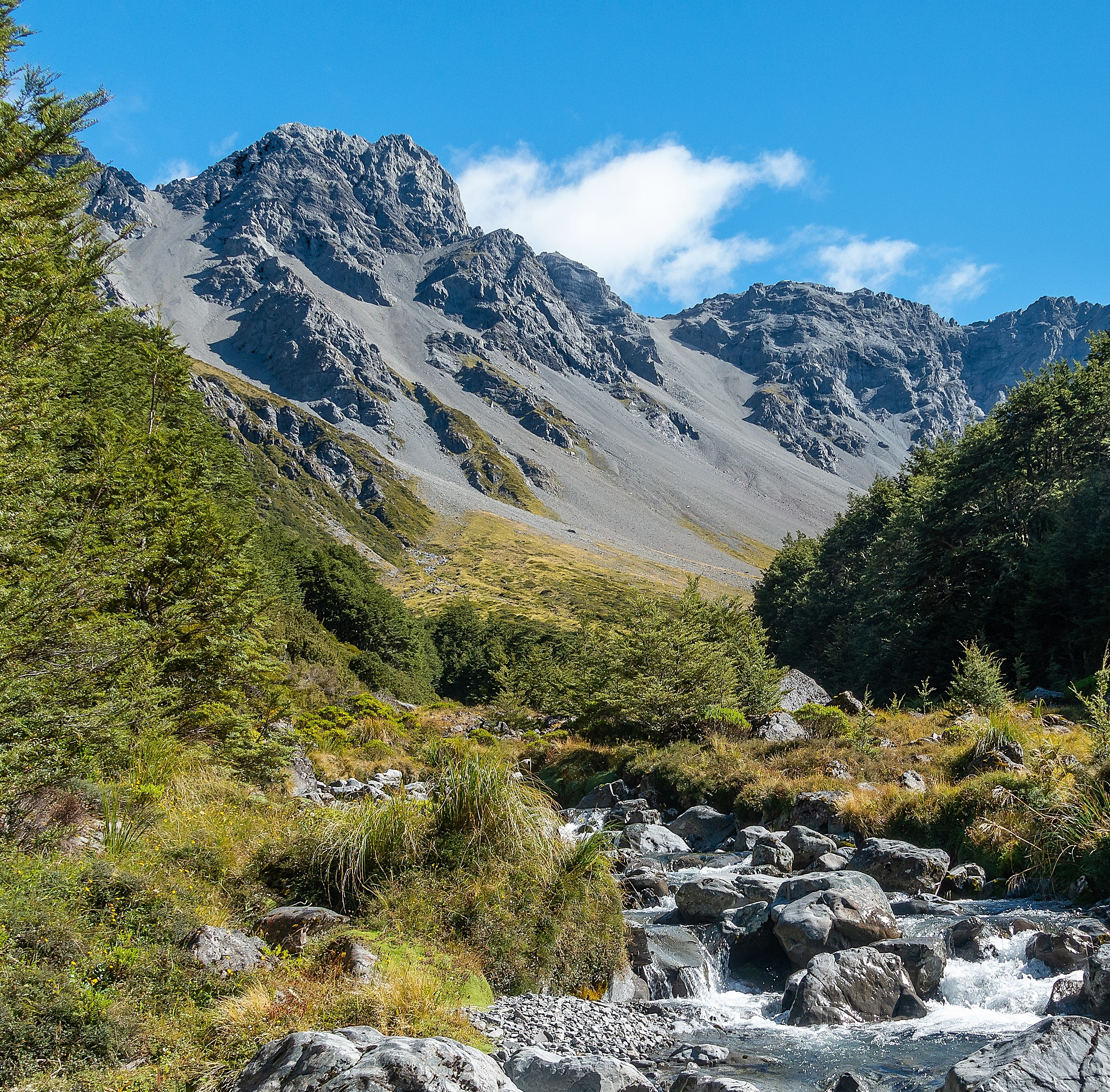
Mount Scott and Sudden Valley Stream

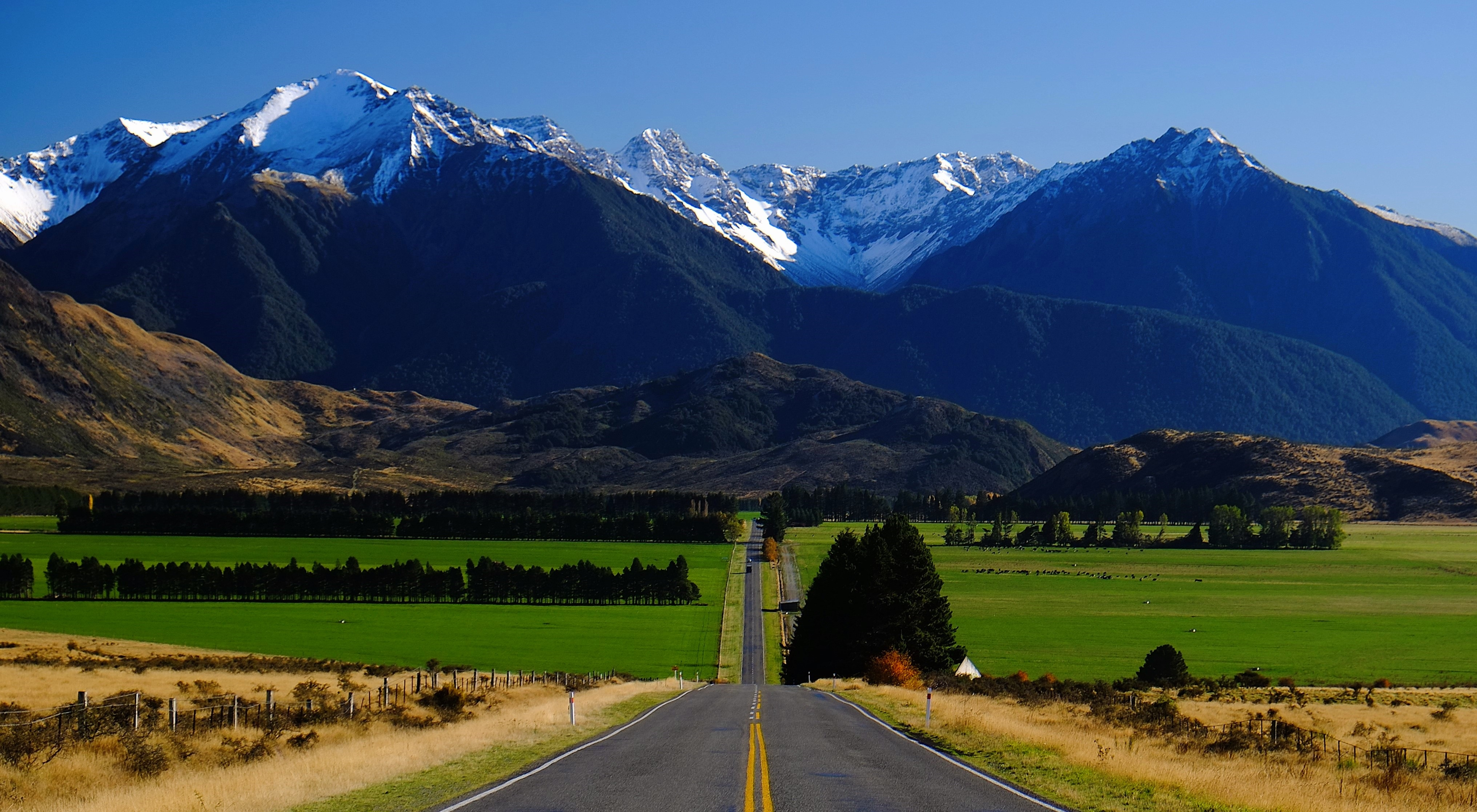
Polar Range with Mount Scott left of centre

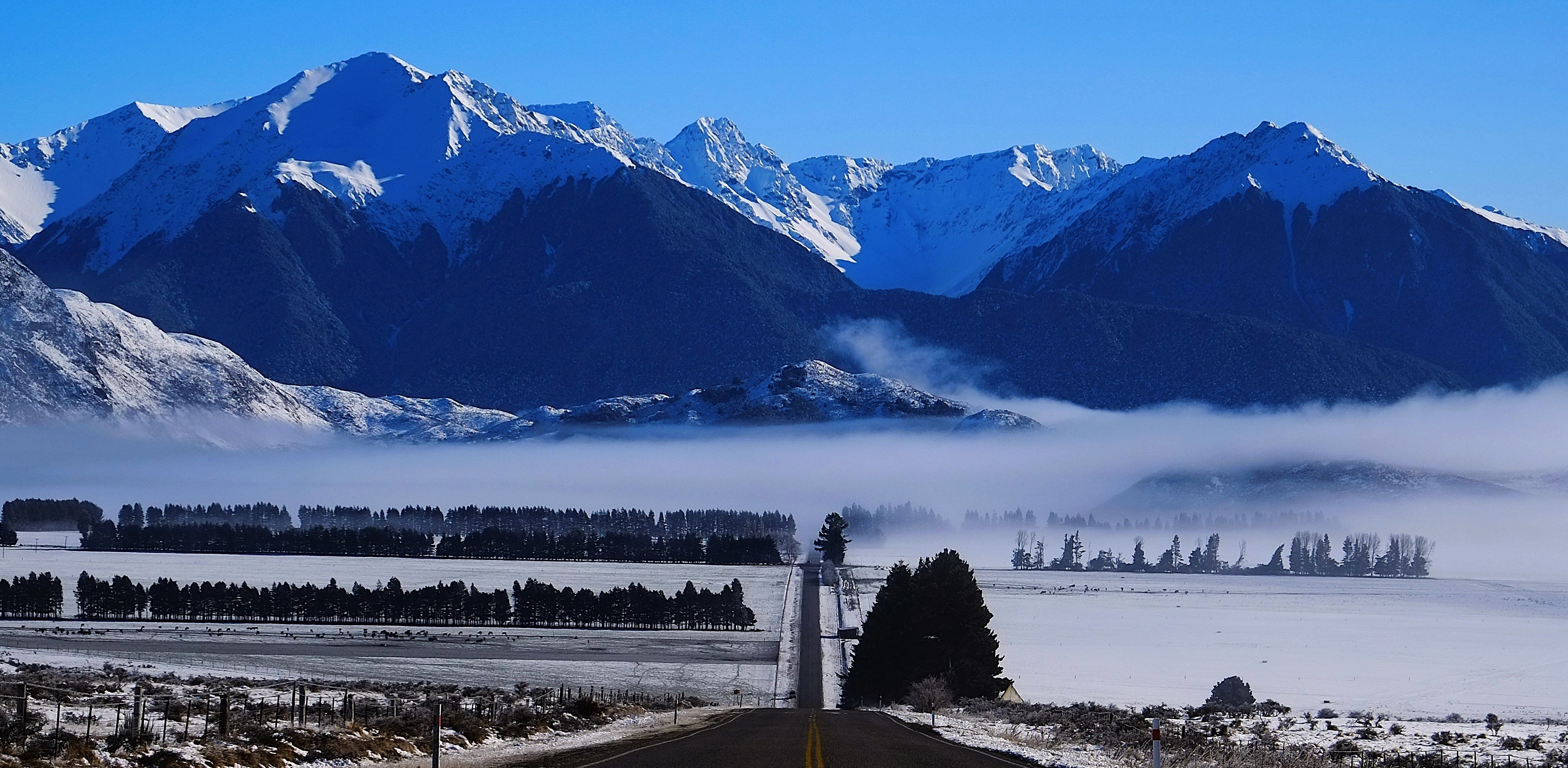
Polar Range in winter with Mount Scott left of centre

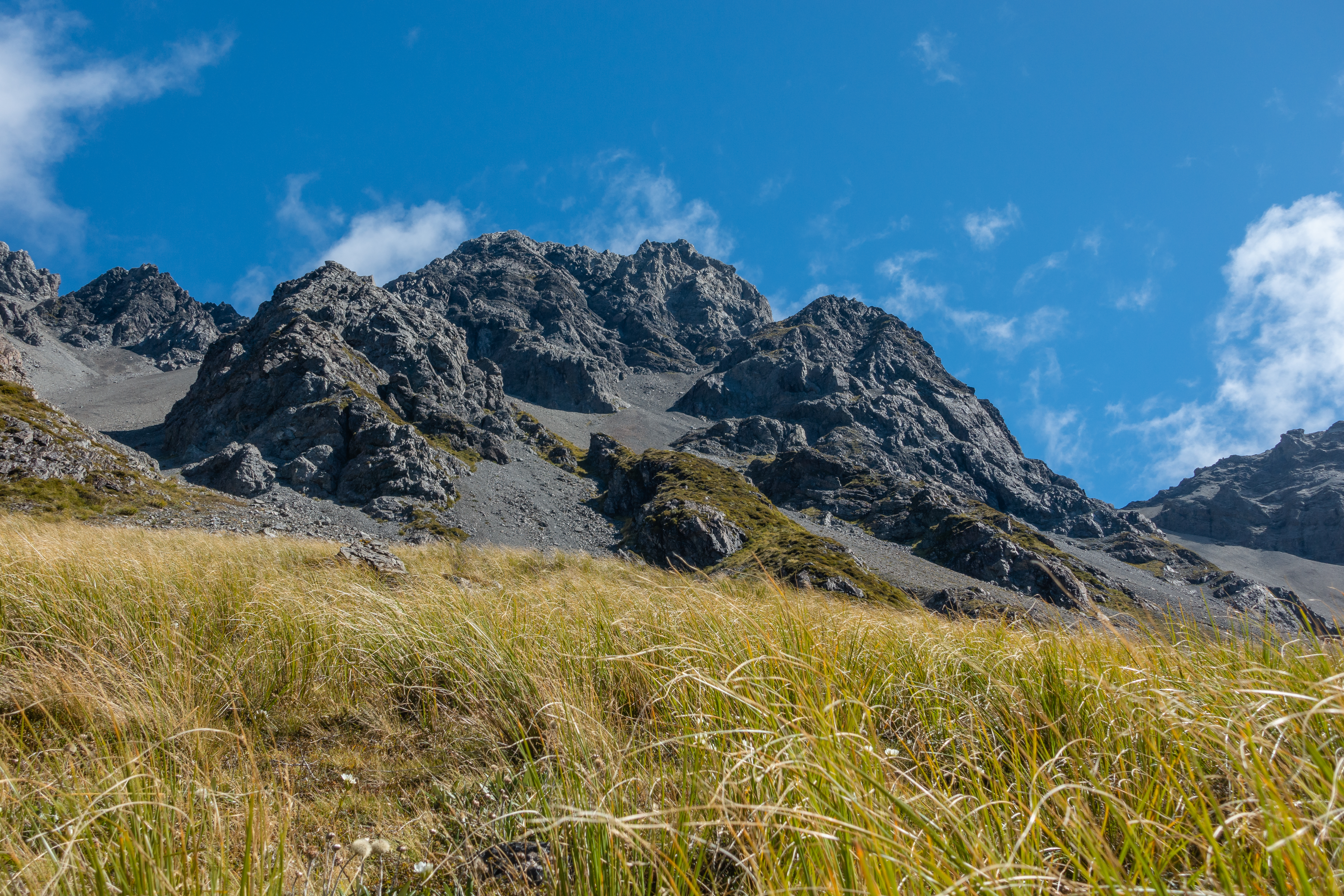
Mount Scott

== See also ==
- List of mountains of New Zealand by height
