= Williams Mountain =

Williams Mountain may refer to:

== Mountain summits ==
- Bill Williams Mountain, Arizona, United States
- Bill Williams Peak, Colorado, United States
- Williams Mountain (Montana), a mountain in Meagher County, Montana

== Mountain ranges ==
- Bill Williams Mountains, near the Aubrey Hills in Arizona, United States
- Williams Mountains, Colorado, United States

== Town ==
- Williams Mountain, West Virginia, United States

== See also ==
- Mount Williams (disambiguation)
- Williams Peak (disambiguation)
