= Scott Mountains =

Scott Mountains may refer to:

- Scott Mountains (Antarctica)
- Scott Mountains (California)

== See also ==
- Scott Mountain
- Scotts Mountain
