= Mount Oates (New Zealand) =

Mountain in the Canterbury Region of New Zealand

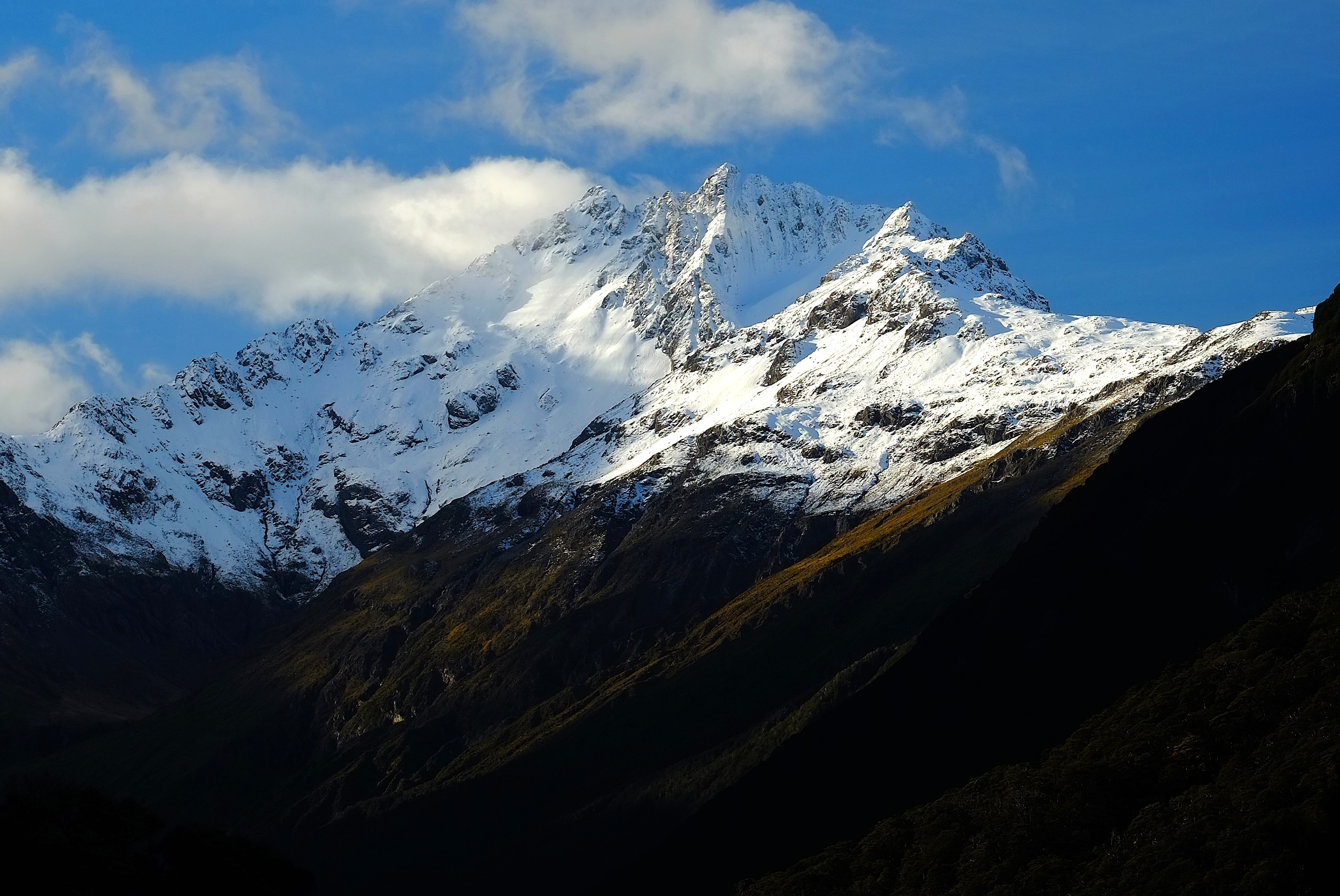
- South aspect

Highest point
- Elevation: 2,054 m (6,739 ft)
- Prominence: 313 m (1,027 ft)
- Isolation: 4 km (2.5 mi)
- Coordinates: 42.907626°S 171.652794°E

Naming
- Etymology: Lawrence Oates

Geography
- Location within New Zealand
- Interactive map of Mount Oates
- Location: South Island
- Country: New Zealand
- Region: Canterbury
- Protected area: Arthur's Pass National Park
- Parent range: Southern Alps
- Topo map(s): Topo50 BV20; NZMS260 K33

Geology
- Rock age: Triassic
- Rock type: Rakaia Terrane

Climbing
- First ascent: 1931

Mount Oates is a 2,054-metre-elevation (6,739-foot) mountain in the Canterbury Region of New Zealand.

== Description ==
Mount Oates is located 115 kilometres (71 mi) northwest of Christchurch in Arthur's Pass National Park. It is set along the Main Divide of the Southern Alps in the South Island. Precipitation runoff from the mountain's west slope drains into the Mingha River, whereas the east slope drains into the Edwards River. Topographic relief is significant as the summit rises 854 metres (2,802 feet) above the Edwards Valley in 1.5 kilometres, and 1,050 metres (3,445 feet) above the Mingha Valley in two kilometres. The nearest higher peak is Mount Franklin, four kilometres to the north. The mountain's toponym honours Lawrence Oates (1880–1912), a British army officer, and later an Antarctic explorer, who died from hypothermia during the ill-fated 1910–13 Terra Nova Expedition to Antarctica.

== Climbing ==
Climbing routes:

- Via Mid Mingha River – B.H. Blunden, John Pascoe, B.A. Barrer – (15 February 1931)
- West Ridge
- West Face
- Via Lake Mavis
- Edwards Direct
- Via Edwards Hut

== Climate ==
Based on the Köppen climate classification, Mount Oates is located in a marine west coast (Cfb) climate zone, with a subpolar oceanic climate (Cfc) at the summit. Prevailing westerly winds blow moist air from the Tasman Sea onto the mountains, where the air is forced upwards by the mountains (orographic lift), causing moisture to drop in the form of rain or snow. The months of December through February offer the most favourable weather for viewing or climbing this peak.

== See also ==
- List of mountains of New Zealand by height

== Gallery ==
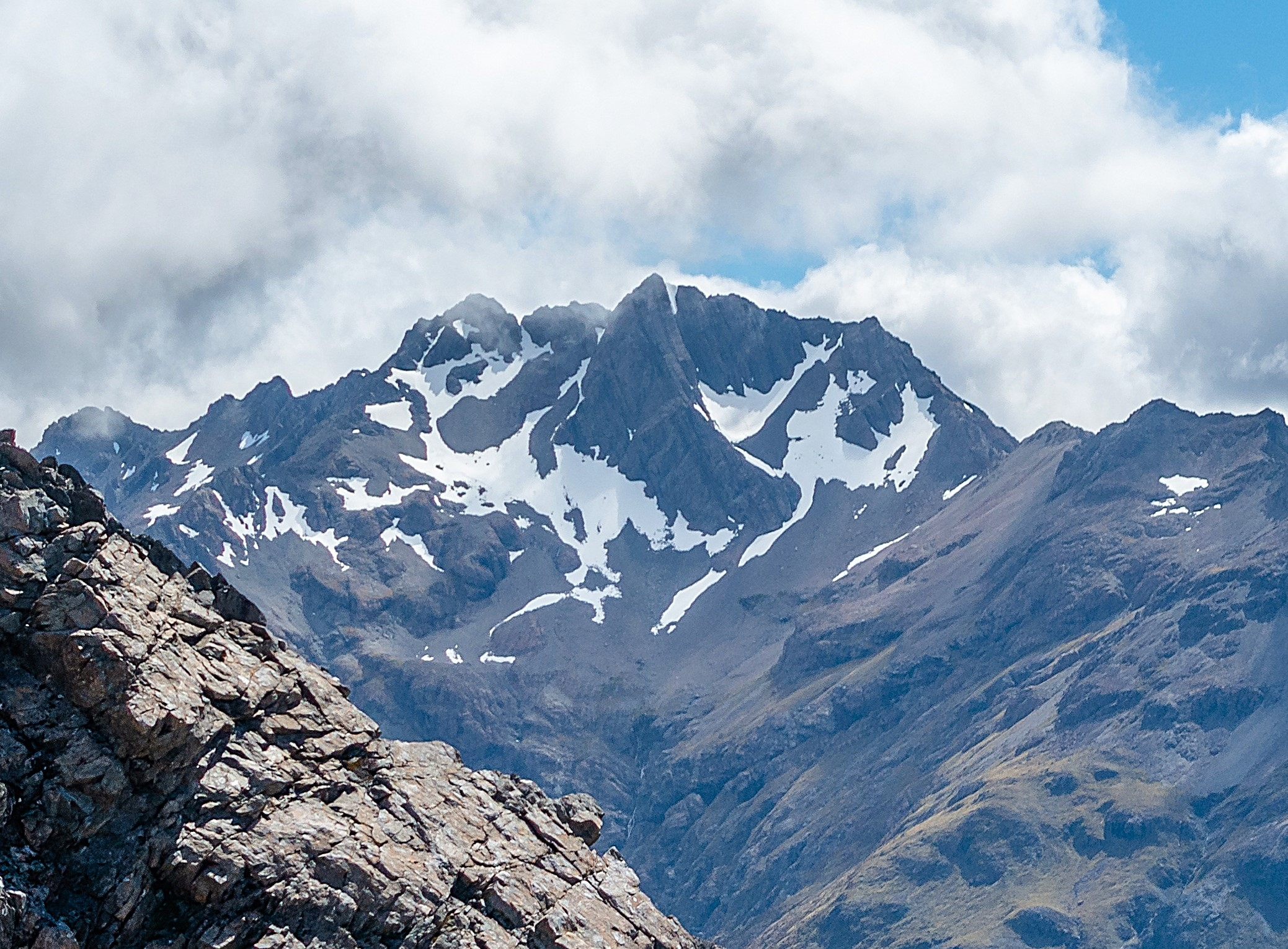
Mount Oates from Mount O'Malley
