= Mount Wilson (New Zealand) =

Mountain in the Canterbury Region of New Zealand

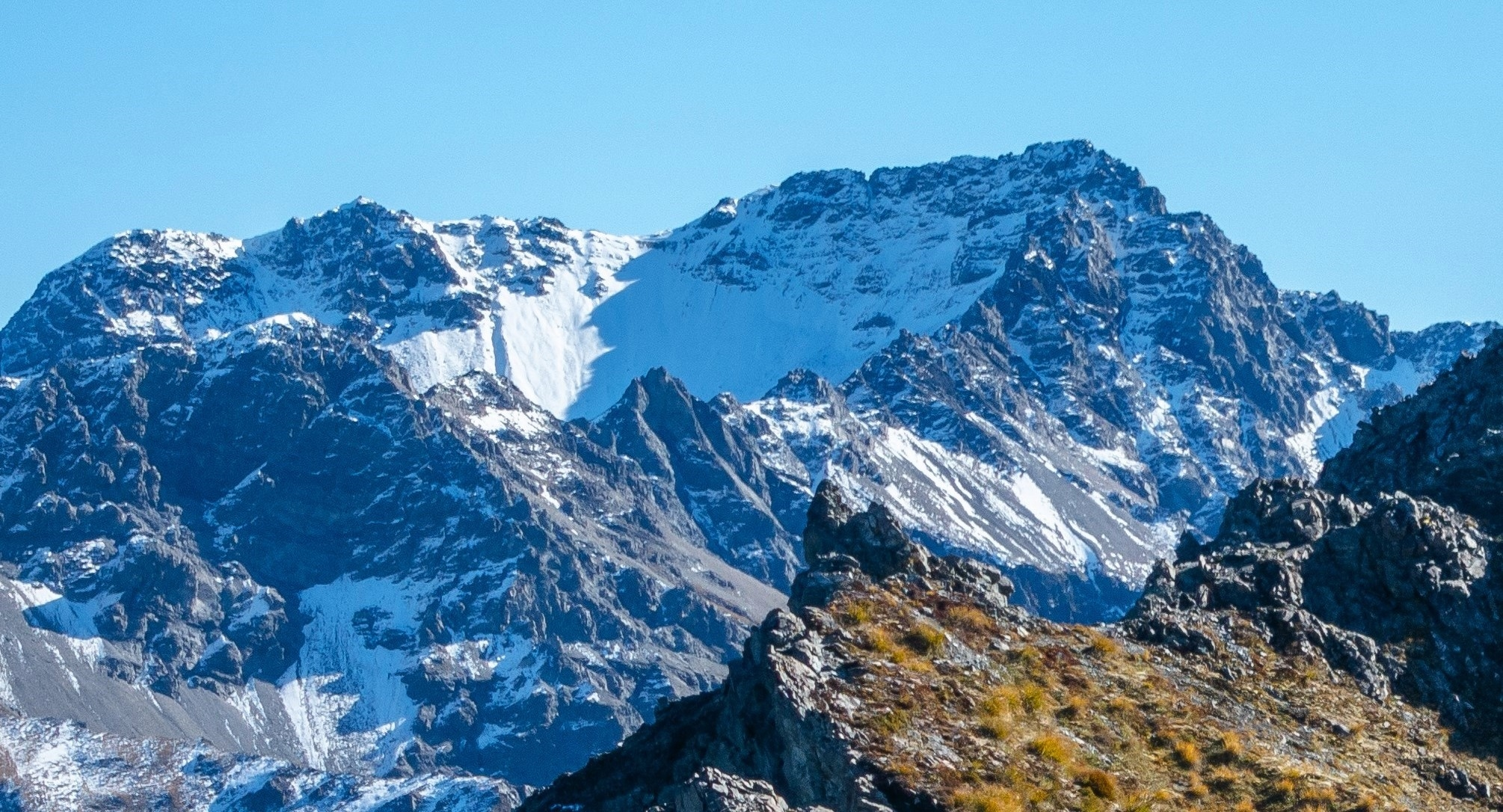
- Southeast aspect

Highest point
- Elevation: 2,035 m (6,677 ft)
- Prominence: 783 m (2,569 ft)
- Isolation: 3.4 km (2.1 mi)
- Coordinates: 42.931754°S 171.678457°E

Geography
- Location within New Zealand
- Interactive map of Mount Wilson
- Location: South Island
- Country: New Zealand
- Region: Canterbury
- Protected area: Arthur's Pass National Park
- Parent range: Southern Alps; Polar Range
- Topo map(s): Topo50 BV21; NZMS260 K33

Geology
- Rock type: Rakaia Terrane

Climbing
- First ascent: December 1930

Mount Wilson is a 2,035-metre-elevation (6,677-foot) mountain in the Canterbury Region of New Zealand.

== Description ==
Mount Wilson is located 112 kilometres (70 mi) northwest of Christchurch in Arthur's Pass National Park in the South Island. It is the highest peak in the Polar Range of the Southern Alps. Precipitation runoff from the mountain's east slope drains to the Hawdon River via Sudden Valley Stream, whereas all other slopes drain to the Edwards River. Topographic relief is significant as the summit rises 935 metres (3,068 feet) above the Edwards Valley in 1.6 kilometres. The nearest higher peak is Mount Oates, 3.4 kilometres to the northwest.

== Climbing ==
The first ascent of the summit was made in December 1930 by Evan Wilson and Andy Anderson via Upper Edwards Valley.

Climbing routes:

- Via Upper Edwards Valley
- South East Ridge
- Via Hawdon Hut
- Via Sudden Valley Stream

== Climate ==
Based on the Köppen climate classification, Mount Wilson is located in a marine west coast (Cfb) climate zone, with a subpolar oceanic climate (Cfc) at the summit. Prevailing westerly winds blow moist air from the Tasman Sea onto the mountains, where the air is forced upwards by the mountains (orographic lift), causing moisture to drop in the form of rain or snow. The months of December through February offer the most favourable weather for viewing or climbing this peak.

== Gallery ==
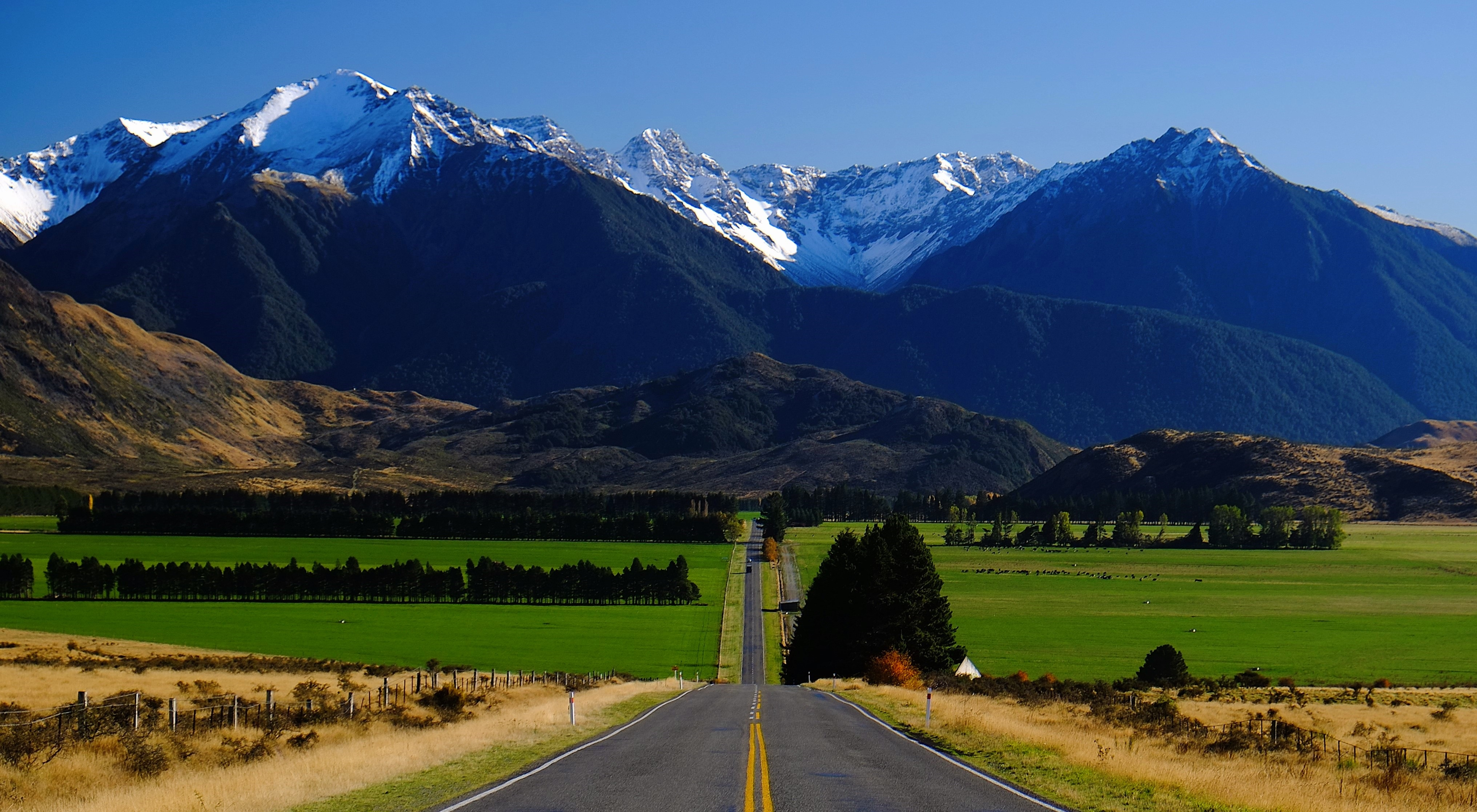
Polar Range (See file annotation for Mount Wilson)

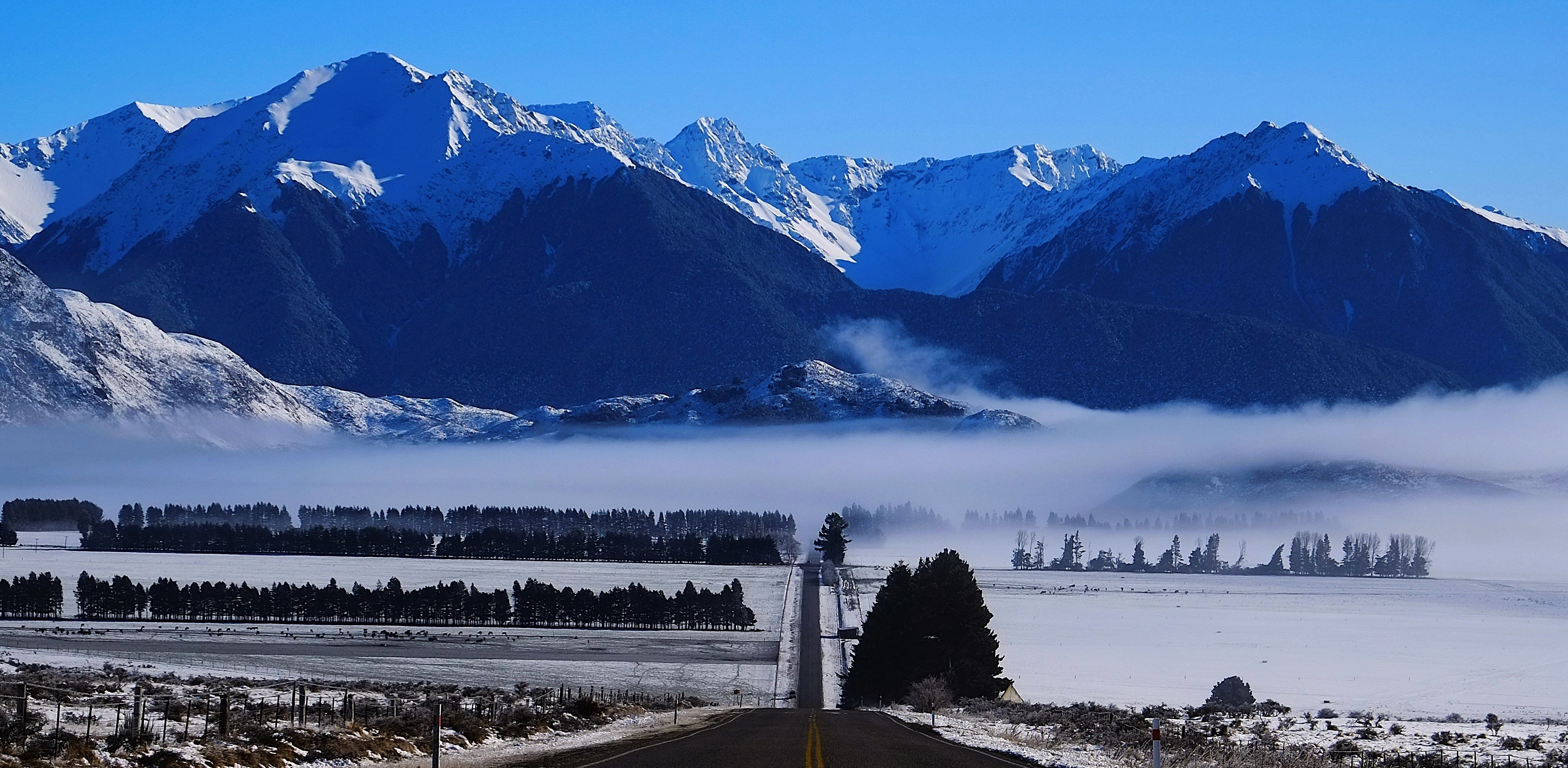
Polar Range in winter

== See also ==
- List of mountains of New Zealand by height
