= Mount Scott =

Mount Scott may refer to:

Antarctica

- Mount Scott (Antarctica), a horseshoe-shaped massif on the Kiev Peninsula

Canada

- Mount Scott (Canada), a mountain on the Continental Divide on the British Columbia-Alberta border

New Zealand

- Mount Scott (New Zealand), a mountain in the Polar Range

United States

- Mount Scott (Oklahoma), a mountain in the Wichita Mountains of southwestern Oklahoma
- Mount Scott (Clackamas County, Oregon), a minor volcano in the Portland, Oregon metropolitan area
- Mount Scott (Klamath County, Oregon), a stratovolcano in Crater Lake National Park in southern Oregon
- Mount Scott (Washington), a mountain summit in Olympic National Park
