= Williams Peak =

Williams Peak may refer to:

== United States ==
- Williams Peak (Alaska)
- Williams Peak, a peak in the Sierra Prieta range, Arizona
- Williams Peak (Colorado)
- Williams Peak (Clearwater County, Idaho)
- Williams Peak (Custer County, Idaho)
- Williams Peak (Valley County, Idaho)
- Williams Peak (Mineral County, Montana), a mountain in Mineral County, Montana
- Williams Peak, on Oklahoma State Highway 44

== Other places ==
- Williams Peak (Antarctica)
- Williams Peak (British Columbia)

== See also ==
- Williams Mountain Highpoint, Colorado
