= Temple Basin =

Ski field in the South Island of New Zealand

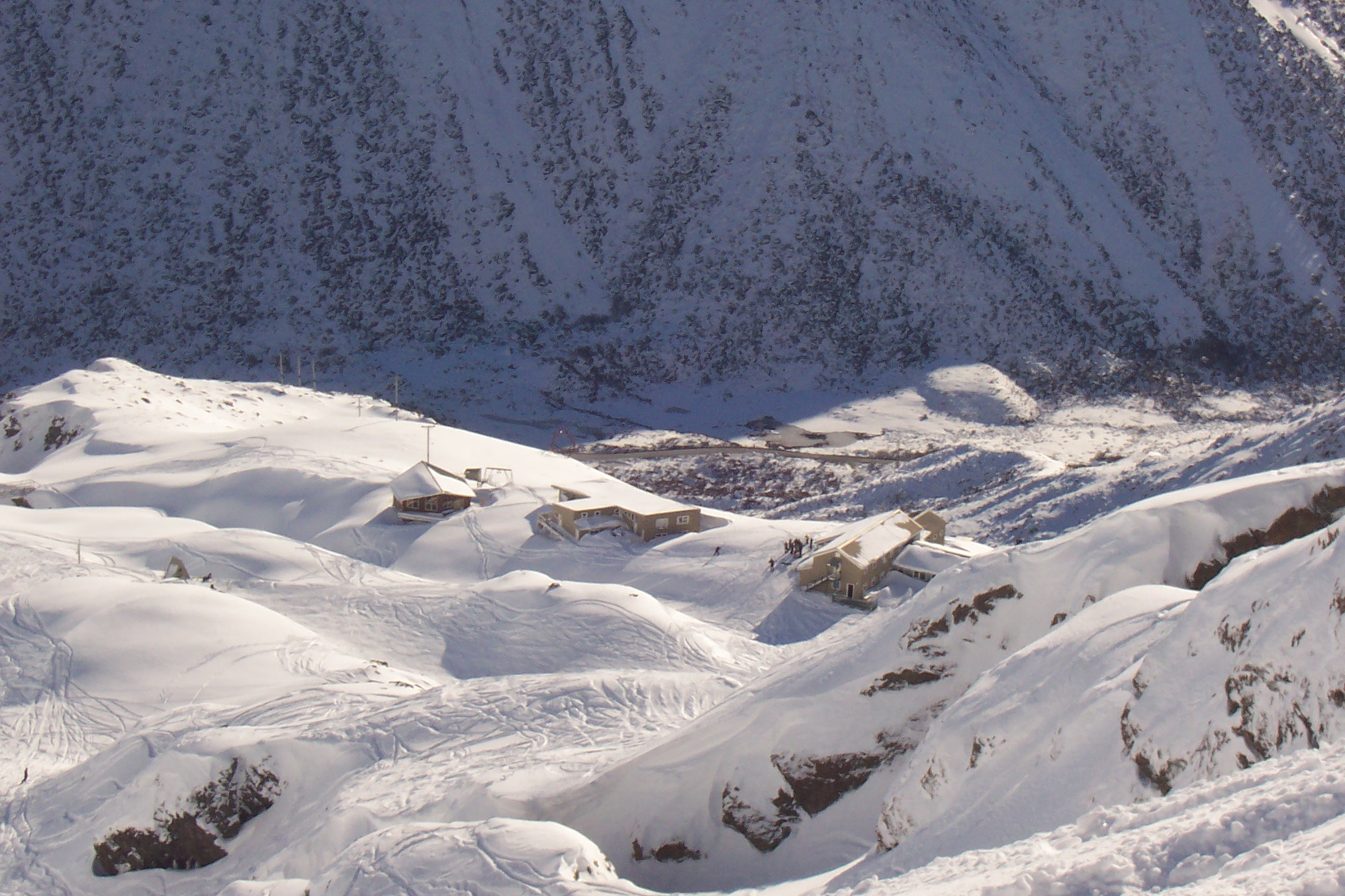
- Interactive map of Temple Basin
- Location: Southern Alps
- Nearest city: Christchurch
- Coordinates: 42.908811°S 171.575463°E
- Top elevation: 1,753 m (5,751 ft)
- Base elevation: 1,326 m (4,350 ft)
- Skiable area: 320 ha (790 acres)
- Trails: Backcountry
- Lift system: 3 Rope tows
- Terrain parks: 0
- Snowmaking: no
- Night skiing: yes
- Website: www.templebasin.co.nz

Temple Basin is a club skifield in Arthur's Pass, in New Zealand's South Island. Operated by two clubs, the Temple Basin Ski Club and the Canterbury University Snow Sports Club, the ski area has 3 rope tows, two on-site lodges, two shelters and a ski school and ski shop. The tows cover an elevation range of 1326–1753 metres, for a skiable domain of 320 hectares. The field claim's to have the best big mountain and variety of terrain in New Zealand and has been highly recommended by adventure skiers on several occasions. The ski area is accessed on foot via a walking track from the Temple Basin Car Park within Arthers Pass. Temple Basin Ski Club operates a motorised goods lift to carry patrons gear and other equipment.

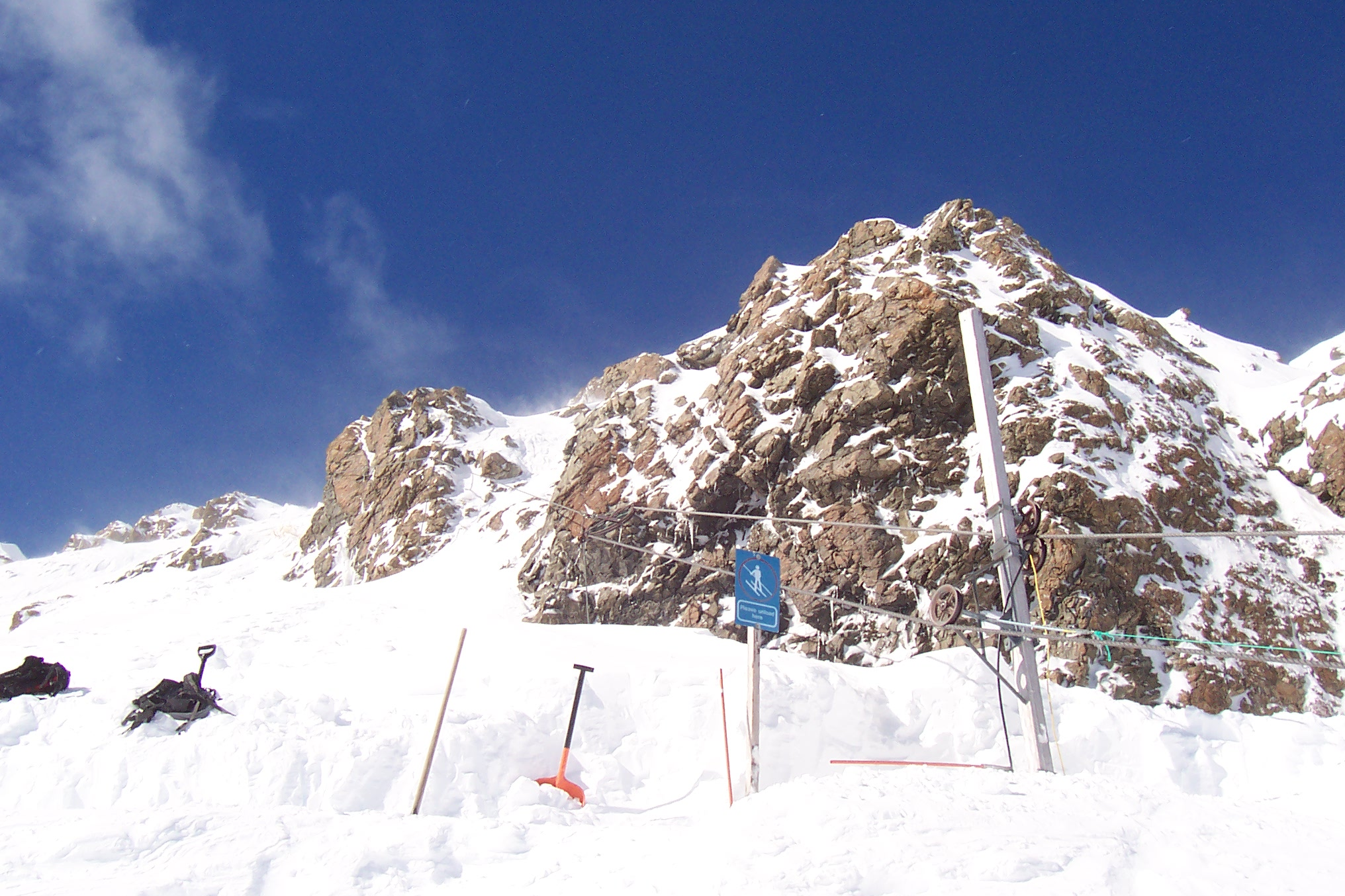
Top of main rope tow

Temple Basin is approximately 2 hours from Christchurch by car, followed by a 45-minute walk. Like many club fields, a good portion of the skiable area is accessible only by hiking, including some hiking between lifts.

The field consists of 4 main basins. Cassidy Tow accesses a smooth open basin with beginner and intermediate terrain. Temple Tow accesses an intermediate slope. Between Cassidy and Temple tows a stream gut offers rock faces and snow traps. A short walk from the top of Temple Tow brings users to Downhill Basin and the fields highest Tow. Downhill consists of a wide open bowl with Blimit and Mt Temples peaks above. A traverse and/or hike from the top of Downhill Tow gives users access to Bills Basin, an intermediate basin with a collection of chutes at the bottom. From the top of Downhill tow one can also hike to the peak accessing the Mingha Valley over the ridge. The Mingha, whilst not patrolled, is commonly used by backcountry skiers and snowboarders.

This field is just on the Western side of the Southern Alps and so receives significantly more snowstorms than those areas further east.

== Accommodation ==
There are two lodges in operation at Temple Basin which together have a maximum capacity of 120 visitors per night. Ferirer Lodge, the larger of the two can accommodate 75 visitors, and boasts hot showers, main's power, wifi and even a chef. CUSSC lodge, maintained by students from Canterbury University accommodates 45 visitors and shares similar amenities. A third building, Lockwood Shelter is maintained by the Canterbury Mountainering Club as a day lodge.

== New Zealand Snow Safety Institute ==
Temple Basin is home to the New Zealand Snow Safety Institute. The New Zealand Snow Safety Institute runs a series of courses throughout the year on aspects of mountaineering and mountain safety. These courses are aimed for climbers, skiers, snowboarders and trampers. The lodges at Temple Basin allows for students to stay on field and watch the snow pack evolve over time aiding the learning of these skills.
