= Mount Williams (Oklahoma) =

Former Artificial Hill in Norman, Oklahoma

Coordinates: 35°14′17″N 97°30′17″W

Mount Williams was a large artificial hill in Norman, Oklahoma; it was built by the United States Navy as the backstop to a firing range. The hill became a minor landmark in the Norman area. It was named after the commander of the base at the time it was built. The hill was located near the Interstate 35–Robinson Street interchange. The hill was colloquially known as "Mount Norman", to Oklahomans outside of the greater Oklahoma City area. While many in the state referred to the hill as "Mount Norman", the hill was also known by locals as "Bullet Mountain", “Bullet Hill” or the “Bullet Mound”.

In 2006, the hill was demolished in order to make room for a Super Target. Before it was demolished, archaeologists with the Oklahoma Department of Transportation, carefully excavated features surrounding Mount Williams. The report can be read on the Oklahoma Department of Transportation's Cultural Resource Department's website. One of the access roads into the Target is named "Mount Williams Drive" to commemorate the old hill.
