= Williams Peak (Valley County, Idaho) =

Summit in Idaho

Coordinates: 45°01′07″N 115°39′46″W

Williams Peak is a summit in the U.S. state of Idaho, with an elevation of 6,814 feet (2,077 m).

Williams Peak has the name of Hubert C. Williams, a forestry official.
