= Mingha River =

River in New Zealand

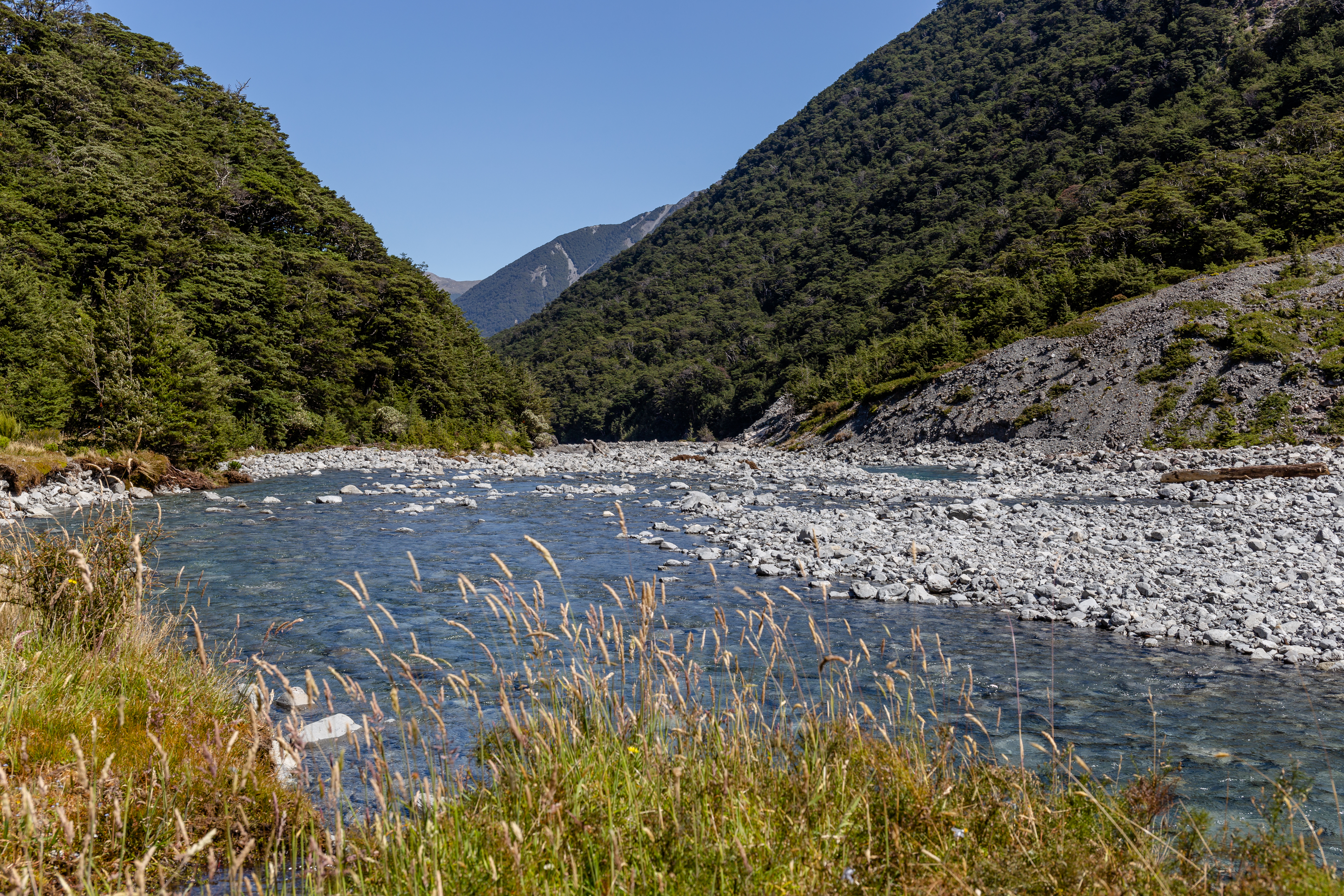
- Mingha River close to Mingha Bivouac
- Route of the Mingha River
- Mouth of the Mingha River Mingha River (South Island)

Location
- Country: New Zealand

Physical characteristics
- Source: Southern Alps
  - coordinates: 42.9102°S 171.5968°E
  - elevation: 1,600 m (5,200 ft)
- Mouth
  - location: Bealey River
  - coordinates: 42°58′42″S 171°35′46″E
  - elevation: 670 m (2,200 ft)
- Length: 11 km (6.8 mi)

Basin features
- Progression: Mingha River → Bealey River → Waimakariri River → Pegasus Bay → Pacific Ocean
- Tributaries
  - left: Edwards River
  - right: Agility Creek

The Mingha River is a river of the Canterbury Region of New Zealand's South Island. It flows east then south from its origin on the slopes of Blimit, meeting the Bealey River 8 kilometres (5 mi) south of Arthur's Pass.

Together with Goat Pass, elevation 1,071 metres (3,514 ft), and the Deception River, the Mingha valley forms a route across the Southern Alps known as the Mingha/Deception. It is used for the mountain running segment of the annual Coast to Coast race.

== See also ==
- List of rivers of New Zealand
