= Scotts Mountain =

Mountain in Warren County, New Jersey

Scotts Mountain, most commonly referred to as Montana Mountain by locals because of the hamlet of Montana on its summit.

Highest point
- Elevation: 1,086 ft (331 m) NGVD 29
- Coordinates: 40°44′32″N 75°04′59″W

Geography
- Location: Warren County, New Jersey, New Jersey, U.S.
- Topo map: USGS Bloomsbury

Climbing
- Easiest route: Hiking

Scotts Mountain is a mountain in Warren County, New Jersey. The mountain covers portions of Harmony, Lopatcong, Franklin and Washington Townships; the main summit rises to 1,086 feet (331 m), and is located in Harmony. It is part of the New York–New Jersey Highlands of the Appalachian Mountains, although somewhat isolated to the west of the main body of the Highlands.

== History ==
An 1834 description read,

Scott’s Mountain, lying in Greenwich, Oxford and Mansfield t-ships, Warren co., forms part of the chain of the South mountain, of which this portion covers much of the area of the three t-ships above named. The height of the mountain here may be 700 to 800 feet above the tide, and it is composed of granitic rock, based on, or breaking through, limestone. It abounds with iron of several varieties, which, for nearly a century, has been extensively worked, near Oxford furnace; where Messrs. Henry and Jordan are, now, extensively engaged in the iron manufacture. The Mountain is generally well wooded, and the valleys fruitful.
