= Edwards River (Mid Canterbury) =

River in the South Island, New Zealand

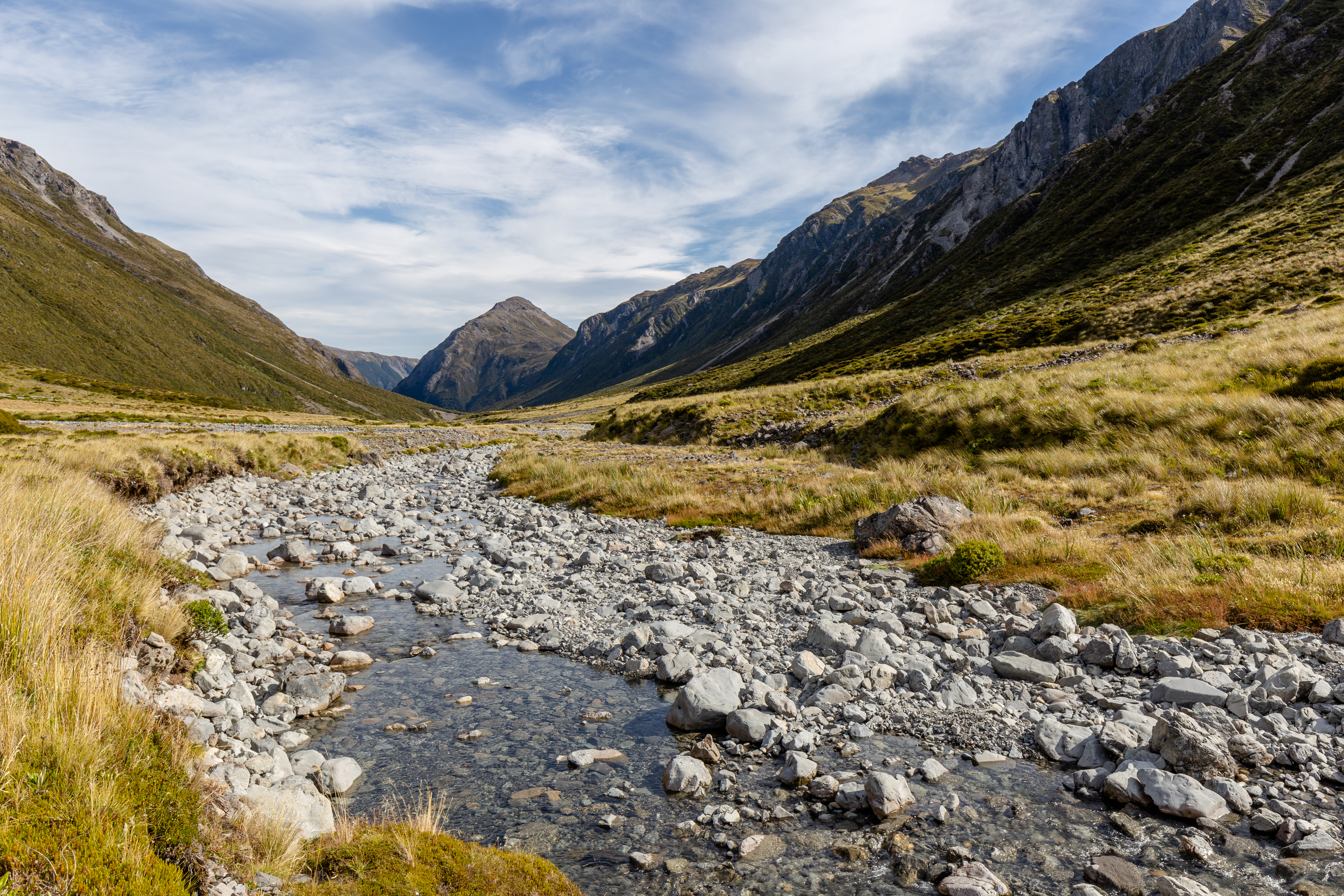
- Route of the Edwards River
- Mouth of the Edwards River Edwards River (Mid Canterbury) (South Island)

Location
- Country: New Zealand

Physical characteristics
- Source: Taruahuna Pass
  - coordinates: 42.9019°S 171.6725°E
- 2nd source: Polar Range (East Branch)
  - coordinates: 42.9404°S 171.6775°E
- Mouth
  - location: Mingha River
  - coordinates: 42°58′24″S 171°36′08″E
- Length: 12 km (7.5 mi)

Basin features
- Progression: Edwards River → Mingha River → Bealey River → Waimakariri River → Pegasus Bay → Pacific Ocean

The Edwards River is a river of New Zealand. A tributary of the Bealey River, it arises in the Polar Range to the east of Arthur's Pass and flows south-west within Arthur's Pass National Park. The Mingha River joins it just before it enters the Bealey. It is one of the headwaters of the Waimakariri River.

A tramping track runs part of the way along the river to a backcountry hut.

== See also ==
- List of rivers of New Zealand
