= Waste weir =

Slatted gate on a navigable canal

A waste weir on a navigable canal is a slatted gate on each canal level or pound, to remove excess water and to drain the canal for repairs or for the winter shutdown. This differs for a dam or reservoir, for which a waste weir is another name for a spillway, i.e. not having the boards to adjust the water height nor the paddles to drain all the water as on a canal, only to drain the excess.

== Uses ==
Example of a waste weir to regulate water level. (Looking from above)

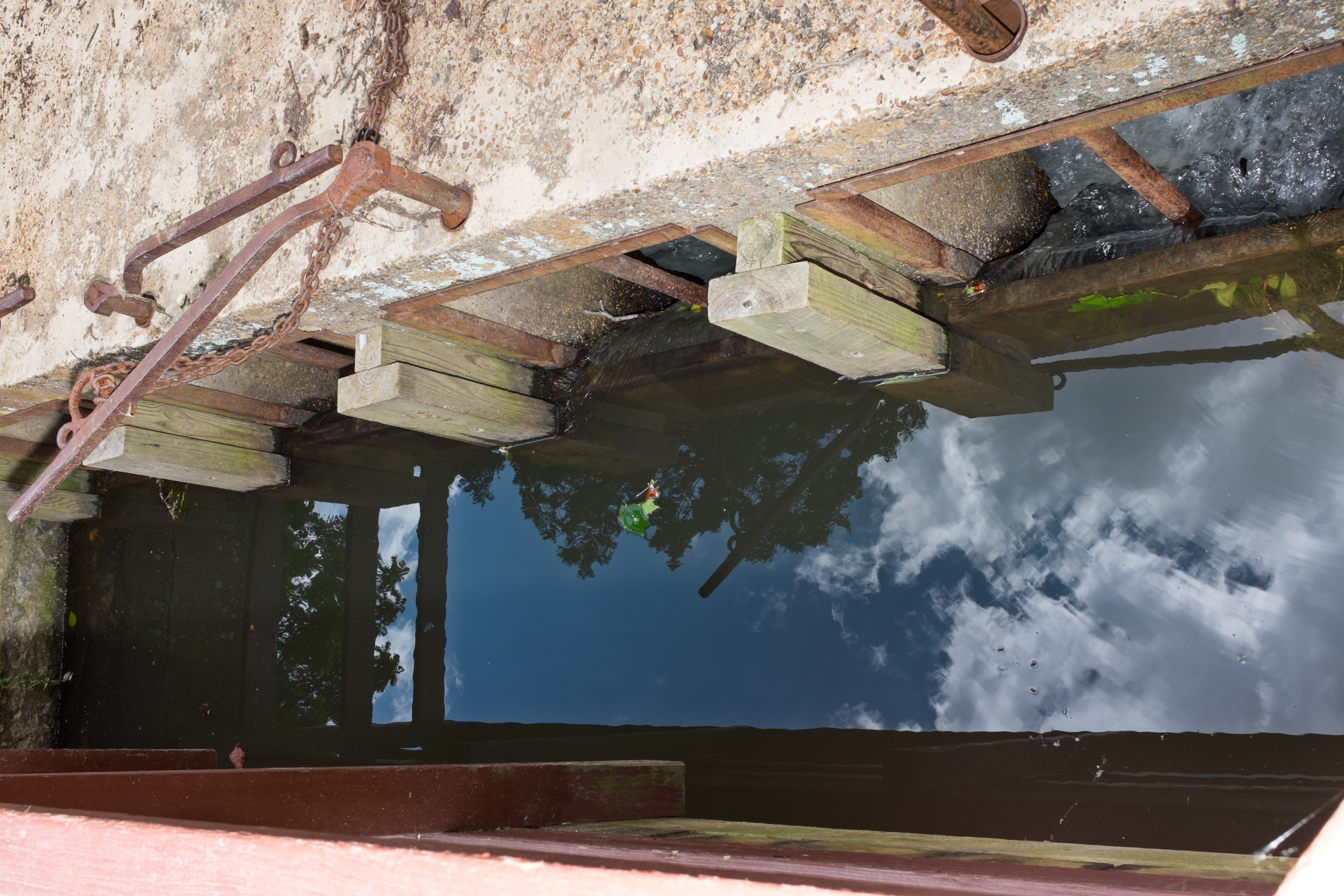
Paddle valves closed, and boards put in. Topmost board determines height of water in pound.

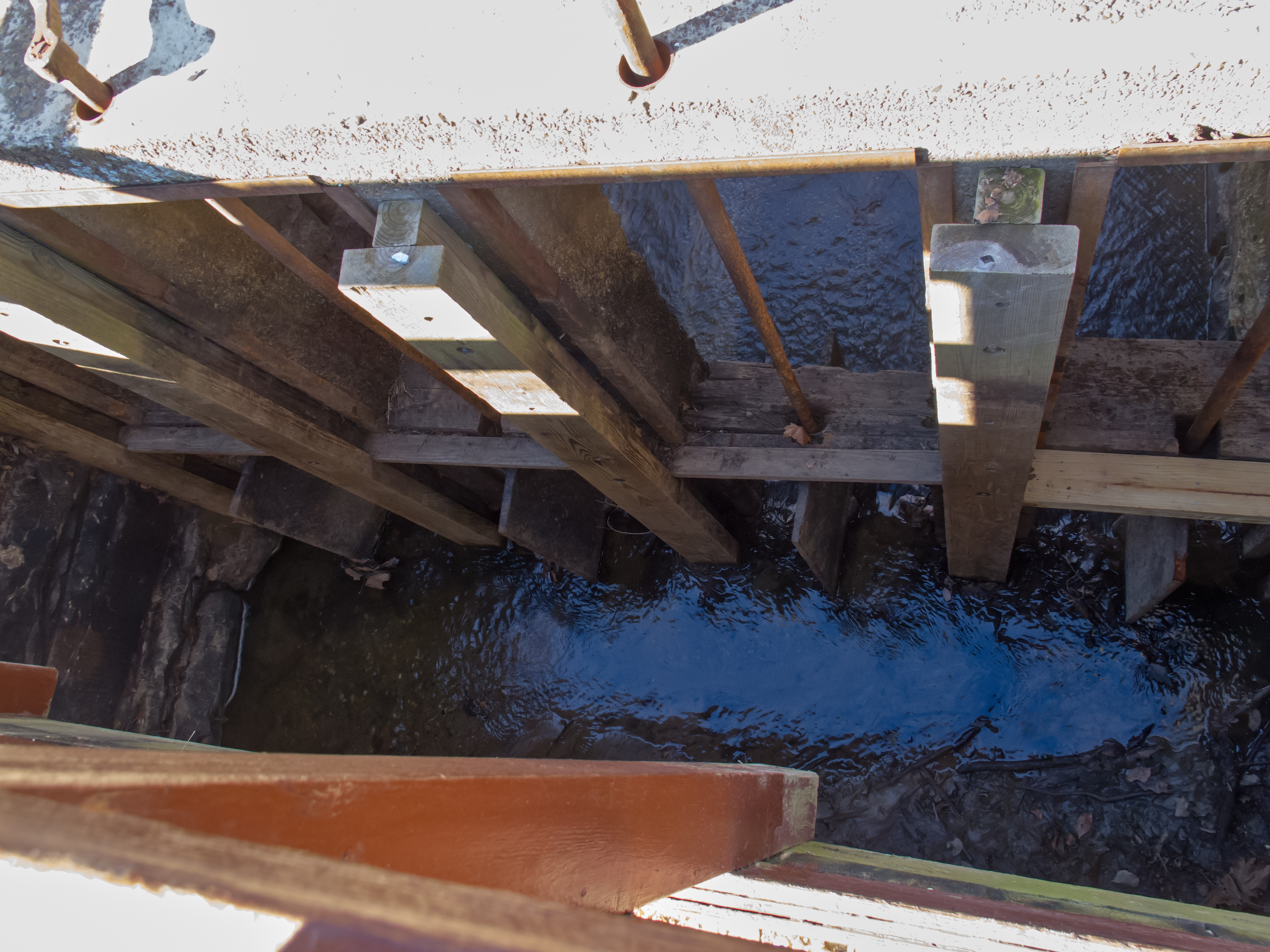
Same waste weir with valves open and boards taken out, to drain canal prism.

A canal will often need some means to maintain a water level. A canal constantly consumes water due to leakage, evaporation, and the operation of lift locks. Nevertheless, excess water from storms or emptying locks could cause problems by eroding the banks of a canal, causing washouts, and flooding buildings or adjacent properties. Waste weirs were one of several measures used to remove surplus water. The waste weir also functioned as an opening to drain the entire canal prism of water for repairs, or for winter (to avoid damage from freezing water), or in anticipation of flooding.

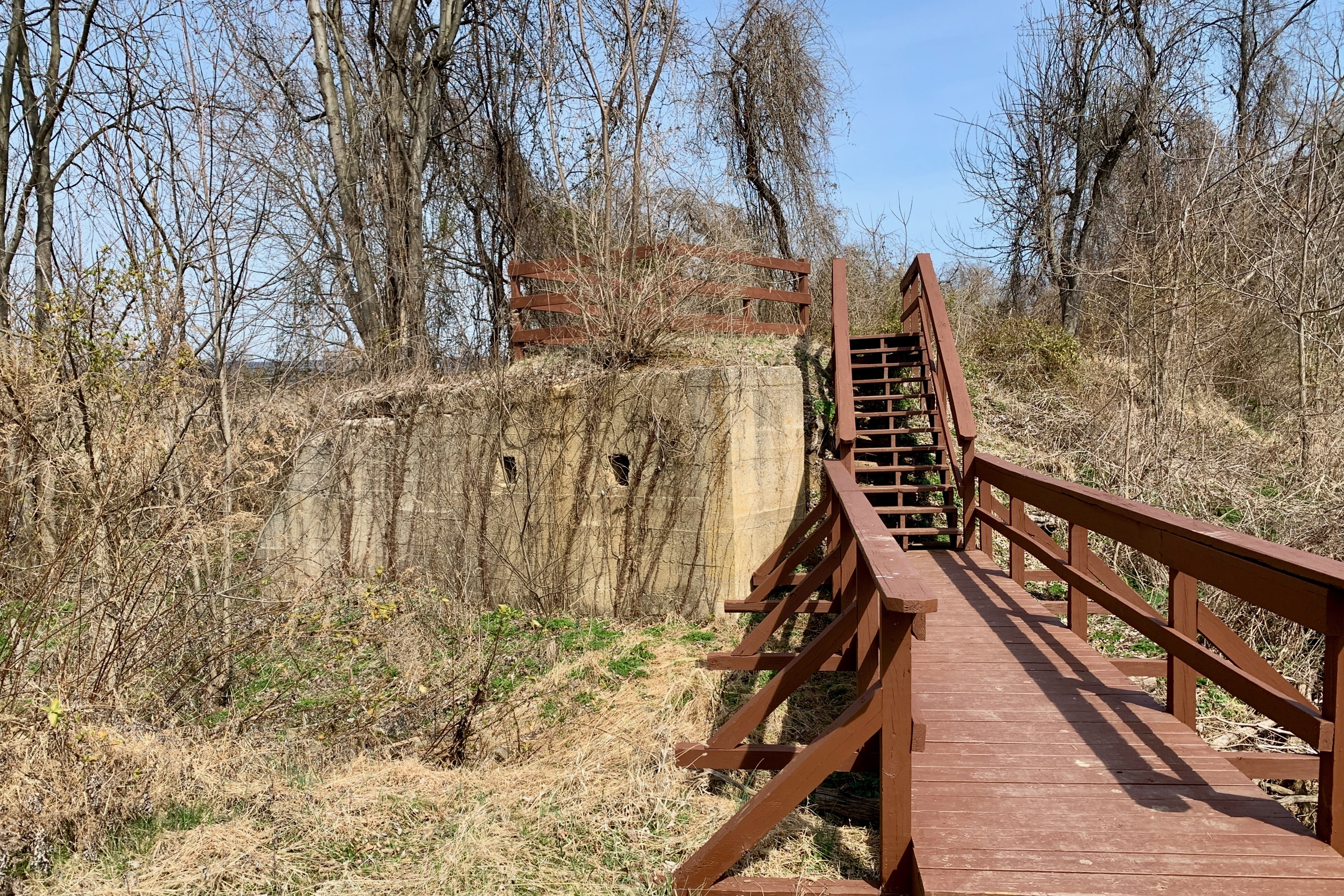
Morris Canal Overflow and Waste Weir site

In some cases when a creek was used to feed the canal, a waste weir was necessary for excess water from the creek. For instance, on the Morris Canal, the Lopatcong Creek went into the canal to feed it, but it had a tendency to flood, hence the need for a couple of waste weirs in the area around the bottom of Inclined Plane 9 West near Port Warren, New Jersey (near Strykers Road today).

Reservoirs and tanks also use a waste weir for flood discharges.

== Design ==
Engineering drawing of a waste weir from the Chesapeake and Ohio Canal

The maximum flow output $Q$ in cubic meters/sec over the top of the waste weir with a length $L$ and height of water $H$ above the crest can be calculated by the formulas:

$$Q = KLH ^ {3/2}$$

and

$$K= \frac{2}{3}  C_d \sqrt{2g}$$

where g=gravitational constant of $9.8 m/{sec^2}$ and Cd is the coefficient of discharge over the weir. Various values of Cd can be given as follows:

Crest type	$C_d$
Weir with crest up to one meter in width	0.625
Weir with crest greater than one meter in width	0.562
Rough stone sloping escape	0.500
Flush escape (no drop)	0.437

== Construction ==
Construction methods varied depending on the canal. On the Erie Canal and the Chesapeake and Ohio Canal, waste weirs were often constructed from masonry or concrete.

== Law ==
Since a waste weir was part of canal property, it would sometimes be explicitly protected by law. On the Morris Canal, New Jersey Statute 136 section 61 stated that for willfully and maliciously opening the gates of waste weirs the penalty was $25.

== Gallery ==
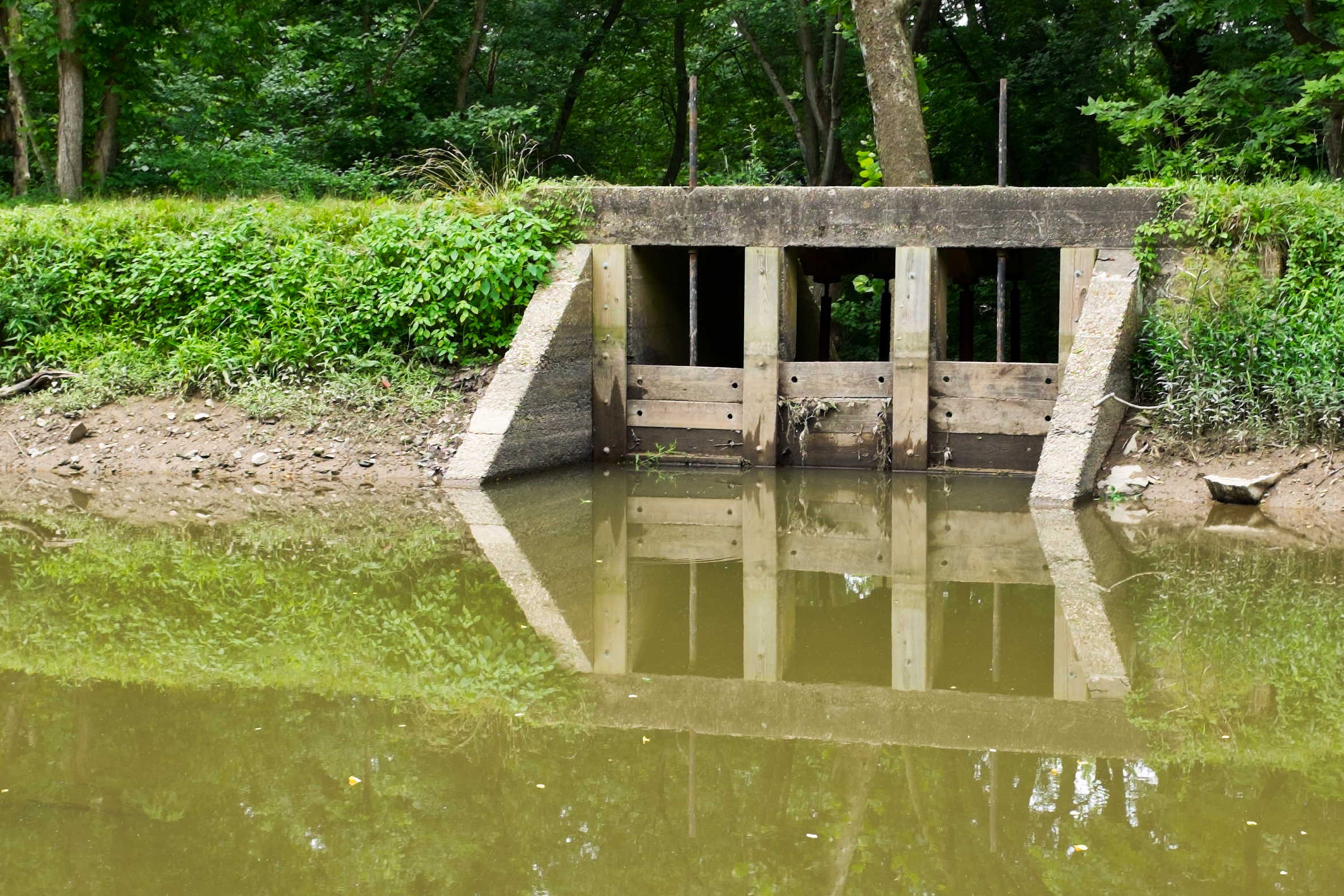
Waste weir. Note boards to adjust water height. The wicket at Pennyfield lock were open, draining the canal of water, hence, why the water level is lower than the boards.

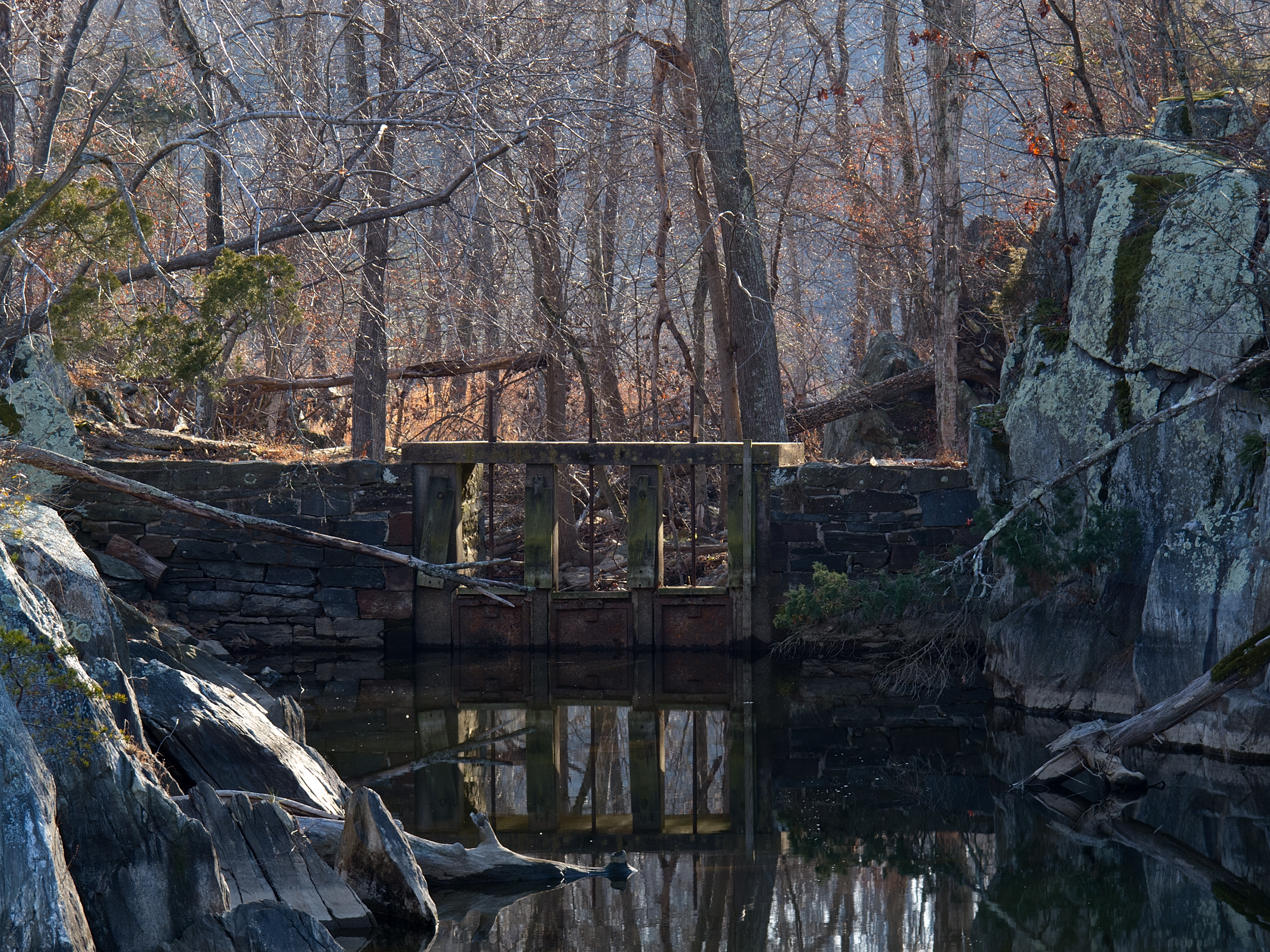
Boards are out. Note the iron wickets (paddle valves) closed. Those could be opened to drain the canal further.

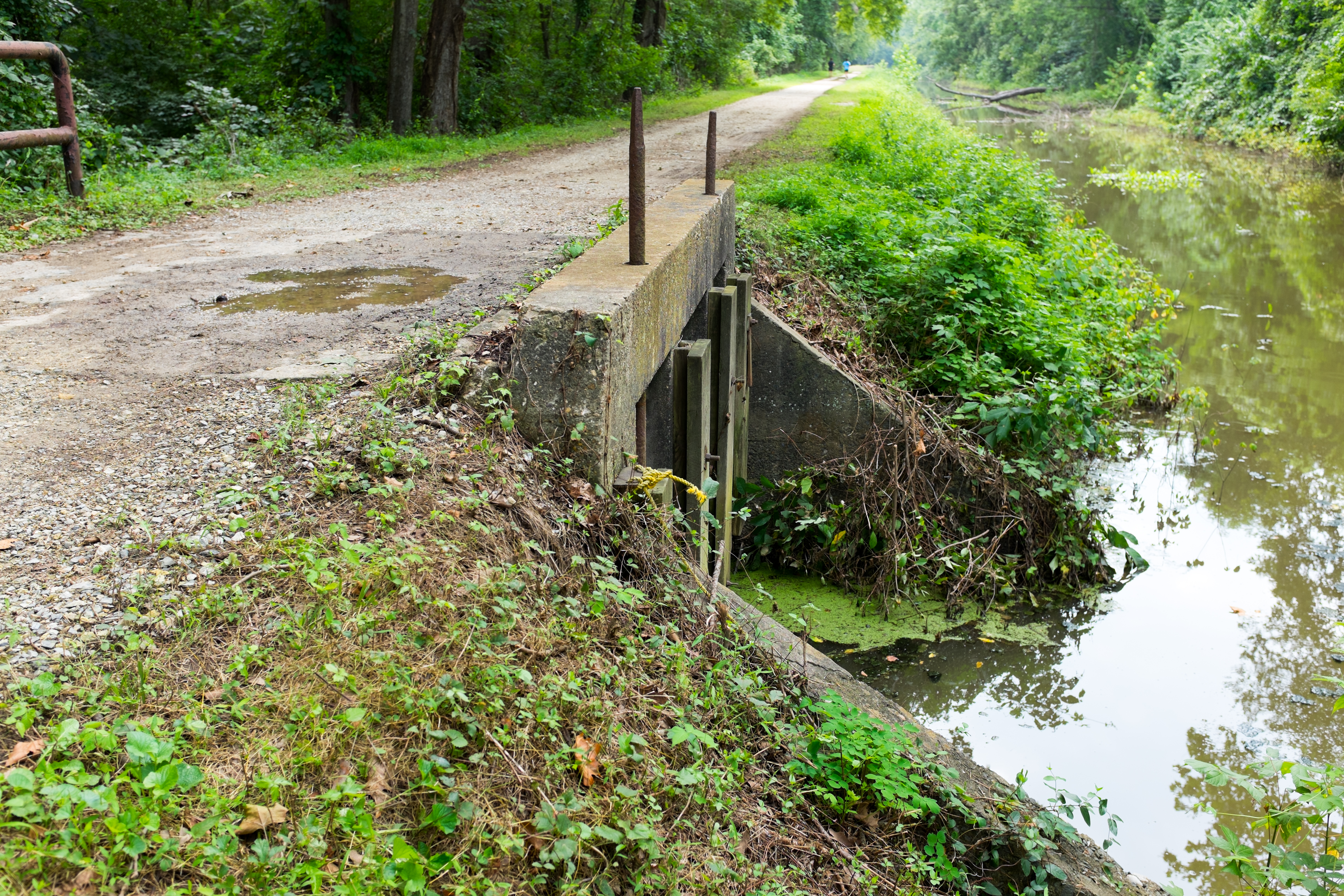
Concrete Waste weir. Note rods for attaching handles to control paddle valves.

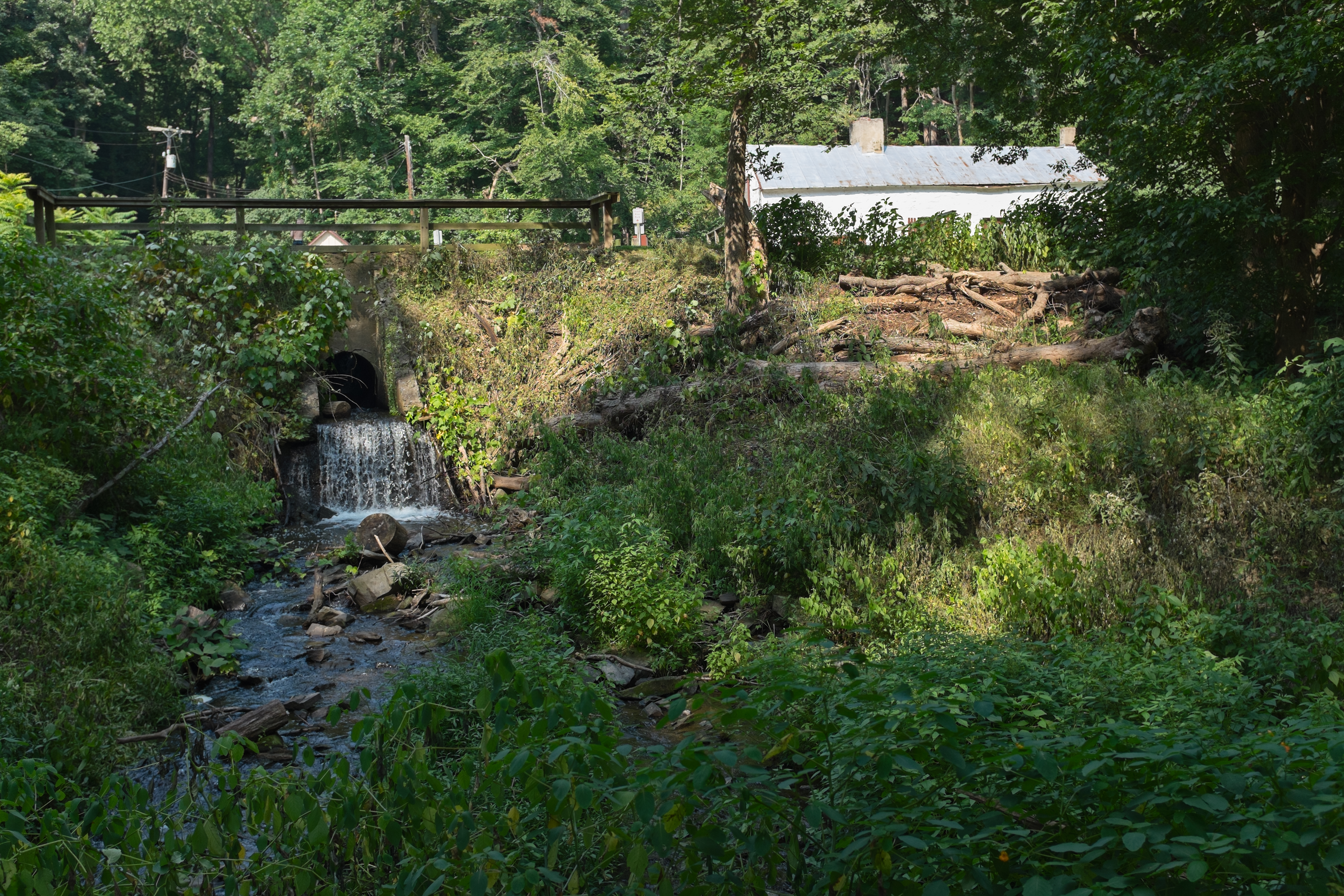
Outflow from the waste weir at Swain's Lock.

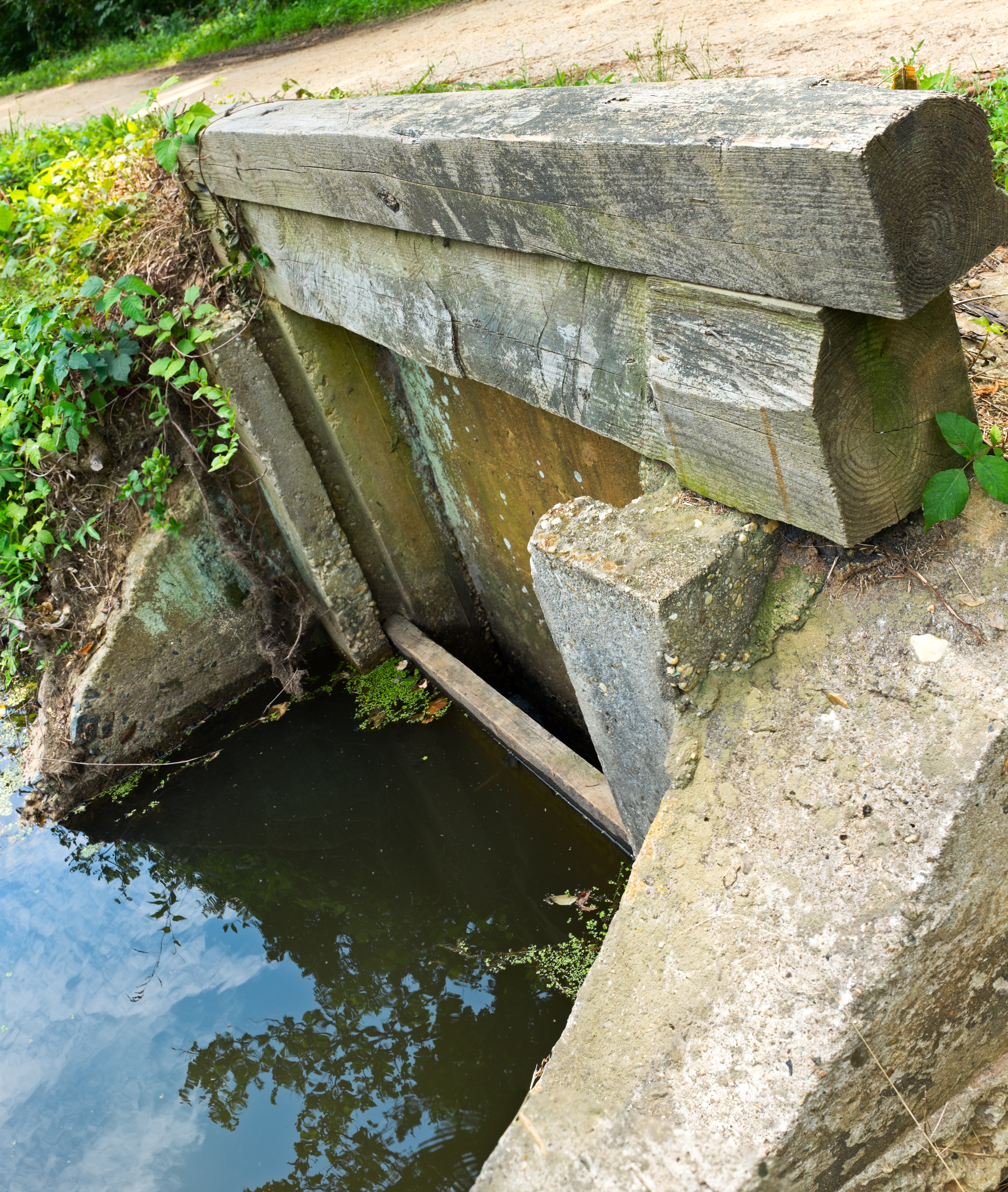
A small waste weir without paddle valves to drain the prism.

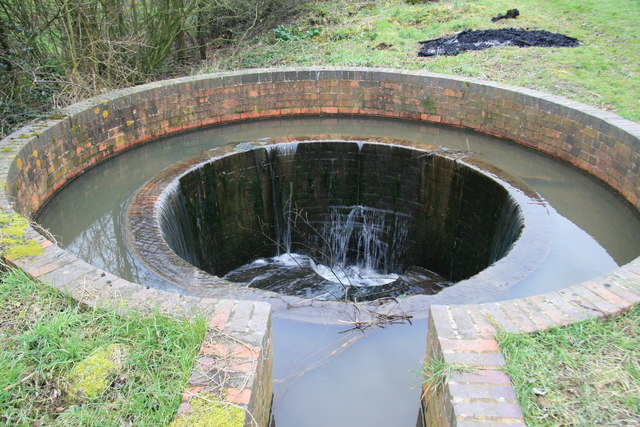
A circular overflow weir on the Droitwich canal
