= Port Warren, New Jersey =

Populated place in Warren County, New Jersey, US

- Unincorporated community
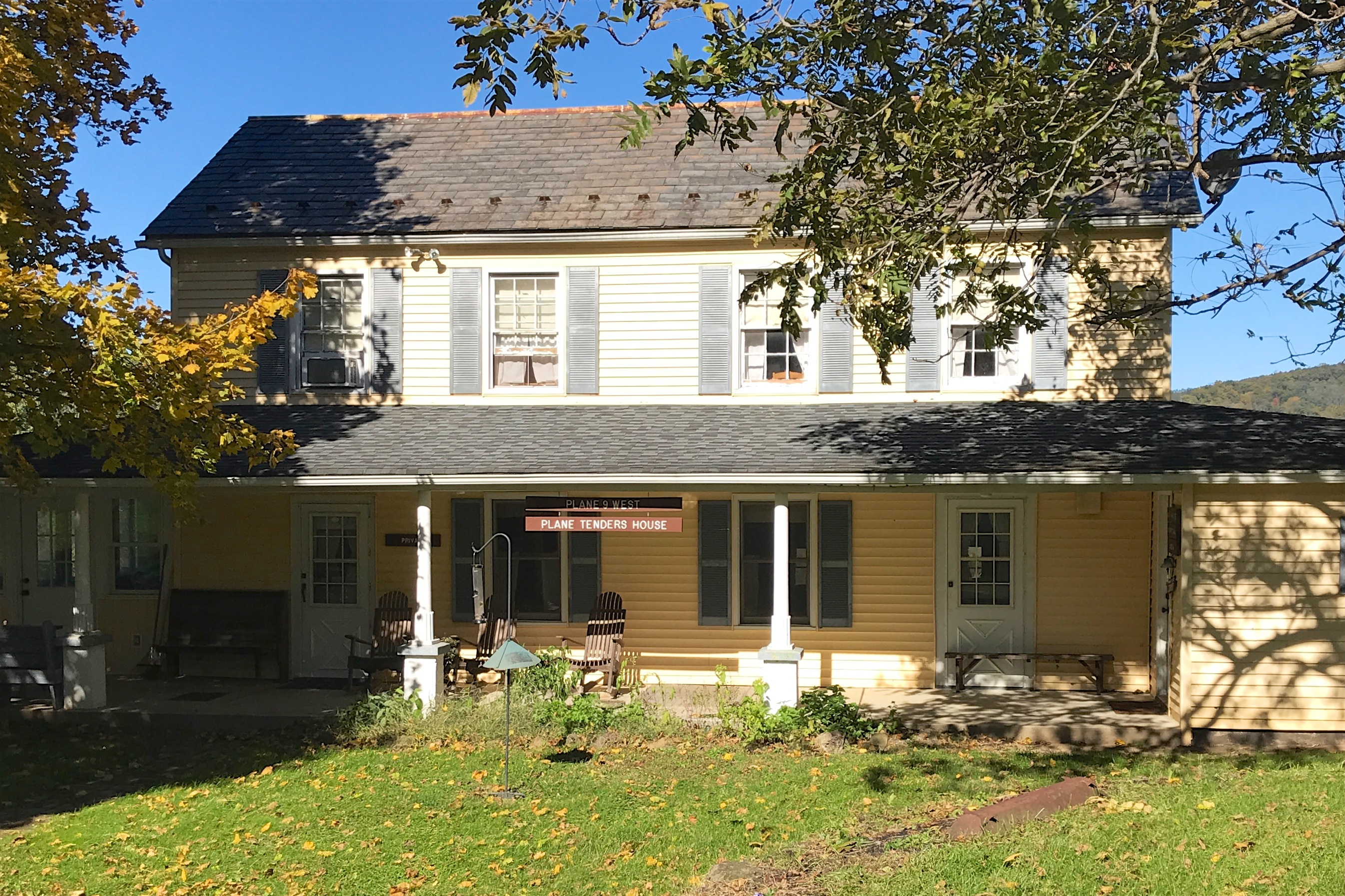
- Jim and Mary Lee Morris Canal Museum

- Location within Warren County, New Jersey Location within New Jersey Location within the United States
- Coordinates: 40°41′41″N 75°08′26″W
- Country: United States
- State: New Jersey
- County: Warren
- Township: Greenwich
- Elevation: 259 ft (79 m)
- Time zone: UTC−05:00 (Eastern (EST))
  - Summer (DST): UTC−04:00 (EDT)
- GNIS feature ID: 879449

Port Warren is an unincorporated community located within Greenwich Township in Warren County, New Jersey.

Inclined Plane 9 West of the Morris Canal was located here. It was the largest plane of the canal and also one of only three double-track planes. The plane tender's house is now the Jim and Mary Lee Morris Canal Museum. The interaction of the Lopatcong Creek with the canal resulted in building an overflow and waste weir downstream of the inclined plane.

== Gallery ==
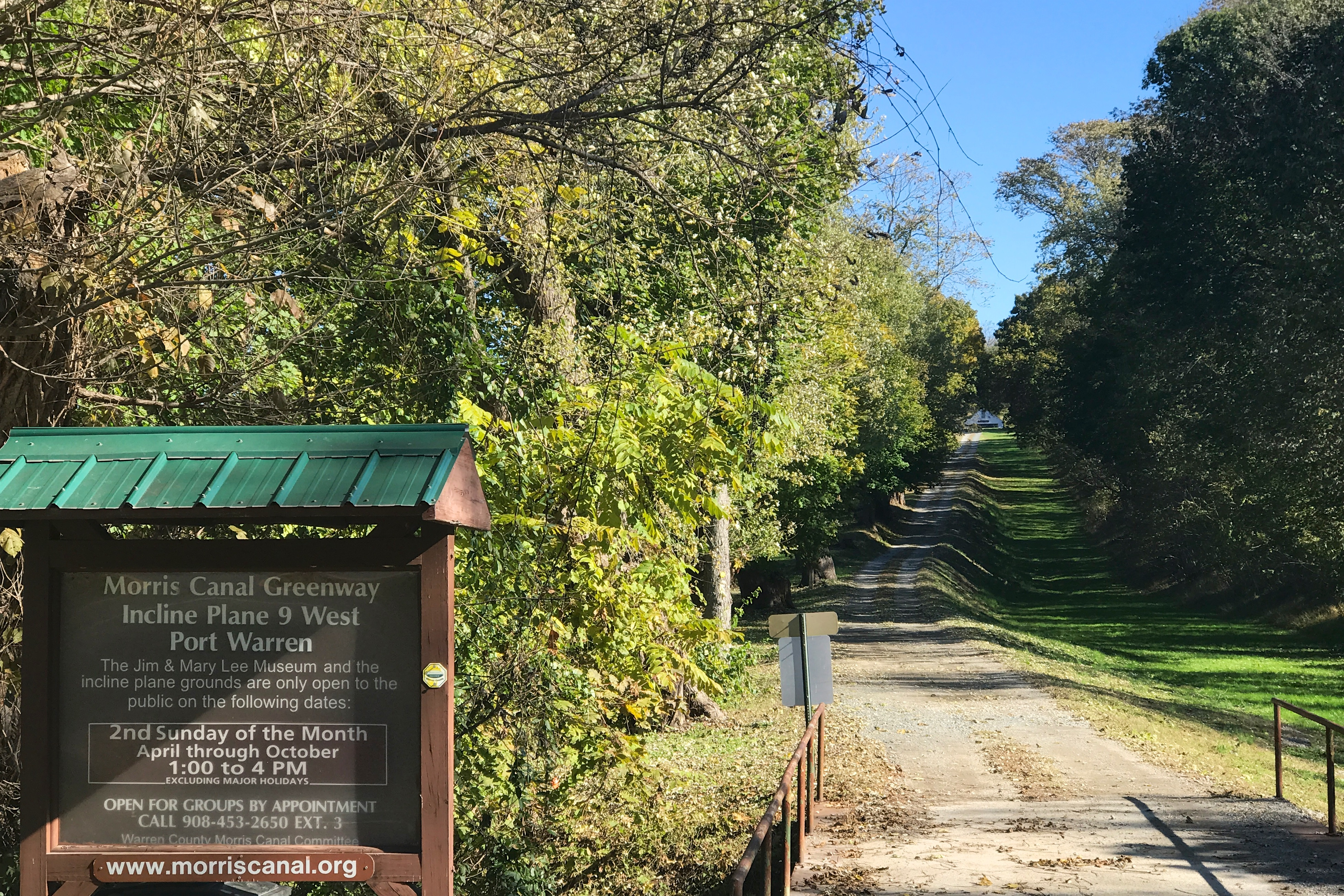
View looking toward the summit of Inclined Plane 9 West of the Morris Canal

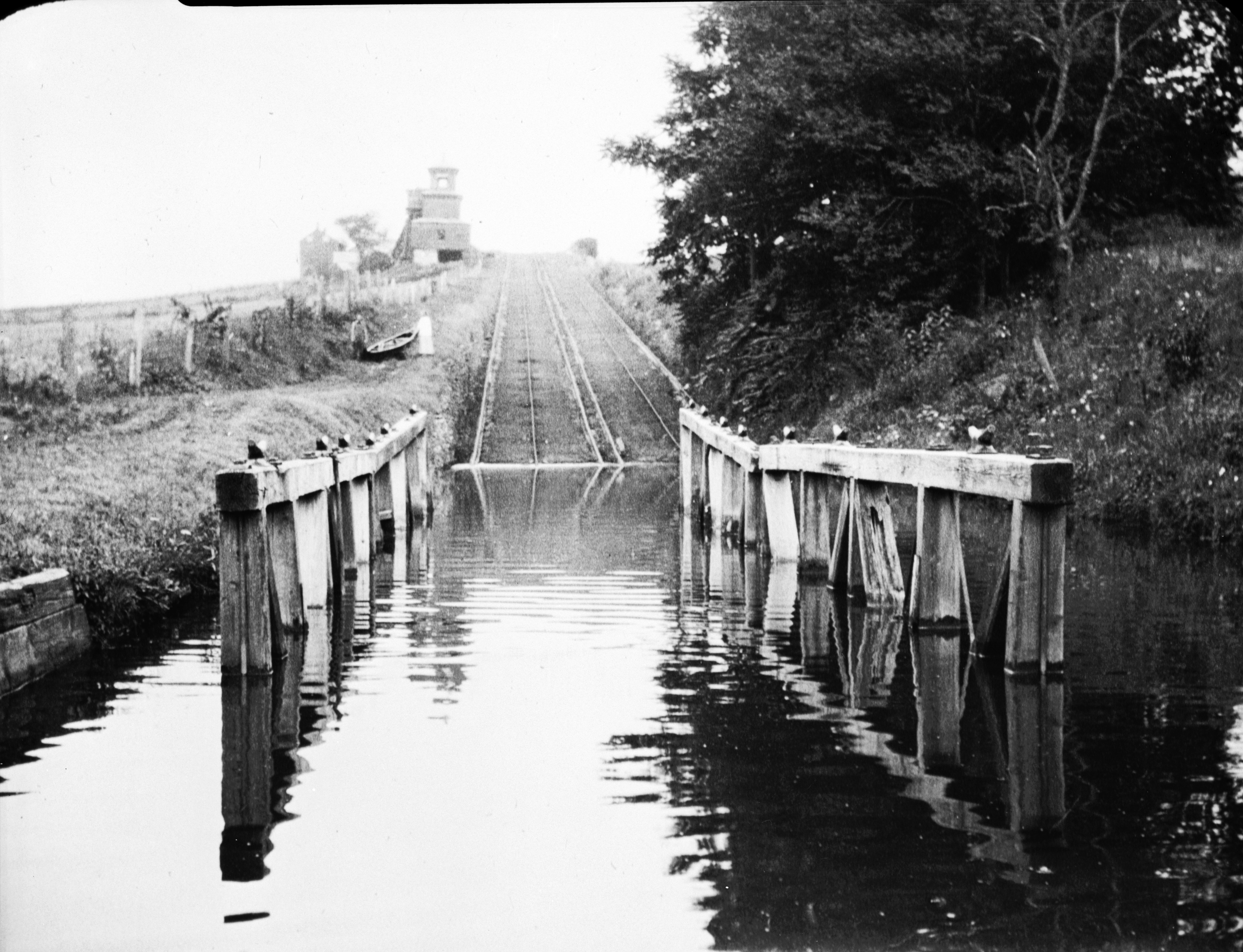
Similar view from the Historic American Engineering Record

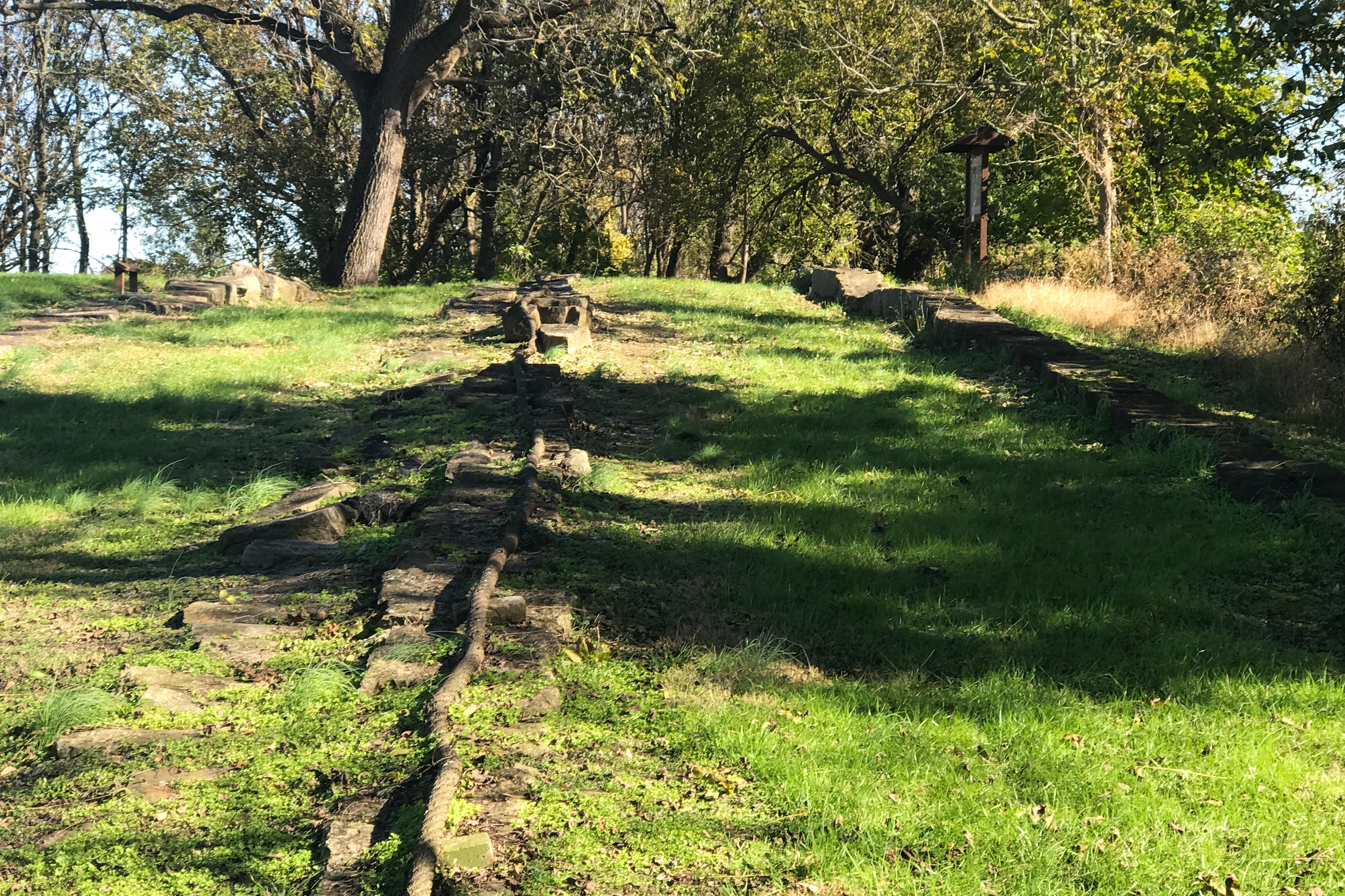
Cables on sleeper stones at the summit

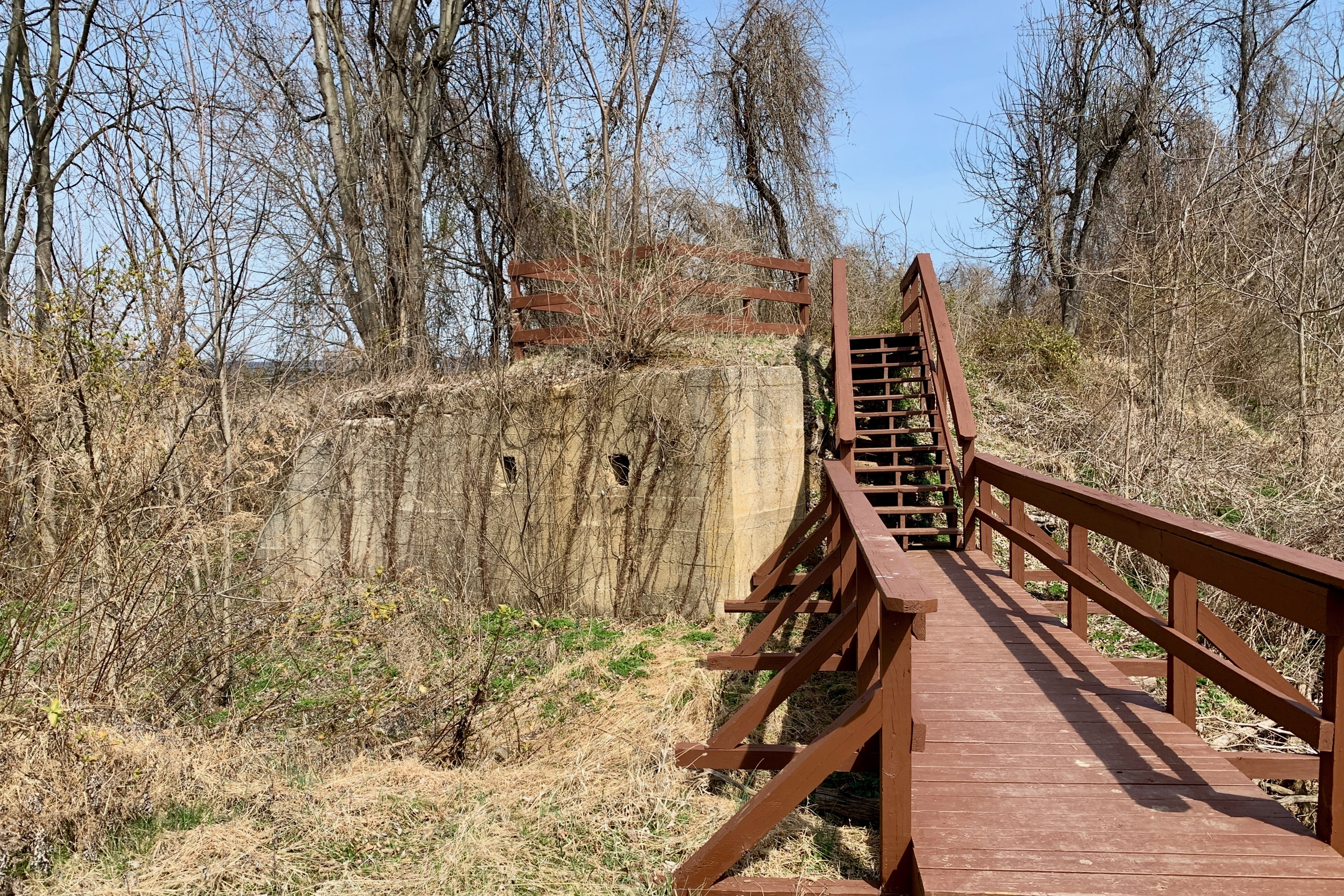
Overflow and waste weir site
