= Lopatcong Creek =

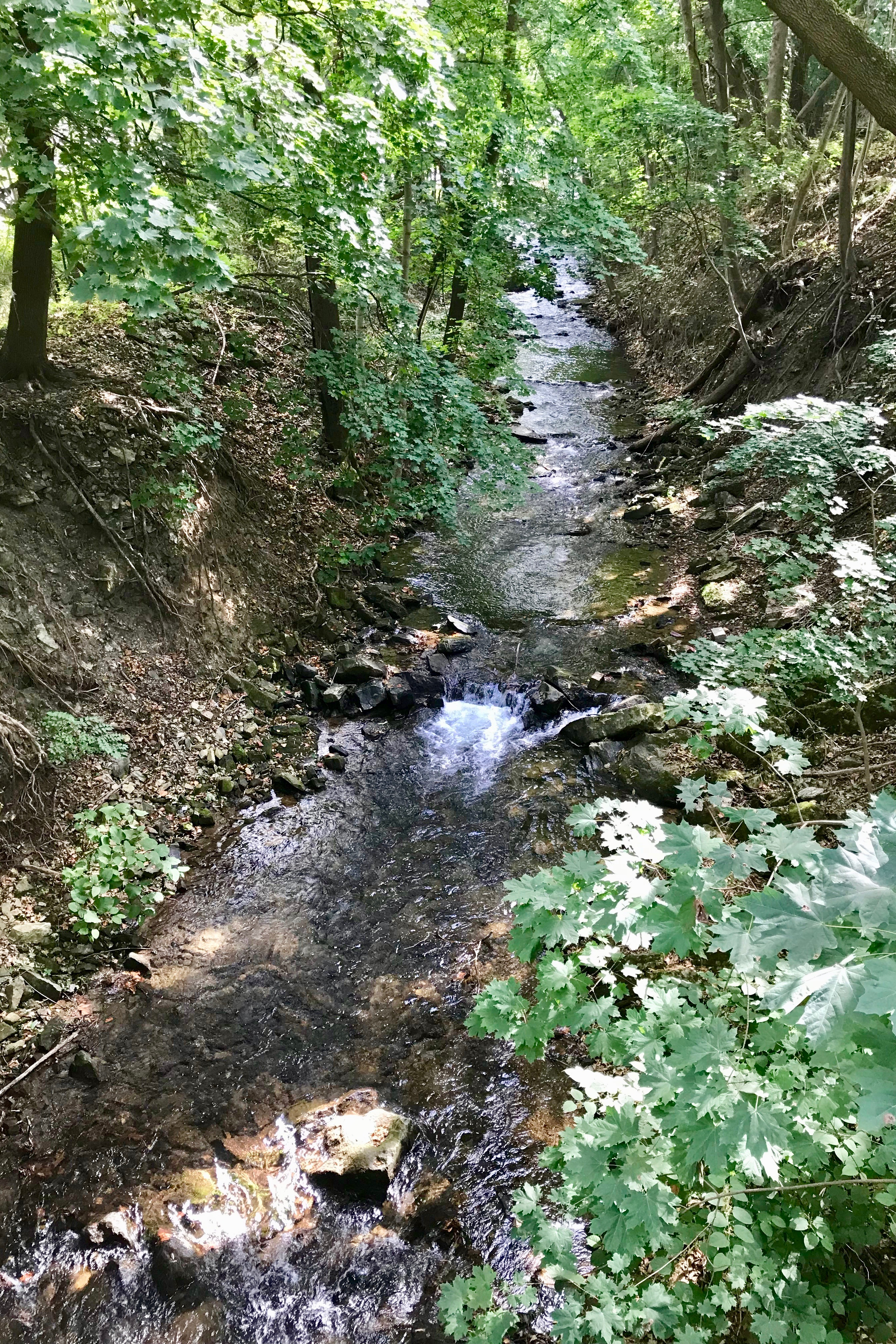
- Lopatcong Creek in Phillipsburg, New Jersey near the former Morris Canal

Location
- Country: United States
- State: New Jersey
- Region: Warren County

Physical characteristics
- Source: Scotts Mountain
- Mouth: Delaware River
  - location: Phillipsburg
  - coordinates: 40°40′45″N 75°10′42″W

Basin features
- River system: Delaware River

Lopatcong Creek is a 12.0-mile-long (19.3 km) tributary of the Delaware River in Warren County, New Jersey in the United States.

The source of the stream is Scotts Mountain in Harmony Township. It was one of the chief water sources for the Morris Canal, in particular from Inclined Plane 9 West in Port Warren to Lock 10 West in the Green's Bridge section of Phillipsburg.

The Lopatcong joins the Delaware in Phillipsburg. The name of the creek is derived from the Lenni Lenape — Lowan peek achtu onk, which meant "winter watering place for deer," or "at the swift river".

== See also ==
- List of rivers of New Jersey
