= 1999 in New Zealand =

- Decades: 1970s; 1980s; 1990s; 2000s; 2010s
- See also: History of New Zealand; List of years in New Zealand; Timeline of New Zealand history

The following lists events that happened during 1999 in New Zealand.

== Population ==
- Estimated population as of 31 December: 3,851,100.
- Increase since 31 December 1998: 22,500 (0.57%).
- Males per 100 Females: 96.5.

== Incumbents ==
=== Regal and viceregal ===
- Head of State - Elizabeth II
- Governor-General - The Rt Hon. Sir Michael Hardie Boys GNZM, GCMG, QSO

=== Government ===
The 45th New Zealand Parliament continued. until the general election, held 27 November for the 46th New Zealand Parliament starting 10 December. The governing National Party was defeated. The Labour Party, led by Helen Clark, in coalition with Alliance, led by Jim Anderton, formed the new government.

- Speaker of the House - Doug Kidd then Jonathan Hunt
- Prime Minister - Jenny Shipley then Helen Clark
- Deputy Prime Minister - Wyatt Creech then Jim Anderton
- Minister of Finance - Bill Birch then Bill English then Bill Birch then Michael Cullen
- Minister of Foreign Affairs - Don McKinnon then Phil Goff
- Chief Justice — Sir Thomas Eichelbaum (until 17 May), Sian Elias (starting 17 May)

=== Opposition leaders ===
See: Category:Parliament of New Zealand, New Zealand elections

- National - TBD (Leader of the Opposition)
- Greens - Jeanette Fitzsimons and Rod Donald
- Act - TBD
- New Zealand First - Winston Peters
- United New Zealand - TBD

=== Main centre leaders ===
- Mayor of Auckland – Christine Fletcher
- Mayor of Hamilton – Russ Rimmington
- Mayor of Wellington – Mark Blumsky
- Mayor of Christchurch – Garry Moore
- Mayor of Dunedin – Sukhi Turner

== Events ==
- The Animal Welfare Act 1999 is passed into law
- The Pohatu Marine Reserve was formally established
- Kapiti Island is declared free of mammalian predators.
- 3 May: The Daily Telegraph and The Hawke's Bay Herald Tribune merge to form Hawke's Bay Today.
- 7 July: A daytime meteor is visible throughout New Zealand.
- 11–15 September: State visit by United States President Bill Clinton to attend the 11th Asia-Pacific Economic Cooperation Leaders meeting; the second Presidential visit after Lyndon Johnson in 1966; see Visit.
- 6 October: A rock avalanche from Mount Adams blocks the Poerua River, forming a dam. It failed on 12 October after significant rain.
- 11 October: United Nations Secretary-General Kofi Annan visits New Zealand.
- 26 October: A magnitude 6.2 earthquake strikes west of Taupō.
- 27 November: The last "dry" electorates in New Zealand (Eden, Roskill and Tawa) voted to go "wet" and to allow alcohol sales.
- 1 December: Changes to alcohol licensing in the Sale of Liquor Amendment Act: Sunday sales in on-licence and off licence premises, supermarkets could sell beer (they sold wine from 1989) and the drinking age dropped from 20 to 18; the changes were passed by Parliament, 59 to 55.

== Arts and literature ==
- Michael King and Paula Boock win the Robert Burns Fellowship.
- Montana New Zealand Book Awards:
  - Montana Medal: Heather Nicholson, The Loving Stitch: A history of knitting and spinning in New Zealand
  - Deutz Medal: Elizabeth Knox, The Vintner's Luck
  - Reader's Choice: Elizabeth Knox, The Vintner's Luck
  - First Book Awards
    - Fiction: Willian Brandt, Alpha Male
    - Poetry: Kate Camp, Unfamiliar Legends of the Stars
    - Non-Fiction: Helen Schamroth, 100 New Zealand Craft Artists

See 1999 in art, 1999 in literature, Category:1999 books

=== Music ===
==== New Zealand Music Awards ====
Winners are shown first with nominees underneath.

- Album of the Year: The Feelers - Supersystem
  - Che Fu - 2b S Pacific
  - Neil Finn - Try Whistling This
- Single of the Year: Che Fu - Scene III
  - The Feelers - Venus
  - Ardijah - Love So Right
- Top Male Vocalist: Neil Finn
  - Dave Dobbyn
  - James Reid (The Feelers)
- Top Female Vocalist: Betty-Anne Monga (Ardijah)
  - Sulata Foai (Te Vaka)
  - Alesha Siosiua (Urban Pacifika)
- Top Group: The Feelers
  - Ardijah
  - Shihad
- Most Promising Male Vocalist: Andrew Tilby (Breathe)
  - King Kapisi
  - Nathan King (Zed)
- Most Promising Female Vocalist: Boh Runga (Stellar*)
  - Liz Faalogo (NV)
  - Sina Saipaia
- Most Promising Group: Stellar*
  - Breathe
  - Zed
- International Achievement: Bic Runga
  - Neill Finn
  - The Feelers
- Best Music Video: Reuben Sutherland Wait & See (Shihad)
  - Sima & Makerita Urale- Sub Cranium Feeling (King Kapisi)
  - Mark Tierney & Fiona Champtloup - Unlikely (NV)
- Best Producer: Malcolm Welsford & The Feelers - Supersystem
  - Eddie Raynor - ENZSO 2
  - Che Fu & Andy Morton - 2b Spacific (Che Fu)
- Best Engineer: Andy Morton - 2BS Pacific (Che Fu)
  - Sam Gibson - Try Whistling This (Neil Finn)
  - Malcolm Welsford - Supersystem (The Feelers)
- Best Jazz Album: Chris White / Aaron Nevezie Quartet - Take Me With You
  - Wil Sargisson - Steppin'Out
  - Rodger Fox Quartet - Back To Being One
- Best Classical Album: Alexander Ivashkin - Under The Southern Cross
  - Tamas Vesmas - Debussy, Bartok Piano Music
  - New Zealand String Quartet - Bartok The Six Quartets
- Best Country Album: Barry Saunders - Magnetic South
  - Glen Moffat - A Place To Play
  - Home Tonight - Coalrangers
- Best Folk Album: Windy City Strugglers - On Top of the World
  - Gallowglass - Sparven
  - Philip Riley & Jayne Elleson - The Blessing Tree
- Best Gospel Album: Parachute Band - Always & Forever
  - Debbie Harwood and Friends - Angels - The New Zealand Christmas Album
  - Steve Apirana - It's Inevitable
- Best Mana Maori Album: Moana and the Moahunters - Rua
  - Hori Chapman - Toku Reo
  - Waihirere Maori Club - Waihirere -National Champions
  - Ngati Rangiwewehi - Wairua -Spirit of Ngati Rangiwewehi
- Best Mana Reo Album: Traditional Waiata - He Waiata Onemata (Songs From the Past)
  - Ngati Rangiwewehi - Wairua -Spirit of Ngati Rangiwewehi
  - Moana & The Moahunters - Rua
  - Waihirere Maori Club - Waihirere National Champions
- Best Children's Album: Jennifer Moss - Jennifer's Garden
  - David LaPlance - A Hand Full of Songs
  - Universal Children's Audio - Kori Kori / Busi Bodies / Lue Lue Mai
  - Tessarose Productions - Dancing to the Beat Volume 2
- Best Songwriter: James Reid - Venus (The Feelers)
  - Dave Dobbyn - Beside You
  - Neil Finn - She Will Have Her Way
- Best Cover: Elroy Finn - Try Whistling This (Neil Finn)
  - Marcus Ringrose - Supersystem (The Feelers)
  - Mark Roach & Andrew Durno - HLAH IV: Are You Gonna Kiss It Or Shoot It? (HLAH)
- New Zealand Radio Programmer Award: Melanie Wise - Q92FM Queenstown
  - Tony Neilsen -Radio Otago Group
  - Jo Hampton - NRG FM
  - Robert Taylor - Radio Hauraki

See: 1999 in music

=== Performing arts ===
- Benny Award presented by the Variety Artists Club of New Zealand to Gerry Merito.

=== Radio and television ===
- The "bugger" advertising campaign for Toyota Hilux airs on New Zealand television for the first time.
- TVNZ sells its shareholding in SKY Network Television.

See: 1999 in New Zealand television, 1999 in television, List of TVNZ television programming, Category:Television in New Zealand, TV3 (New Zealand), Category:New Zealand television shows, Public broadcasting in New Zealand

=== Film ===
- Channelling Baby
- I'll Make You Happy
- Savage Honeymoon
- Scarfies

See: Category:1999 film awards, 1999 in film, List of New Zealand feature films, Cinema of New Zealand, Category:1999 films

=== Internet ===
See: NZ Internet History

== Sport ==
- See: 1999 in sports, Category:1999 in sports

=== Athletics ===
- Phil Costley wins his second national title in the men's marathon, clocking 2:17:43 on 24 October in Auckland, while Gabrielle O'Rourke claims her second as well in the women's championship (2:38:47).

=== Basketball ===
- Tall Blacks
- NBL (Men's) was won by the Auckland Stars

=== Cricket ===
Various Tours, New Zealand cricket team

- 1999 Cricket World Cup held in England: New Zealand finished third in its pool and fourth in the super-six round before being beaten by Pakistan in the first semifinal.
- The Shell Trophy for 1998-99 was won by Canterbury, with Northern Districts runners-up.

=== Golf ===
New Zealand Open Category:New Zealand golfers

=== Horse racing ===
==== Harness racing ====
- New Zealand Trotting Cup: Homin Hosed
- Auckland Trotting Cup: Happy Asset

=== Netball ===
- Silver Ferns
- National Bank Cup
- Netball World Championships

=== Rugby league ===
- The 1999 Tri Nations series was hosted by Auckland
- 1999 Auckland Warriors season
- Bartercard Cup
- New Zealand national rugby league team
- Rugby League World Cup

=== Rugby union ===
Category:Rugby union in New Zealand,

- Super 12
- Rugby World Cup
- National Provincial Championship
- Bledisloe Cup
- Tri Nations Series
- Ranfurly Shield

=== Shooting ===
- Ballinger Belt – Rick Fincham (Upper Hutt)

=== Soccer ===
- The Chatham Cup is won by Dunedin Technical who beat Waitakere City F.C. 4–0 in the final.

== Births ==
=== January–March ===
- 7 January – Scott Gregory, rugby union player
- 16 January – Michael Woud, association footballer
- 18 January
  - Ajeet Rai, tennis player
  - Malia Steinmetz, association footballer
- 20 January – Sarpreet Singh, association footballer
- 27 January – Kaleb Trask, rugby union player
- 19 February – Jacqui Hand, association footballer
- 23 February – Emily Shearman, cyclist
- 25 February – Nando Pijnaker, association footballer
- 6 March – Mawene Hiroti, rugby league player
- 12 March – Murray Taulagi, rugby league player
- 23 March – Danny Toala, rugby union player
- 29 March – Caleb Clarke, rugby union player

=== April–June ===
- 3 April – Chanel Harris-Tavita, rugby league player
- 4 April – Lwamba Chileshe, squash player
- 10 April – Grace Jale, association footballer
- 15 April – Dalton Wilkins, association footballer
- 19 April – Connor Garden-Bachop, rugby union player
- 22 April – Finn Allen, cricketer
- 27 April – Joe Bell, association footballer
- 30 April
  - Callum McCowatt, association footballer
  - Dallas McLeod, rugby union player
- 10 May – Quinn Tupaea, rugby union player
- 13 May – Alex Greive, association footballer
- 14 May
  - Miguel Porteous, freestyle skier
  - Billy Proctor, rugby union player
- 8 June – Dane Ingham, association footballer
- 13 June – Maddi Wesche, shot putter
- 29 June – Madison Doar, field hockey player

=== July–September ===
- 2 July – Hayze Perham, rugby league player
- 4 July – Lewis Clareburt, swimmer
- 10 July – Naitoa Ah Kuoi, rugby union player
- 20 July – Devan Flanders, rugby union player
- 7 August – Emmerson Houghton, water polo player
- 13 August – Ezi Magbegor, basketball player
- 20 August
  - Oregon Kaufusi, rugby league player
  - Etene Nanai-Seturo, rugby union player
- 3 September – Fergus Burke, rugby union player
- 21 September
  - Claudia Bunge, association footballer
  - Katene Clarke, cricketer
- 22 September – Finn Bilous, freestyle skier
- 27 September – Lucky Owners, Thoroughbred racehorse

=== October–December ===
- 7 October – Kate Heffernan, cricketer
- 11 October – Leicester Fainga'anuku, rugby union player
- 17 October – Gabrielle Fa'amausili, swimmer
- 28 October – Campbell Pithie, cyclist
- 30 October – Caleb Muntz, rugby union player
- 9 November
  - Tiarn Collins, snowboarder
  - St Reims, Thoroughbred racehorse
- 10 November – Matthew Fisher, cricketer
- 16 November
  - Bella Armstrong, cricketer
  - Moeaki Fotuaika, rugby league player
- 17 November – Ronaldo Mulitalo, rugby league player
- 18 November – Rachin Ravindra, cricketer
- 29 November – Bobbi Gichard, swimmer
- 5 December – William Stedman, athlete
- 12 December – Jakob Bhula, cricketer
- 19 December – Elsu, Standardbred racehorse
- 20 December – Cullen Grace, rugby union player
- 30 December
  - George Congreve, speedway rider
  - Hazel Ouwehand, swimmer
- 31 December
  - Ellesse Andrews, racing cyclist
  - Reid Walker, actor

=== Undated ===
- Keegan Smith, association footballer
- Grace Stratton, blogger, fashion entrepreneur
- Riiki Reid, singer-songwriter, producer and dance choreographer

== Deaths ==
=== January–March ===
- 5 January – Michael Hirschfeld, businessman, politician (born 1944)
- 17 January – Alister Hopkinson, rugby union player and coach (born 1941)
- 20 January – Martyn Finlay, politician (born 1912)
- 16 February – Don Hayward, rugby union and rugby league player (born 1925)
- 8 March – Barney Clarke, boxer (born 1927)
- 19 March – Freda Stark, dancer (born 1910)
- 28 March – Doody Townley, harness-racing driver (born 1925)

=== April–June ===
- 13 April – Ortvin Sarapu, chess player (born 1924)
- 19 April – Doug Dillon, jurist (born 1924)
- 28 April – Harold Wellman, geologist (born 1909)
- 29 April – Barbara Bevege, cricketer (born 1942)
- 30 April – Bruce Jesson, journalist, republican activist, politician (born 1944)
- 9 May – Jeff Whittington, murder victim (born 1985)
- 12 May – Dan Walls, theoretical physics academic (born 1942)
- 17 May – Chris Corne, linguist (born 1942)
- 21 May – Yvonne Lawley, actor (born 1913)
- 22 May – Maxwell Fernie, organist, music teacher and conductor (born 1910)
- 8 June – Brian Shorland, organic chemist (born 1909)
- 10 June – SIr Leonard Thornton, army officer (born 1916)
- 12 June – Gerry Clark, sailer, writer, ornithologist (born 1927)
- 25 June – Bill Rapson, chemist (born 1912)

=== July–September ===
- 5 July –
  - Keith Bagley, rugby union player (born 1931)
  - Len Butterfield, cricketer (born 1913)
- 22 July – Syd Jensen, motorcycle racer, motor racing driver (born 1922)
- 24 July – Rona McKenzie, cricketer (born 1922)
- 2 August – Charles Rappolt, politician (born 1939)
- 9 August – Les Riley, cricketer (born 1948)
- 10 August – Jens Hansen, jeweller (born 1940)
- 12 August – Wilfrid Kalaugher, athlete, cricketer, school teacher (born 1904)
- 23 August – Frank Tredrea, cyclist (born 1920)
- 24 August – Peter Mann, Anglican bishop (born 1924)
- 27 August – Don Crabb, association footballer (born 1910)
- 28 August – Muriel Hilton, politician, Mayor of Timaru (1959–1962) (born 1904)
- 31 August – Sylvia Potts, middle-distance athlete (born 1943)
- 1 September – Joe Genet, wrestler (born 1914)
- 5 September – Robert Arthur Owens, Mayor of Tauranga (born 1921)

=== October–December ===
- 5 October – Jack Somerville, Presbyterian leader (born 1910)
- 17 October – Ralph Grey, Baron Grey of Naunton, diplomat (born 1910)
- 22 October – Martin Donnelly, cricketer (born 1917)
- 25 October
  - Rosalie Gascoigne, sculptor (born 1917)
  - David Thomson, politician (born 1915)
- 2 November – Hardy Browning, potter, local politician (born 1915)
- 11 November – Bob Walls, artist (born 1927)
- 14 November – Garth Harris, taxation law academic (born 1942)
- 25 November – Sua Sulu'ape Paulo II, Samoan master tattooist (born c.1950)
- 1 December – Frank Newhook, plant pathology academic (born 1918)
- 6 December – Sheikh Khalid Hafiz, Muslim cleric (born 1938)
- 13 December – Peter Adams, actor (born 1938)

== See also ==
- List of years in New Zealand
- Timeline of New Zealand history
- History of New Zealand
- Military history of New Zealand
- Timeline of the New Zealand environment
- Timeline of New Zealand's links with Antarctica

For world events and topics in 1999 not specifically related to New Zealand see: 1999
