= Garden of Eden Ice Plateau =

Glacier in the Southern Alps, New Zealand

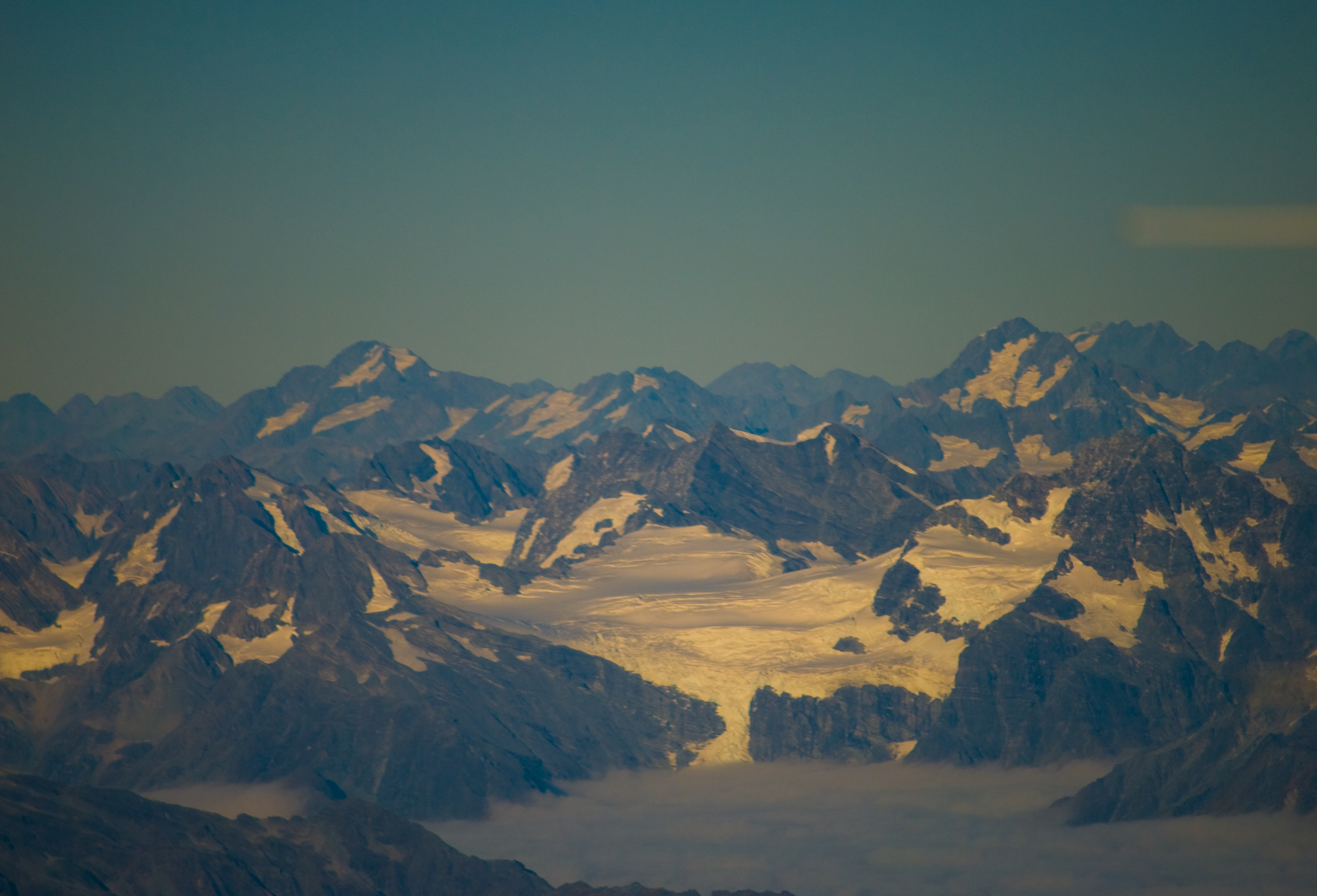
- Aerial view of the Garden of Eden Ice Plateau

- Location within New Zealand
- Type: Ice field
- Location: Adams Range, Southern Alps / Kā Tiritiri o te Moana
- Coordinates: 43°19′30″S 170°40′57″E
- Length: 9 km (5.6 mi)
- Width: 1 km (0.62 mi)
- Highest elevation: 2,300 m (7,500 ft)
- Lowest elevation: 1,800 m (5,900 ft)
- Status: Declining

The Garden of Eden Ice Plateau is a large ice field on the western side of New Zealand's Southern Alps / Kā Tiritiri o te Moana. At over 9 km (5.6 mi) long, the Garden of Eden is one of the largest ice fields in New Zealand, along with the equally-sized Garden of Allah Ice Field which sits just to the north. The ice field is one of many geographic features in the area between the main divide of the Southern Alps and the Adams Range which share biblical names, a convention first established by the earliest explorers to the area. The Garden's remote location and difficult conditions make research difficult, especially with restrictions on helicopter landings imposed through the designation of the area as Adams Wilderness Area in 2003. Despite this, the ice plateau has been a popular destination for tramping groups for over 80 years, with access routes from both coasts and easily reachable areas once on the plateau itself.

The ice plateau is part of a network of interconnected glaciers throughout the Adams Wilderness Area, with several distributary glaciers flowing downhill from the main ice field. These glaciers in turn feed the headwaters of several rivers in the South Island, including the Perth, Adams, Barlow, and Clyde.

== History and name ==
Records of exploration in the area date to the 1930s, when the mountaineer John Pascoe led expeditions to the area in search of unclimbed peaks within the Southern Alps. On a 1934 expedition with Allan Priestley Thomson and Gavin Malcolmson, the trio discovered the vast ice field and gave it its present name, along with other biblical names for some nearby features. These names were rejected by the New Zealand Geographic Board when originally proposed by Pascoe due to their biblical origins, with the Board preferring names rooted in classical mythology. Despite this, the names were routinely used and expanded upon by subsequent climbing parties, and had entered widespread use in the mountaineering community by the 1960s. After being resubmitted as part of a 1962 survey of New Zealand's glaciers, the names were eventually accepted as a result of their established usage, with the ridge separating the Gardens of Eden and Allah also being named after Pascoe.

In 1946, the plateau was traversed by Mavis Davidson after being rejected from a tramp in the Hopkins Valley because "there might be some climbing". Since then, the plateau has continued to be a popular destination for New Zealand trampers and mountaineers, due largely to its remoteness and relatively pristine environment. In order to preserve this environment, mountaineering groups such as the Federated Mountain Clubs proposed in 1981 for the area to receive legal protection through the establishment of a Wilderness Area. This imposes strict limitations on human use of the area in order to be able to experience the wilderness in an unaltered state, with wilderness areas unable to have "developments such as huts, tracks, bridges, signs, nor mechanised access". The FMC's campaign was a success, and in 2003 the 467 km^{2} (180 sq mi) Adams Wilderness Area was established, centred on the Gardens of Eden and Allah.

== Geography ==
Unlike most glaciers in New Zealand, the Garden of Eden is aligned east-west across both sides of the main divide of the Southern Alps / Kā Tiritiri o te Moana. The eastern reaches of the plateau are the highest point, reaching an altitude of around 2,300 m (7,500 ft) in the area south of Newton Peak. The plateau gradually descends in altitude as it moves to the west, reaching a low point along the main section of 1,810 m (5,940 ft) at Angel Col in the midpoint, before slowly climbing to around the 1,900 m (6,200 ft) mark for the western half of the plateau. A side passage to the north descends a further 200 m (660 ft) from Angel Col, connecting the Garden of Eden with the western reaches of the Garden of Allah Ice Field and the Beezlebub Glacier, along with the eastern side of the névé which feeds the Farrar Glacier, Barlow Glacier, and Arethusa Icefall.

On the southern side of the plateau, several small distributary glaciers descend down the steep rock face, feeding the upper reaches of the Perth River. In order from east to west, these are the Perth Glacier, Eve Icefall, Cain Glacier, Abel Glacier, and Serpent Glacier. The largest of these, Eve Icefall, has an area of 2.73 km^{2} (1.05 sq mi), while the Perth and Abel glaciers are each around 2.5 km^{2} (0.97 sq mi) and the remaining two much smaller. A further glacier, the Colin Campbell Glacier, flows eastward from the eastern end of the Garden of Eden and the southern side of the Garden of Allah to form the headwaters of the Frances River, a major tributary of the Rangitata River. At 3.95 km^{2} (1.53 sq mi), the Colin Campbell Glacier is the largest to flow from the Garden of Eden.

As with New Zealand's other glaciers, the Garden of Eden Ice Plateau is believed to be particularly susceptible to climate change and the impact of changes in marine temperature. However, the plateau's position across the divide of the Alps makes it much more prone to the orographic rainfall patterns from the prevailing westerly, with the area receiving an estimated 6,000–8,500 mm (236–335 in) of mean annual rainfall between 1972 and 2016. This has resulted in the ice plateau and its associated glaciers retreating, with the smaller glaciers linked to the plateau reducing noticeably in size between surveys.
