= Lord River (New Zealand) =

River in New Zealand

- Location within New Zealand

Location
- Country: New Zealand
- Region: West Coast
- District: Westland

Physical characteristics
- Source: Lord Glacier
  - coordinates: 43°14′59″S 170°51′13″E
  - elevation: 670 metres (2,198 ft)
- Mouth: Lambert River
  - coordinates: 43°15′49″S 170°46′18″E
  - elevation: 1,320 metres (4,331 ft)
- Length: 7 kilometres (4 mi)

Basin features
- Progression: Lord River → Lambert River → Wanganui River
- River system: Wanganui River

The Lord River is a river in the West Coast Region of New Zealand's South Island. It flows north from the Lord Glacier in the Southern Alps, joining with the Lambert River 20 kilometres (12 mi) southeast of Harihari.

== See also ==
- List of rivers of New Zealand
