= Wildlife management area =

Type of wildlife conservation area

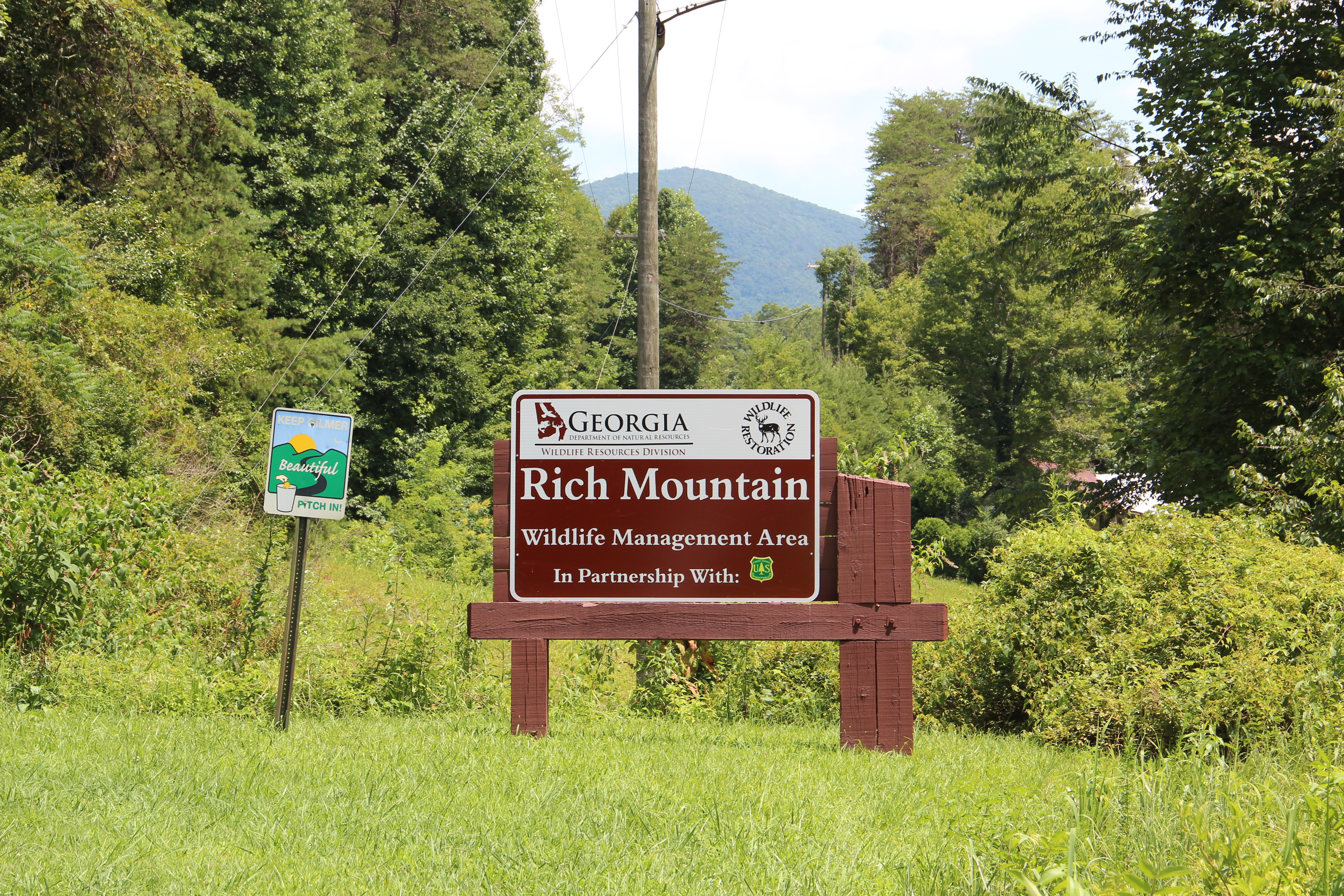
Sign to the Rich Mountain Wildlife Management Area in Georgia

A wildlife management area (WMA) is a protected area set aside for the conservation of wildlife and for recreational activities involving wildlife.

== New Zealand ==
There are 11 wildlife management areas in New Zealand:

- Horsham Downs Wildlife Management Reserves, Waikato
- Waihi Estuary Wildlife Management Reserve, Bay of Plenty
- Lake Waiau Wildlife Management Reserve, Manawatū-Whanganui
- Koitiata Wildlife Management Reserve, Manawatū-Whanganui
- Fletcher Creek Wildlife Management Area, West Coast
- Te Wharau Wildlife Management Area, West Coast
- Granville Wildlife Management Area, West Coast
- Hochstetter Wildlife Management Area, West Coast
- Wanganui River Flat Wildlife Management Area, West Coast
- Oneone Wildlife Management Area, West Coast
- Pye Creek Wildlife Management Area, West Coast

== Papua New Guinea ==
In Papua New Guinea a Wildlife Management Area is the simplest form of protected area. A WMA designation protects an area of land or water while retaining full power to landowners to manage their land. WMAs are managed by an elected committee formed of customary landowners.

The current Wildlife Management Areas are:

- Tonda Wildlife Management Area, Western Province
- Crater Mountain Wildlife Management Area, Eastern Highlands Province
- Kamiali Wildlife Management Area, Morobe Province
- Lake Kutubu Wildlife Management Area, Southern Highlands Province
- Oi Mada Wara Wildlife Management Area, Goodenough Island, Milne Bay Province
- Sulamesi Wildlife Management Area, Mount Bosavi, Southern Highlands Province
- Maza Wildlife Management Area, Western Province
- Aramba Wildlife Management Area, Western Province
- Wereaver Wildlife Management Area, Western Province
- Libano-Arisai Wildlife Management Area, Mount Bosavi, Southern Highlands Province
- Libano-Hose Wildlife Management Area, Mount Bosavi, Southern Highlands Province
- Neiru (Aird Hills) Wildlife Management Area, Gulf Province

== Tanzania ==
The Community Wildlife Management Areas Consortium (CWMAC) is an umbrella organization for all other organizations in Tanzania. As of 2016 there are 22 WMAs that have received "Authorized Association" (AA) status out of a total of 38 that have been established or gazetted. WMAs include:

- Burunge - Juhibu Wildlife Management Area: Established in 2003 the 617 square kilometres (238 sq mi) is in the Babati District.
- Chingoli Wildlife Management Area: Gazetted 2012 it is part of the Selous-Niassa Wildlife Corridor. The 47 square kilometres (18 sq mi) Selous Game Reserve of Tanzania, a UNESCO World Heritage-Site and the 42.4 square kilometres (16.4 sq mi) of Mozambique.
- Enduimet Wildlife Management Area: Established in 2003 the 1,282 square kilometres (495 sq mi) WMA is in the Longido District in the Olmolog and Tinga wards in the Western part of the Kilimanjaro Basin. The WMA borders the Kilimanjaro National Park on the South-East, the Tanzania-Kenya political boundary on the north, and the Ngasurai Open Area on the west. Kilimanjaro is approximately 20 square kilometres (7.7 sq mi) west of the WMA center.
- Iluma Wildlife Management Area: The WMA is located in Kilombero and Ulanga districts of the Morogoro Region in Eastern Tanzania. It is part of Selous ecosystem as well as the Kilombero Valley Ramsar site. The area borders Selous Game Reserve to the East. Most of the district area lies along the Kilombero River valley and part of it in the Rufiji Basin and Selous Game Reserve which extends to the Udzungwa Mountains National Park.
- Kimbanda Wildlife Management Area
- Kisungule Wildlife Management Area
- Mbomip - Pawaga-Idodi Wildlife Management Area
- Randileni Wildlife Management Area

== United States ==
In the United States, WMAs exist in these states:

- Alabama
- Alaska
- Arkansas
- California
- Colorado
- Connecticut
- Florida
- Georgia
- Idaho
- List of Indiana fish and wildlife areas
- Iowa
- Kansas
- Kentucky
- Louisiana
- Maine
- Massachusetts
- Maryland
- List of Michigan state game and wildlife areas
- Minnesota
- Mississippi
- Missouri
- Montana
- Nebraska
- New Jersey
- New Mexico
- Nevada
- New Hampshire
- New York
- North Dakota
- Oklahoma
- Oregon
- Pennsylvania
- Rhode Island
- South Carolina
- Tennessee
- Texas
- Utah
- Vermont
- Virginia
- West Virginia
- Illinois
