= Butler Range (West Coast) =

Mountain range in West Coast, New Zealand

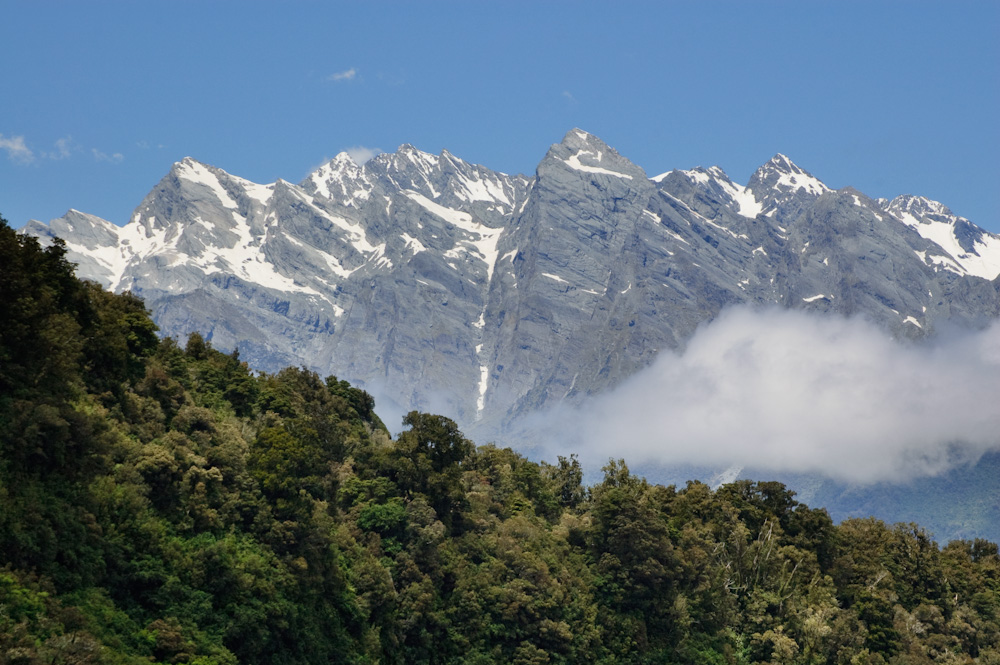
- Butler Range some distance upstream from State Highway 6

Highest point
- Peak: Mount Ariki
- Elevation: 2,193 m (7,195 ft)

Geography
- Location within New Zealand
- Country: New Zealand
- Region: West Coast
- Range coordinates: 43°23′31″S 170°29′02″E

The Butler Range, also known as North Butler Range, is a range located in the Westland District of the West Coast Region on the South Island of New Zealand. The range has also been known as Peaks of the Mist Range.

The Butler Range was probably named by Charlie Douglas in the late 1890s after John Butler of Whataroa. Due to its isolation, some of its peaks had their first ascents as late as the 1940s. Named peaks of the Butler Range, from west to east, are Bamford Knob (1,845 metres or 6,053 feet), Tohunga Peak (1,926 metres or 6,319 feet), Mount Whataroa (2,123 metres or 6,965 feet; first ascended 1949), Mount Rangatira (2,157 metres or 7,077 feet), and Mount Ariki (2,193 metres or 7,195 feet; first ascended 1949). The range can be seen from State Highway 6 from where it crosses the Whataroa River.

Geographic features south of the Butler Range are Whataroa Glacier, Ice Lake, and the Butler River. The latter flows into the Whataroa River, which flows past Whataroa into the Tasman Sea. On its northern side, Butler Range is bounded by the Perth River.

Some mountaineers call the range south of the Butler River extending from King Peak to Mount Huss (located on the Main Divide) the South Butler Range; Mount Barrowman and Dog Kennel Peak are the two named intermediate peaks. To avoid confusion, Butler Range is thus sometimes referred to as North Butler Range.
