= Willberg River =

River in New Zealand

Coordinates: 43°15′S 170°35′E

Location
- Country: New Zealand

Physical characteristics
- Mouth
  - location: Poerua River
- Length: 8 km (5.0 mi)

The Willberg River (also spelt Wilberg River) is a river of the West Coast Region of New Zealand's South Island. It initially flows northwest before turning southwest, reaching the Poerua River 12 kilometres south of Harihari.

== See also ==
- List of rivers of New Zealand
