= Lambert River =

River in New Zealand

Coordinates: 43°14′S 170°45′E

Location
- Country: New Zealand

Physical characteristics
- Source
  - location: Lambert Glacier
- Mouth
  - location: Wanganui River
- Length: 8 km (5.0 mi)

Basin features
- Tributaries
  - right: Lord River

The Lambert River is a river of the West Coast Region of New Zealand's South Island. It flows north from the Lambert Glacier in the Southern Alps, joining with the Wanganui River 15 kilometres (9 mi) southeast of Harihari.

== See also ==
- List of rivers of New Zealand
