= Mount Adams (New Zealand) =

Mountain in West Coast Region, New Zealand

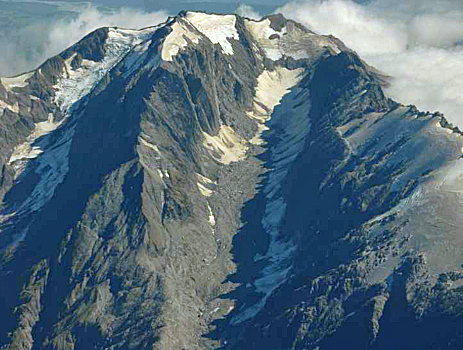
- Mount Adams from the south-east, Escape Glacier at left, Siege Glacier (partially covered in rock debris) at centre. Late summer conditions.

Highest point
- Elevation: 2,208 m (7,244 ft)
- Prominence: 754 m (2,474 ft)
- Coordinates: 43°06′02″S 170°31′40″E

Geography
- Location within New Zealand
- Location: South Island, New Zealand
- Parent range: Southern Alps
- Topo map(s): Topo50 BW17 – Harihari; NZMS 260: I35 Whataroa

Climbing
- Easiest route: New Zealand Alpine Grade 1

Mount Adams is a mountain in the West Coast region of New Zealand's South Island. The summit is roughly 19 km south of Harihari and reaches 2,208 metres (7,244 ft) in height.

Mount Adams lies to the west of the main divide of the Southern Alps and drains into the Whataroa and Poerua catchments. Both of these rivers flow westwards to the Tasman Sea. There are two small glaciers on the south-eastern slopes that drain the summit ice cap; the Escape Glacier (about 2.1 km in length) and the Siege Glacier (about 3.6 km).

== Climate ==
This area, like much of the West Coast region, is subject to high precipitation by world standards. There are no rainfall gauges on Mount Adams, but a gauge in Whataroa valley at the State Highway 6 bridge 10 km south-west of the summit at 60 metres above sea level, records a mean annual rainfall of 5,690 mm (224 in) and daily falls of up to 320 mm (13 in). It is likely that the precipitation at higher elevations on Mount Adams will be significantly greater than this, and a rain gauge in the Cropp River 42 km north-east of Mount Adams at 860 metres above sea level, records a mean annual rainfall of 10,690 mm (421 in) and daily falls of up to 695 mm (27.4 in).

== Geology ==
The Alpine Fault runs across the lower North-western slopes of the mountain near the edge of the coastal outwash plain, and is the boundary between the Pacific and Indo-Australian tectonic plates. Mount Adams itself is composed primarily of schist of Permian–Triassic (depositional) age, which is increasingly metamorphosed closer to the Alpine Fault.

On 6 October 1999, a large rock landslide originating near the northern summit of Mount Adams deposited c.10–15 million cubic metres of rock in the Poerua River 1,790 metres (5,870 ft) below. This created a 120-metre (390-foot) high landslide dam, which formed a lake that extended 1.2 kilometres upstream. The dam failed six days later during heavy rain. Fears of major damage did not turn into reality when the dam was breached, though significant quantities of coarse gravel were deposited downstream and the river's path was changed in places.

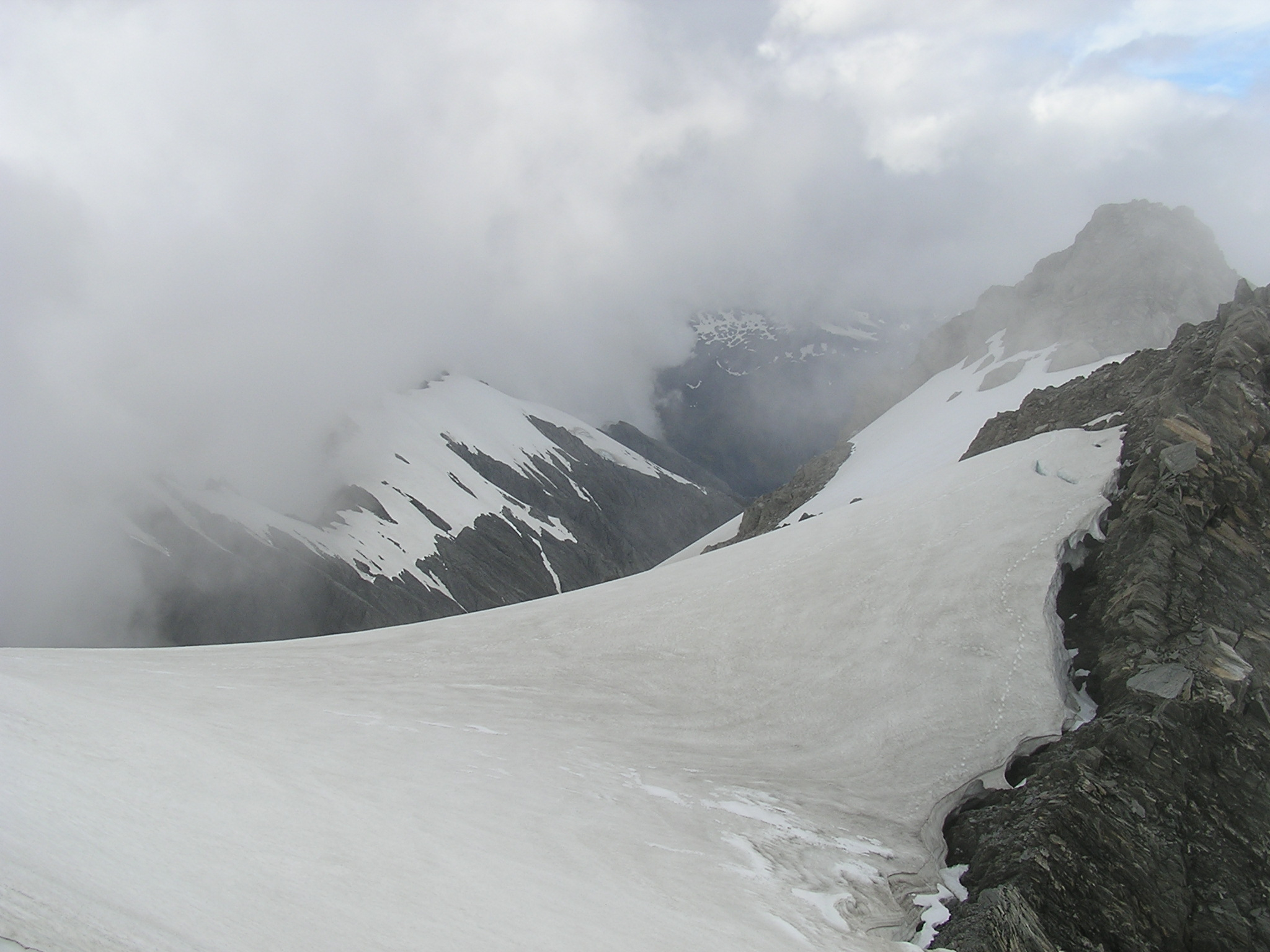
Summit of Mt Adams (at right) from point 2194 m. Siege Glacier at centre and left. Late summer conditions.

== Access ==
Mount Adams is unique in that it is one of the only glaciated peaks situated on or to the west of the main divide that is accessible as a weekend trip from a west coast road end. The standard route to the summit starts from a hidden layby off SH6 and heads up Dry Creek/Little Man River to a steep spur where a marked route starts. The marked route ends at the bushline and the remainder of the climb is on tussock, rock, and eventually the summit ice cap glacier.

Although this route is technically not difficult, it involves multiple river crossings, off track travel up Dry Creek/Little Man River and above the bushline, and glacial travel requiring an ice axe and crampons. The overall elevation gain, from highway to summit, is approximately 2,100 metres (6,900 ft). Most parties take two days to summit and return to SH6, though it is possible in a long summer day.
