= Oneone River =

River in New Zealand

Coordinates: 43.041008°S 170.423304°E

Location
- Country: New Zealand

Physical characteristics
- Mouth
  - location: Wanganui River mouth
- Length: 6 km (3.7 mi)

The Oneone River is a short river of the West Coast Region of New Zealand's South Island. It is located northwest of Harihari, and reaches the Tasman Sea at the estuary of its larger northern neighbour, the Wanganui River.

The New Zealand Ministry for Culture and Heritage gives a translation of "earth" for Oneone.

== See also ==
- List of rivers of New Zealand
