= Adams River (New Zealand) =

River in New Zealand

- Route of the Adams River
- Mouth of the Adams River Adams River (New Zealand) (South Island)

Location
- Country: New Zealand
- Region: West Coast Region
- District: Westland District

Physical characteristics
- Source: Beelzebub Glacier
  - location: Southern Alps / Kā Tiritiri o te Moana
  - coordinates: 43.30448°S 170.6879°E
  - elevation: 1,620 metres (5,310 ft)
- Mouth: Lambert River
  - location: Jones Flat
  - coordinates: 43°14′S 170°45′E
  - elevation: 215 metres (705 ft)
- Length: 12 km (7 mi)

Basin features
- Progression: Beelzebub Glacier → Adams River → Lambert River → Wanganui River
- River system: Wanganui River
- Tributaries
  - left: Adams Glacier, Alpheus Creek, Athene Creek
  - right: Aciphylla Creek

The Adams River is in the South Island of New Zealand. The headwaters are on the western side of the Southern Alps / Kā Tiritiri o te Moana. It flows into the Lambert River just before its confluence with the Wanganui River.
