= Hinatua River =

River of New Zealand

- Route of the Hinatua River
- Mouth of the Hinatua River Hinatua River (New Zealand)

Location
- Country: New Zealand
- Region: West Coast
- District: Westland

Physical characteristics
- Source
  - coordinates: 43.1607°S 170.4680°E
- Mouth: Tasman Sea
  - coordinates: 43°04′02″S 170°23′13″E
  - elevation: 0 m (0 ft)

Basin features
- Progression: Hinatua River → Tasman Sea

The Hinatua River is a small river in the Westland District of New Zealand's South Island. Its headwaters are on Mount Hercules, near State Highway 6 as it runs between Harihari and Te Taho. The Hinatua River then flows in a general northerly direction, passing just to the east of the Saltwater Lagoon before flowing close to the Tasman Sea coastline before joining the Poerua River at its rivermouth.
