= Butler Range =

Butler Range may refer to:

- Butler Range (Canada), British Columbia, Canada
- Butler Range (Canterbury), South Island, New Zealand
- Butler Range (West Coast), South Island, New Zealand
