= Berth (moorings) =

Designated location in a port or harbour used for mooring vessels

A berth is a designated location in a port or harbour used for mooring vessels when they are not at sea. Berths provide a vertical front which allows safe and secure mooring that can then facilitate the unloading or loading of cargo or people from vessels.

== Locations in a port ==
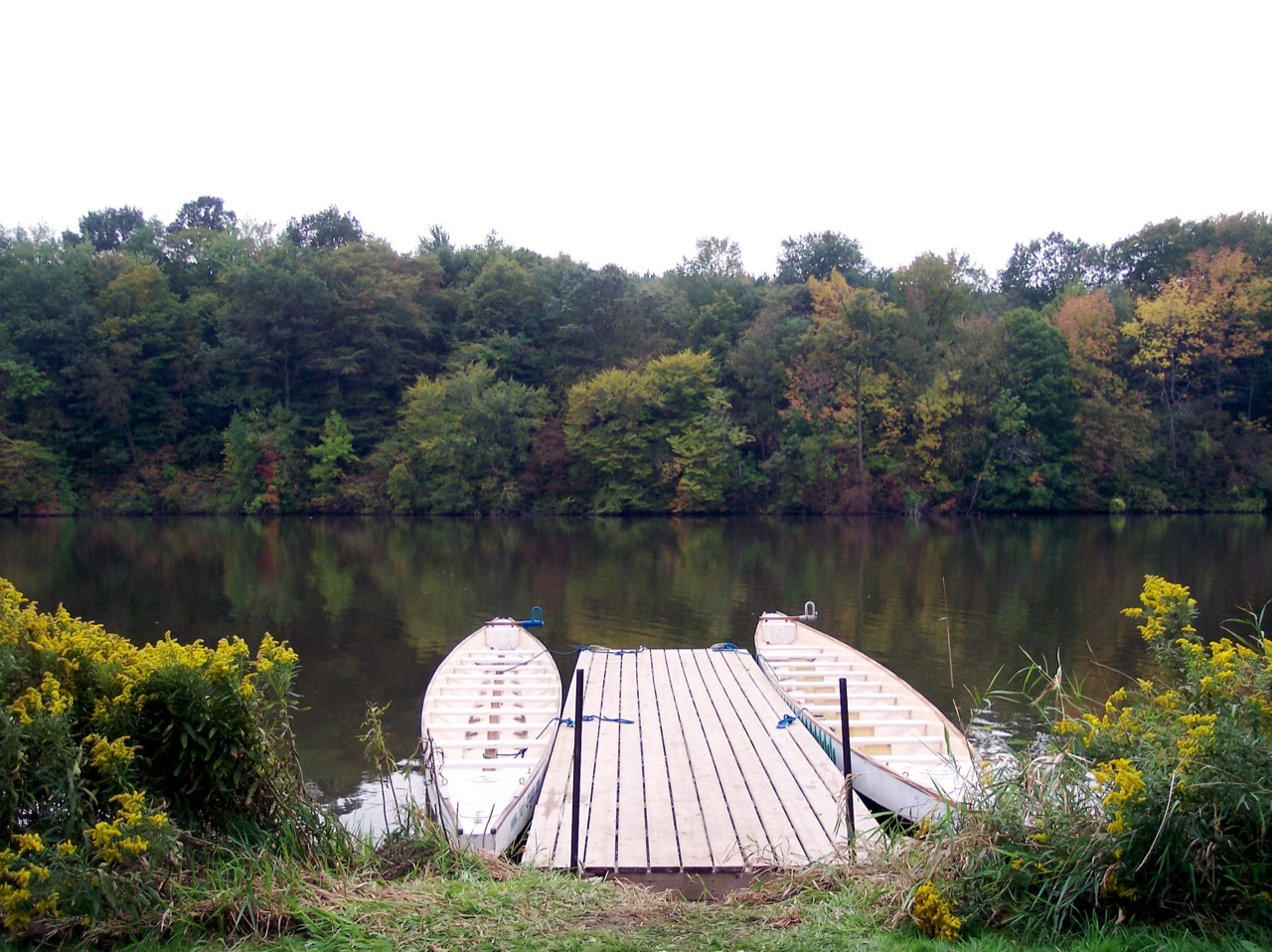
Two small marina-type berths

Berth is the term used in ports and harbors for a designated location where a vessel may be moored, usually for the purposes of loading and unloading. Berths are designated by the management of a facility (e.g., port authority, harbor master). Vessels are assigned to berths by these authorities.

Most berths are alongside a quay or a jetty (large ports) or a floating dock (small harbors and marinas). Berths are either general or specific to the types of vessel that use them. The size of the berths varies from 5–10 m (16–33 ft) for a small boat in a marina to over 400 m (1,300 ft) for the largest tankers. The rule of thumb is that the length of a berth should be roughly 10% longer than the longest vessel to be moored at the berth.

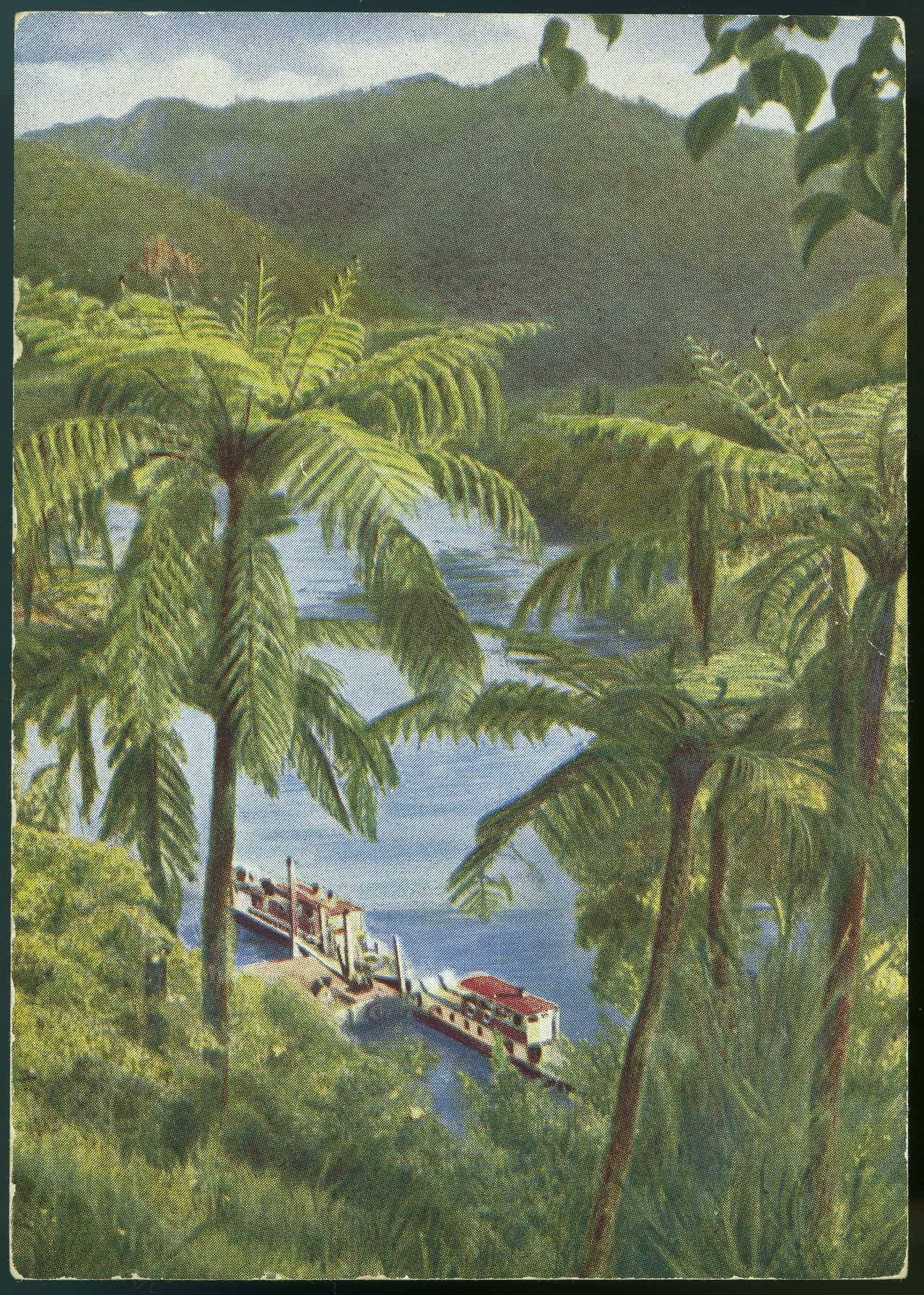
Berth in Pipiriki, Wanganui River, New Zealand. Postcard from the 1930s

== Berth types ==
=== By construction ===
The following is a list of berth types based on the method of construction:

Solid structure berth
In these berths, a solid vertical structure is created to contain fill material which is brought all the way to the structure. They can be constructed using either a gravity wall structure where the front wall of the structure uses its own weight and friction to contain the fill or with a sheet pile structure where an anchoring plate is used to contain the weight of the fill dirt.
Open structure berth
Open berths feature structures supported by piles set slightly off shore from the natural extent of the land or the furthest extent of fill dirt. This style of berth can offer higher flexibility in the specificity of construction, but it also presents more complicated dredging projects afterwards and limits the amount of weight the berth is able to support and resist.

=== By shore connection ===
Berths can be classified by whether they are attached to the shore:

Finger pier
Used to maximize the berthing space per length of waterfront. Finger piers are often used for small to medium vessels associated with passenger travel. Finger piers can also be used for dangerous cargoes such as military cargo that cannot be used with offshore berths due to weight and equipment requirements. In these instances, long finger piers may reach far offshore, with access for rail or other cargo-moving methods.
Offshore berth
Used when cargo-handling or storage can be hazardous. Offshore berths are often created for berthing of oil and gas vessels. They contain standalone structures called dolphins which have fenders and bollards located to fit the geometry of the vessels that would call at the berth.

=== By cargo ===
The following is a list of berth types based on cargo of the ships calling:

Bulk berth
Used to handle either dry or liquid bulk cargo. Vessels are loaded using either excavators, conveyor belts, and/or pipelines. Storage facilities for the bulk cargo are often alongside the berth – e.g. silos or stockpiles.
Container berth
Used to handle standard intermodal containers. Vessels are loaded and unloaded by container cranes, designed specifically for the task. These berths will feature large areas of land for container handling near the berth and will also have significant equipment on dock to facilitate rapid movement of containers on and off the vessels. Alongside the quay, there is often a large flat area used to store both the imported and exported containers.
General berth
Used to handle smaller shipments of general cargo. Vessels using these would usually have their own lifting gear, but some ports will provide mobile cranes to do this. These are common at smaller ports or ports where special project cargo is prevalent.
Lay berth (Layberth)
A berth used for idle (lay-up status) vessels. Vessels being put on the hook can use these as intermediate points between operational use and mothballing at an off shore mooring. These berths will feature very little land side access or equipment except what is needed to secure the vessel.
Lay-by berth
A general berth for use by vessels for short term waiting until a loading or discharging berth is available. These berths can feature very basic amenities for fuel, provisions, and utilities to sustain a crew and vessel until the destination berth is available.
Liquid berth
Used to handle oil and gas related products. Berths are placed offshore to keep safe zone of operation from rest of port operations. Vessels are loaded via loading arms containing the pipe lines. Cargo is then pumped back on shore through pipelines, which are usually submerged. Storage facilities for the products are typically some distance away from the berth and connected by these pipelines.
Marina berth
Used to allow the owners of leisure craft on and off their boats. Generally alongside pontoons and accessed by hinged bridges (in tidal locations) to the shore. Marina berths are often built with modular capabilities to adjust the berth size for various shapes and sizes of recreational craft. Specialized equipment for keeping boats out of the water is also a common feature. This allows the vessel to be removed from the negative effects of wave action on the hull and helps prevent organic growth on the hull.
X and Z berths
Suitable for nuclear-powered warships, and part of an operational Naval base or a building and refitting yard. All X-berths have as an integral part of their safety arrangements a permanent health physics department, a local emergency monitoring organisation and a local safety plan prepared under the auspices of a local liaison committee.
