= Bass Brook =

Stream in Itasca County, Minnesota, U.S.

Coordinates: 47°15′44″N 93°37′09″W

Bass Brook is a stream in Itasca County, in the U.S. state of Minnesota. The Bass Brook wildlife management area is a 300-acre (120 ha) zone. The nearest city is Grand Rapids, Minnesota.

Bass Brook was named for its population of bass fish.

== See also ==
- List of rivers of Minnesota
