= Abut Head =

Headland in South Island, New Zealand

- Point
- Location within New Zealand
- Coordinates: 43.1103°S 170.2633°E
- Location: Westland District, New Zealand
- Water bodies: Tasman Sea, Whataroa River
- Elevation: 52 metres (171 ft)

Abut Head is a forested headland on the West Coast of New Zealand's South Island. It is located north of the village of Whataroa and west of Harihari, and is southwest of the Westland District's main centre, Hokitika. On the southern side of the headland, the Whataroa River meets the Tasman Sea. To the east is the Saltwater Lagoon.
