= Barlow River =

Barlow River may refer to:

- Barlow River (New Zealand), a tributary of the Perth River in the Westland district of the South Island of New Zealand
- Barlow River (Chibougamau River), a tributary of the Chibougamau River in Quebec, Canada
