= North Barlow River =

River in New Zealand

Coordinates: 43°18′S 170°32′E

Location
- Country: New Zealand

Physical characteristics
- Mouth
  - location: Barlow River

The North Barlow River is a river in the West Coast Region of New Zealand's South Island. It is one of the headwaters of the Barlow River.

== See also ==
- List of rivers of New Zealand
