= Poerua River (Westland District) =

River in New Zealand

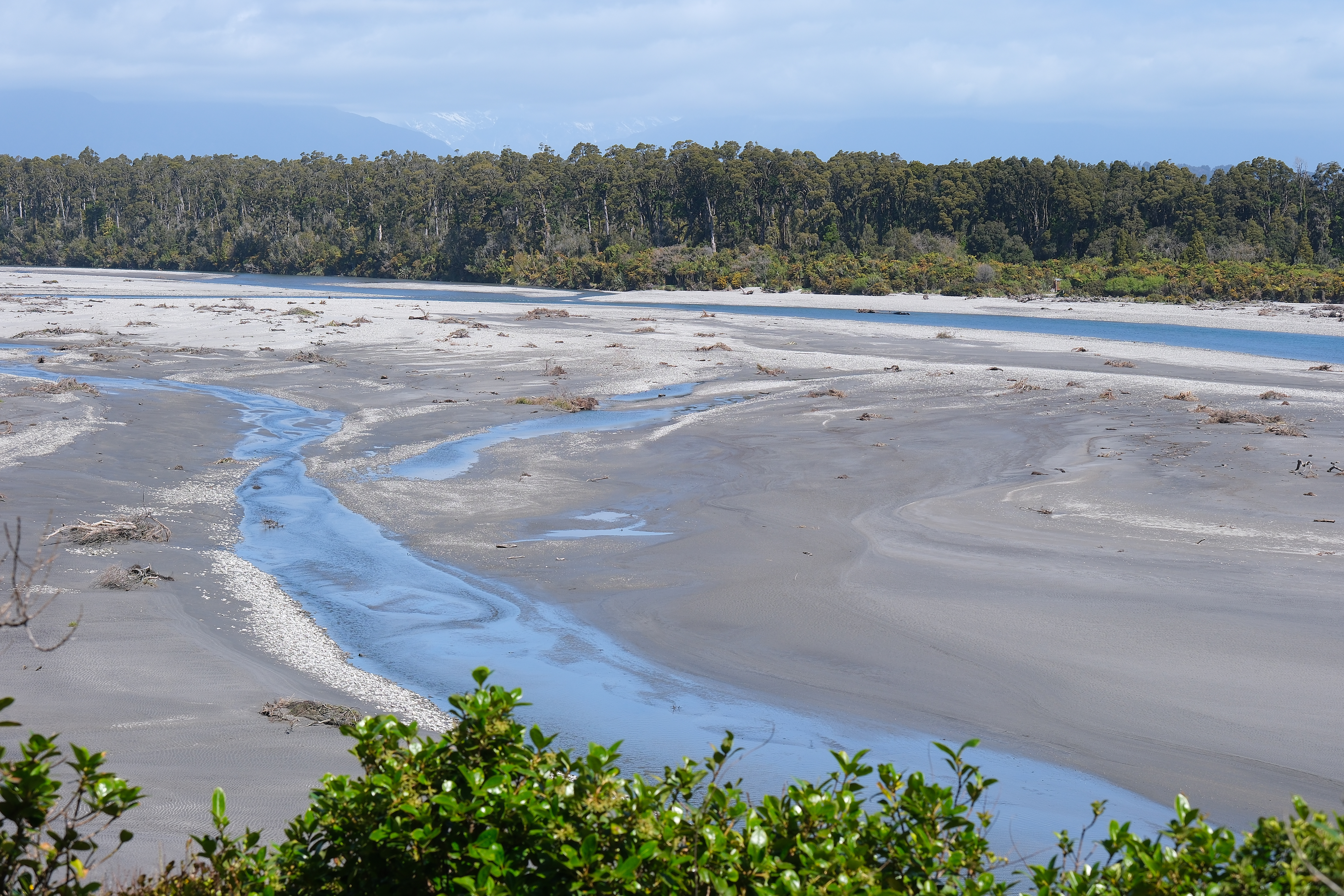
- Route of the Poerua River
- Mouth of the Poerua River Poerua River (Westland District) (South Island)
- Native name: Pouerua-tāhuna (Māori)

Location
- Country: New Zealand
- region: West Coast Region
- District: Westland District

Physical characteristics
- Source: Poerua Glacier
  - location: Southern Alps / Kā Tiritiri o te Moana
  - coordinates: 43.2852°S 170.6129°E
  - elevation: 1,380 m (4,530 ft)
- Mouth: Tasman Sea
  - location: Hikimutu Lagoon
  - coordinates: 43.0489°S 170.4101°E
  - elevation: 0 m (0 ft)
- Length: 35.4 km (22.0 mi)

Basin features
- Tributaries
  - left: McCullouchs Creek
  - right: Willberg River, Dry Creek, Ferguson Creek, Pye Creek

Poerua River is a river in Westland District in the West Coast region of New Zealand's South Island. It flows from its headwaters in the Southern Alps to the Tasman Sea near Harihari. The river is a trout and salmon fishing location and its mouth is where it is met by the Hinatua River and is located roughly a kilometre south of the Wanganui River's mouth. On the morning of 6 October 1999, a landslide from Mount Adams blocked the Poerua River, creating a landslide dam about 11 km upstream from the State Highway 6 bridge over the river. Despite fears of flooding and other damage, there were relatively minimal impacts when the dam was breached six days later, though significant quantities of coarse gravel were deposited downstream and the river's course was changed in places.
