= Gunn River =

River of New Zealand

Coordinates: 43°22′28″S 170°24′02″E

Location
- Country: New Zealand

Physical characteristics
- Source
  - location: Westland Tai Poutini National Park
- Mouth
  - location: Whataroa River

The Gunn River is a river on the West Coast of New Zealand. It starts in the Price Range and flows east into the Whataroa River, which eventually drains into the Tasman Sea.

== See also ==
- List of rivers of New Zealand
