= Saltwater Lagoon =

- Pouerua-hāpua
- Pouerua-hāpua (Māori)
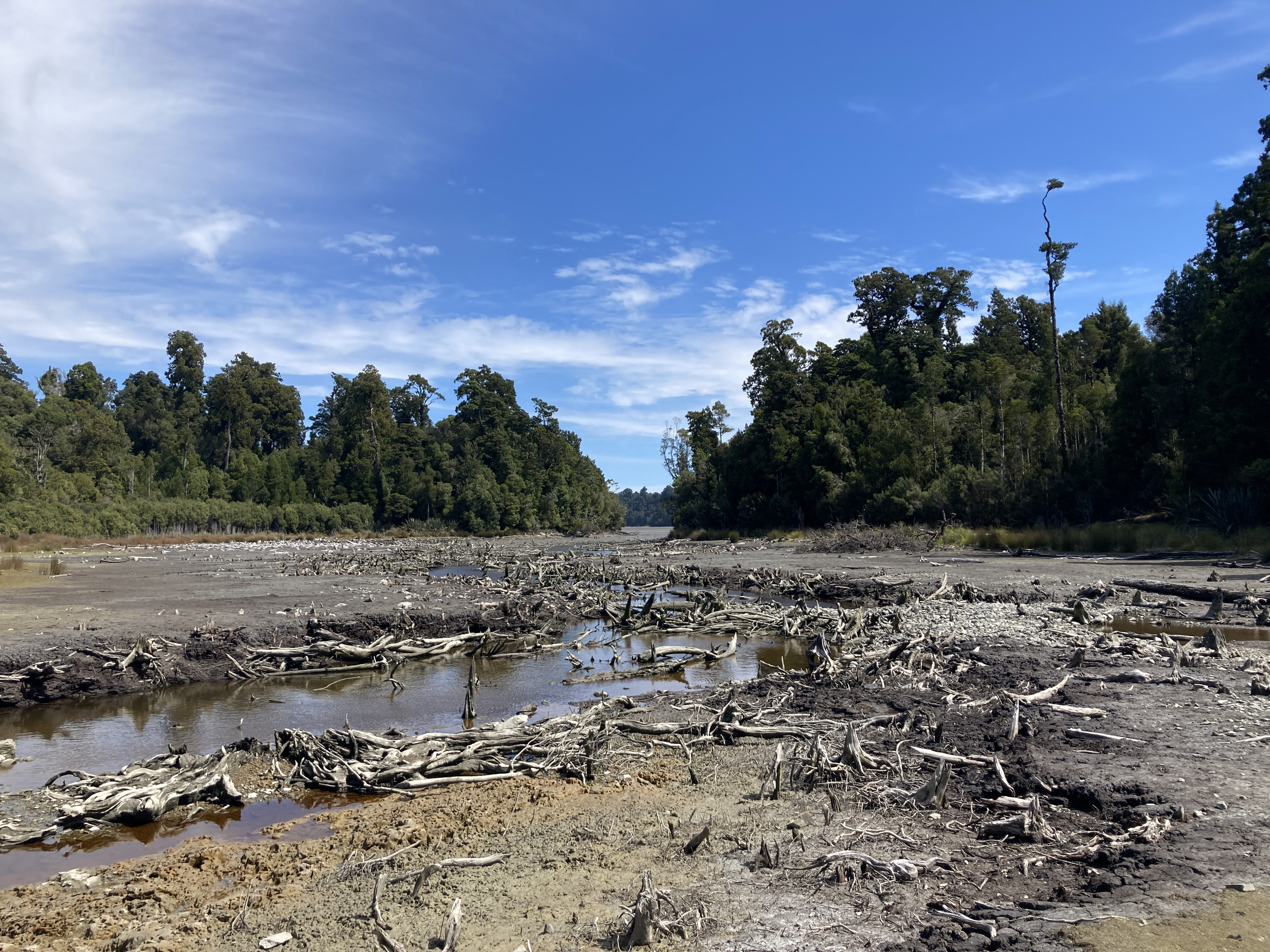
- Tunnel Bay, Saltwater Lagoon

- Location within New Zealand
- Interactive map of Saltwater Lagoon
- Location: West Coast, South Island, New Zealand
- Coordinates: 43°06′S 170°21′E
- Type: lagoon
- Primary outflows: Tasman Sea
- Sections/sub-basins: Shag Bay, Corbett Cove, Snark Bay, Swan Bay, Tunnel Bay

Saltwater Lagoon (Māori: Pouerua-hāpua) is a lagoon on the West Coast of New Zealand's South Island.

It is in the southern Westland District, with Abut Head to the west and the village of Harihari to the east/southeast. The lagoon is located on the coast of the Tasman Sea and has a narrow sea opening at the western end that lets in saltwater. No rivers feed into the lagoon, but the Hinatua River passes very close to the lagoon's eastern shore.
