= John Pascoe (mountaineer) =

New Zealand mountaineer, photographer, and Chief Archivist (1963–1972)

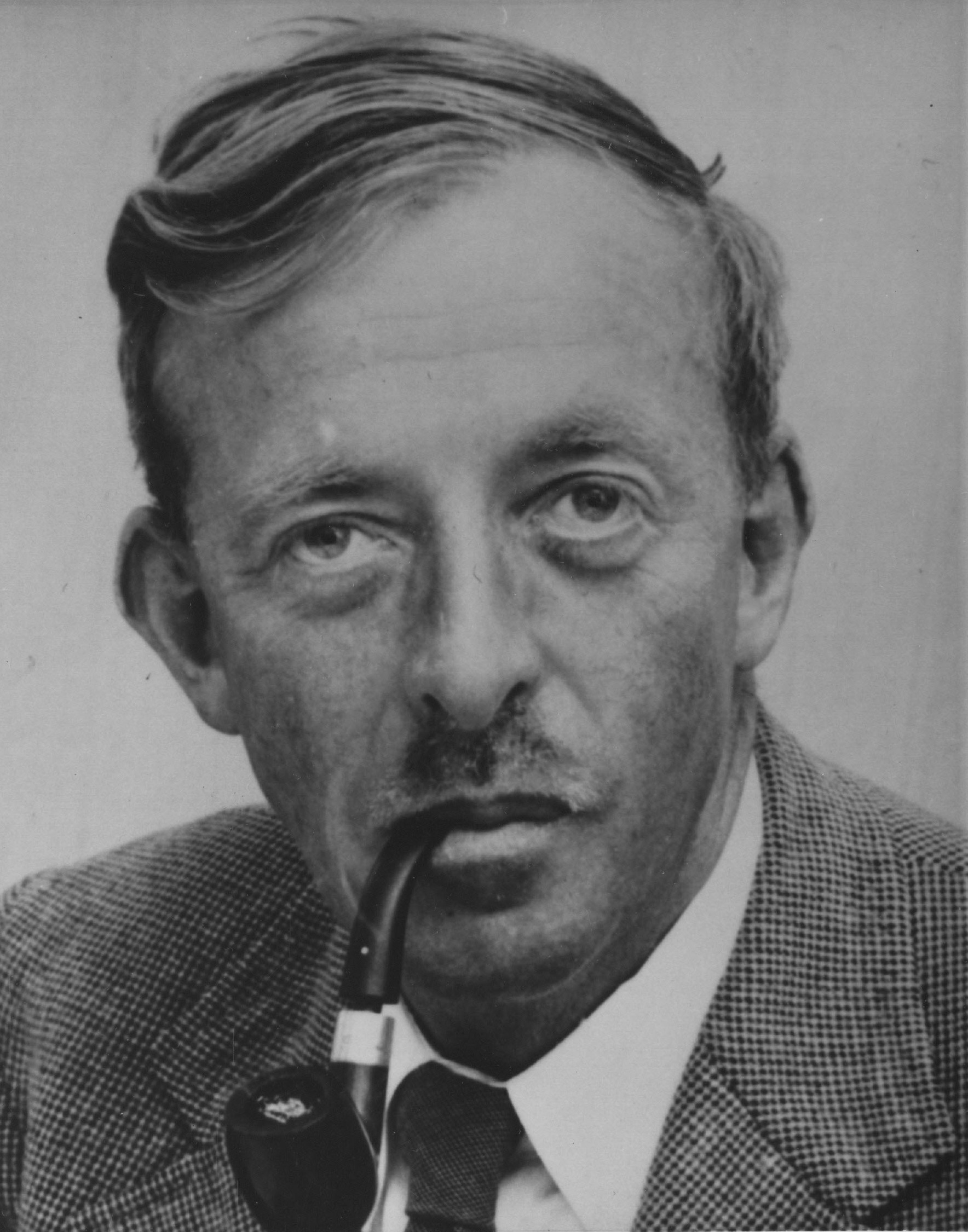
- Born: John Dobrée Pascoe; 26 September 1908; Christchurch, New Zealand
- Died: 20 October 1972 (aged 64); Christchurch, New Zealand

John Dobrée Pascoe (26 September 1908 – 20 October 1972) was a New Zealand mountaineer, photographer, writer, editor, historian and archivist.

== Early life ==
Pascoe was born in Christchurch, New Zealand in 1908. His twin brother was Paul, who would later become a notable architect. John Pascoe received his education at Sumner School and Christ's College. He joined his father's law firm and studied the subject, but did not graduate.

== Career ==
Pascoe was bored with legal work, so he enquired with Joe Heenan, the under-secretary for the Department of Internal Affairs, whether there were employment opportunities. Pascoe was put on a team working on the 1940 centennial publications, and he thus moved to Wellington.

Pascoe was appointed Official War Photographer in 1942. His photographs concentrated on social experiences of workers in wartime New Zealand; many became iconic representations of New Zealand's domestic experience of that war.

After the war, Pascoe was the founding secretary of the National Historic Places Trust in 1955. In 1960 he was controller of the Wildlife Branch. As National Archivist, he convinced the government statistician to keep the 1966 census forms for future research. Unlike most other countries, New Zealand had never kept its census forms, and upon Pascoe's initiative, the 1976 and 1986 forms were subsequently also kept and are in secure storage.

== Mountaineering ==
Pascoe climbed extensively throughout the South Island of New Zealand. It is claimed he summited over 100 peaks, of which some 23 were first ascents. For his work on New Zealand mountaineering, literature, mapping and photography, he was made a fellow of the Royal Geographical Society.

In 1934, Pascoe led an expedition to the Garden of Eden Ice Plateau, giving the plateau its name and establishing the convention of biblical names for features in that area. Pascoe's name for the plateau was originally rejected by the New Zealand Geographic Board for its biblical origins, with the Board suggesting that it be given a name derived from classical mythology instead.

Pascoe never climbed without his camera and notebook, records from which contributed to a stream of publications.

== Publications ==
Books written or edited by John Pascoe include:

- Unclimbed New Zealand, Allen & Unwin, 1939 (reprinted 1950, 1954)
- The Mountains, the Bush and the Sea, Whitcombe & Tombs, 1950 (2nd edition 1958)
- The Southern Alps (part 1) – from the Kaikouras to the Rangitata, Pegasus Press 1951 (revised edition 1956)
- Land Uplifted High, Whitcombe & Tombs, 1952 (2nd edition 1961)
- Mr Explorer Douglas, Reed, 1957 (initial editor) (reprinted 1957, 1969; revised edition by Graham Langton Canterbury University Press, 2000)
- Great Days in New Zealand Mountaineering, Reed, 1958
- Over the Whitcombe Pass by Jakob Lauper (editor) Whitcombe & Tombs, 1960.
- Great Days in New Zealand Exploration, Reed, 1959 (reprinted in paperback, 1976)
- National Parks of New Zealand, Government Printer, 1965 (2nd edition 1971, 3rd edition 1974)
- Oxford New Zealand Encyclopedia, edited with Laura Salt, Oxford University Press 1965
- The Haast is in South Westland, Reed, 1966 (reprinted, 1968)
- New Zealand from the Air – in Colour, Reed, 1968 (photographs by R. J. Griffiths)
- Of Unknown New Zealand, McIndoe, 1971
- Exploration New Zealand, Reed, 1971 (new edition as Explorers and Travellers, 1983.
- The Great Journey by Thomas Brunner, (editor).
