= Abel Lake =

- Location within New Zealand
- Location: South Island
- Coordinates: 43°20′28″S 170°38′18″E
- Type: Proglacial lake
- Primary inflows: Abel Glacier
- Basin countries: New Zealand
- Surface area: 6.6 hectares (16 acres)
- Surface elevation: 968 metres (3,176 ft)

Abel Lake was a small lake in the Westland region of the South Island of New Zealand. It was located in the Southern Alps, 35 kilometres (22 mi) east of Franz Josef and was fed by the Abel Glacier. A short stream linked the lake with the Perth River.

The lake was officially named in 1987, but no longer existed by 2009, having filled with gravel. Biblical in origin, the name was consistent with those of other features nearby, including Eve Icefall and Cain Glacier. The name 'Abel Lake' was officially discontinued by the New Zealand Geographic Board in 2026.
