= Clyde River (New Zealand) =

Coordinates: 43.4668°S 170.8502°E

Clyde River, New Zealand
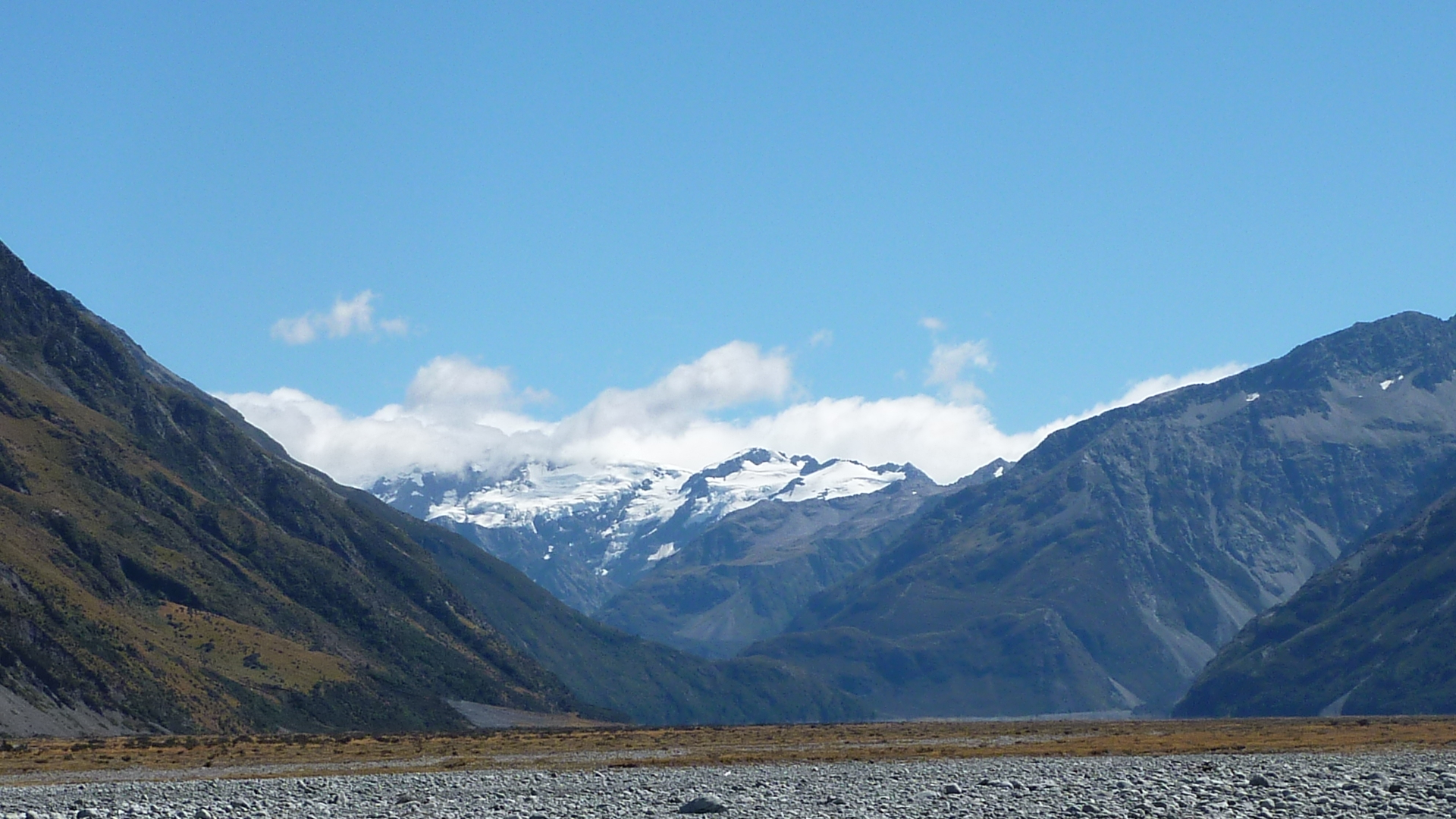
- Clyde River – looking towards Main Divide

Location
- Country: New Zealand

Physical characteristics
- Source
  - location: Frances River and McCoy Stream
- Mouth
  - location: Rangitata River
- Length: 18 km (11 mi)

The Clyde River is a river of New Zealand, one of Canterbury's braided rivers. It is formed from the confluence of the Frances River and McCoy Stream, flowing southwest to join with the Havelock River and Lawrence River to form the Rangitata River.

== See also ==
- List of rivers of New Zealand
