= Grace Stratton =

New Zealand blogger and fashion entrepreneur

Grace Stratton (born 1999) is a New Zealand blogger and fashion entrepreneur. In 2019 she received a New Zealand Youth Award for Innovation.

== Biography ==
Stratton was born in Auckland in 1999 with spastic diplegia cerebral palsy. She grew up in Warkworth, Northland, New Zealand.

In 2015 Stratton began writing a blog, and in 2017 she was nominated for the Young Leader award at the New Zealand Women of Influence Awards.

In 2017 Stratton launched All is for All, an accessible fashion online shopping platform focused on the needs of disabled people. The garments featured on the site are listed with detailed information about zips, buttons, fabric and lengths to make choosing clothes easier. Stratton also founded a modelling agency for models with accessibility needs.

In 2019 Stratton received a New Zealand Youth Award for Innovation. In the same year, she was named in InStyle magazine's list of 50 Badass Women. In August 2019 Stratton was a keynote speaker at the opening of New Zealand Fashion Week.
