= Barlow River (New Zealand) =

River in New Zealand

- Route of the Barlow River
- Mouth of the Barlow River Barlow River (New Zealand) (South Island)

Location
- Country: New Zealand
- region: West Coast Region
- District: Westland District

Physical characteristics
- Source: Barlow Glacier
  - location: Southern Alps / Kā Tiritiri o te Moana
  - coordinates: 43°18′24″S 170°37′30″E
  - elevation: 1,400 m (4,600 ft)
- Mouth: Perth River
  - coordinates: 43°20′51″S 170°31′15″E
  - elevation: 215 m (705 ft)
- Length: 13.8 kilometres (8.6 mi)

Basin features
- Progression: Barlow Glacier → Barlow River → Perth River → Whataroa River
- River system: Whataroa River
- Tributaries
  - right: North Barlow River

The Barlow River is a river in the Westland district of the South Island of New Zealand. It is a tributary of the Perth River. The Barlow River is fed by the Barlow and Farrar Glacier. Its tributary North Barlow River is fed by the Escape and Siege Glacier. A smaller stream called Barlow Creek lies 1 kilometre (0.6 mi) west of the Barlow River.

== See also ==
- List of rivers of New Zealand
