= Les Riley =

English cricketer

Leslie Ernest Riley (26 January 1908 – 9 August 1999) was an English first-class cricketer of the 1930s who played for Auckland and Wellington in New Zealand.

Born in St Pancras, London, England, Riley moved to New Zealand and appeared in six first-class matches as a left-handed batsman who bowled slow left-arm orthodox. He scored 164 runs, with a highest score of 67, and took 21 wickets. He achieved his best bowling figures in his debut first-class match against Otago when he took 6 for 89 in the second innings.

He toured Fiji with a New Zealand team in 1935–36, leading the bowling with 44 wickets in the non-first-class matches.

Riley died aged 91 in Auckland, New Zealand.
