= Butler River =

River in New Zealand

- Route of the Butler River
- Mouth of the Butler River Butler River (South Island)

Location
- Country: New Zealand
- region: West Coast Region
- District: Westland District

Physical characteristics
- Source: Whataroa Glacier
  - location: Southern Alps / Kā Tiritiri o te Moana
  - coordinates: 43°24′10″S 170°30′28″E
  - elevation: 1,200 m (3,900 ft)
- Mouth: Whataroa River
  - location: 15 kilometres (9 mi) southeast of Whataroa
  - coordinates: 43°24′30″S 170°24′48″E
  - elevation: 310 m (1,020 ft)
- Length: 8.9 kilometres (5.5 mi)

Basin features
- Progression: Whataroa Glacier → Shackleton Glacier → Butler River → Whataroa River
- River system: Whataroa River
- Waterbodies: Ice Lake

The Butler River is a river of New Zealand. The source of the river is the Whataroa Glacier on the north western slopes of McKinnon Peak in the Southern Alps. From there the river flows in a west direction reaching the Whataroa River 15 kilometres (9 mi) southeast of Whataroa.

== See also ==
- List of rivers of New Zealand
