= Don Crabb =

New Zealand footballer

Personal information
- Full name: Donald Angus Crabb
- Date of birth: 25 September 1910
- Place of birth: New Zealand
- Date of death: 27 August 1999 (aged 88)
- Place of death: Palmerston North, New Zealand

Senior career*
Years	Team	Apps	(Gls)
- Hamilton United

International career
1933	New Zealand	2	(0)
- * Club domestic league appearances and goals

Donald Angus Crabb (25 September 1910 – 27 August 1999) was an association football player who represented New Zealand at international level.

Crabb played two official A-international matches for the All Whites in 1933 against trans-Tasman neighbours Australia as part of a 13-match tour, the first a 2–4 loss on 5 June 1933, his second a 4–6 loss on 17 June.
