= Frances River =

Coordinates: 43°22′30″S 170°45′55″E

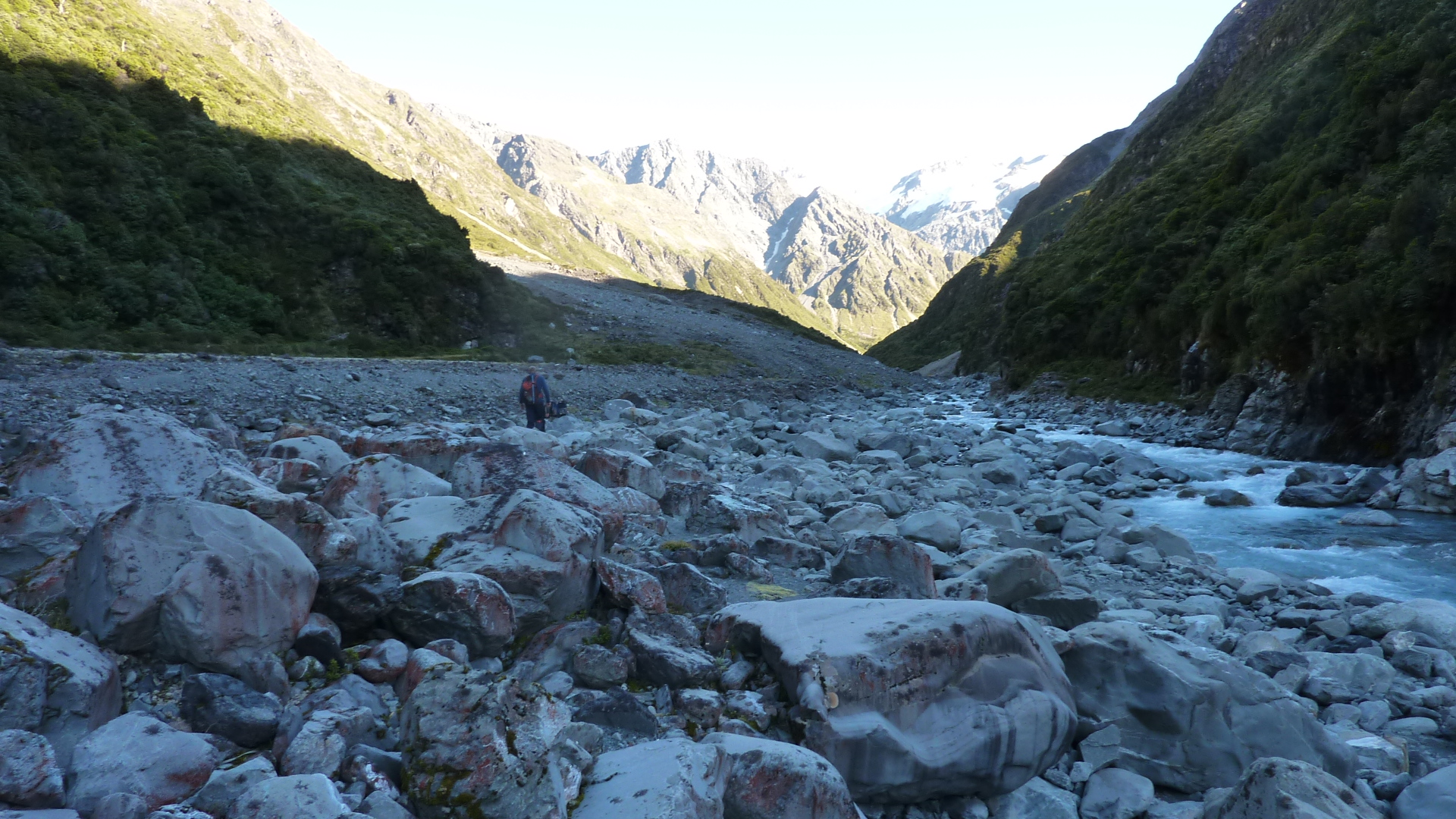
- The Frances River is a tributary of the Clyde River / Rangitata River

Location
- Country: New Zealand

Physical characteristics
- Source
  - location: Lambert Col
- Mouth
  - location: Clyde River

The Frances River is a river of New Zealand. It arises near Lambert Col and flows south to join McCoy Stream to form the Clyde River. The Clyde flows into the Rangitata River, which eventually exits into the Pacific Ocean.

== See also ==
- List of rivers of New Zealand
