= Garth Harris =

New Zealand academic tax lawyer

Garth Alexander Harris (1947 – 14 November 1999) was a New Zealand academic tax lawyer. He was one of New Zealand's leading tax scholars and the country's foremost writer and thinker on international taxation.

== Early life ==
Harris was educated by the Christian Brothers at St Peter's College, Auckland and in his final year (1965), he won the Taylor Cup for Languages. He studied law at the University of Auckland gaining an LL.B (Hons) in 1973 and an M.Jur in 1978.

== Career ==
When he died in 1999, Harris was associate professor of law at University of Auckland, specialising in tax law. He was head of the Department of Commercial Law at Auckland University 1995-1998; he was also director of the Master of Taxation Studies programme "for nearly a decade and was responsible for its development and evolution". His particular area of specialisation was international tax " ... and he wrote the leading text in the area New Zealand's International Taxation published by Oxford University Press in 1990. Harris' final text was Income Tax in New Zealand. However, Harris died [from cancer] in late 1999 and did not see [its publication]", it being completed by other authors. Harris was also the founding editor of the New Zealand Journal of Taxation Law and Policy. Ian Eagles, Professor of Commercial Law wrote: "[Garth Harris] ... guided successive cohorts of masters and honours students through their thesis and dissertations not only with rigour but also patience, compassion and gentle humour. In everything he did Garth was decent, straightforward and unassuming. He was content to let his work speak for him. Garth was one of New Zealand's leading tax scholars and the country's foremost writer and thinker on international taxation. He was responsible for the emergence of taxation as a serious subject for postgraduate study in his own University. Garth's reputation in the legal and accounting professions was immense".

== Death ==
Harris died on 14 November 1999.

== Garth Harris' major publications ==
- Garth Harris, Banks’ responsibility for the payment and collection of cheques, Dissertation for LLB (Hons), University of Auckland, 1973.
- Garth Harris, The rule in Foss v. Harbottle, Thesis for M.Jur, University of Auckland, 1978.
- Garth Harris and Wayne Mapp, Goods and Services Tax : the Application of the Act, Butterworths, Wellington, 1986.
- Garth Harris, Wayne Mapp and Alan Teixeira, Goods and Services Tax : the Legal and Planning Implications, University of Auckland, Dept. of Accountancy, 1986.
- Garth Harris, New Zealand’s International Taxation, Oxford University Press, Auckland, 1990.
- Garth Harris (et al.), Income Tax in New Zealand, Thomson Brookers, Wellington, 2004.
