= Miguel Porteous =

New Zealand freestyle skier

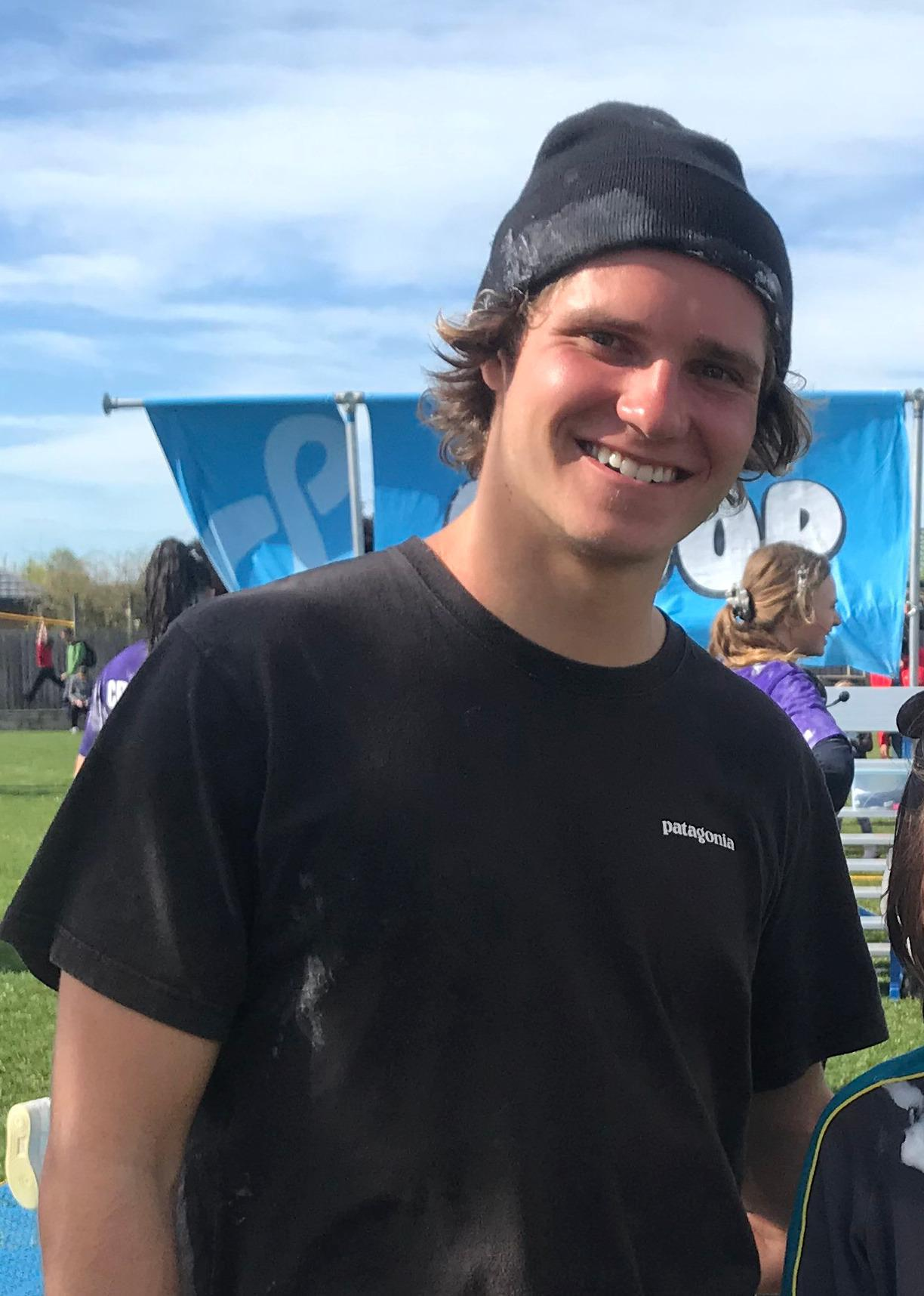
- Porteous on the set of What Now in Rolleston, 2019.

Personal information
- Born: 14 May 1999 (age 27) Hamilton, New Zealand
- Relative: Nico Porteous (brother)

Sport
- Country: New Zealand
- Sport: Freestyle skiing
- Event: Halfpipe
Medal record
Representing New Zealand
Winter X Games
| Silver medal – second place | 2017 Aspen | SuperPipe |

Miguel Porteous (born 14 May 1999) is a New Zealand freestyle skier who competes internationally.

He represented New Zealand in the 2018 Winter Olympics, where he finished 17th in the men's ski halfpipe and the 2022 Winter Olympics where he made it to the final of the men's ski halfpipe.

== Winter X Games XXI ==
Miguel took home the silver medal during the 2017 Winter X Games which were held in Aspen, Colorado. He had a score of 81.00 points and skied wearing a cast due to a broken wrist.

Porteous is the older brother of freestyle skier Nico Porteous.
