= List of Kansas wildlife management areas =

Kansas wildlife management areas are protected conservation areas within the U.S. State of Kansas. Wildlife management areas fall under the Kansas Department of Wildlife and Parks, with enforcement by the Natural Resource Officer (Game Warden).

== List of wildlife areas ==
Wildlife management areas are divided into five regions:

=== Region 1 ===
Northwest Kansas:

- Brzon: 2,000 acres (810 ha) Michael Brzon Wildlife Area.
- Cedar Bluff
- Francis Wachs
- Glen Elder
- Gove Public Domain
- Griswold
- Gurley Salt Marsh
- Jamestown
- Jewell
- Kansas Veteran's
- Keith Sebelius Reservoir / Norton
- Logan
- Lovewell
- Ottawa
- Rooks
- Saline
- Sheridan
- Smoky Hill/ Kanopolis
- South Fork
- St. Francis
- Talmo
- Webster
- Wilson

=== Region 2 ===
Northeast Kansas:

- Atchison: Atchison State Fishing Lake (66 acres (27 ha)) and Wildlife Area (182 acres (74 ha)).
- Benedictine Bottoms
- Bolton
- Brown
- Clinton
- Douglas
- Elwood
- Geary
- Green
- Hillsdale
- Jeffrey Energy Center
- Kansas River
- Leavenworth
- Leslie T. and Lydia A. Fitzgerald
- Miami Aerial Imagery
- Milford
- Nebo
- Nemaha
- Oak Mills
- Perry
- Pottawatomie Lake No. 1
- Rutlader
- Shawnee
- Tuttle Creek
- Washington

=== Region 3 ===
Southwest Kansas:

- Barber
- Big Basin Prairie Preserve
- Cheyenne Bottoms
- Clark
- Concannon
- Cottonwood Flats
- Finney
- Ford
- Garton
- Goodman
- Greeley
- Hain
- Hamilton
- Herron Playa
- Hodgeman
- Isabel
- Kepley Wildlife Area
- Lane
- Meade
- Pratt Sandhills
- Sandsage Bison Range: Sandsage Bison Range Wildlife Area 3,760 acres (1,520 ha).
- Scott
- Stein Playa
- Texas Lake
- Wild Turkey Playa

=== Region 4 ===
South Central Kansas:

- Binger
- Butler
- Byron Walker
- Chase
- Cheney
- Council Grove
- Cowley
- El Dorado
- Ferris Demonstration
- Kaw
- Marion
- Maxwell
- McPherson Valley Wetlands
- Slate Creek

=== Region 5 ===
Southeast Kansas:

- Berentz-Dick (Buffalo Ranch): 1,360 acres (550 ha) in Montgomery County.
- Big Hill Wildlife Area: 6,400 acres (2,600 ha) on the southeast corner of the 1,240 acres (500 ha) Pearson-Skubitz Big Hill Lake and 364 acres (147 ha) park.
- Bourbon
- Cherokee Lowlands
- Copan
- Dove Flats
- Duck Creek
- Elk City
- Fall River
- Grand Osage
- Harmon
- Hollister
- John Redmond
- La Cygne
- Lyon
- Marais des Cygnes
- Melvern
- Mined Land
- Neosho
- Osage
- Shoal Creek
- Spring River
- Toronto
- Wilson
- Woodson

== See also ==
List of Kansas state parks
