= Perth River =

River in New Zealand

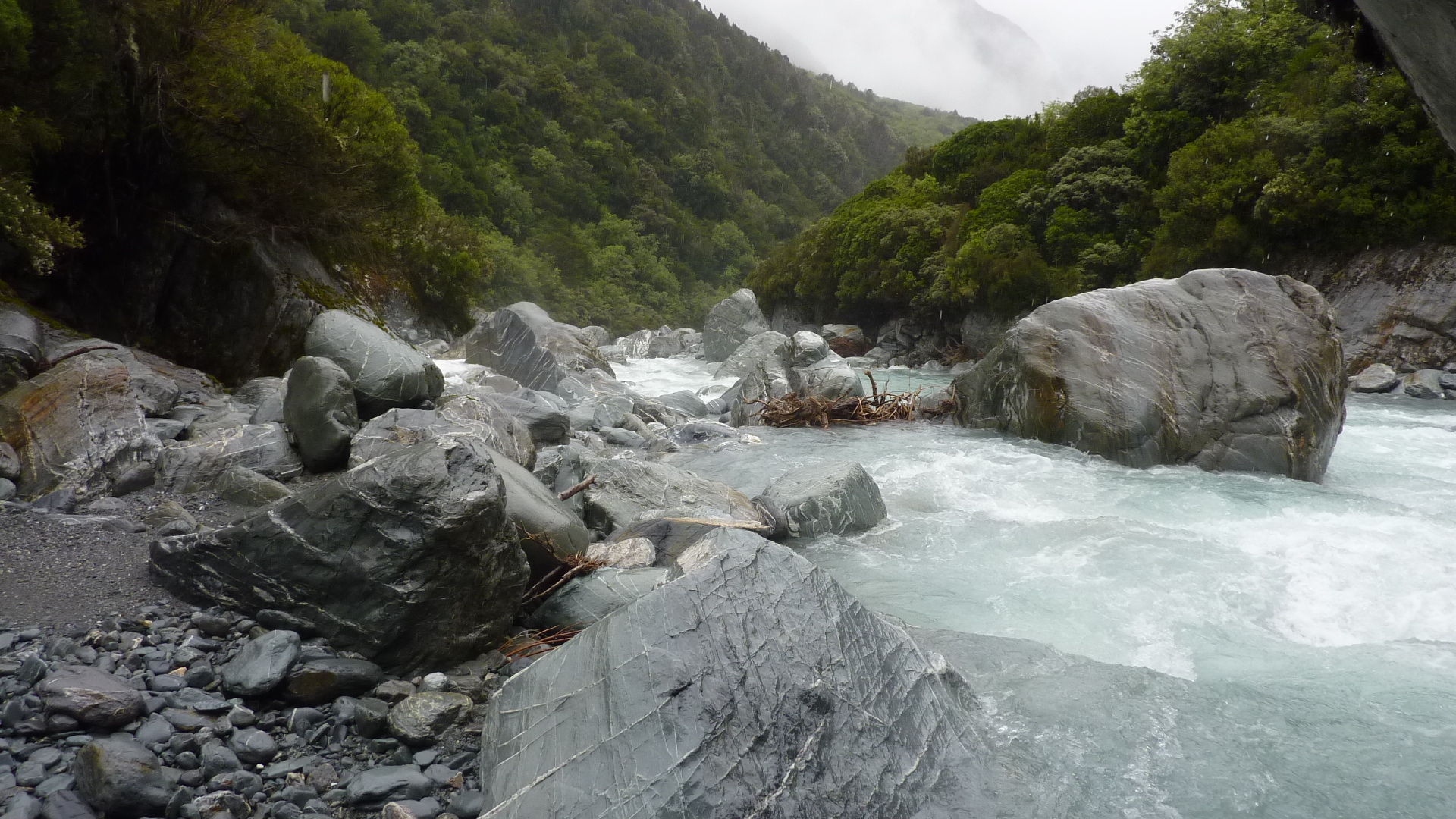
- Upper Reaches of the Perth River

Location
- District: Westland District
- Region: West Coast Region
- Country: New Zealand

Physical characteristics
- Source: Perth Glacier
- Mouth
  - location: Whataroa River
  - coordinates: 43°20′S 170°27′E

Basin features
- Tributaries
  - left: Barlow River

The Perth River is a river in the Southern Alps in the West Coast region of New Zealand's South Island. Its source is in terrace icefields north of the Rangitata Divide and is joined by multiple tributaries, including a creek from Abel Lake. It features a number of rapids and passes through two gorges before meeting the Whataroa River. The river is largely inaccessible, but recently, an adventure tourism company has begun offering "heli-rafting" on the river: whitewater rafters are flown in by helicopter to raft the river.

== Recreation ==
Kayakers have been flying ("heli-boating") up the Perth for a number of years. The normal rafting put-in at Five-Finger stream gives a nice class III-IV run with one amazing gorge. By flying up to Scone Hut, the trip becomes one of the best IV-V runs on the coast. More recently paddlers have been flying or walking upstream of scone hut for some V-V+ excitement.

The Perth River valley track is an advanced tramping route along the valley. The full out and back route takes three or more days and provides access to a large area of Department of Conservation land. The route has two backcountry huts, Nolans Hut and Scone Hut.

== Conservation ==
Zero Invasive Predators Ltd (ZIP) established a pest control programme in the Perth River Valley in 2015. The Perth, Barlow Rivers, and Southern Alps bound the 12,000 hectares (30,000 acres) area. In order to detect and eliminate all incursions, ZIP placed 368 trail cameras and 17 ZIP cameras in the Perth Barlow block. As surrounding blocks were removed of predators, this number went down. In 2022, there were only 91 cameras in the camera network. The programme has effectively eradicated all pests in the valley, and its techniques and findings will be important in further conservation efforts across New Zealand.
