= Whataroa River =

River in West Coast Region, New Zealand

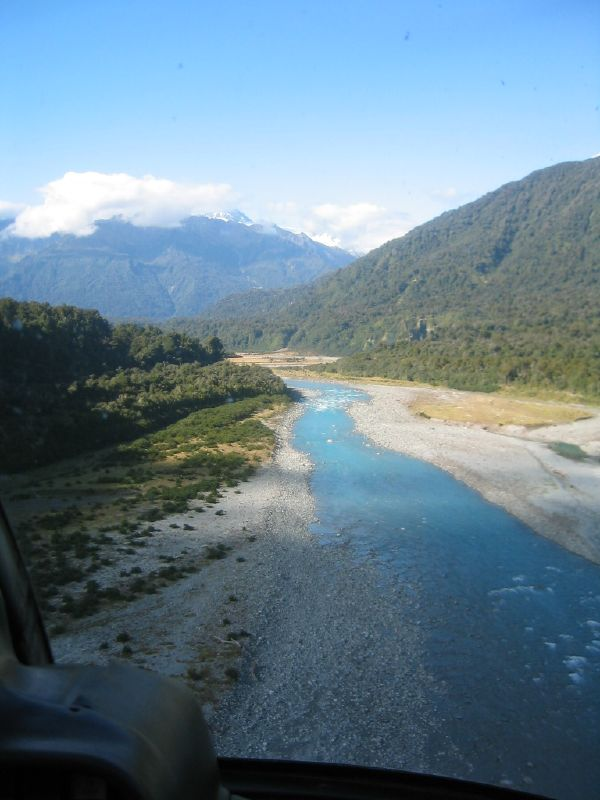
- Whataroa River flowing out to the Tasman Sea

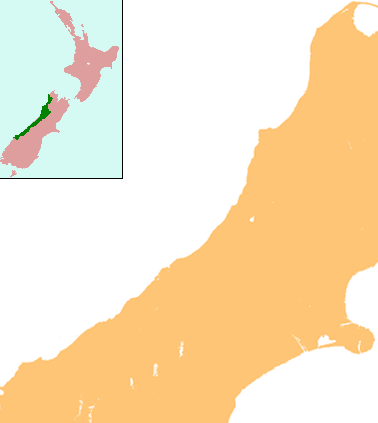
- Location within West Coast
- Native name: Whataroa (Māori)

Location
- District: Westland District
- Region: West Coast Region
- Country: New Zealand

Physical characteristics
- Mouth
  - location: Tasman Sea
  - coordinates: 43°07′S 170°15′E

Basin features
- Tributaries
  - left: Butler River, Perth River
  - right: Gunn River

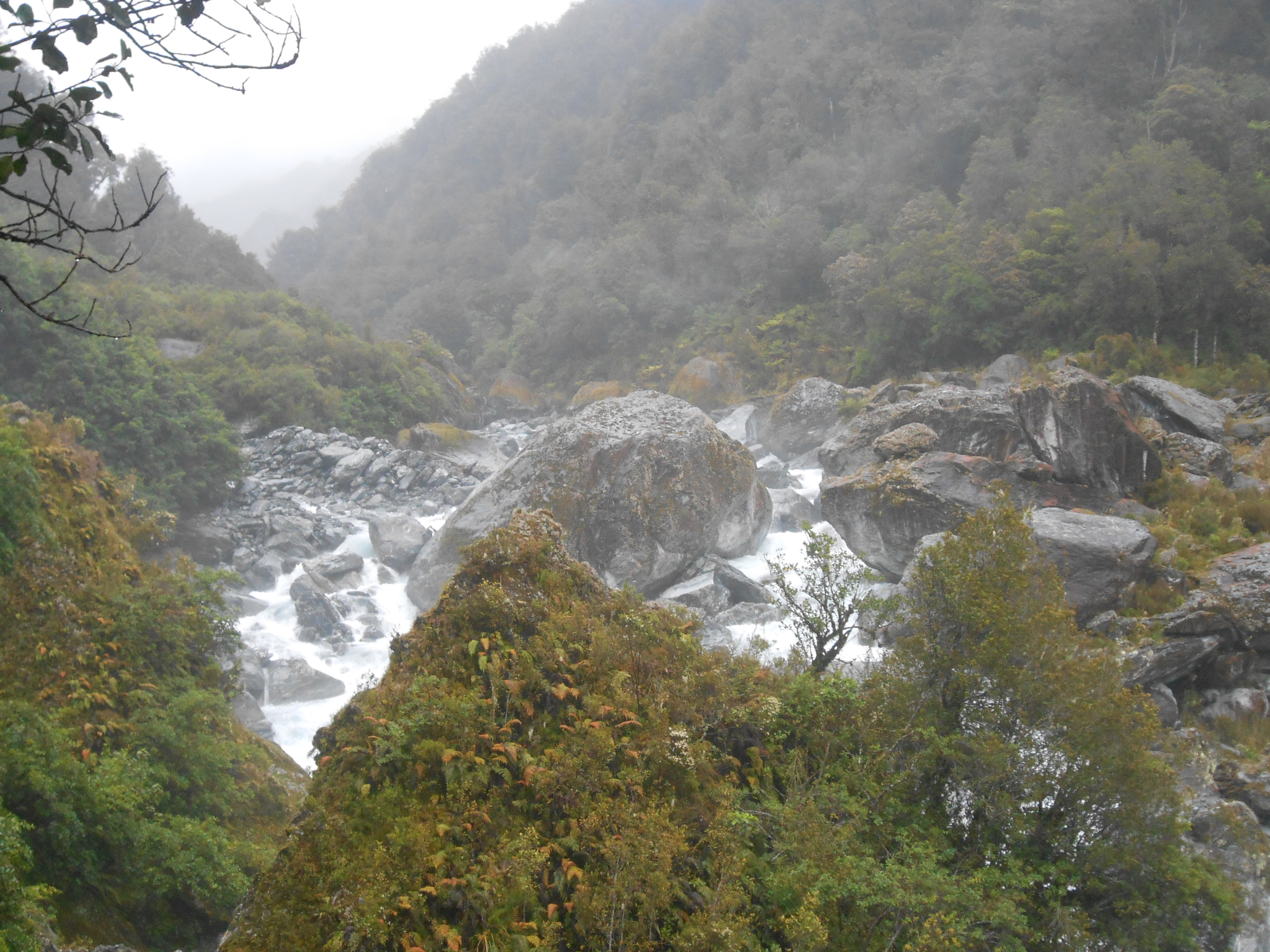
Whataroa River - Upper Reaches. Above the Butler River Junction.

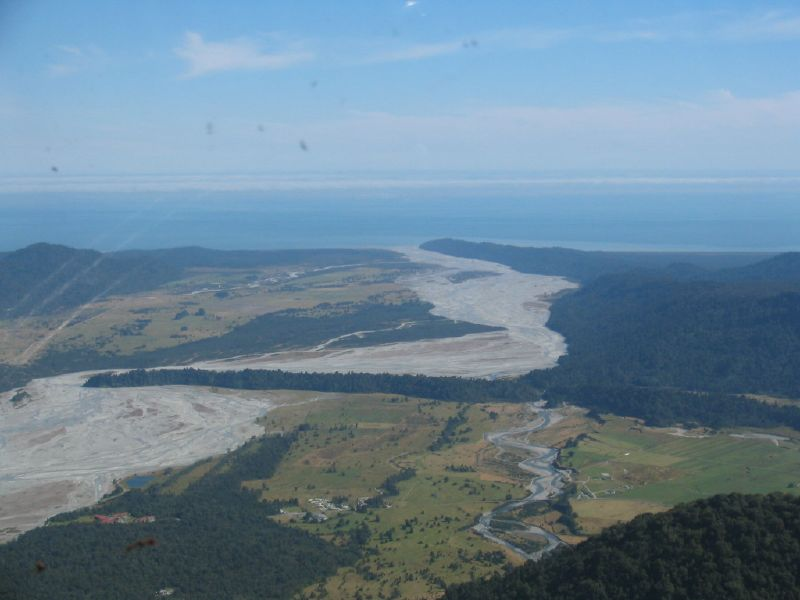
Whataroa River flowing into the Tasman Sea

The Whataroa River, sometimes the Wataroa River, is a river in the southern West Coast region of New Zealand's South Island. Its source is below Hochstetter Dome in the Southern Alps and it flows north and northwest, passing the township of Whataroa on the eastern side before reaching the Tasman Sea just south of Abut Head. The river is fed by many tributaries, such as the Perth River, and is crossed by State Highway 6 on its route between Whataroa and Te Taho.

== Recreation ==
Whitewater rafting takes place on the river as an adventure tourism activity. Access to the upper reaches of the river for rafting is either via hiking or helicopter. The river also flows through areas used for tramping and climbing.
