= Hari Hari =

Town in the West Coast Region of New Zealand

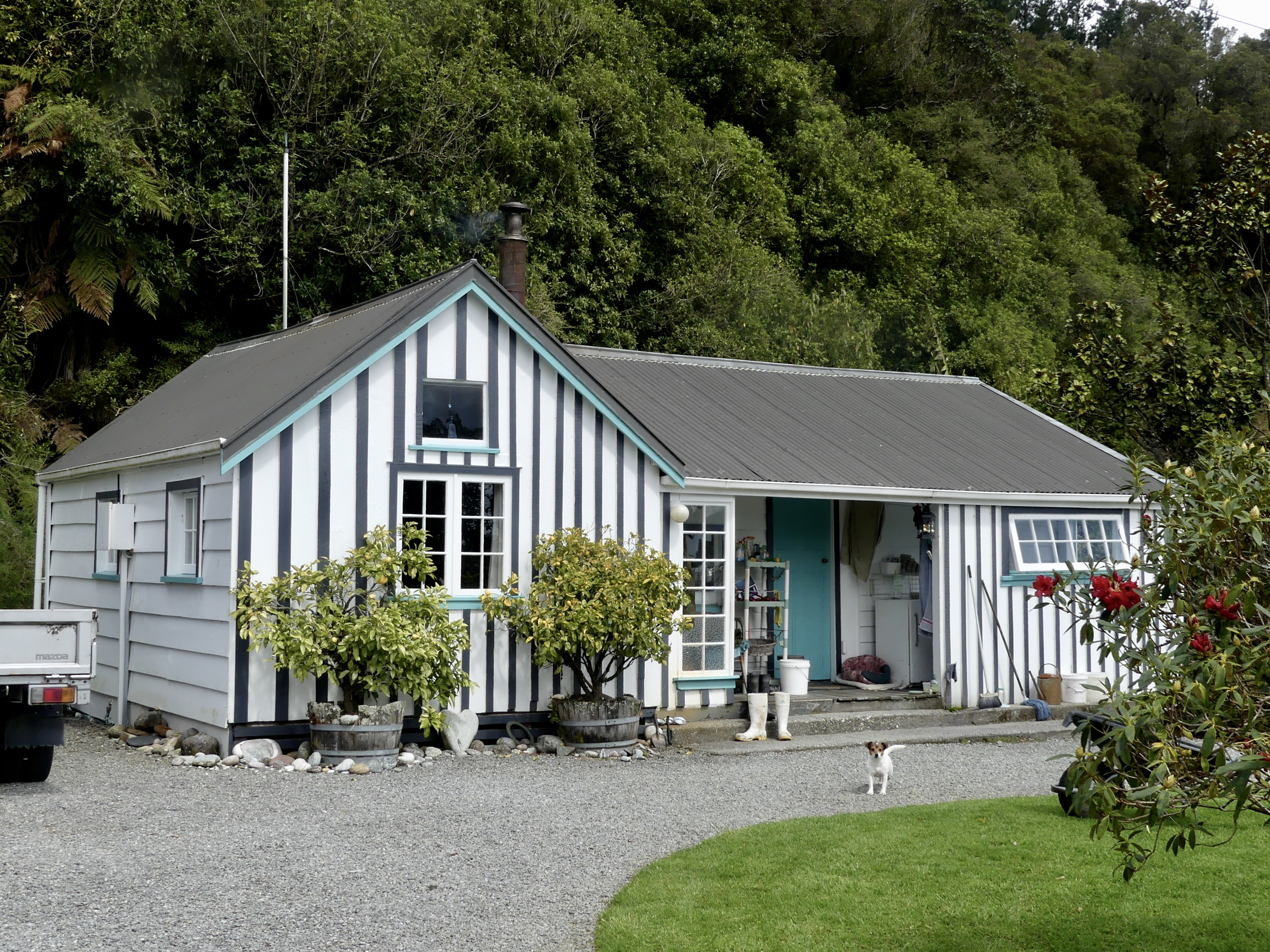
- Hende's Ferry Cottage, a historic building by the bank of the Wanganui River in Hari Hari
- Interactive map of Hari Hari
- Coordinates: 43°9′0″S 170°33′43″E
- Country: New Zealand
- Region: West Coast
- District: Westland District
- Ward: Southern
- Electorates: West Coast-Tasman; Te Tai Tonga

Government
  - Territorial Authority: Westland District Council
  - Regional council: West Coast Regional Council
  - Mayor of Westland: Helen Lash
  - West Coast-Tasman MP: Katie Milne
  - Te Tai Tonga MP: Mananui Ramsden

Area
  - Total: 50.43 km^{2} (19.47 sq mi)

Population (June 2025)
  - Total: 250
  - Density: 5.0/km^{2} (13/sq mi)
- Time zone: UTC+12 (NZST)
  - Summer (DST): UTC+13 (NZDT)
- Postcode: 7884
- Area code: 03
- Local iwi: Ngāi Tahu

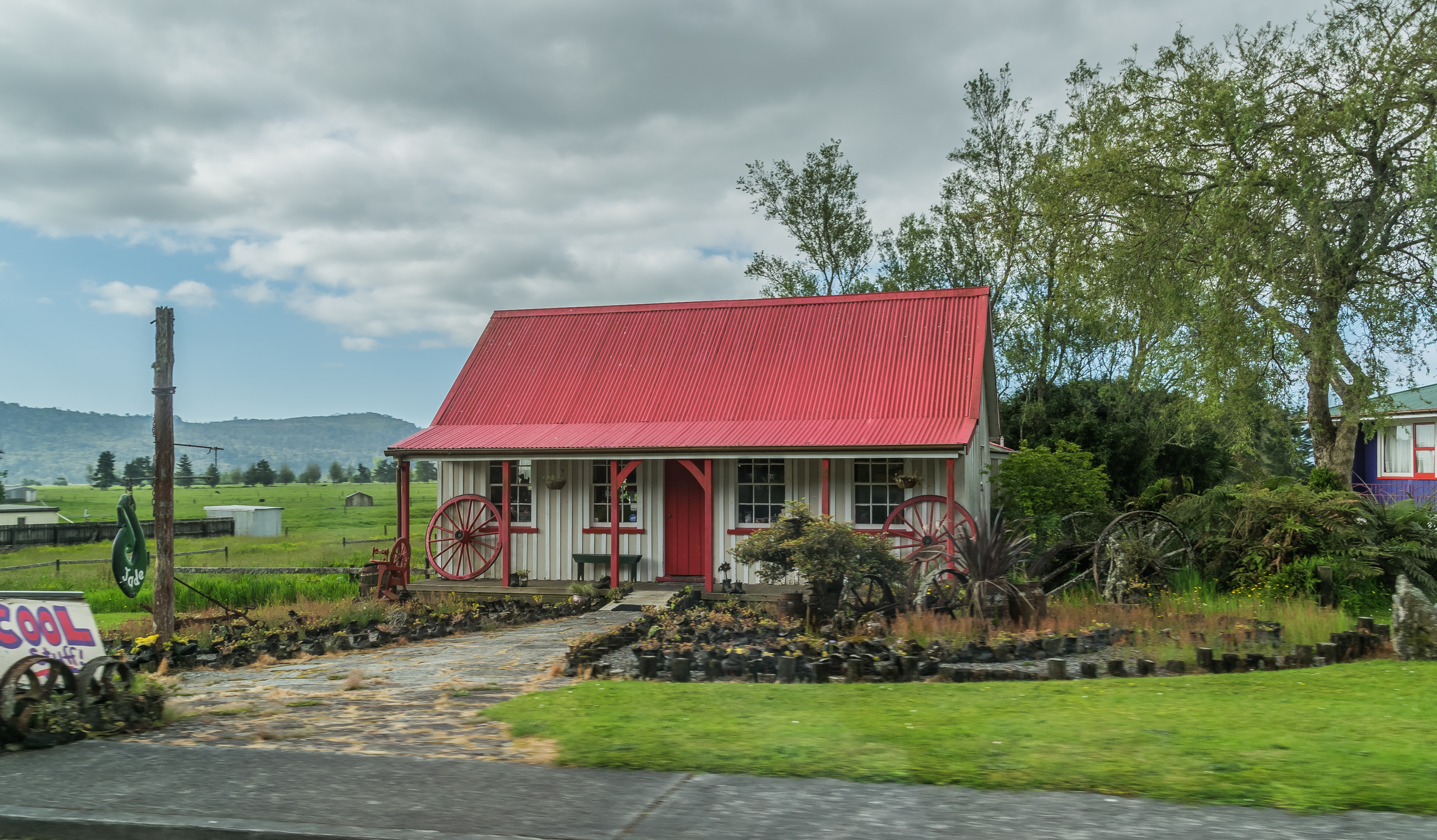
The Willows Craft Cottage

Hari Hari (sometimes spelled Harihari) is a small rural settlement in the south west of the West Coast region of New Zealand's South Island. It is slightly inland from the Tasman Sea and the Saltwater Lagoon and is situated between the Wanganui and Poerua Rivers, 45 minutes south of the tourist town of Hokitika. State Highway 6 passes through the town on its route from Ross to the Franz Josef Glacier. The Westland District's largest town, Greymouth is 110 kilometres (68 mi), and Hokitika 70 km (43 mi) to the north-east. Ross is 46 km (29 mi) to the north-east, and Franz Josef is 61.4 km south west.

Hari Hari was once a logging settlement and relics of a bush tramway that used to carry timber can be found in the area. Today, the forest in the area is protected and popular activities in the Hari Hari area include bushwalking, birdwatching, and trout and salmon fishing.

The Inter-Wanganui Co-op opened a dairy factory at Hari Hari in 1908, but it is now a ruin.

Hari Hari's main claim to fame occurred on 7 January 1931, when Australian aviator Guy Menzies landed upside down in a swamp near Hari Hari, completing the first solo flight across the Tasman Sea. Menzies, who had left Sydney 11 hours and 45 minutes earlier, was aiming for Blenheim but had been blown off course and mistook a swamp for flat pasture suitable for landing. Despite the accident, he was unharmed. On 7 January 2006, the 75th anniversary celebrations of the feat were held in Hari Hari, with roughly 400 people in attendance. To mark the occasion, Dick Smith recreated Guy Menzies' flight, though Smith chose to land upright in Hari Hari.

== Local name change controversy ==
The name Hari Hari, has a Māori meaning, from Te Aka Māori/English Dictionary, as "to take/carry joy" or, as local legend suggests, "come together in unison" from a Māori canoe paddling chant/song. Williams' dictionary gives "Harihari" as the correct spelling for that meaning. while Te Aka online Maori Dictionary states "Harihari" (one word) can mean a medium sized clam. Also, "waka harihari tūroro", has the meaning of "ambulance" (according to the Te Aka Dictionary). In recent years, Hari Hari has been increasingly referred to as "Harihari". No official statutory process has taken place in order for this to happen.

Many local residents are upset about the growing number of official websites, and official documentation, referring to Hari Hari as being "Harihari". The greater community insists that they were not informed or talked to about this matter, and are against the gradual unofficial change. Some are being active about keeping their town's name the same, and have involved the Department of Māori Affairs about the tampering with of a traditional Māori place name. Town signs around Hari Hari still state the name is Hari Hari. One newly placed town distance sign in Whataroa shows the name "Harihari".

The town was named Hari Hari in September, 1908, when a post office was needed for the township. Local historian, Vic Berry writes about this, with a photo, in his popular West Coast book. "Goa Way back- Early Hari Hari". Although, there is one record of the town being named "Harihari" in 1955. There are conficting sources of information in relation to the original name, to this day. Thought to be caused by surveyors, over the decades. the office was opened on 18 September 1908.

== Demographics ==
Harihari is described by Stats NZ as a rural settlement and covers 50.43 km^{2} (19.47 sq mi). It had an estimated population of 250 as of June 2025, with a population density of 5.0 people per km^{2}. The settlement is part of the larger Whataroa-Harihari statistical area.

Historical population for Hari Hari
Year	Pop.	±% p.a.
2006	264	—
2013	243	−1.18%
2018	237	−0.50%
2023	249	+0.99%

Harihari had a population of 249 in the 2023 New Zealand census, an increase of 12 people (5.1%) since the 2018 census, and an increase of 6 people (2.5%) since the 2013 census. There were 123 males and 126 females in 114 dwellings. 2.4% of people identified as LGBTIQ+. The median age was 49.3 years (compared with 38.1 years nationally). There were 45 people (18.1%) aged under 15 years, 27 (10.8%) aged 15 to 29, 120 (48.2%) aged 30 to 64, and 54 (21.7%) aged 65 or older.

People could identify as more than one ethnicity. The results were 95.2% European (Pākehā), 12.0% Māori, and 1.2% Asian. English was spoken by 98.8%, Māori by 3.6%, and other languages by 3.6%. No language could be spoken by 2.4% (e.g. too young to talk). The percentage of people born overseas was 7.2, compared with 28.8% nationally.

The sole religious affiliation given was 31.3% Christian. People who answered that they had no religion were 55.4%, and 13.3% of people did not answer the census question.

Of those at least 15 years old, 30 (14.7%) people had a bachelor's or higher degree, 105 (51.5%) had a post-high school certificate or diploma, and 72 (35.3%) people exclusively held high school qualifications. The median income was $26,100, compared with $41,500 nationally. 12 people (5.9%) earned over $100,000 compared to 12.1% nationally. The employment status of those at least 15 was 90 (44.1%) full-time, 33 (16.2%) part-time, and 6 (2.9%) unemployed.

=== Whataroa-Harihari statistical area ===
Whataroa-Harihari statistical area, which also includes Whataroa, covers 1,136.25 km^{2} (438.71 sq mi) and had an estimated population of 650 as of June 2025, with a population density of 0.57 people per km^{2}.

Historical population for Whataroa-Harihari
Year	Pop.	±% p.a.
2006	753	—
2013	612	−2.92%
2018	642	+0.96%
2023	645	+0.09%

Whataroa-Harihari had a population of 645 in the 2023 New Zealand census, an increase of 3 people (0.5%) since the 2018 census, and an increase of 33 people (5.4%) since the 2013 census. There were 339 males, 306 females, and 3 people of other genders in 291 dwellings. 2.8% of people identified as LGBTIQ+. The median age was 45.7 years (compared with 38.1 years nationally). There were 123 people (19.1%) aged under 15 years, 84 (13.0%) aged 15 to 29, 336 (52.1%) aged 30 to 64, and 108 (16.7%) aged 65 or older.

People could identify as more than one ethnicity. The results were 89.3% European (Pākehā); 14.4% Māori; 2.3% Pasifika; 3.7% Asian; 0.9% Middle Eastern, Latin American and African New Zealanders (MELAA); and 3.7% other, which includes people giving their ethnicity as "New Zealander". English was spoken by 97.7%, Māori by 2.3%, and other languages by 6.0%. No language could be spoken by 2.3% (e.g. too young to talk). The percentage of people born overseas was 12.1, compared with 28.8% nationally.

Religious affiliations were 31.2% Christian, 0.5% Islam, 0.5% New Age, and 2.3% other religions. People who answered that they had no religion were 54.0%, and 11.6% of people did not answer the census question.

Of those at least 15 years old, 63 (12.1%) people had a bachelor's or higher degree, 288 (55.2%) had a post-high school certificate or diploma, and 177 (33.9%) people exclusively held high school qualifications. The median income was $35,300, compared with $41,500 nationally. 33 people (6.3%) earned over $100,000 compared to 12.1% nationally. The employment status of those at least 15 was 264 (50.6%) full-time, 87 (16.7%) part-time, and 15 (2.9%) unemployed.

== Education ==
South Westland Area School is a coeducational composite school (years 1–15), with a roll of 117 students as of July 2026. It opened in 1969, replacing Hari Hari School which had existed since 1865. The school has a satellite class at Franz Josef Glacier School.

There is also a University of Canterbury Field Station, "The Green Elephant".

== Climate ==
Climate data for Hari Hari (1971–2000)
Month	Jan	Feb	Mar	Apr	May	Jun	Jul	Aug	Sep	Oct	Nov	Dec	Year
Mean daily maximum °C (°F)	20.4 (68.7)	21.2 (70.2)	19.9 (67.8)	17.5 (63.5)	15.0 (59.0)	12.7 (54.9)	12.5 (54.5)	13.3 (55.9)	14.3 (57.7)	15.7 (60.3)	17.0 (62.6)	19.2 (66.6)	16.6 (61.8)
Daily mean °C (°F)	15.6 (60.1)	16.0 (60.8)	14.6 (58.3)	12.1 (53.8)	9.2 (48.6)	6.7 (44.1)	6.4 (43.5)	7.5 (45.5)	9.3 (48.7)	11.0 (51.8)	12.4 (54.3)	14.5 (58.1)	11.3 (52.3)
Mean daily minimum °C (°F)	10.7 (51.3)	10.8 (51.4)	9.2 (48.6)	6.6 (43.9)	3.3 (37.9)	0.8 (33.4)	0.2 (32.4)	1.8 (35.2)	4.3 (39.7)	6.3 (43.3)	7.8 (46.0)	9.8 (49.6)	6.0 (42.7)
Average rainfall mm (inches)	480.8 (18.93)	265.9 (10.47)	443.2 (17.45)	285.1 (11.22)	257.8 (10.15)	320.8 (12.63)	370.7 (14.59)	202.7 (7.98)	294.2 (11.58)	339.6 (13.37)	364.5 (14.35)	540.6 (21.28)	4,165.9 (164)
Source: CliFlo (rain 1981–2010)
