= Wanganui River =

River in New Zealand

Coordinates: 43°02′07″S 170°25′50″E

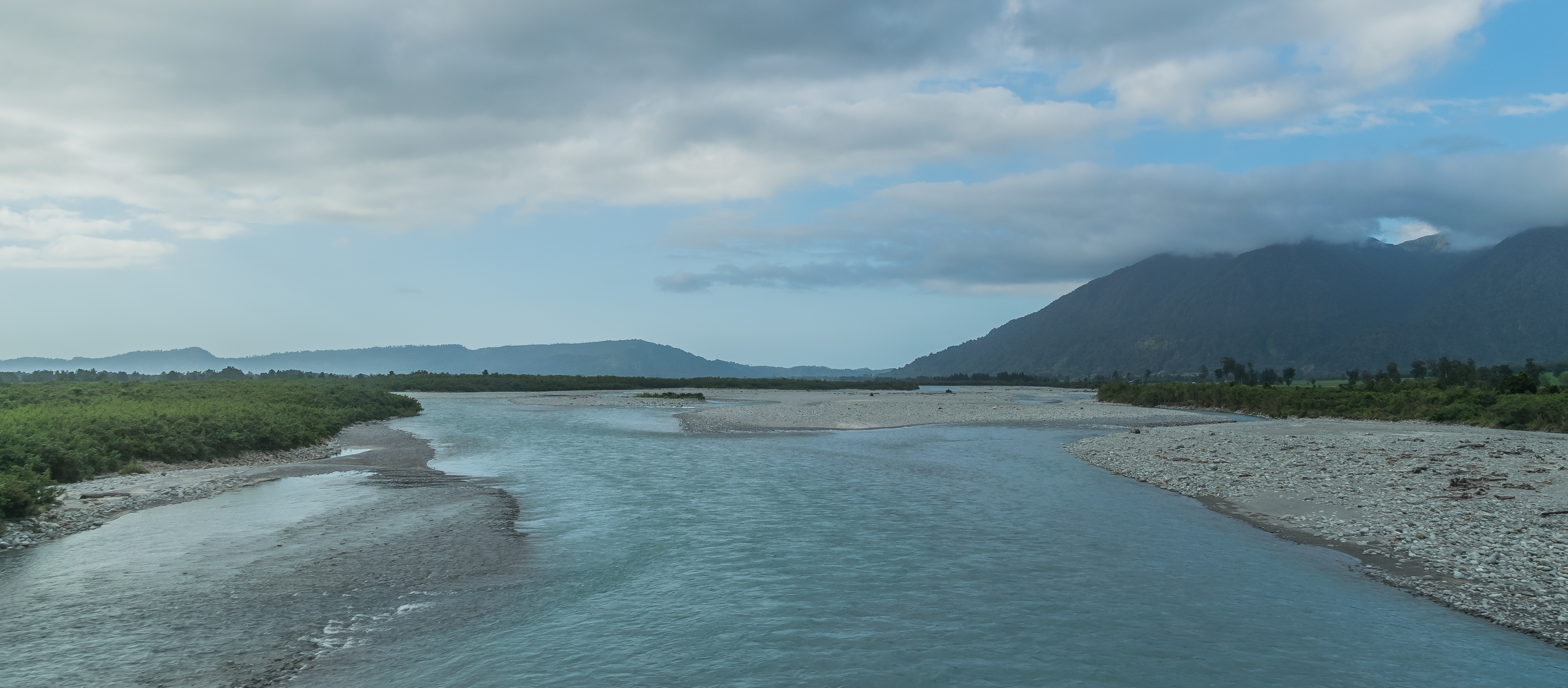

Location
- Country: New Zealand
- Region: West Coast
- District: Westland

Physical characteristics
- Source
  - location: Southern Alps
- Mouth
  - location: Tasman Sea
- Length: 55 kilometres (34 mi)

Basin features
- Tributaries
  - left: Lambert River, Adams River, Oneone River
  - right: Smyth River

The Wanganui River is in the West Coast of the South Island of New Zealand. It flows northwest for 55 kilometres (34 mi) from its headwaters in the Southern Alps, entering the Tasman Sea near Lake Ianthe, 40 kilometres (25 mi) southwest of Hokitika.

After heavy rain in January 2013 the flooded river partially washed away the single-lane road bridge that carries State Highway 6, closing the only through road on the West Coast.

Gravel buildup has gradually raised the riverbed, and in 2021 the West Coast Regional Council planned to elevate stopbanks by 1 m at a cost of $5.7 million to protect neighbouring farmland from flooding. Farmers protested the rates rise that would be needed to pay back this 30-year loan, and suggested the Department of Conservation should contribute.

In March 2023, the river broke through a hole in the stopbank on the north side, and caused significant flooding damage to several farms.

In April 2023, a river engineer briefed local farmers, and outlined the history of development of stop banks on the river. In 1948, the river had a wide and natural braided river course. However, over a period of 60 years, stop banks were constructed along the original river bed to create pasture land. The result was that the river became increasing constrained, taking up only half of the area it previously occupied. The consequence is that the rate of aggradation has doubled. In the area 7 kilometres (4.3 mi) downstream of the State Highway 6 bridge, the river now sits above the flood plain. The location where the river broke through the stop banks earlier in 2023 was the normal river bed in the 1960s. Construction of stop banks to narrow the river channel has also increased the gradient of the river bed, and increased the velocity of water flowing against the stop banks. Climate variability is producing more intense storms, and combined with the other factors, is increasing the threat of future breaches.

The 90 ton scow Moa (launched on 1 November 1907 by George Turnbull Niccol) ran aground at the mouth of the river on 30 March 1935 and was buried in sand and shingle. She was the ship captured by Felix von Luckner in his escape from Motuihe Island / Te Motu-a-Ihenga internment camp in 1917.
