= The Marquee (mountain) =

Mountain in the Canterbury Region of New Zealand

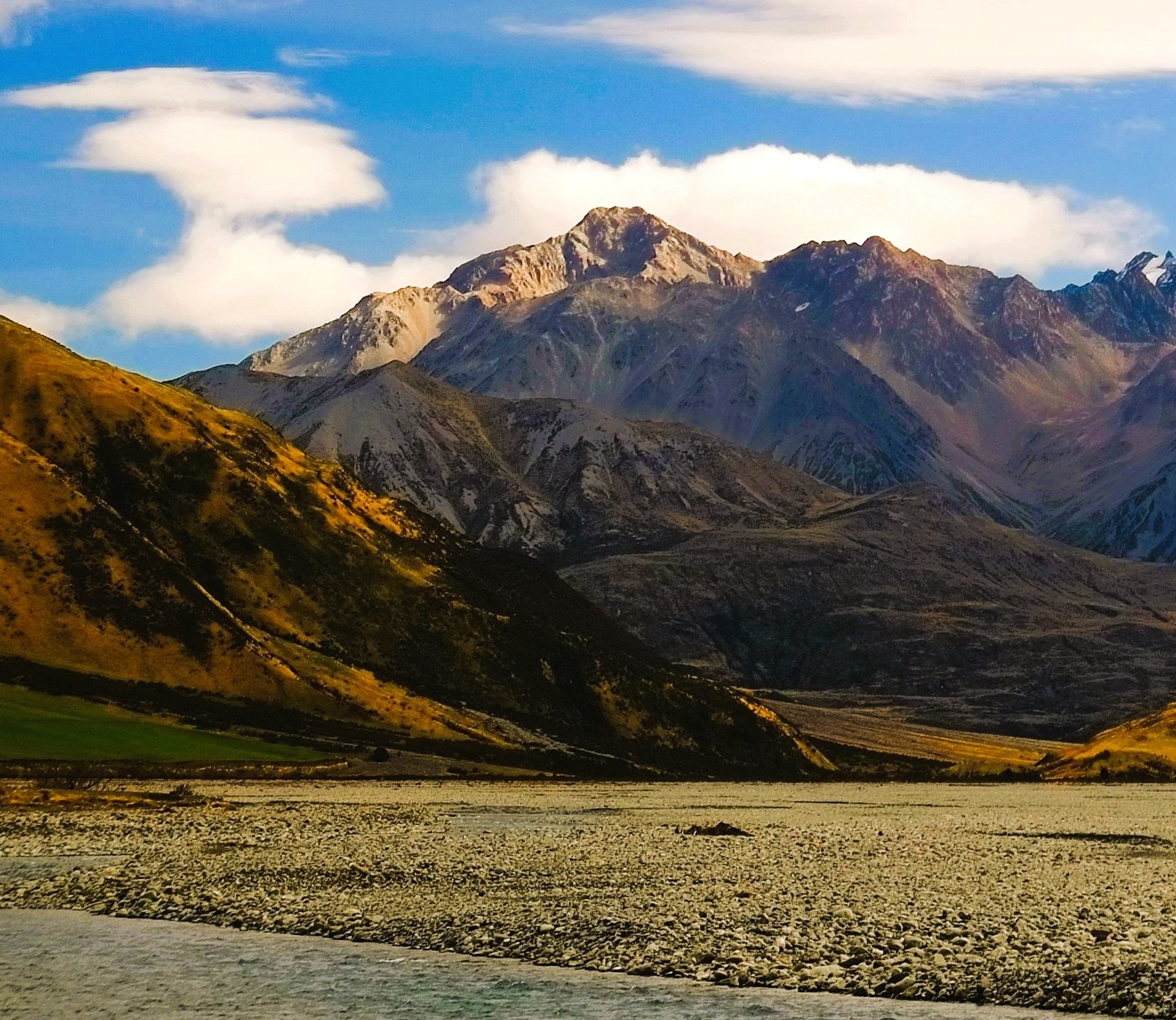
- East-northeast aspect

Highest point
- Elevation: 2,421 m (7,943 ft)
- Prominence: 417 m (1,368 ft)
- Isolation: 3.04 km (1.89 mi)
- Listing: New Zealand #96
- Coordinates: 43.34432°S 171.04468°E

Naming
- Etymology: Marquee

Geography
- Location within New Zealand
- Interactive map of The Marquee
- Location: South Island
- Country: New Zealand
- Region: Canterbury
- Parent range: Southern Alps; Arrowsmith Range
- Topo map: Topo50 BW18

Geology
- Rock age: Triassic
- Rock type: Breccia of Rakaia Terrane

Climbing
- First ascent: 1930s
- Easiest route: South Ridge

The Marquee is a 2,421-metre-elevation (7,943-foot) mountain in the Canterbury Region of New Zealand.

== Description ==
The Marquee is located 122 kilometres (76 mi) west of Christchurch in the South Island. It is set in the Arrowsmith Range of the Southern Alps. Precipitation runoff from the mountain's north and east slopes drains into tributaries of the Rakaia River, whereas the south and west slopes drain into tributaries of the Cameron River. Topographic relief is significant as the summit rises 420 metres (1,378 feet) above the south slope in one-half kilometre. The nearest higher peak is Jagged Peak, three kilometres to the west-northwest. In British English "marquee" refers more generally to a large tent, usually for social uses. The New Zealand mountaineer Rex Hall Booth (1893–1967) applied the name to complement the mountain immediately west, Tent Peak (2,448 m). The mountain's toponym has been officially approved by the New Zealand Geographic Board.

== Climbing ==
Climbing routes with first ascents:

- South Ridge – William McBeth, Rex Booth, Walter Baker, Charles Hilgendorf, Roy Twyneham – (1930s)
- North West Ridge – Dave Hall, Thomas Scott, Keith Russell, Melville Glasgow – (1950)
- West Face – FA unknown

== Climate ==
Based on the Köppen climate classification, The Marquee is located in a marine west coast (Cfb) climate zone, with a subpolar oceanic climate (Cfc) at the summit. Prevailing westerly winds blow moist air from the Tasman Sea onto the mountains, where the air is forced upwards by the mountains (orographic lift), causing moisture to drop in the form of rain or snow. The months of December through February offer the most favourable weather for viewing or climbing this peak.

Climate data for Upper Rakaia, elevation 1,752 m (5,748 ft), (1991–2020)
Month	Jan	Feb	Mar	Apr	May	Jun	Jul	Aug	Sep	Oct	Nov	Dec	Year
Mean daily maximum °C (°F)	11.0 (51.8)	11.4 (52.5)	10.0 (50.0)	7.4 (45.3)	5.1 (41.2)	3.3 (37.9)	2.2 (36.0)	2.8 (37.0)	3.8 (38.8)	5.1 (41.2)	6.6 (43.9)	9.0 (48.2)	6.5 (43.7)
Daily mean °C (°F)	7.4 (45.3)	7.9 (46.2)	6.5 (43.7)	4.0 (39.2)	2.0 (35.6)	−0.1 (31.8)	−1.3 (29.7)	−0.9 (30.4)	0.0 (32.0)	1.5 (34.7)	3.1 (37.6)	5.6 (42.1)	3.0 (37.4)
Mean daily minimum °C (°F)	3.8 (38.8)	4.4 (39.9)	3.0 (37.4)	0.5 (32.9)	−1.1 (30.0)	−3.5 (25.7)	−4.8 (23.4)	−4.6 (23.7)	−3.7 (25.3)	−2.1 (28.2)	−0.5 (31.1)	2.1 (35.8)	−0.5 (31.0)
Average rainfall mm (inches)	285.4 (11.24)	183.9 (7.24)	177.2 (6.98)	215.1 (8.47)	218.8 (8.61)	131.3 (5.17)	87.0 (3.43)	91.1 (3.59)	143.4 (5.65)	206.6 (8.13)	216.9 (8.54)	244.3 (9.62)	2,201 (86.67)
Source: CliFlo

== Gallery ==
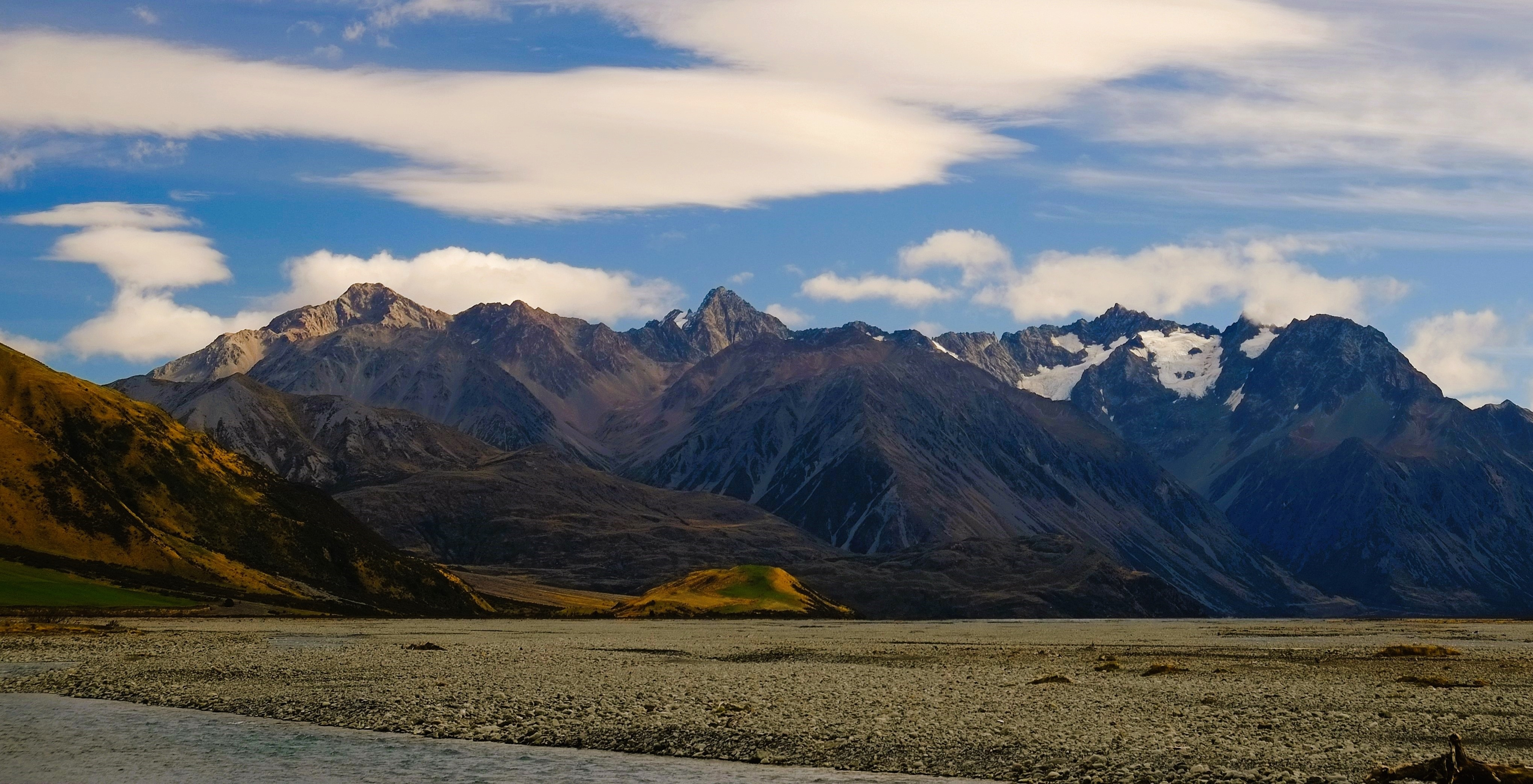
The Marquee to left, Jagged Peak (centre), North Peak (2,628m) to right

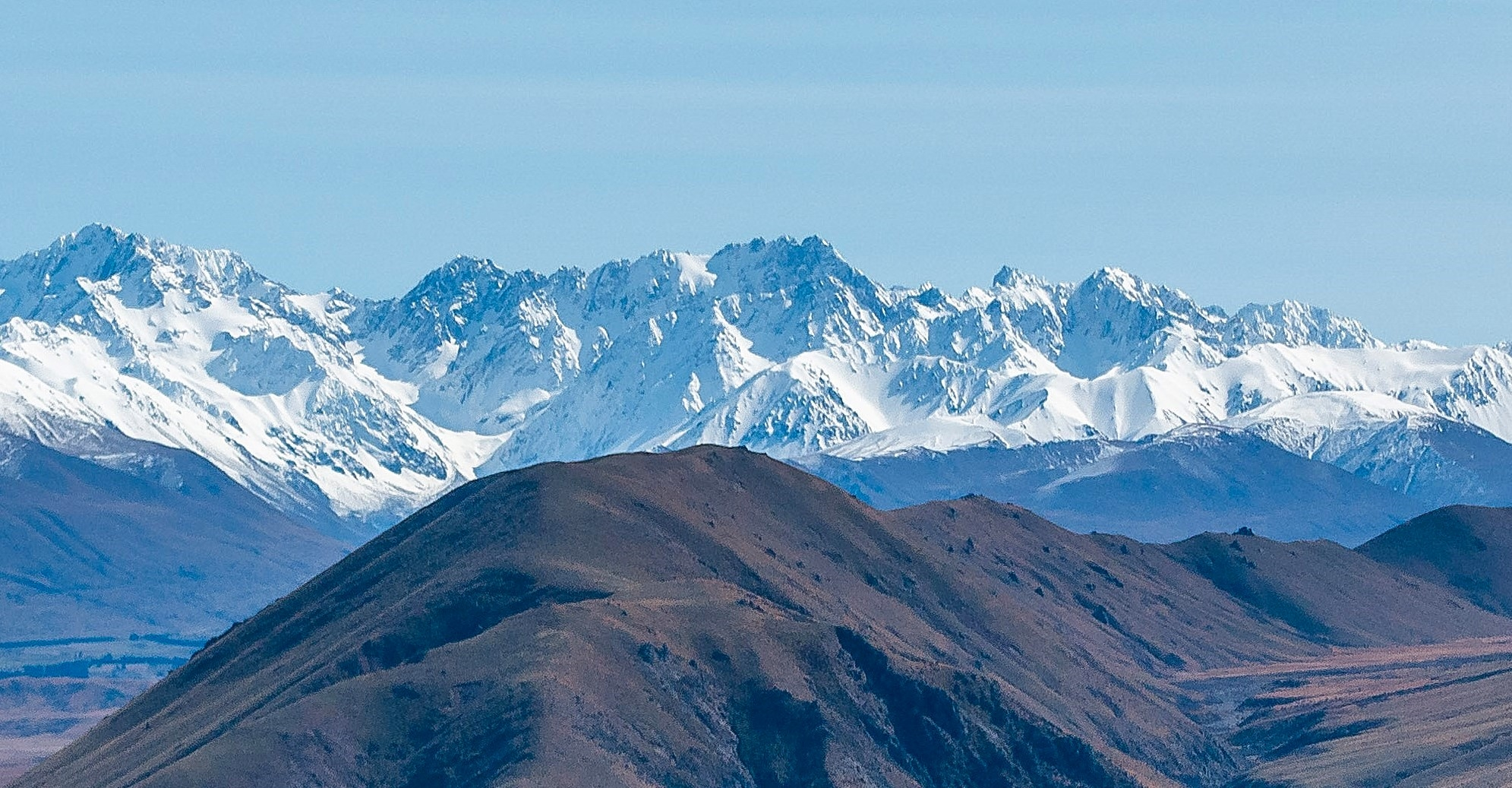
Arrowsmith Range from southwest, The Marquee on skyline to right

== See also ==
- List of mountains of New Zealand by height
