= Harry Ayres (mountaineer) =

New Zealand mountaineer, guide, and gardener

- Born: Horace Henry Ayres; 31 July 1912
- Died: 16 July 1987 (aged 74)
- Citizenship: New Zealand
- Known for: Mountaineering
- Spouses: Catherine May Guise (m. 1939–1948) Jeanne Ette Cammock (m. 1949–1987)

Horace Henry Ayres OBE (31 July 1912 – 16 July 1987), better known as Harry Herbert Ayres and with his surname sometimes spelled Ayers, was a well-known New Zealand mountaineer and guide.

== Early life ==
Ayres was born in Christchurch, New Zealand, on 31 July 1912 to Ellen Matthews and Henry Ayres. He left school at the age of 12 after his mother died. He then worked on some farms, railroads and roadways.

== Mountaineering ==
In 1931, Ayres was introduced to mountaineering by Frank Alack. After five years, Ayres became a guide at the Tongariro National Park. In 1937, he made his first ascent of Aoraki / Mount Cook. He later became the chief ranger at the Mount Cook National Park Board. Ayres was a mentor to Edmund Hillary, who had proposed him to Eric Shipton as a member of the 1953 British Mount Everest expedition.

He fought in WWII in the Pacific from 1942 to 1944 where he contracted tropical diseases that affected his health significantly.

From 1945 to 1955 he made 9 ascents of Mount Cook and Mount Tasman including leading Edmund Hillary and Ruth Adams in 1948.

In 1956, Ayres traveled to Antarctica with the New Zealand party of the Trans-Antarctic Expedition.

In the 1981 New Year Honours, Ayres was appointed an Officer of the Order of the British Empire, for services to mountaineering.

Ayres Ridge, between Mount Haidinger and Douglas Peak, is named after Ayres.

== Personal life ==
He married Catherine May Guise in 1939. In 1948 they divorced and he married Jeanne Ette Cammock in 1949. They had three children. In 1987, Ayres went missing to be found drowned in Lyttelton Harbour / Whakaraupō from expected suicide.
