= Red Peak =

Red Peak may refer to:

- Red Peak (El Dorado County, California),
- Red Peak (Madera County, California)
- Red Peak (New Zealand)
- Red Peak flag, a proposed New Zealand flag
- Red Peak Formation, a geologic formation in Wyoming
