= Malcolm Peak =

Mountain in New Zealand

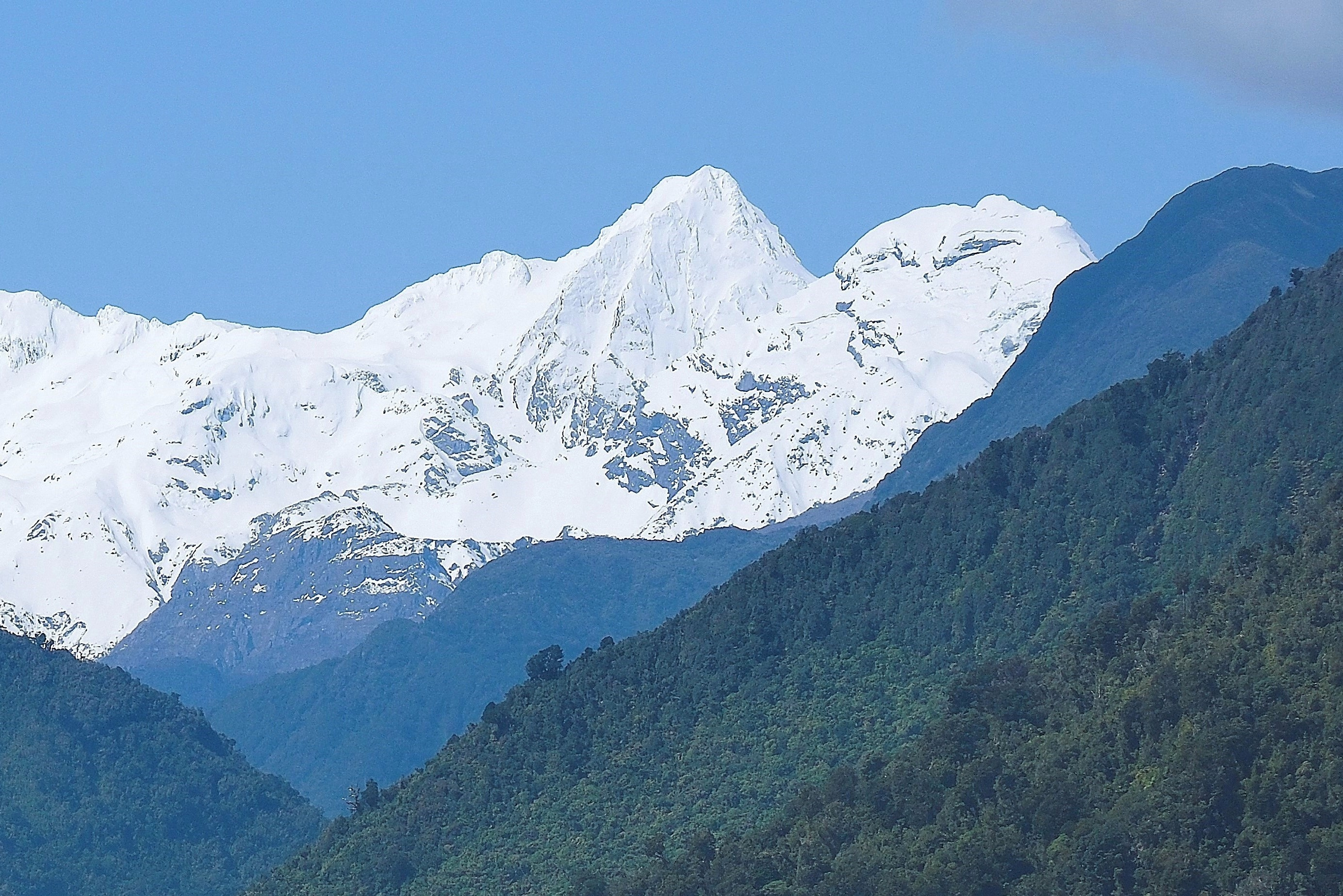
- Northwest aspect centred

Highest point
- Elevation: 2,512 m (8,241 ft)
- Prominence: 526 m (1,726 ft)
- Parent peak: The Warrior
- Isolation: 5.28 km (3.28 mi)
- Listing: New Zealand #69
- Coordinates: 43°17′59″S 170°49′01″E

Naming
- Etymology: Malcom Ross

Geography
- Location within New Zealand
- Interactive map of Malcolm Peak
- Location: South Island
- Country: New Zealand
- Region: West Coast / Canterbury
- District: Westland / Ashburton
- Parent range: Southern Alps
- Topo map(s): NZMS260 J35; Topo50 BW18

Geology
- Rock type: Greywacke

Climbing
- First ascent: 1911

Malcolm Peak is a mountain on the shared border of the West Coast and Canterbury Regions of New Zealand.

== Description ==
Malcolm Peak is a 2,512-metre-elevation (8,241-foot) summit situated on the crest of the Southern Alps in the South Island. Precipitation runoff from the mountain drains northwest to the Wanganui River via the Lambert River, and east into the headwaters of the Rakaia River. Topographic relief is significant as the summit rises 1,000 metres (3,281 feet) above the Lyell Glacier in one kilometre. The nearest higher neighbour is The Warrior, five kilometres to the south-southeast. The mountain's toponym honours journalist and mountaineer Malcom Ross (1862–1930), a co-founder of the New Zealand Alpine Club in 1891. His wife Forrestina Ross was a fellow mountaineer and journalist and together they helped popularise mountaineering in New Zealand. The toponym has appeared in publications since 1911.

== Climbing ==
The first ascent of the summit was accomplished on 8 March 1911 by Ebenezer Teichelmann, Peter Graham, and Jack Clarke via the West Ridge.

Established climbing routes with first ascents:

- West Ridge – Ebenezer Teichelmann, Peter Graham, Jack Clarke – (1911)
- Northeast Ridge – H.W. (Sandy) Cormack, Lloyd Wilson – (1933)
- Southwest Ridge (descent) – Andy Anderson, Bruce Turner, Jack Hayes – (1934)
- East Buttress – Stan Conway, Alan Barnes, Syd Brookes – (1937)
- Southeast Rib – Ambrose Banfield, Arthur Lees, Bruce Banfield – (1939)
- Northwest Face – Guy McKinnon – (2006)
- East Face – Ryan Nicol, Yossi Jagger – (2015)
- North Spur

== Climate ==
Based on the Köppen climate classification, Malcolm Peak is located in a marine west coast (Cfb) climate zone. Prevailing westerly winds blow moist air from the Tasman Sea onto the mountains, where the air is forced upward by the mountains (orographic lift), causing moisture to fall in the form of rain or snow. This climate supports the Lyell Glacier on the southern slope of the peak and the Malcolm Glacier on the north slope. The months of December through February offer the most favourable weather for viewing or climbing this peak.

== Gallery ==
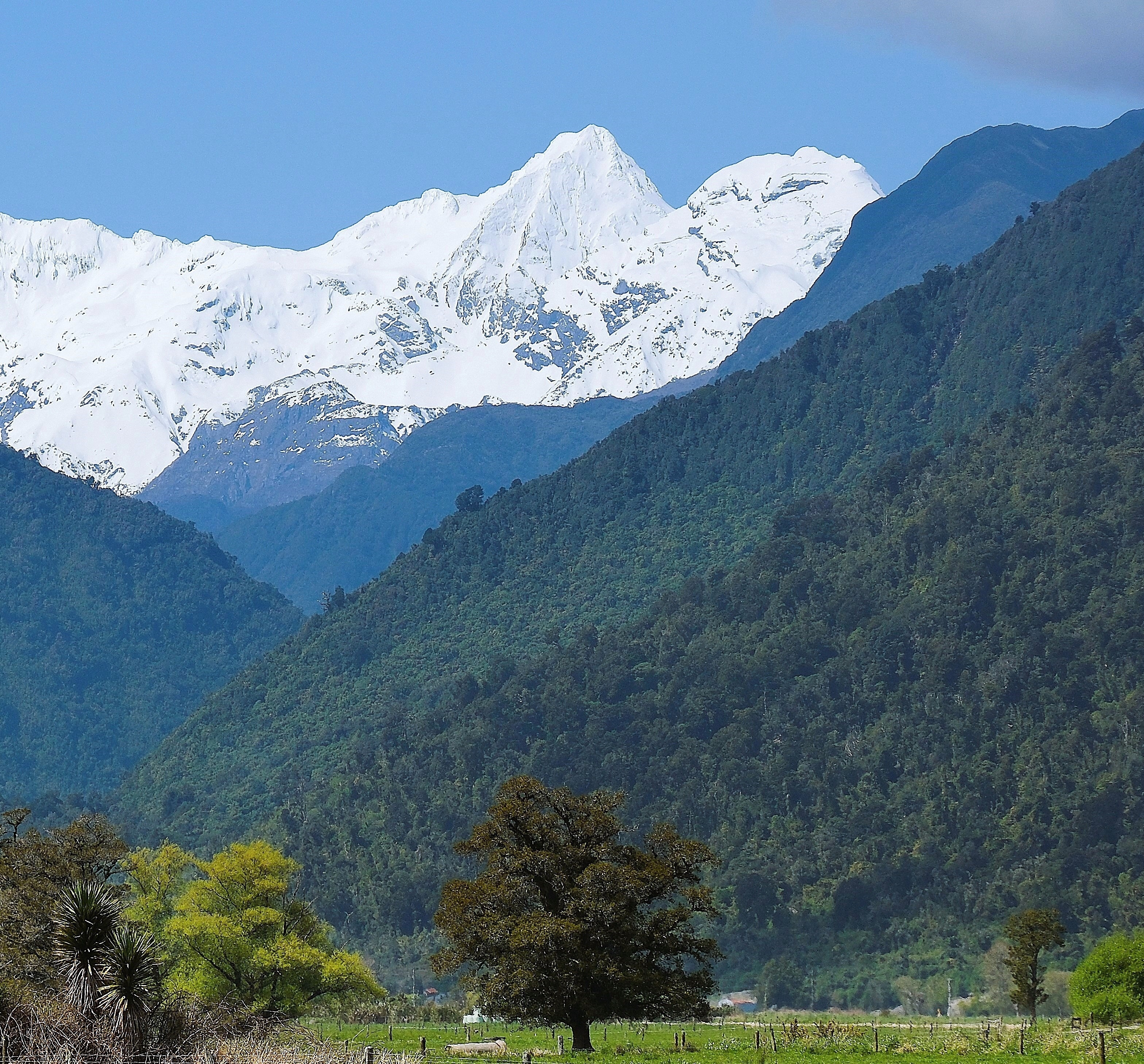
Northwest aspect of Malcolm Peak centred with Mt. Stoddart to right, viewed from near Hari Hari

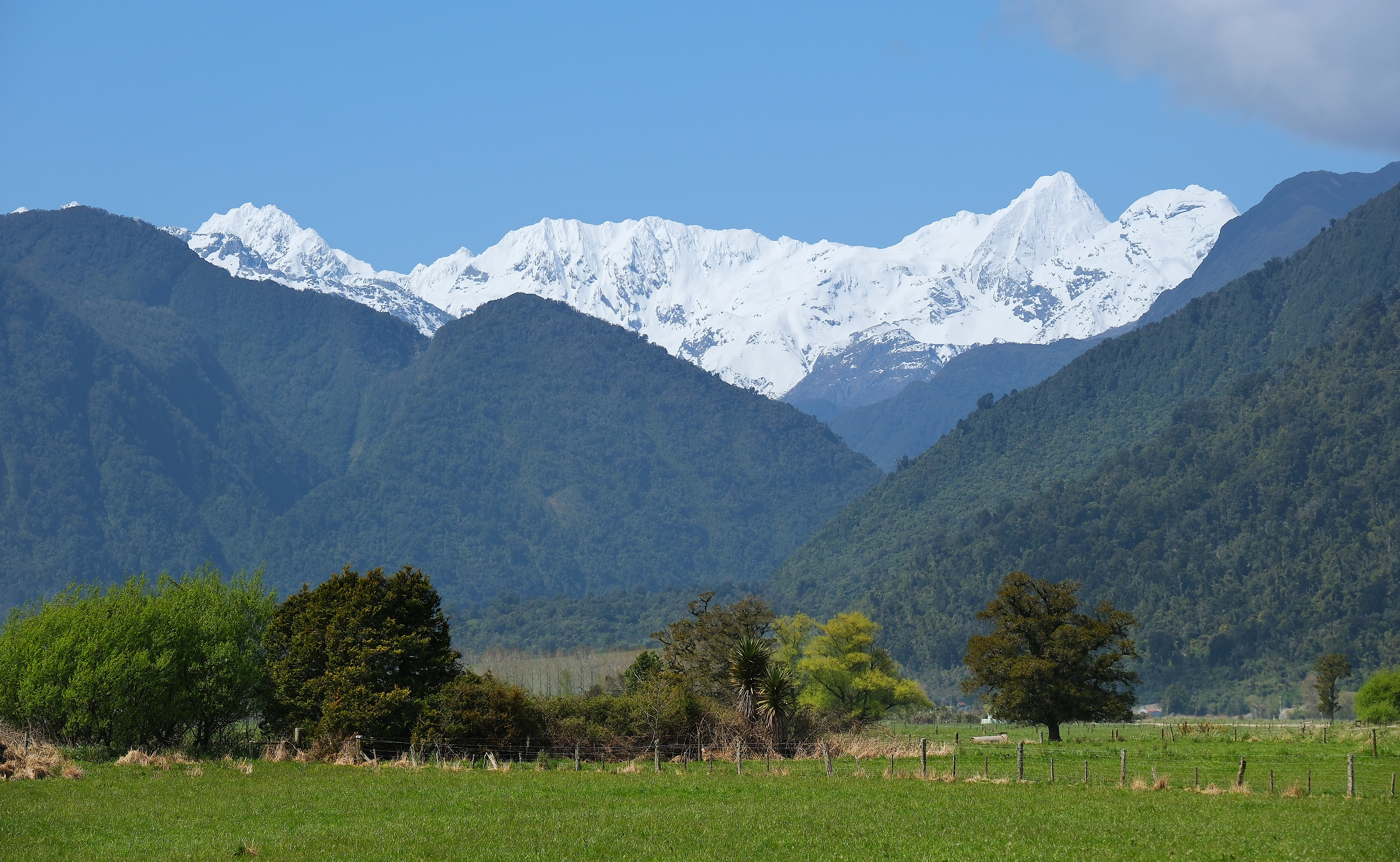
Blair Peak, Hidden Peak, Malcolm Peak, Mount Stoddart viewed from near Hari Hari

== See also ==
- List of mountains of New Zealand by height
