= Glacier Peak (New Zealand) =

Mountain in New Zealand

- Location within New Zealand

Highest point
- Elevation: 3,002 m (9,849 ft)
- Listing: List of mountains of New Zealand by height
- Coordinates: 43°32′17″S 170°12′35″E

Geography
- Location: Canterbury, New Zealand

Glacier Peak is a mountain located in the Southern Alps, in the South Island of New Zealand.

== History ==
Glacier Peak originally appeared in 1884 under the name Kant on a map by Robert Lendlmayer von Lendenfeld, but as early as 1891 under its current name on a map by Malcolm Ross. The first ascent was made on the morning of 27 January 1907 by mountaineers Ebenezer Teichelmann, Alexander Graham and Henry Edward Newton from the west over the northern shoulder.

== Geography ==
Glacier Peak is less than a kilometer northeast of the 3077 m high Douglas Peak, which in turn is only about a kilometer north of the 3070 m high Mount Haidinger. The next three-thousander north of Glacier Peak are the 3040 m high The Minarets several kilometers to the northeast. On the southeast flank is Forrest Ross Glacier, which leads to Tasman Glacier, and on the northwest flank is Explorer Glacier, which leads to Fox Glacier.

== Geology ==
The rock consists mainly of variants of the sedimentary rocks of sandstone, siltstone and mudstone, approximately 201 to 253 million years old.
