= Blair Peak (New Zealand) =

Mountain in New Zealand

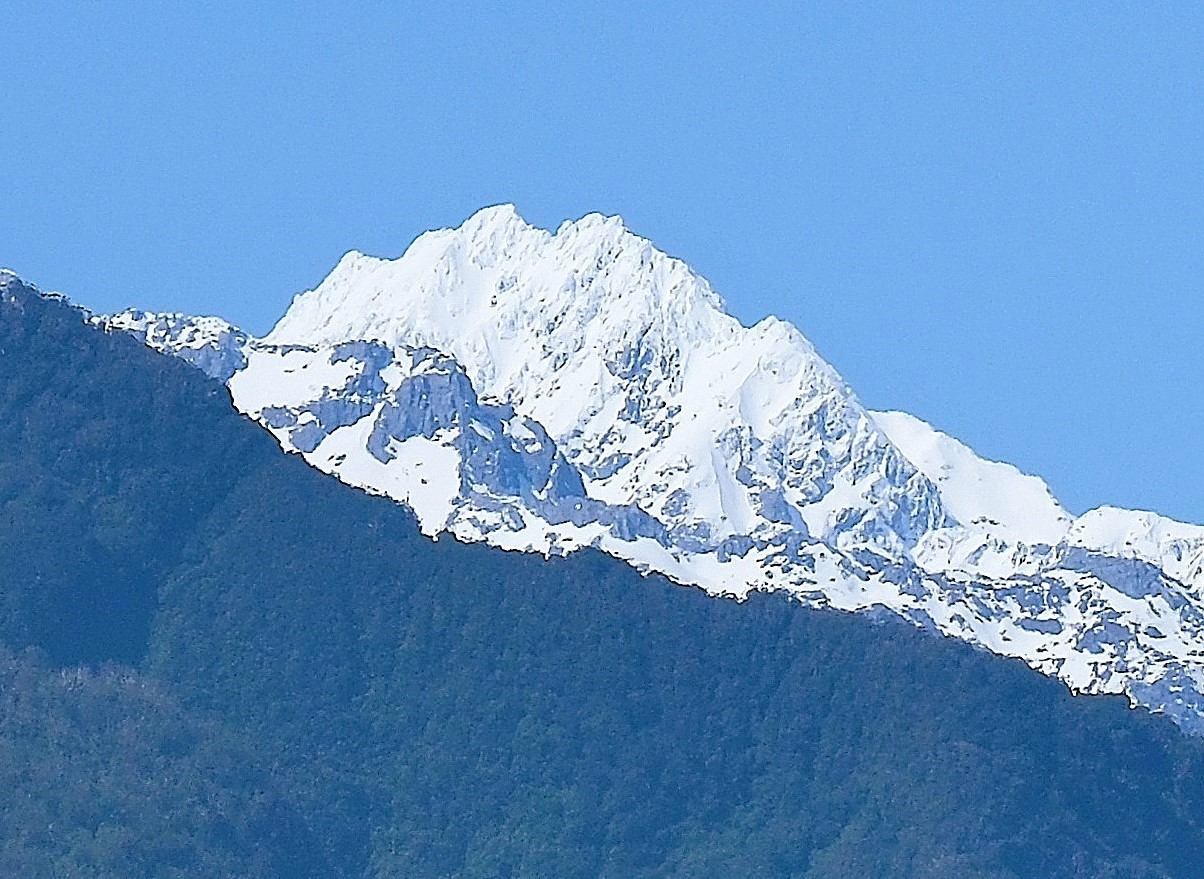
- Northwest aspect

Highest point
- Elevation: 2,486 m (8,156 ft)
- Prominence: 409 m (1,342 ft)
- Parent peak: Malcolm Peak
- Isolation: 3.68 km (2.29 mi)
- Listing: New Zealand #78
- Coordinates: 43°16′55″S 170°51′18″E

Geography
- Location within New Zealand
- Interactive map of Blair Peak
- Location: South Island
- Country: New Zealand
- Region: West Coast / Canterbury
- District: Westland / Ashburton
- Parent range: Southern Alps
- Topo map(s): NZMS260 J35; Topo50 BW18

Geology
- Rock type: Greywacke

Climbing
- First ascent: 1932

Blair Peak is a mountain on the shared border of the West Coast and Canterbury Regions of New Zealand.

== Description ==
Blair Peak is a 2,486-metre-elevation (8,156-foot) summit situated on the crest of the Southern Alps in the South Island. Precipitation runoff from the mountain drains north to the Lord River, and south into the headwaters of the Rakaia River. Topographic relief is significant as the summit rises 800 metres (2,625 feet) above the Radiant Glacier in one kilometre and 1,000 metres (3,281 feet) above the Cockayne Glacier in one kilometre. The nearest higher neighbour is Malcolm Peak, 3.66 kilometres to the southwest. The mountain's toponym has appeared in publications since 1911.

== Climbing ==
Established climbing routes with first ascents:

- South Ridge – H.W. (Sandy) Cormack, Lloyd Wilson, Sidney (Archie) Wiren – (1932)
- North Ridge – Paul Richardson, Roger Redmayne, Trevor Bissell, Tony Gazely – (1986)
- Via the Radiant Glacier (descent) – Paul Richardson, Roger Redmayne, Trevor Bissell, Tony Gazely – (1986)
- West Ridge

== Climate ==
Based on the Köppen climate classification, Blair Peak is located in a marine west coast (Cfb) climate zone. Prevailing westerly winds blow moist air from the Tasman Sea onto the mountains, where the air is forced upward by the mountains (orographic lift), causing moisture to fall in the form of rain or snow. This climate supports the Radiant Glacier on the northern slope of the peak, Cockayne Glacier on the southeast slope, and the Heim Plateau on the southwest slope. The months of December through February offer the most favourable weather for viewing or climbing this peak.

== Gallery ==
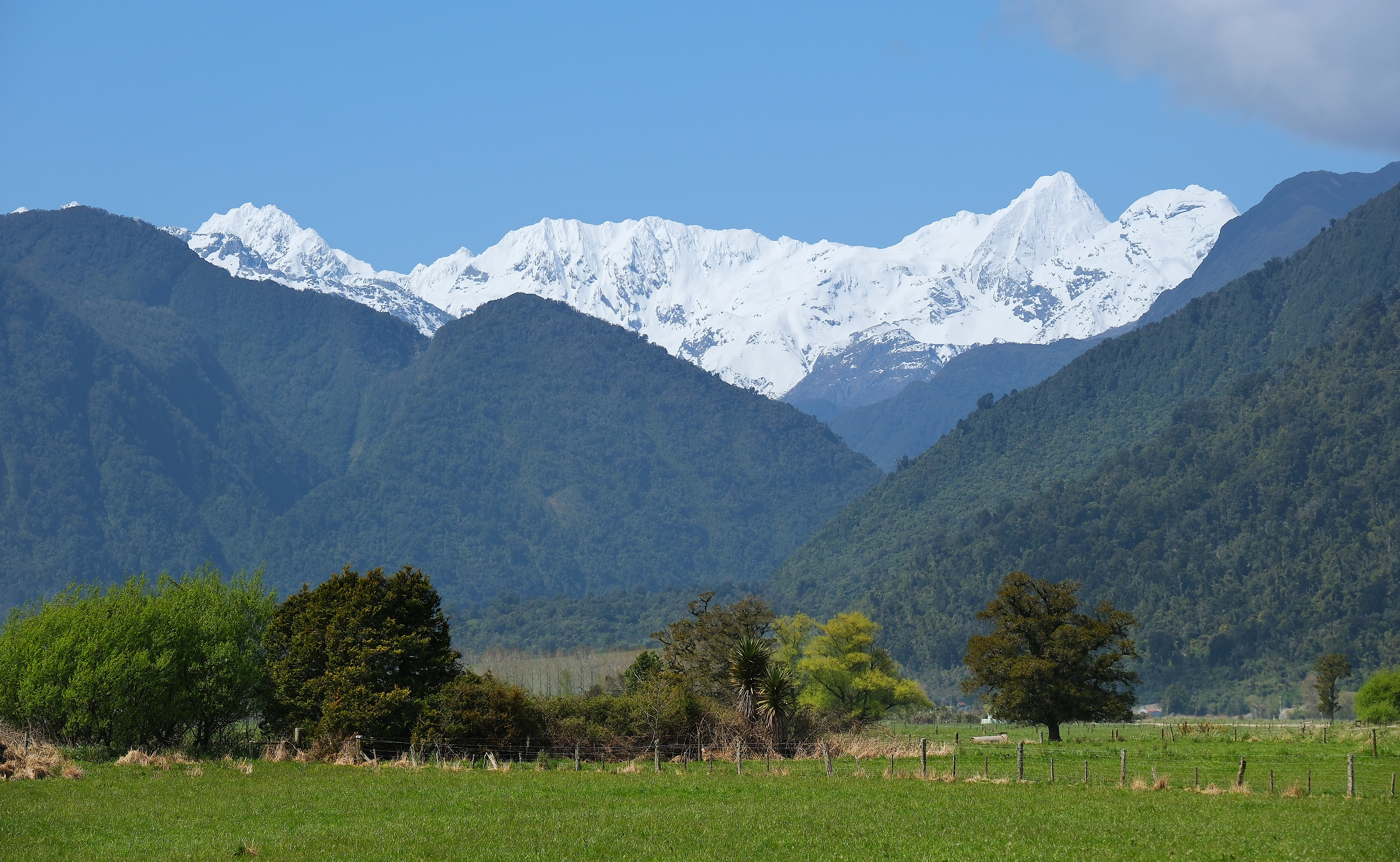
Blair Peak, Hidden Peak, Malcolm Peak, Mount Stoddart from near Hari Hari

== See also ==
- List of mountains of New Zealand by height
- William Newsham Blair
