= North Peak (Canterbury) =

Mountain in the Canterbury Region of New Zealand

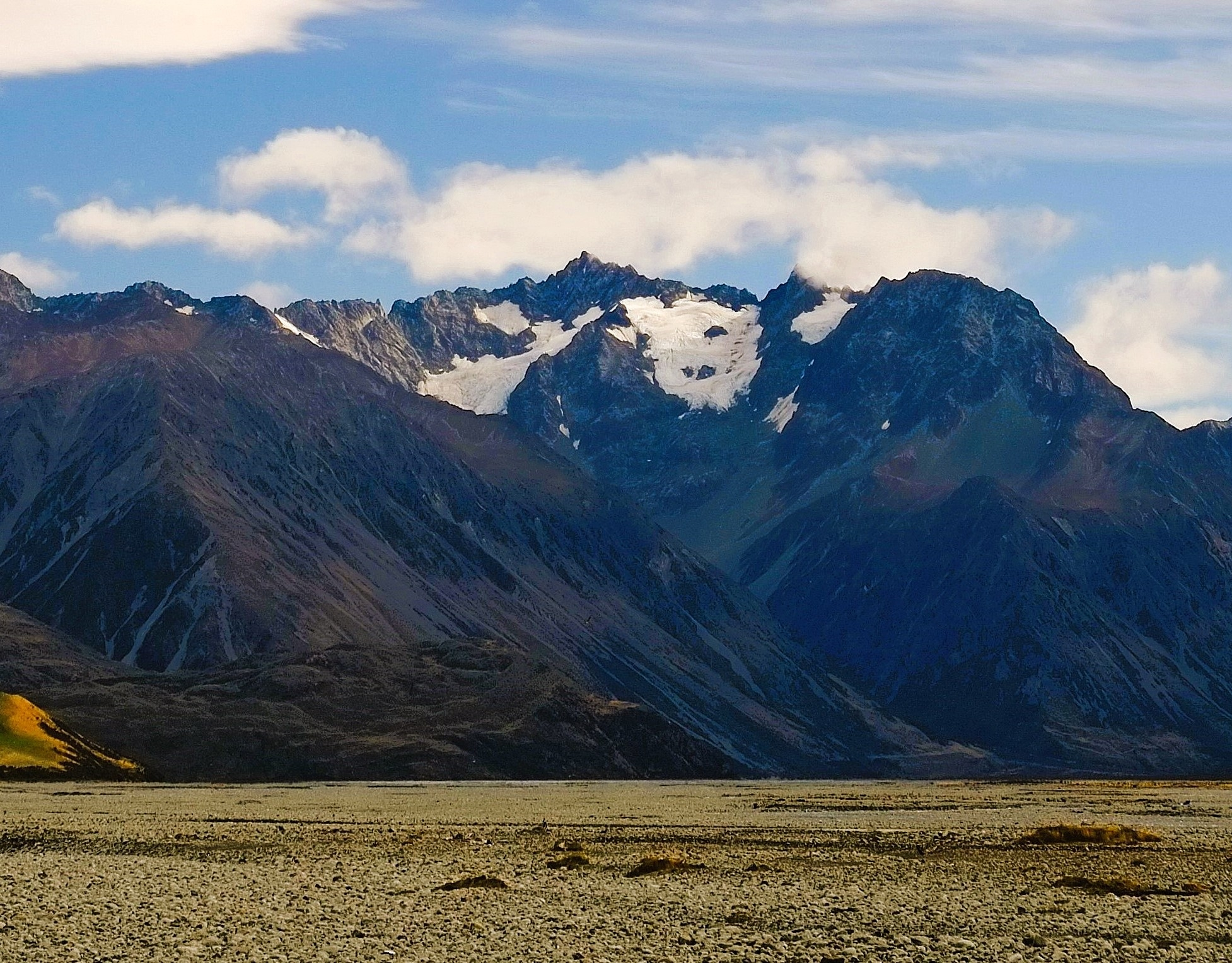
- East aspect

Highest point
- Elevation: 2,628 m (8,622 ft)
- Prominence: 248 m (814 ft)
- Isolation: 1.03 km (0.64 mi)
- Coordinates: 43.31218°S 171.00314°E

Geography
- Location within New Zealand
- Interactive map of North Peak
- Location: South Island
- Country: New Zealand
- Region: Canterbury
- Parent range: Southern Alps; Jollie Range
- Topo map: Topo50 BW18

Geology
- Rock age: Triassic
- Rock type: Rakaia Terrane

Climbing
- First ascent: 1932

North Peak is a 2,628-metre-elevation (8,622-foot) mountain in the Canterbury Region of New Zealand.

== Description ==
North Peak is located 122 kilometres (76 mi) west of Christchurch in the South Island. It is set at the eastern end of the Jollie Range of the Southern Alps. Precipitation runoff from the mountain's southwest slope drains into the headwaters of the Lawrence River, whereas all other slopes drain into Jagged Stream and Reischek Stream which are both tributaries of the Rakaia River. Topographic relief is significant as the summit rises 728 metres (2,388 feet) above the Lawrence Glacier in one-half kilometre. The nearest higher peak is Red Peak, one kilometre to the west. New Zealand mountaineer Guy Mannering (1862–1947) applied the toponym on 16 May 1893 because the peak is situated at the northernmost tip of the Arrowsmith Range. The mountain's toponym has been officially approved by the New Zealand Geographic Board.

== Climbing ==
Climbing routes with first ascents:

- East Couloir – Evan Wilson, Doug Brough – (1932)
- North West Buttress – H.W. (Sandy) Cormack, Lloyd Wilson – (1932)
- North Ridge – Bruce Banfield, Bob Logan – (1939)
- Cousins-Harrison – John Cousins, Bruce Harrison – (1962)
- West Ridge – Dave Gobey, R.D. (Dave) Clark – (1969)
- South Ridge – Margaret Clark, D. Roberts, H. Wills, R. Wills – (1970)
- North West Face – Lindsay Main – (1977)

== Climate ==
Based on the Köppen climate classification, North Peak is located in a marine west coast (Cfb) climate zone, with a subpolar oceanic climate (Cfc) at the summit. Prevailing westerly winds blow moist air from the Tasman Sea onto the mountains, where the air is forced upwards by the mountains (orographic lift), causing moisture to drop in the form of rain or snow. This climate supports the Lawrence, Reischek, Assault, and Gridiron glaciers on the slopes of this peak. The months of December through February offer the most favourable weather for viewing or climbing this peak.

Climate data for Upper Rakaia, elevation 1,752 m (5,748 ft), (1991–2020)
Month	Jan	Feb	Mar	Apr	May	Jun	Jul	Aug	Sep	Oct	Nov	Dec	Year
Mean daily maximum °C (°F)	11.0 (51.8)	11.4 (52.5)	10.0 (50.0)	7.4 (45.3)	5.1 (41.2)	3.3 (37.9)	2.2 (36.0)	2.8 (37.0)	3.8 (38.8)	5.1 (41.2)	6.6 (43.9)	9.0 (48.2)	6.5 (43.7)
Daily mean °C (°F)	7.4 (45.3)	7.9 (46.2)	6.5 (43.7)	4.0 (39.2)	2.0 (35.6)	−0.1 (31.8)	−1.3 (29.7)	−0.9 (30.4)	0.0 (32.0)	1.5 (34.7)	3.1 (37.6)	5.6 (42.1)	3.0 (37.4)
Mean daily minimum °C (°F)	3.8 (38.8)	4.4 (39.9)	3.0 (37.4)	0.5 (32.9)	−1.1 (30.0)	−3.5 (25.7)	−4.8 (23.4)	−4.6 (23.7)	−3.7 (25.3)	−2.1 (28.2)	−0.5 (31.1)	2.1 (35.8)	−0.5 (31.0)
Average rainfall mm (inches)	285.4 (11.24)	183.9 (7.24)	177.2 (6.98)	215.1 (8.47)	218.8 (8.61)	131.3 (5.17)	87.0 (3.43)	91.1 (3.59)	143.4 (5.65)	206.6 (8.13)	216.9 (8.54)	244.3 (9.62)	2,201 (86.67)
Source: CliFlo

== Gallery ==
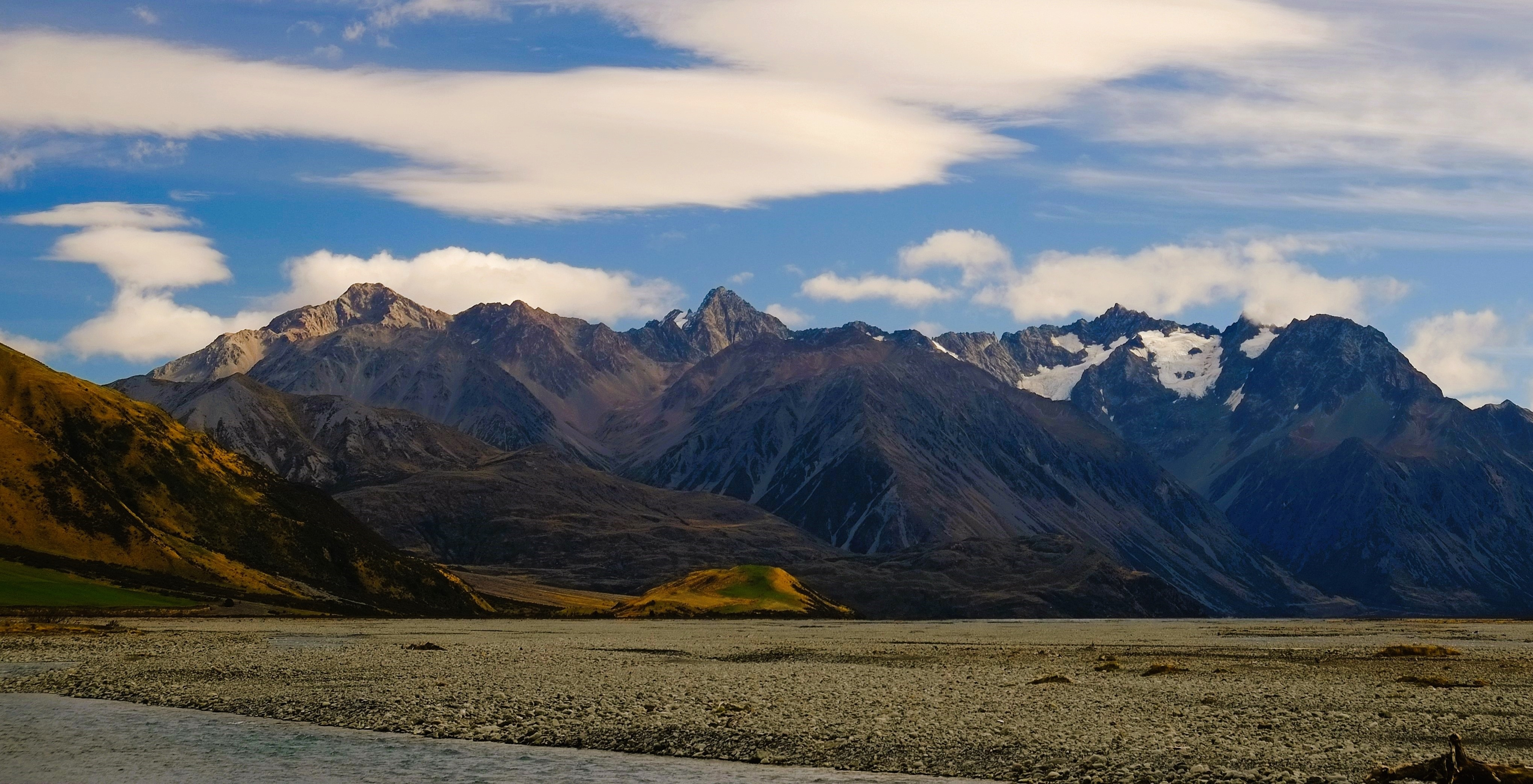
The Marquee to left, Jagged Peak (centre), North Peak to right

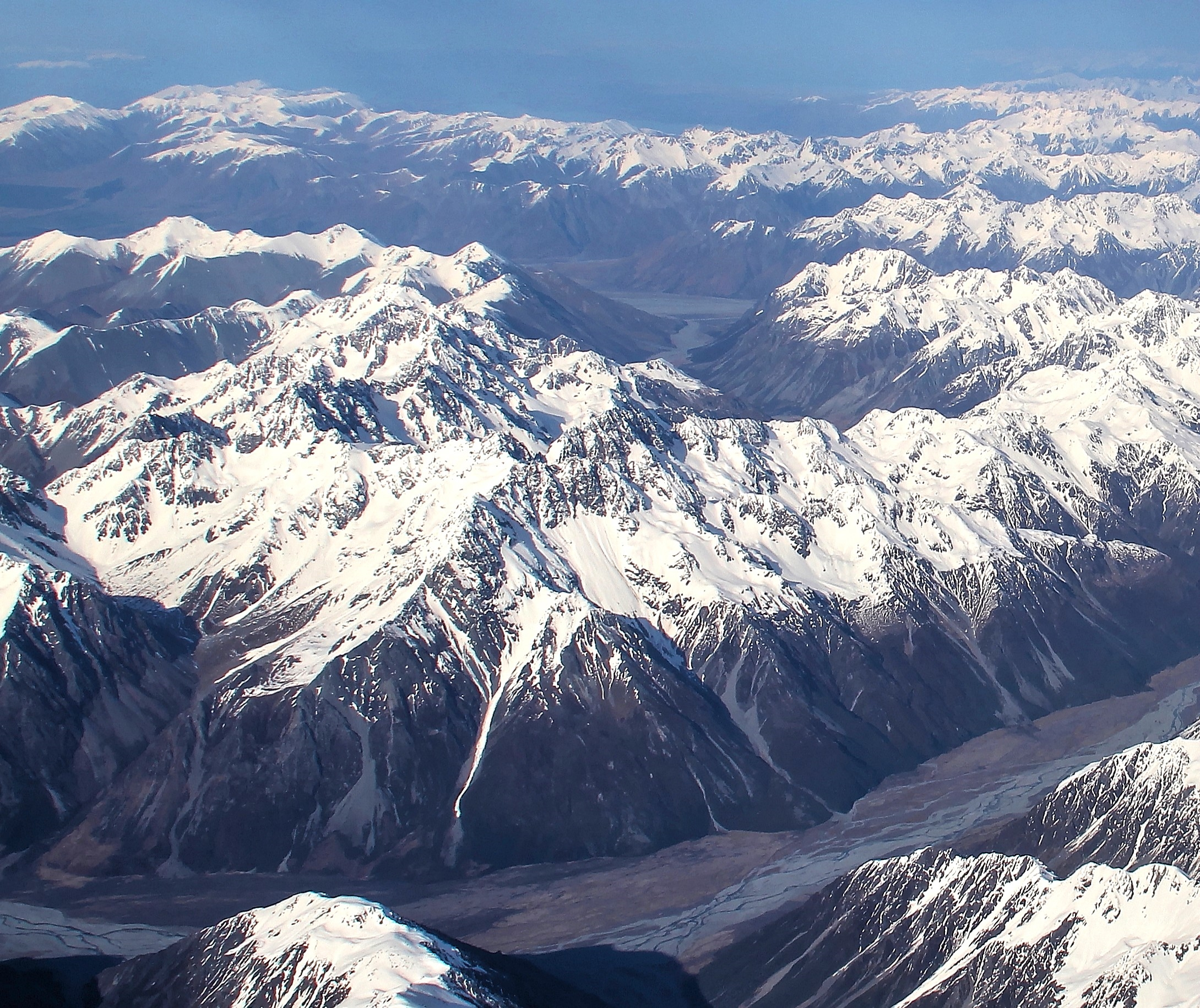
Aerial view of Red Peak centred with North Peak immediately to left

== See also ==
- List of mountains of New Zealand by height
