= Forrest Ross =

New Zealand teacher, mountaineer, journalist and writer

Forrestina Elizabeth Ross (23 June 1860 – 29 March 1936) was a notable New Zealand teacher, mountaineer, journalist and writer. She was born in Brixton, Surrey, England, in 1860. She was married to Malcolm Ross.

Forrest was the first female member of the New Zealand Alpine Club.

The Forrest Ross Glacier was named after her.

== Career ==
In May 1878, Forrest Grant served as an assistant teacher at Tokomairiro High School, then went on to train at the Normal School, Dunedin, for a year. She later studied at the University of Otago. In 1881 she was appointed to a teaching position at Forbury School, and subsequently taught English for a number of years at Otago Girls' High School. She resigned in 1890 on her marriage to Malcolm Ross.

The family moved to Wellington in 1897 where Ross became a parliamentary reporter. She was appointed as the first female editor of the Evening Post where she edited what were then called the "Ladies' pages".
