= Tokomairiro High School =

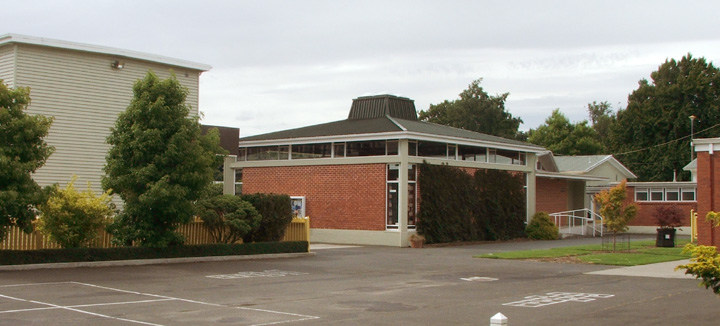

Location
- 238 Union Street; Milton, 9220; New Zealand; 46°06′48″S 169°57′56″E

Information
- Type: Co-educational state secondary
- Motto: Latin: Disciplina moderatio comitas (Discipline moderation kindness)
- Established: 1856; 170 years ago
- Ministry of Education Institution no.: 392
- Chairperson: Darlene Adams
- Principal: Vicki Wish
- Enrolment: 200 (July 2026)
- Socio-economic decile: 4K
- Website: www.tokohigh.school.nz

Tokomairiro High School is a co-educational, state secondary school in Milton, New Zealand, often simply known as "Toko".

== History ==
Founded in 1856 as Tokomairiro School, it is one of New Zealand's oldest schools. It was originally established at Fairfax (now Tokoiti) in the southeast of Milton, with Alexander Ayson as the first teacher. As Milton grew in size due to the Otago gold rush in the early 1860s, a larger school was soon needed. This was erected close to the centre of Milton in Spenser Street in 1863. In 1868, the Otago Provincial Government named Toko as one of the province's four grammar schools.

By the late 1870s, the school had swollen in size from its original 24 pupils to over 300. A new building was needed, as the Spenser Street site had been made to accommodate only some 200 children. The new school, on the present site at the north end of Union Street, was opened in 1880. The current school buildings were added to this stone building during the mid 20th century, and "the old stone school" erected in 1880 was finally demolished in 1970.

During the 1880s, the school moved towards a more technical and scientific curriculum. The school's headmaster (its fourth) James Reid, was a keen student of chemistry, and technical subjects taught ranged from the "pure" sciences to agricultural studies and woodworking. Reid was headmaster for 26 years, from 1880 to 1906.

During the 1930s, the school officially became a District High School. This was finally split into the current Tokomairiro High School (with intermediate and secondary classes) and Milton Primary School in 1966. Most of the current school buildings date from around or after this.

== Enrolment ==
As of July 2026, the school has roll of 200 students, of whom 49 (24.5%) identify as Māori.

As of 2026, the school has an Equity Index of 500, placing it amongst schools whose students have many socioeconomic barriers to achievement (roughly equivalent to deciles 2 and 3 under the former socio-economic decile system).

== Notable staff ==
- Leonard Cockayne – botanist
- Forrest Ross – mountaineer, journalist, writer

== Notable alumni ==
- Ken Bloxham – rugby union player
- Hilary Halba – actress and drama teacher
- Samantha Hayes – news reader
- Diana Noonan – children's author
- Guy Scholefield – historian, librarian
