= Douglas Peak (New Zealand) =

Mountain in New Zealand

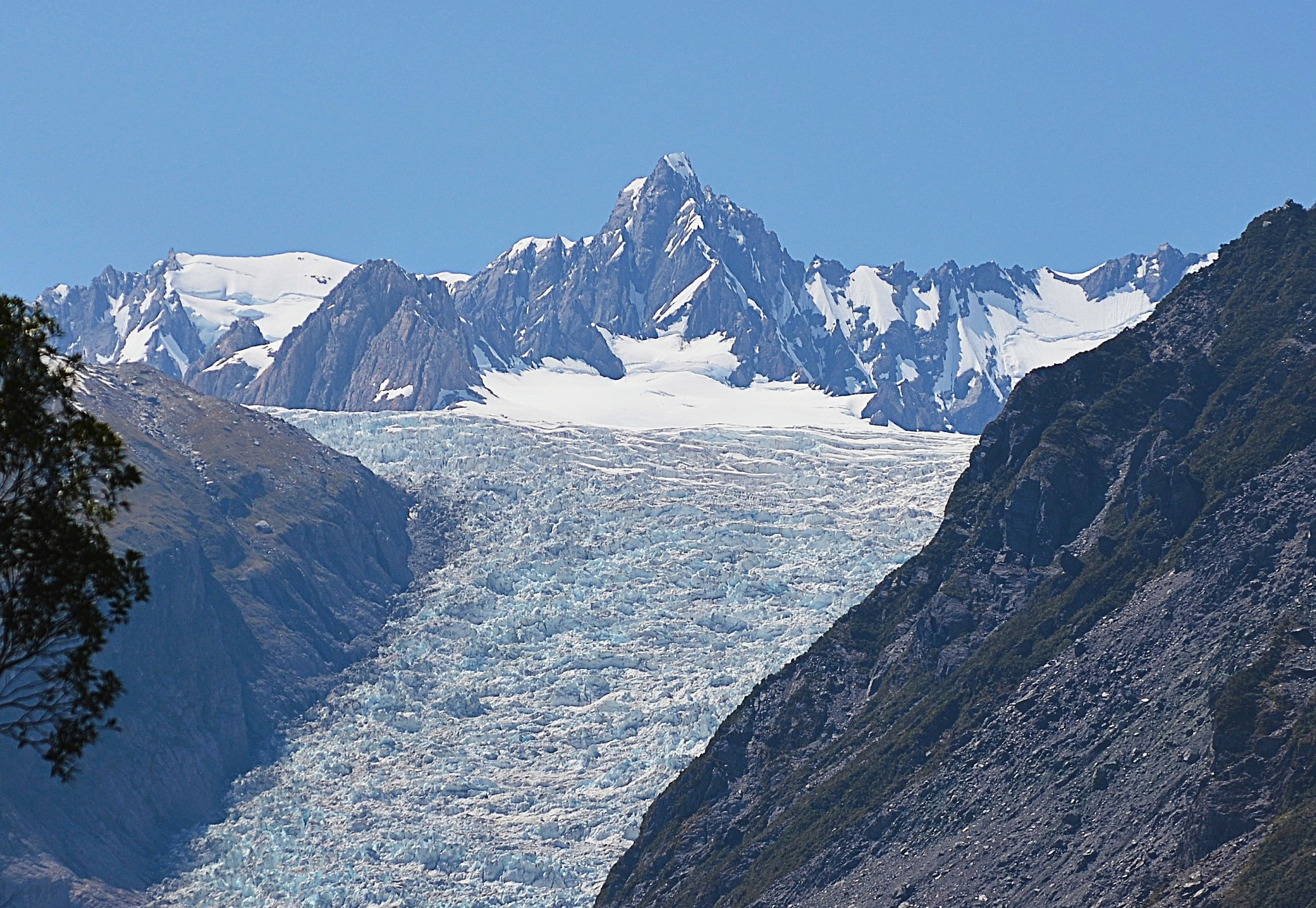
- West aspect of Douglas Peak, with Fox Glacier

Highest point
- Elevation: 3,077 m (10,095 ft)
- Listing: New Zealand #7
- Coordinates: 43°32′30″S 170°12′09″E

Geography
- Location within New Zealand
- Location: South Island, New Zealand
- Parent range: Southern Alps

Douglas Peak is a 3,077 metres (10,095 ft) high mountain in the Southern Alps on the South Island of New Zealand. It is located few kilometres northeast of the second highest mountain of the country, the 3,497 metres (11,473 ft) high Mount Tasman. The mountain lies in between the Three-thousanders Mount Haidinger in the south and Glacier Peak northeast. To the west are tributary glaciers of the Fox Glacier, to the east tributaries of the Tasman Glacier.

The mountain's peak forms part of the border between New Zealand's West Coast and Canterbury Regions.

== Gallery ==
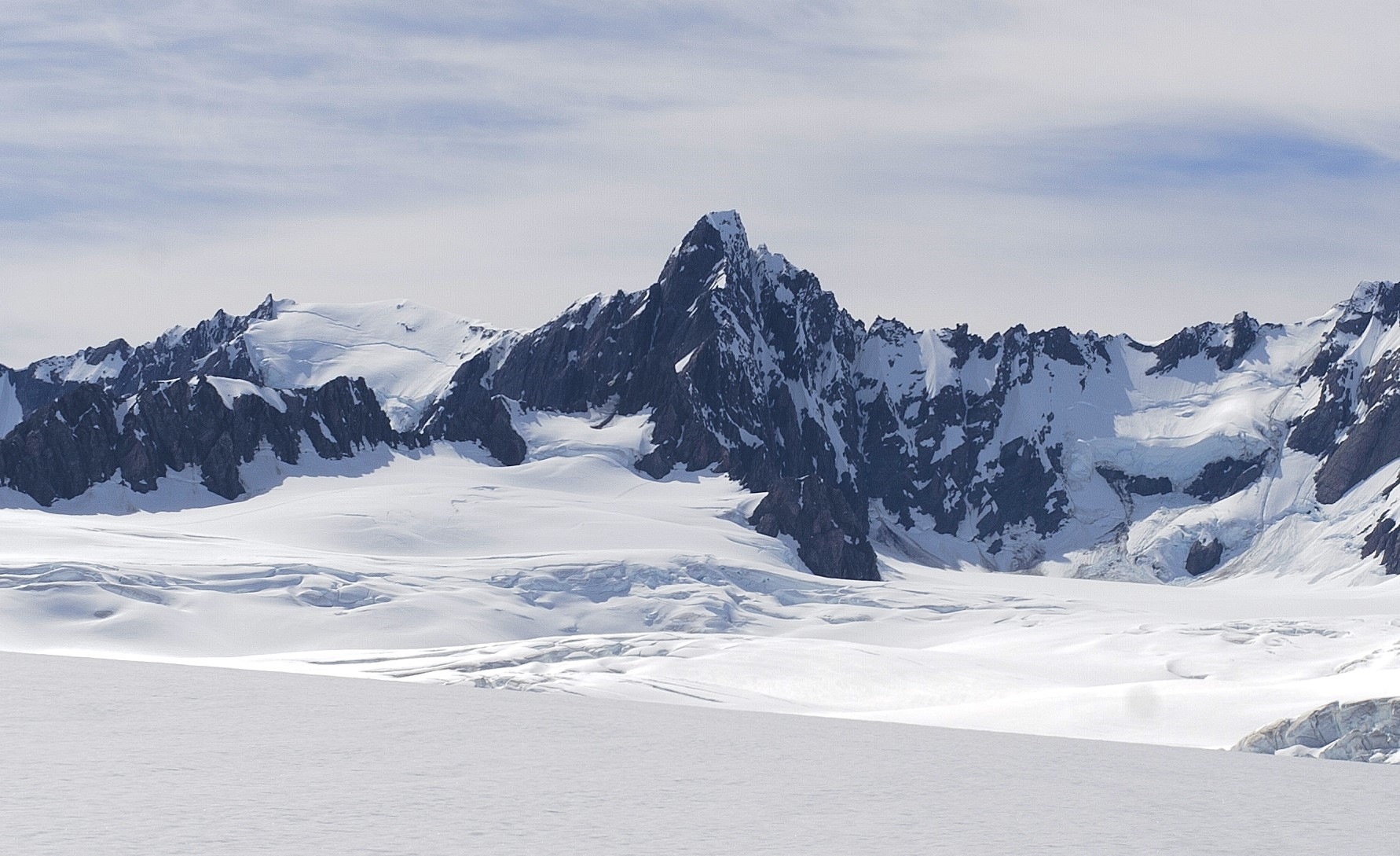
West aspect of Douglas Peak

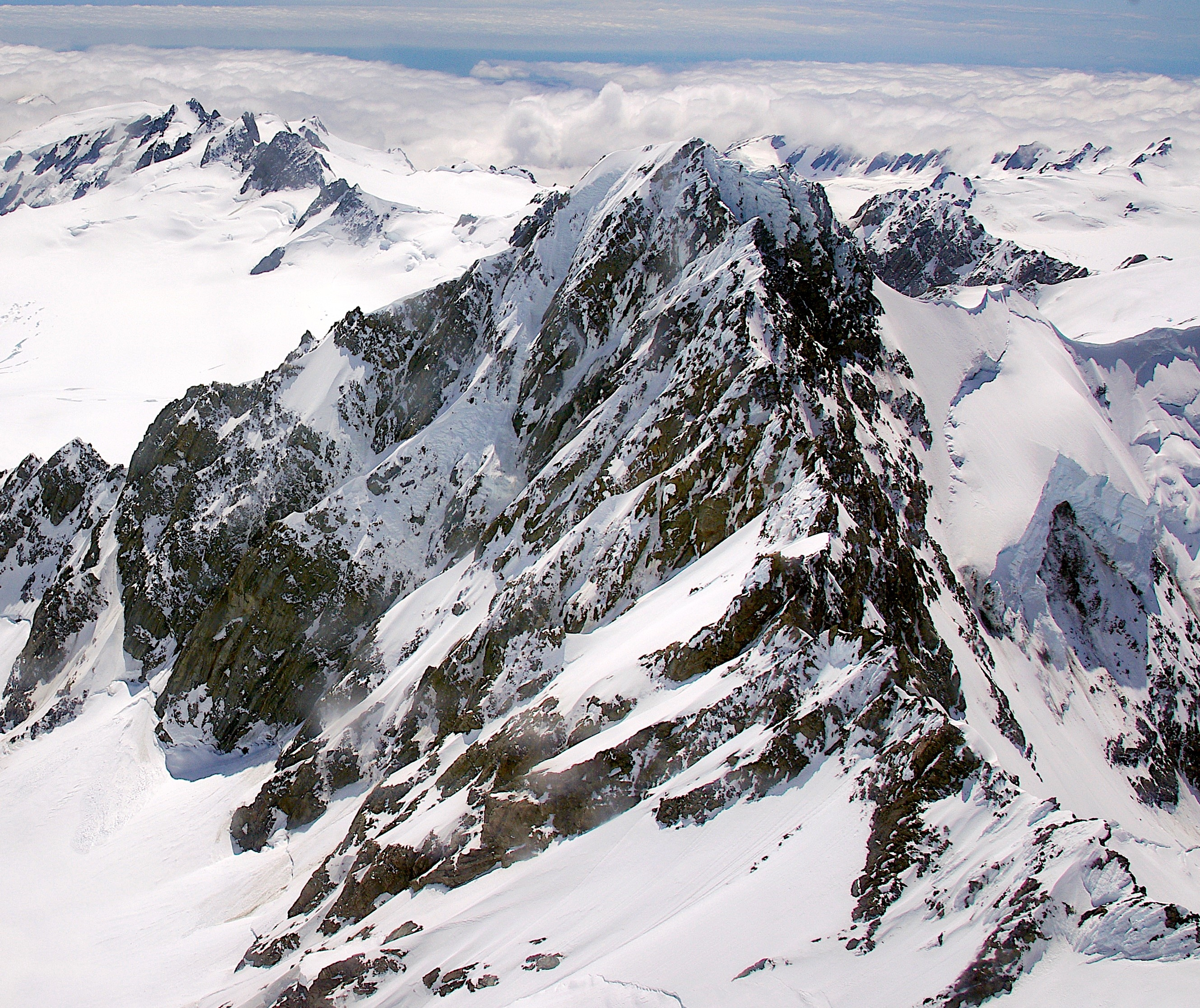
Aerial view of Douglas Peak from southeast

Douglas Peak above Fox Glacier

File:Westland landscapes feat. Fox Glacier - Te Moeka o Tuawe - WestlandLandscapes10042.jpg
