= Jagged Peak =

Mountain in New Zealand

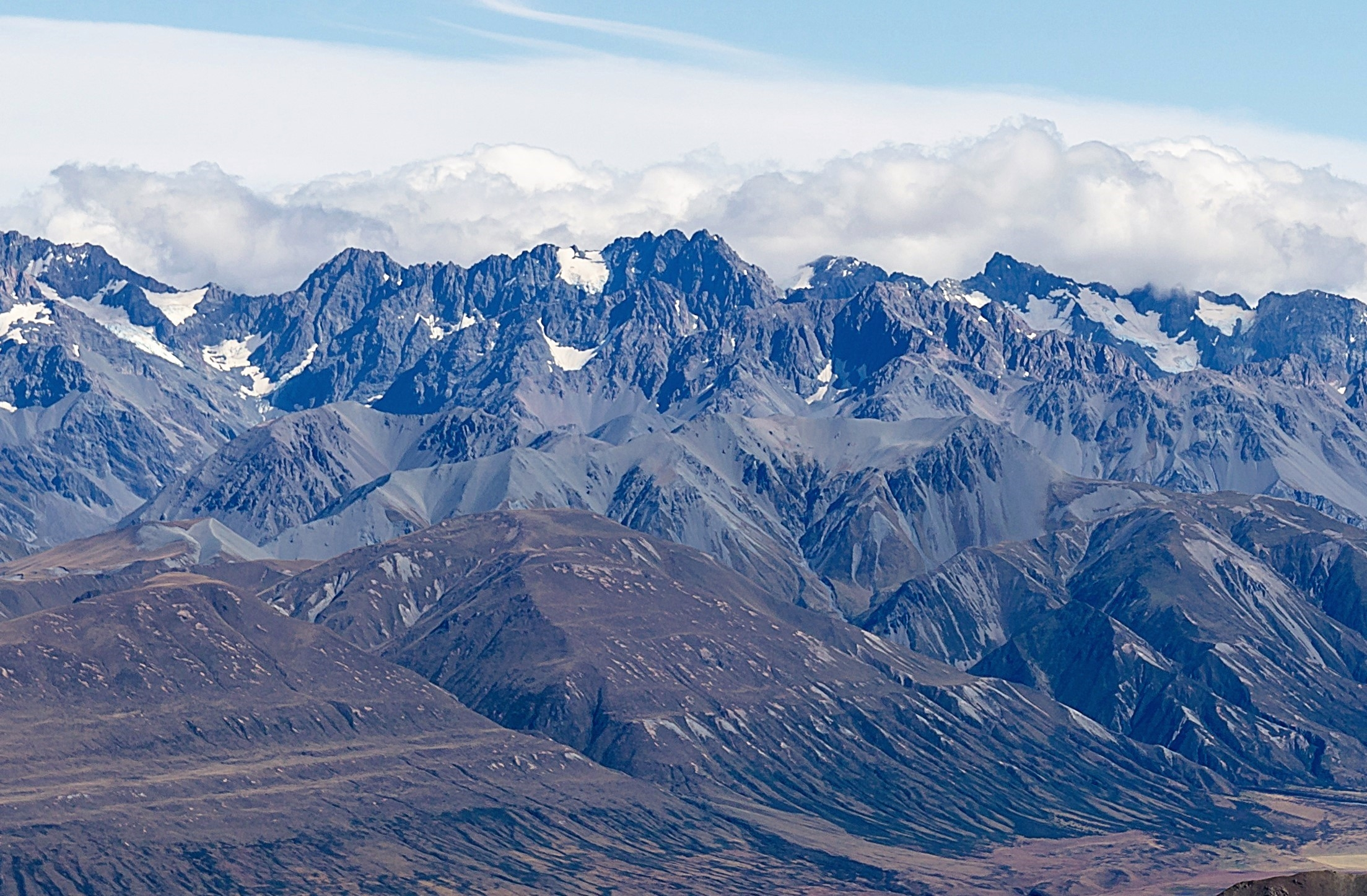
- Southeast aspect centred on skyline

Highest point
- Elevation: 2,706 m (8,878 ft)
- Prominence: 306 m (1,004 ft)
- Isolation: 3.38 km (2.10 mi)
- Listing: New Zealand #24
- Coordinates: 43°20′00″S 171°00′37″E

Geography
- Location within New Zealand
- Interactive map of Jagged Peak
- Location: South Island
- Country: New Zealand
- Region: Canterbury
- Parent range: Southern Alps; Arrowsmith Range
- Topo map(s): NZMS260 J35; Topo50 BW18

Climbing
- First ascent: December 1931
- Easiest route: North Ridge

Jagged Peak is a 2,706-metre-elevation (8,878-foot) mountain in the Canterbury Region of New Zealand.

== Description ==
Jagged Peak is located 125 kilometres (78 mi) west of Christchurch on the South Island. It is set in the Arrowsmith Range of the Southern Alps. Precipitation runoff from the mountain's northwest slope drains into the headwaters of the Lawrence River, the northeast slope drains to the Rakaia River via Jagged Stream, and the south slope drains into the headwaters of the Cameron River. Topographic relief is significant as the summit rises 900 metres (2,953 feet) above the Lawrence Glacier in one kilometre, and 600 metres (1,969 feet) above the Cameron Glacier in 0.5 kilometre. The nearest higher peak is Mount Arrowsmith, three kilometres to the southwest.

== Climbing ==
Climbing routes with the first ascents:

- North Ridge – Evan Wilson, Andy Anderson, Doug Brough, Stan Barnett – (1931)
- North East Face (descent) – Evan Wilson, Andy Anderson, Doug Brough, Stan Barnett – (1931)
- East Ridge – Stan Conway, Tom Newth, Frank Gillett – (1938)
- East Face – John Stanton, Kevin Carroll, Dick Beetham – (1971)
- Lawrence Buttress – Dave Gobey, R. Baggerly – (1972)
- Jagged-Upham Couloir – Lindsay Main, Warwick Anderson, James Jenkins, Mike Franklin – (1973)
- Deep Throat – Mike Franklin, Darryl Thompson – (1974)
- Whiplash – Tim Wethey, Lindsay Main, Mike Franklin, Daryll Thompson – (1975)

== Climate ==
Based on the Köppen climate classification, Jagged Peak is located in a marine west coast (Cfb) climate zone, with a subpolar oceanic climate (Cfc) at the summit. Prevailing westerly winds blow moist air from the Tasman Sea onto the mountains, where the air is forced upward by the mountains (orographic lift), causing moisture to drop in the form of rain or snow. This climate supports the Jagged, Lawrence, and Cameron glaciers surrounding the peak. The months of December through February offer the most favourable weather for viewing or climbing this peak.

== See also ==
- List of mountains of New Zealand by height

== Gallery ==
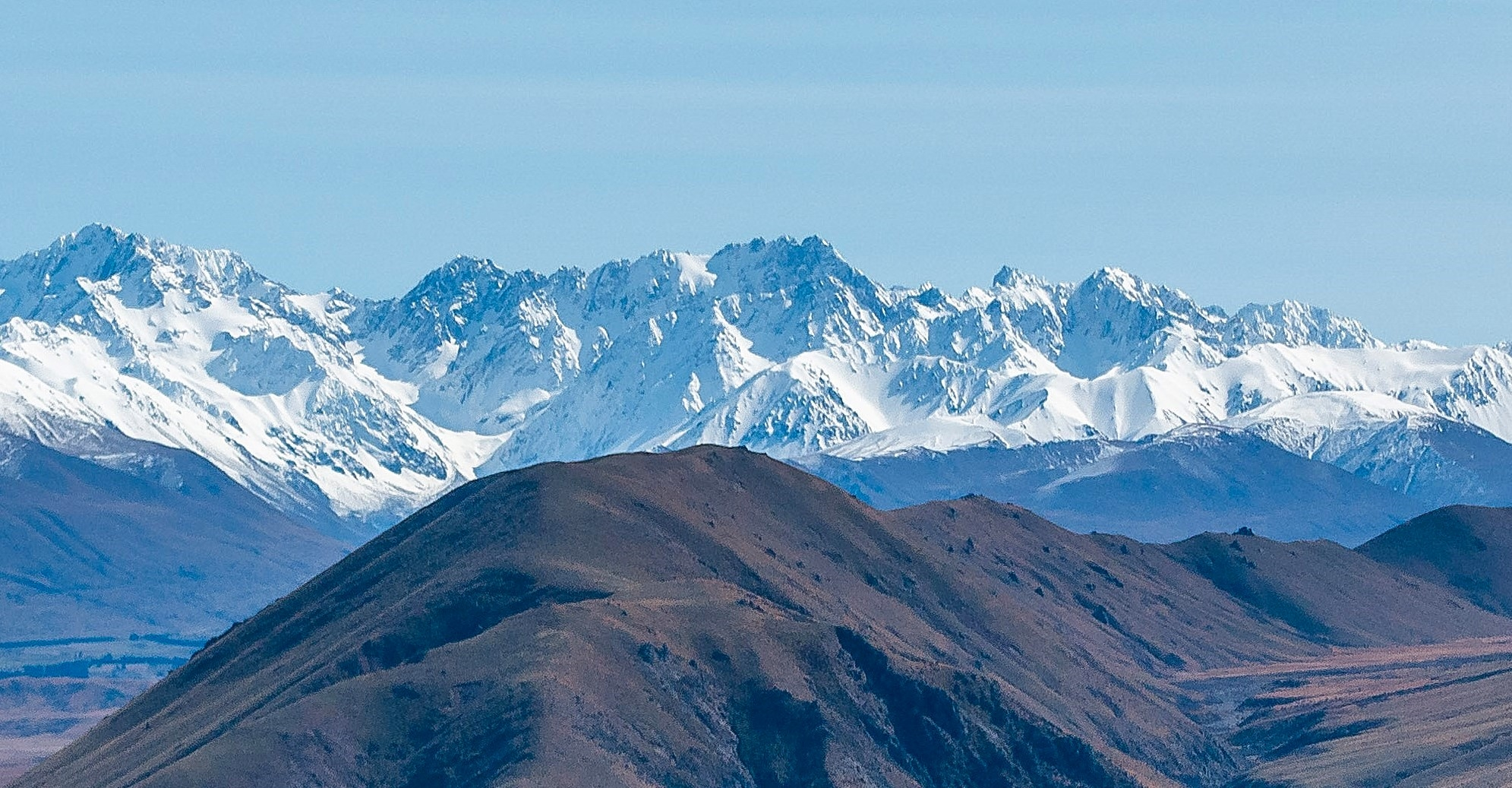
Jagged Peak centred on skyline

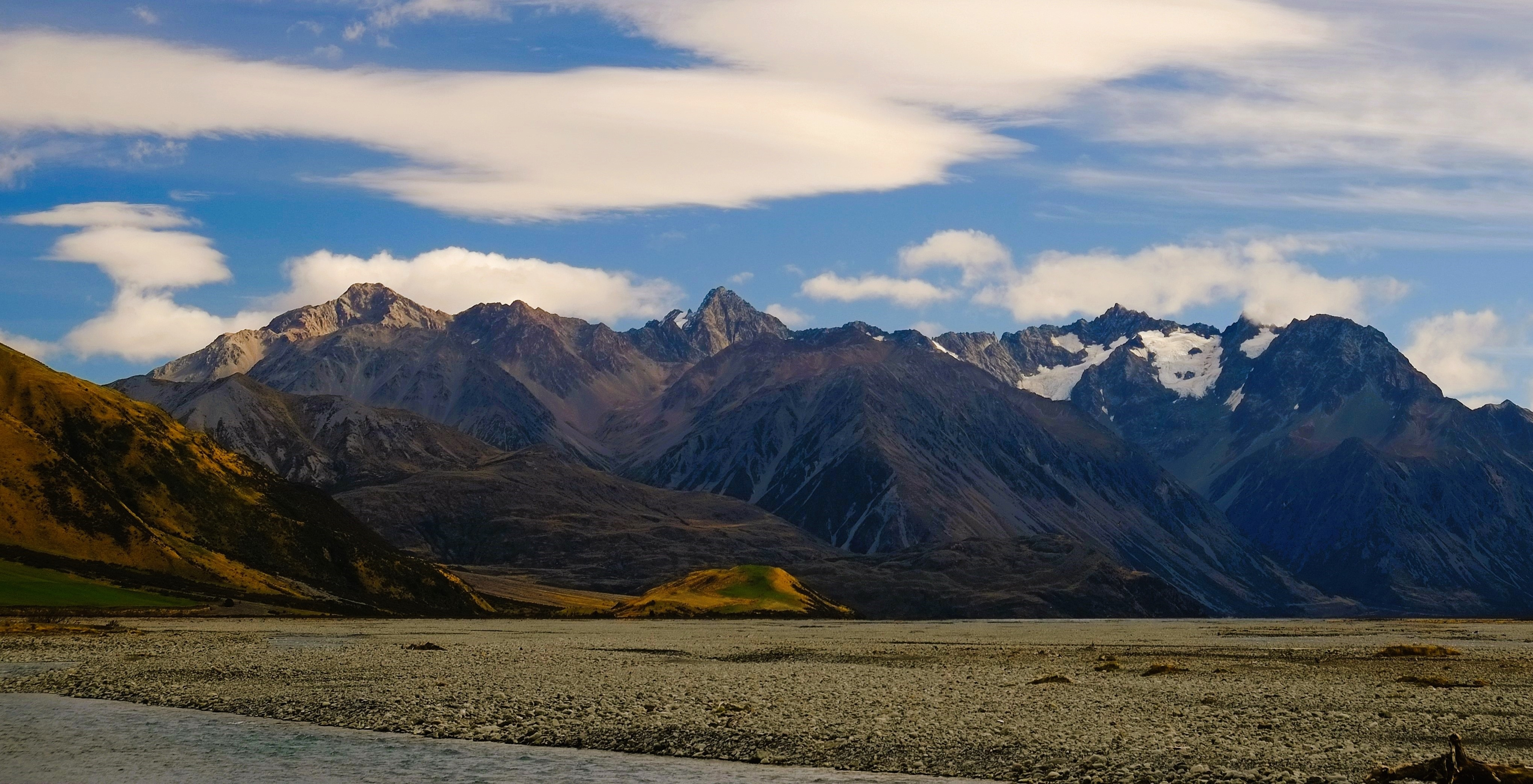
East aspect of Jagged Peak centred
The Marquee (2421m) to left, and North Peak (2628m) to right
