= Ken Bloxham =

- Born: Kenneth Charles Bloxham; 4 January 1954 Milton, New Zealand
- Died: 10 October 2000 (aged 46) Dunedin, New Zealand
- Height: 1.83 m (6 ft 0 in)
- Weight: 89 kg (196 lb)
- School: Tokomairiro High School
- Occupation: Sawmill owner

Rugby union career
- Position: Hooker
Provincial / State sides
Years	Team	Apps	(Points)
1974–1986	Otago	155	
International career
Years	Team	Apps	(Points)
1980	New Zealand	0	(0)

Kenneth Charles Bloxham (4 January 1954 – 10 October 2000) was a New Zealand rugby union footballer.

== Career ==
Born and educated in Milton, Bloxham represented the local Tokomairiro club, and won a place in the Otago provincial side from 1974 to 1986, playing as hooker. He captained Otago between 1980 and 1982.

He briefly represented New Zealand in 1980 when he was called on as a replacement player during that year's tour of Fiji. He played in two matches, including the international against Fiji, but the game was not given full test status by the New Zealand Rugby Union.

Bloxham died of cancer in Dunedin on 10 October 2000.
