= Red Peak (New Zealand) =

Mountain in New Zealand

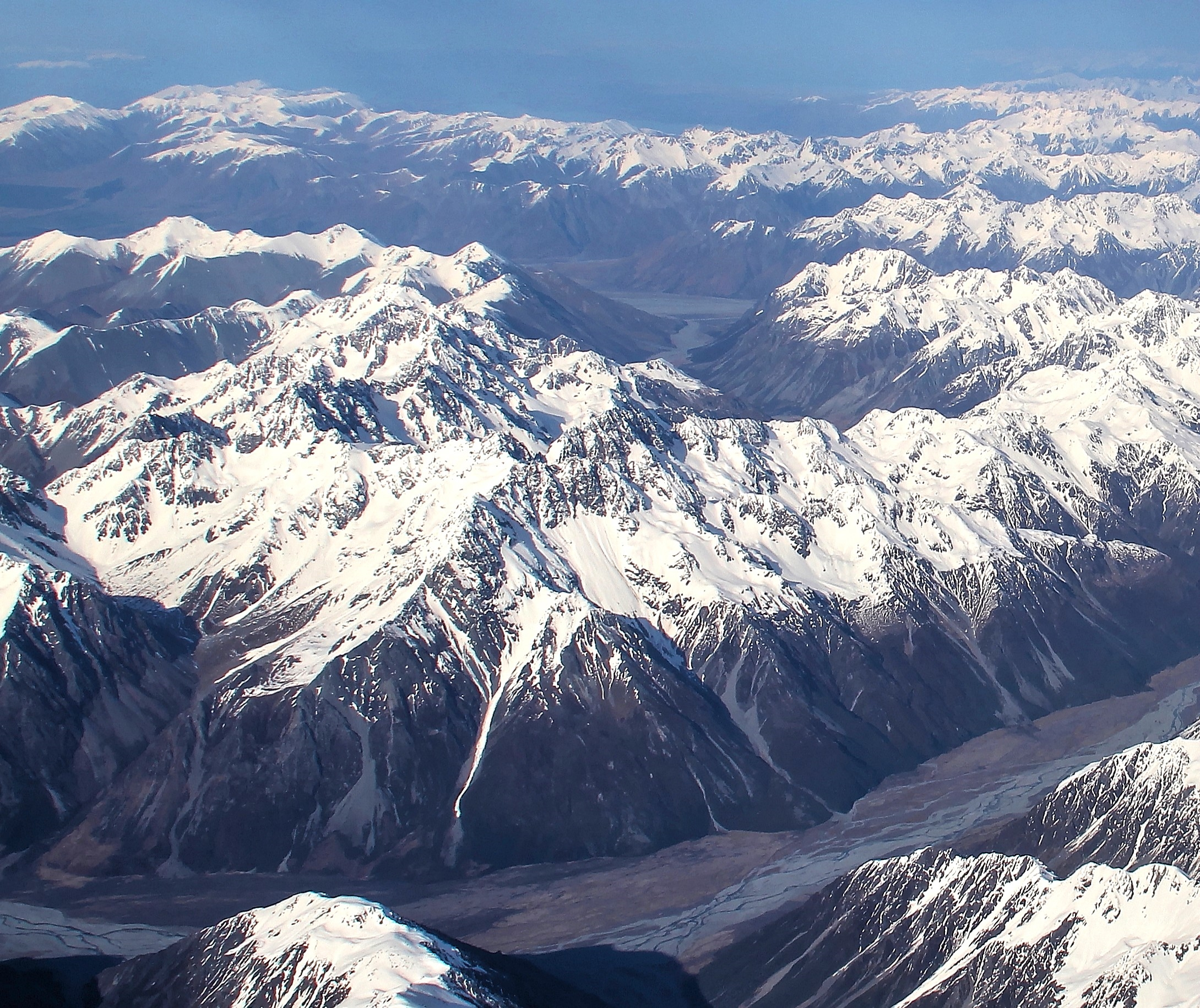
- North aspect centred in frame

Highest point
- Elevation: 2,637 m (8,652 ft)
- Prominence: 307 m (1,007 ft)
- Isolation: 2.62 km (1.63 mi)
- Listing: New Zealand #34
- Coordinates: 43°18′52″S 170°59′22″E

Naming
- Etymology: Red

Geography
- Location within New Zealand
- Interactive map of Red Peak
- Location: South Island
- Country: New Zealand
- Region: Canterbury
- Parent range: Southern Alps
- Topo map(s): NZMS260 J35; Topo50 BW18

Climbing
- First ascent: January 1933

Red Peak is a 2,637-metre-elevation (8,652-foot) mountain in the Canterbury Region of New Zealand.

== Description ==
Red Peak is located 120 kilometres (75 mi) west of Christchurch in the Southern Alps on the South Island. Precipitation runoff from the mountain's north slope drains to the Rakaia River via Reischek Stream, whereas the south slope drains into the headwaters of the Lawrence River. Topographic relief is significant as the summit rises 1,137 metres (3,730 feet) above the Lawrence River in 1.5 kilometre, and 737 metres (2,418 feet) above the Reischek Glacier in one kilometre. The nearest higher neighbour is Jagged Peak, 2.7 kilometres to the southeast. This mountain was originally named Mount Gould by Julius von Haast to honour John Gould, however the first ascent party of Lloyd Wilson and H.W. Cormack renamed it on account that the rock in this area is an especially red colour. This mountain's descriptive toponym has been officially approved as Red Peak by the New Zealand Geographic Board. The Mount Gould toponym was transferred to the 2,406-metre peak that is one kilometre immediately to the west.

== Climbing ==
Climbing routes with the first ascents:

- North Arête – Lloyd Wilson, H.W. (Sandy) Cormack – (1933)
- North Spur (descent) – Lloyd Wilson, H.W. (Sandy) Cormack – (1933)
- West Ridge – Jack Pattle, Warren Jones, Alan Morgan, Bob Watson – (1952)
- East Ridge – Mike Nelson, Robin Johnson – (1954)
- Lawrence Face – Alan Foot, Brian Stickle, W. Ellery – (1956)

== Climate ==
Based on the Köppen climate classification, Red Peak is located in a marine west coast (Cfb) climate zone, with a tundra (ET) at the summit. Prevailing westerly winds blow moist air from the Tasman Sea onto the mountains, where the air is forced upward by the mountains (orographic lift), causing moisture to drop in the form of rain or snow. This climate supports the Reischek and Lawrence glaciers surrounding the peak. The months of December through February offer the most favourable weather for viewing or climbing this peak.

Climate data for Upper Rakaia, elevation 1,752 m (5,748 ft), (1991–2020)
Month	Jan	Feb	Mar	Apr	May	Jun	Jul	Aug	Sep	Oct	Nov	Dec	Year
Mean daily maximum °C (°F)	11.0 (51.8)	11.4 (52.5)	10.0 (50.0)	7.4 (45.3)	5.1 (41.2)	3.3 (37.9)	2.2 (36.0)	2.8 (37.0)	3.8 (38.8)	5.1 (41.2)	6.6 (43.9)	9.0 (48.2)	6.5 (43.7)
Daily mean °C (°F)	7.4 (45.3)	7.9 (46.2)	6.5 (43.7)	4.0 (39.2)	2.0 (35.6)	−0.1 (31.8)	−1.3 (29.7)	−0.9 (30.4)	0.0 (32.0)	1.5 (34.7)	3.1 (37.6)	5.6 (42.1)	3.0 (37.4)
Mean daily minimum °C (°F)	3.8 (38.8)	4.4 (39.9)	3.0 (37.4)	0.5 (32.9)	−1.1 (30.0)	−3.5 (25.7)	−4.8 (23.4)	−4.6 (23.7)	−3.7 (25.3)	−2.1 (28.2)	−0.5 (31.1)	2.1 (35.8)	−0.5 (31.0)
Average rainfall mm (inches)	285.4 (11.24)	183.9 (7.24)	177.2 (6.98)	215.1 (8.47)	218.8 (8.61)	131.3 (5.17)	87.0 (3.43)	91.1 (3.59)	143.4 (5.65)	206.6 (8.13)	216.9 (8.54)	244.3 (9.62)	2,201 (86.67)
Source: CliFlo

== See also ==
- List of mountains of New Zealand by height
