= Red Peak (El Dorado County, California) =

Mountain in California, United States

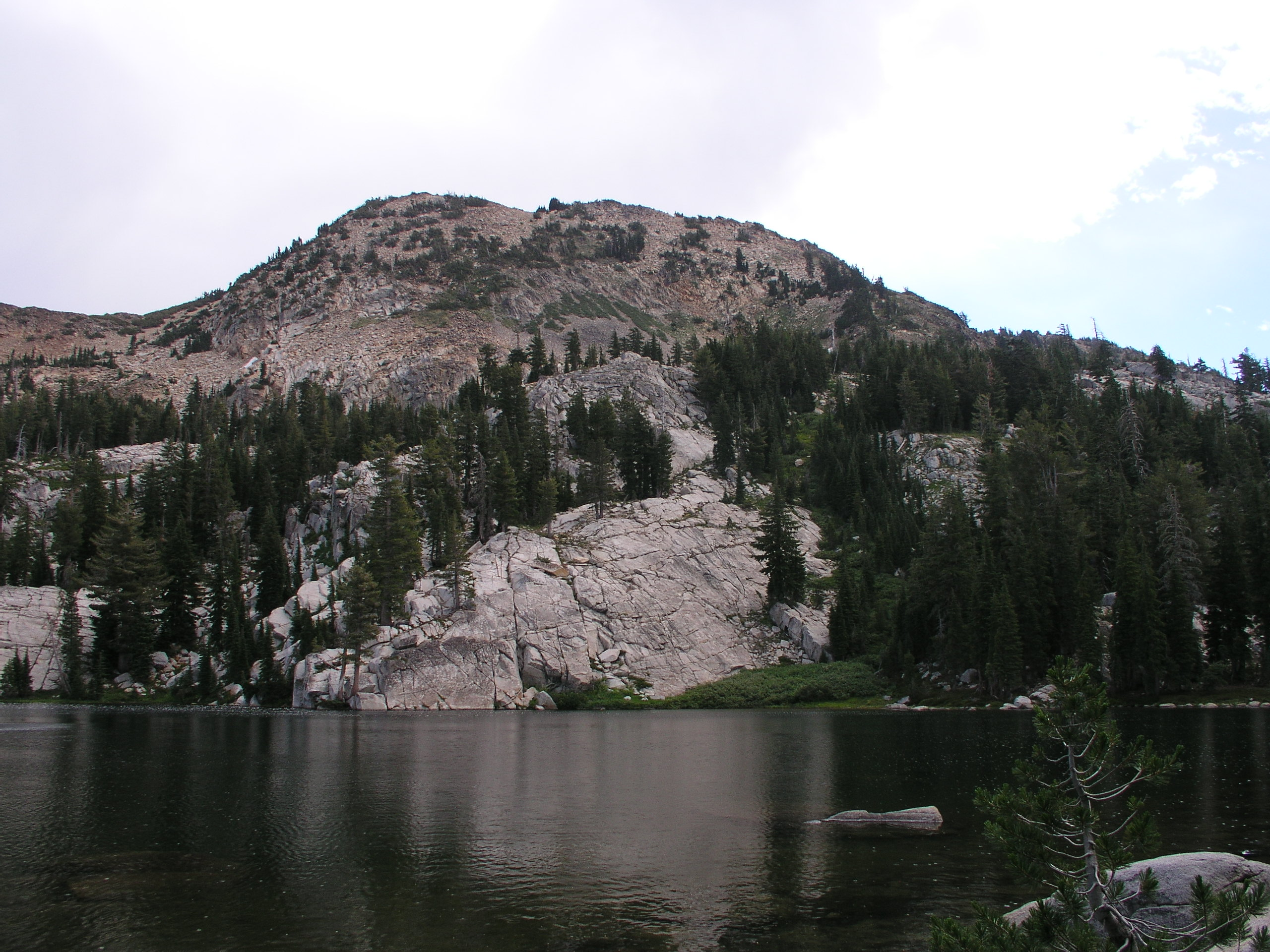
- The peak from Lake #3

Highest point
- Elevation: 9,311 ft (2,838 m) NAVD 88
- Prominence: 107 ft (33 m)
- Listing: Tahoe OGUL Emblem Peak
- Coordinates: 38°55′32″N 120°13′17″W

Geography
- Location within California
- Location: El Dorado County, California, U.S.
- Parent range: Sierra Nevada
- Topo map: USGS Rockbound Valley

Climbing
- Easiest route: Hike and scramble (class 1-2)

Red Peak is a mountain in the Sierra Nevada mountain range at the north end of the Crystal Range, to the west of Lake Tahoe. It is located in the Desolation Wilderness in El Dorado County, California.
