= New Zealand Alpine Club =

New Zealand national climbing organisation

NZAC
- The New Zealand Alpine Club
- Abbreviation: NZAC
- Nickname: Alpine Club
- Formation: 1891 (135 years ago)
- Founded at: Christchurch, New Zealand
- Legal status: Incorporated society
- Region served: New Zealand
- Members: 4,400 (2021)
- Affiliations: International Climbing and Mountaineering Federation (UIAA)
- Website: alpineclub.org.nz

The New Zealand Alpine Club (NZAC), is a national climbing organisation in New Zealand. It was founded 1891 and is one of the oldest alpine clubs in the world. NZAC was one of many founding members of International Climbing and Mountaineering Federation (UIAA), and still an active member. As of 2021, NZAC has over 4,000 members who are spread across twelve main sections, eleven in New Zealand and one in Australia, plus members in other countries. It runs a national office based in Christchurch.

== History ==
The NZAC was founded on 28 July 1891 at Warner's Commercial Hotel in Christchurch, New Zealand. Leonard Harper (Christchurch) was voted as the inaugural chairman in absentia. Harper had left for England on 25 July, and while away, it was discovered that he had embezzled money; hence he did not return. Frederick Hutton (Christchurch), Edward Sealy (Timaru), Malcolm Ross (Dunedin), and John Holland Baker (Wellington) were the inaugural vice-presidents. Arthur Paul Harper, Leonard Harper's son, was the inaugural secretary and treasurer.

== Overview ==
The club actively promotes climbing in New Zealand and overseas. It publishes guidebooks to New Zealand mountains and to selected rock climbing areas, and also makes this information accessible online. It publishes a quarterly magazine The Climber (which is also online), and the annual New Zealand Alpine Journal. NZAC owns 17 lodges and huts that are available for use by club members and other climbers. Most sections provide instruction courses for beginning climbers and the club also provides instruction for intermediate and advanced skills. NZAC sponsors the annual national bouldering series held during the summer at four locations, as well as other local and national competitive climbing events.

== Mountaineering ==
The visibility of mountaineering in New Zealand was boosted by the 1953 ascent of Mount Everest by Sir Edmund Hillary and Tenzing Norgay. Hillary is amongst the best known and most revered New Zealanders and was a life member of the NZAC. Other NZAC members have completed first ascents in many mountain areas, including in the Himalayas, Antarctica and the Andes.

New Zealand is a very mountainous country, and mountaineering has long been popular in New Zealand. The mountaineering opportunities focus particularly on the Southern Alps which run the length of the South Island, but also include other ranges such as the Kaikōuras, Arrowsmiths and the North Island volcanoes Mount Taranaki and Mounts Ruapehu, Ngauruhoe and Tongariro.

== Rock climbing ==
Rock climbing attracts many participants in New Zealand and the varied topography and rock types provide opportunities for rock climbing within some cities such as Auckland, Christchurch and Dunedin, and within an hours drive of most cities in New Zealand. Ice climbing, bouldering, sport climbing and trad climbing are all well established.
