= William Newsham Blair =

New Zealand engineer and surveyor

William Newsham Blair M.Inst.C.E. (10 August 1841 – 4 May 1891), was a New Zealand engineer and surveyor. He was born in Kilmeny, Islay, Argyllshire, Scotland on 10 August 1841. He was in the service of the Provincial Government of Otago from 1864 to 1865 whereupon he became district engineer in the Public Works Department of New Zealand in 1871, Engineer-in-charge of the Middle Island in 1878, and Assistant Engineer-in-Chief for the colony in 1884. In 1890 Mr. Blair was appointed Engineer-in-chief, and died on 4 May 1891.
