= Arrowsmith Range =

Mountain range in New Zealand

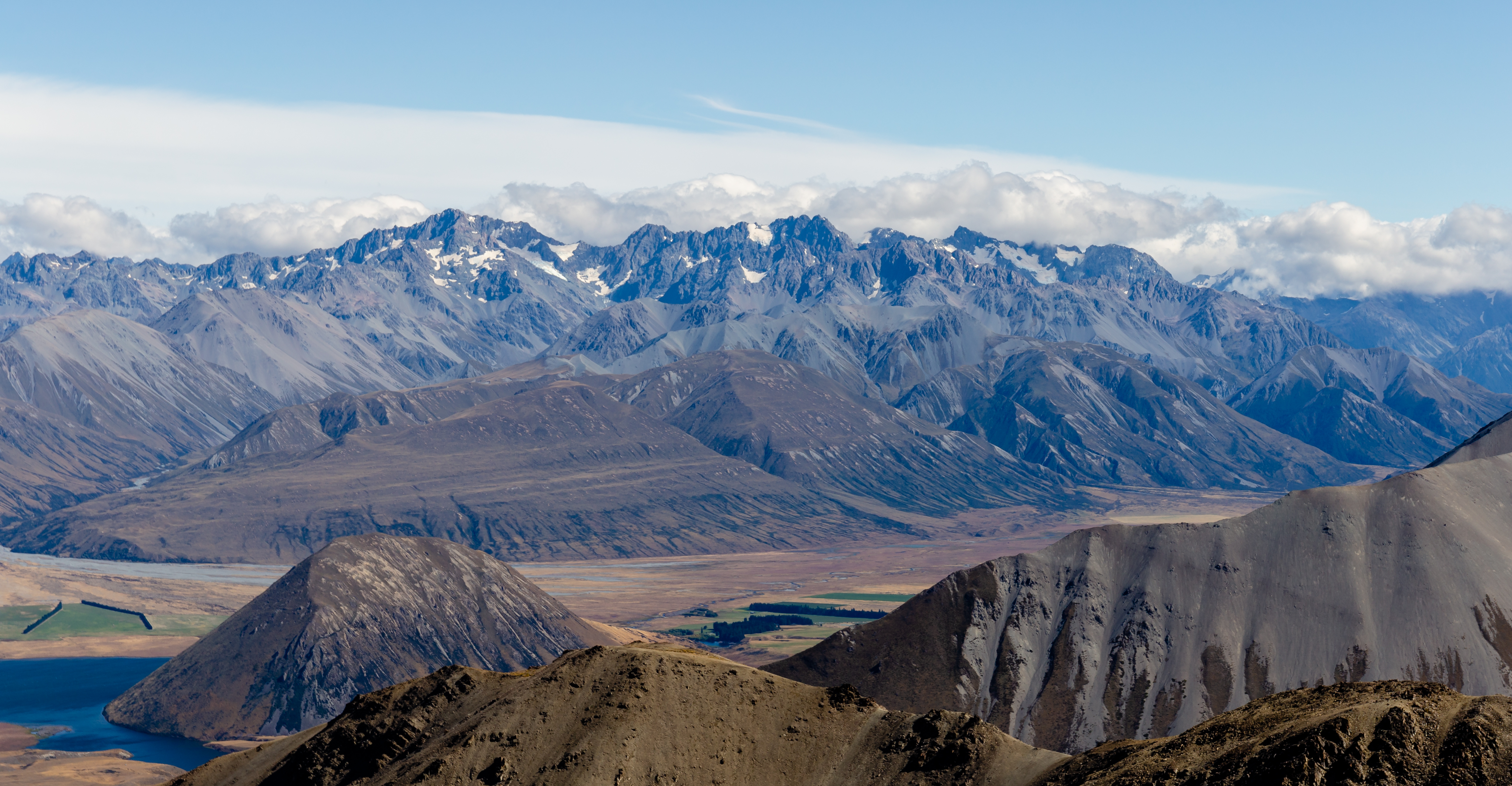

Highest point
- Peak: Mount Arrowsmith
- Elevation: 2,781 m (9,124 ft)
- Coordinates: 43°21′25.5″S 170°58′38″E

Dimensions
- Length: 10 km (6.2 mi)

Geography
- Country: New Zealand
- Region: Canterbury region
- District: Ashburton District

The Arrowsmith Range is a mountain range in the South Island of New Zealand. The range runs from southwest to northeast, parallel to the main ranges of the Southern Alps / Kā Tiritiri o te Moana. At the northeastern end, the range terminates at Jagged Peak (2,706 metres (8,878 ft)), whence a ridge connects to the Jollie Range. The lower Potts Range is a continuation at the southwestern end of the range. The highest point on the range is Mount Arrowsmith (2,781 metres (9,124 ft)).

It is believed that the range was named in honour of John Arrowsmith, the 19th century British cartographer.

== Peaks ==
Named peaks from northwest to southeast

Name	Elevation (m)
The Marquee	2421
Prop Peak	2408
Jagged Peak	2706
Upham Peak	2705
Tower Peak	2690
The Twins	2564
Couloir Peak	2642
Mount Arrowsmith	2781
Ashburton Peak	2359
Hakatere Peak	2298
South Peak	2343

== Rivers ==
The northwest side of the range is drained by the Lawrence River, a tributary of the Rangitata River, and the southeast side by the Ashburton River South Branch / Hakatere and the Cameron River which flows to Lake Heron.

== Glaciers ==
Although the peaks do not have permanent ice or snow, there are a number of permanent snowfields and glaciers on the range:

- Jagged Glacier
- Douglas Glacier
- Cameron Glacier
- South Cameron Glacier
- Ashburton Glacier

== Climate ==
Climate data for Upper Rakaia, elevation 1,752 m (5,748 ft), (1991–2020)
Month	Jan	Feb	Mar	Apr	May	Jun	Jul	Aug	Sep	Oct	Nov	Dec	Year
Mean daily maximum °C (°F)	11.0 (51.8)	11.4 (52.5)	10.0 (50.0)	7.4 (45.3)	5.1 (41.2)	3.3 (37.9)	2.2 (36.0)	2.8 (37.0)	3.8 (38.8)	5.1 (41.2)	6.6 (43.9)	9.0 (48.2)	6.5 (43.7)
Daily mean °C (°F)	7.4 (45.3)	7.9 (46.2)	6.5 (43.7)	4.0 (39.2)	2.0 (35.6)	−0.1 (31.8)	−1.3 (29.7)	−0.9 (30.4)	0.0 (32.0)	1.5 (34.7)	3.1 (37.6)	5.6 (42.1)	3.0 (37.4)
Mean daily minimum °C (°F)	3.8 (38.8)	4.4 (39.9)	3.0 (37.4)	0.5 (32.9)	−1.1 (30.0)	−3.5 (25.7)	−4.8 (23.4)	−4.6 (23.7)	−3.7 (25.3)	−2.1 (28.2)	−0.5 (31.1)	2.1 (35.8)	−0.5 (31.0)
Average rainfall mm (inches)	285.4 (11.24)	183.9 (7.24)	177.2 (6.98)	215.1 (8.47)	218.8 (8.61)	131.3 (5.17)	87.0 (3.43)	91.1 (3.59)	143.4 (5.65)	206.6 (8.13)	216.9 (8.54)	244.3 (9.62)	2,201 (86.67)
Source: CliFlo
