= Cameron River =

Coordinates: 43°27′S 171°11′E

Location
- Country: New Zealand

Physical characteristics
- Source
  - location: Mount Arrowsmith
- Mouth
  - location: Lake Stream
- Length: 17 km (11 mi)

The Cameron River is a river of New Zealand. It flows southeast from the slopes of Mount Arrowsmith in the Southern Alps / Kā Tiritiri o te Moana, reaching Lake Stream just to the north of the outflow from Lake Heron. The longer Ashburton River / Hakatere flows roughly parallel to the Cameron River, some 3 kilometres (2 mi) to the southwest.

== See also ==
- List of rivers of New Zealand
