= Mount Haidinger =

Mountain in New Zealand

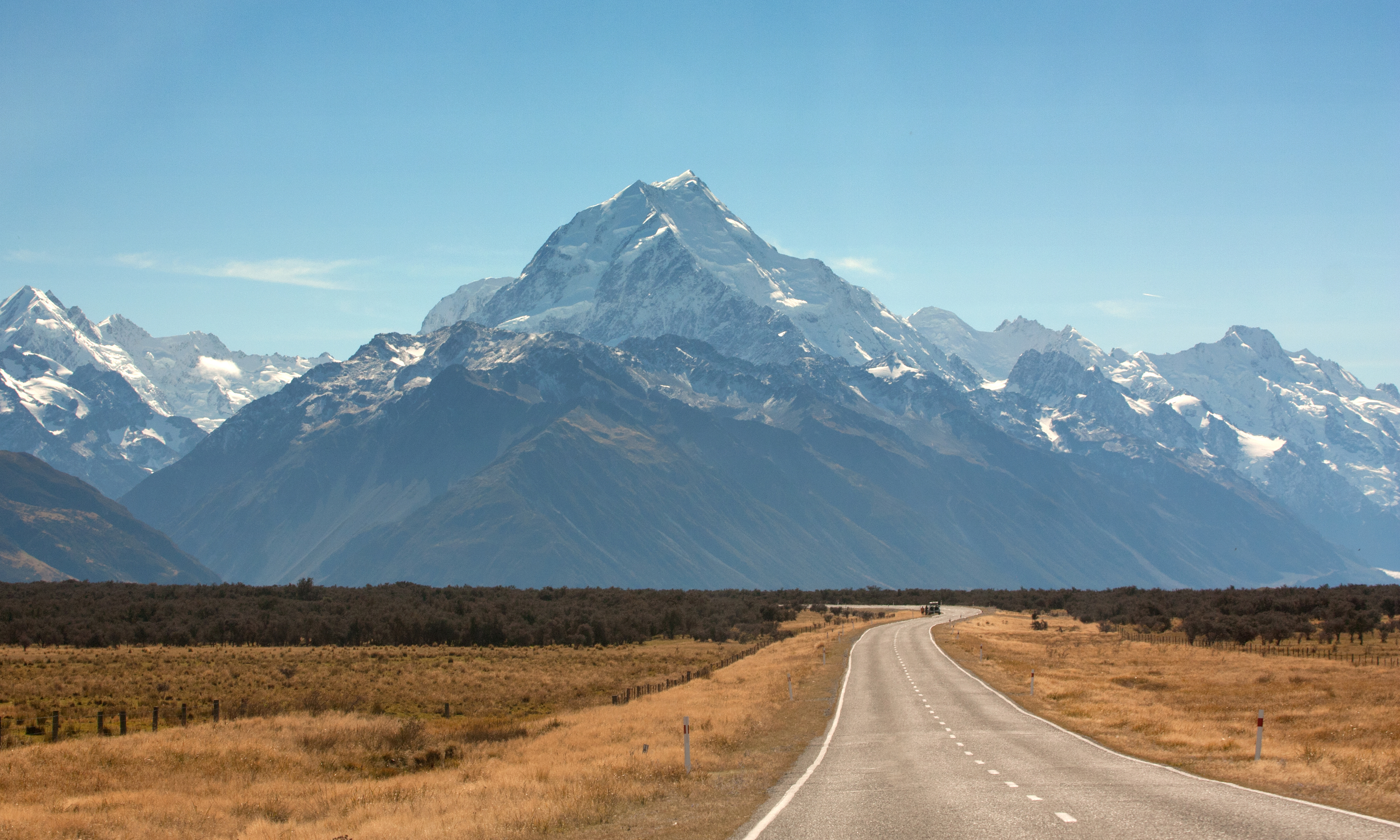
- Mount Haidinger on the right, Aoraki / Mount Cook in the middle.

Highest point
- Elevation: 3,070 m (10,070 ft)
- Listing: List of mountains of New Zealand by height
- Coordinates: 43°33′5″S 170°11′59″E

Geography
- Location within New Zealand
- Location: Canterbury, New Zealand

Mount Haidinger is a mountain of the Southern Alps, located in Aoraki / Mount Cook National Park. It has a double peak, with the northern peak being nine meters lower than the southern peak.

In 1895, Edward Arthur FitzGerald, Matthias Zurbriggen and Jack Clark recorded the summit success of the southern tip. The first ascent of the northern tip was accomplished in the same year by Tom Fyfe and Malcolm Ross. Mount Haidinger is more suited for climbing in the Southern Hemisphere summer between September and March.

Julius von Haast named the mountain after the Austrian geologist Wilhelm von Haidinger.

Fox Glacier with Douglas Peak centred and Mount Haidinger to right
