= Malcolm Ross (journalist) =

New Zealand journalist

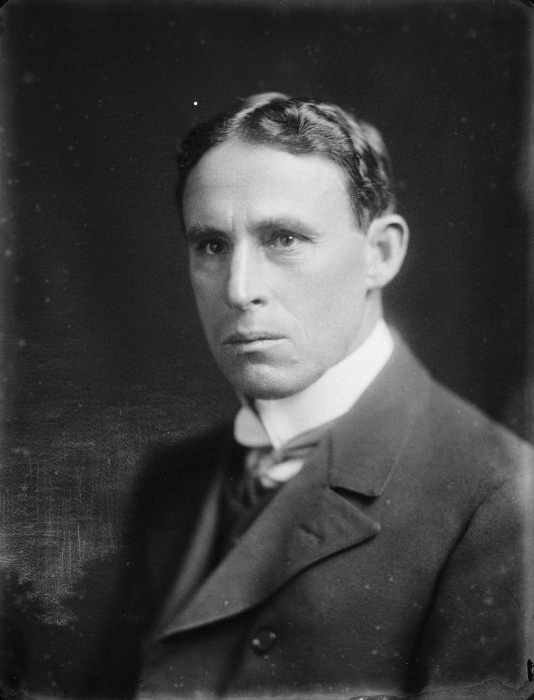
- Malcolm Ross in 1910
- Born: 13 July 1862; Saddle Hill, Otago, New Zealand
- Died: 15 April 1930 (aged 67); Wellington, New Zealand
- Occupation(s): Journalist; War Correspondent
- Spouse: Forrest Ross

Malcolm Ross (13 July 1862 – 15 April 1930) was a New Zealand journalist, mountain climber, and a war correspondent during the First World War. Born in Otago, he was employed by the Otago Daily Times from 1882 until 1889, when he began working for the Union Steam Ship Company. He resumed his career as a fulltime journalist in 1897, relocating to Wellington to report on parliamentary matters. Following the outbreak of the First World War, he went to German Samoa to cover its seizure by the New Zealand Military Forces. He was selected as the official war correspondent for New Zealand, reporting on the exploits of the New Zealand Expeditionary Force at Gallipoli and in Europe. His dispatches were criticised for their boring style and lack of timeliness although the latter was mainly as a consequence of constraints placed on him by the New Zealand Government. After the war he resumed his career as a member of the press gallery covering parliament until his retirement in 1926.

== Early life ==
Malcolm Ross was born in Saddle Hill, in Otago, New Zealand on 13 July 1862, the first son of Alexander and Mary Ross, Scottish emigrants who had arrived in the country in the 1850s. Ross was educated at Palmerston School and then went onto the University of Otago. He was active in many sports, participating in cycling, golf, running and rowing; he also represented Otago in rugby union.

== Journalist ==
After completing his formal education, he commenced work as a journalist for the Otago Daily Times (ODT) in 1882. While on assignment for the ODT covering a search for a missing climber, Ross discovered a mountain pass between Lake Manapouri and the Fiordland Sounds. Developing an interest in the area, Ross and his wife Elizabeth, who he married in 1890, often went exploring in the Southern Alps. He left his fulltime role at the ODT in 1889 to join the Union Steam Ship Company, becoming secretary to its chairman, James Mills. However, in his spare time he freelanced for the ODT.

Despite his change in vocation, Ross still went climbing. His accounts of expeditions in the mountains were published in the press, bringing attention to the sport and helping popularise climbing in New Zealand. He also wrote small publications for the tourism industry, in its infancy at the time. As he had developed an interest in photography, he illustrated his work with his own images. In 1891, Ross helped establish the New Zealand Alpine Club, serving as its founding vice-president and was also a fellow of the Royal Geographical Society. In 1894, he made an unsuccessful attempt to scale Mount Cook, New Zealand's highest mountain. He succeeded in doing so in 1906, which was the fourth ascent of the mountain. In 1914, he published A Climber in New Zealand, an account of his mountaineering career.

In 1897, Ross resumed his career as a journalist when he moved his family, which now included a son, to Wellington, to report on parliamentary matters for the ODT. He also reported for a Christchurch newspaper, The Press and was soon appointed correspondent for The Age, a Melbourne newspaper, and The Times. In 1899, he spent three months in Samoa, covering the clashes for the leadership of the colony that followed the death of Malietoa Laupepa, the incumbent chief at the time. Through his work, he became well acquainted with leading politicians, including William Massey, who shared a house with Ross and his wife for a time. When parliament was in recess, Ross was a free agent and often reported on public events and produced literature on them. When Ignacy Jan Paderewski, a noted Polish pianist, toured New Zealand in 1903, Ross acted as his agent. He also interviewed notable personalities. His work tended to be lengthy narratives, and he did little daily reporting.

== First World War ==
Upon the outbreak of the First World War on 5 August, the New Zealand Government authorised the raising of the New Zealand Expeditionary Force (NZEF) for service in the war. The day after the declaration of war, the British Government requested New Zealand seize the wireless station at German Samoa, a protectorate of the German Empire. Major General Alexander Godley, the Commandant of the New Zealand Military Forces, raised the Samoan Expeditionary Force with volunteers drawn primarily from New Zealand's Auckland and Wellington Military Districts. With the support of Godley, Ross went to Samoa to report on the Occupation of German Samoa. His appointment was criticised, particularly by the opponents of the Government. It was felt that Ross should represent all of the country's press rather than those newspapers that employed him.

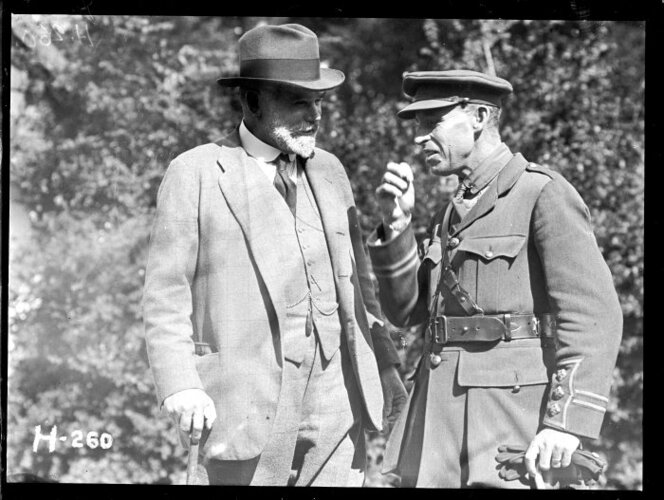
Official war correspondent for New Zealand, Malcolm Ross (right), stands next to the New Zealand High Commissioner Sir Thomas Mackenzie, September 1917

There was further controversy when the British War Office offered each of the Dominions of the British Empire the opportunity to designate a journalist as the official war correspondent for that country. For newspapers in New Zealand to send an independent journalist to provide coverage of the activities of the country's military forces was extremely expensive so they supported the initiative. Four newspaper editors drew up a shortlist of candidates from 47 applicants with Ross among them, one of four leading candidates. It took seven months for Ross to be confirmed in the role. Some believed that Massey, now prime minister, influenced the decision, although he later said he had recused himself from the discussions regarding Ross's appointment.

The length of time it took Ross to be confirmed in his appointment meant that he did not arrive in Gallipoli to report on the New Zealand contribution to the Gallipoli campaign until June 1915, two months after the main body of the NZEF, commanded by Godley, landed there. Once there, he was constrained by the Government's insistence that the reports he dispatched be sent by sea, instead by cable. This meant that much of the initial coverage of the campaign that reached New Zealand was written by Australian correspondents, particularly Charles Bean, the official war correspondent for Australia. Once he commenced reporting from Gallipoli, his dispatches took some time to be sent to New Zealand as, unlike other correspondents, he was not permitted to cable them. Instead, they were sent by ship and by the time his articles were published they were often several weeks old and had been preempted by reports from correspondents from Britain and Australia. Ross took ill in December and consequently missed the evacuation of the ANZAC forces from Gallipoli in December. Bean wrote a report on the evacuation which appeared in New Zealand newspapers under Ross's by-line.

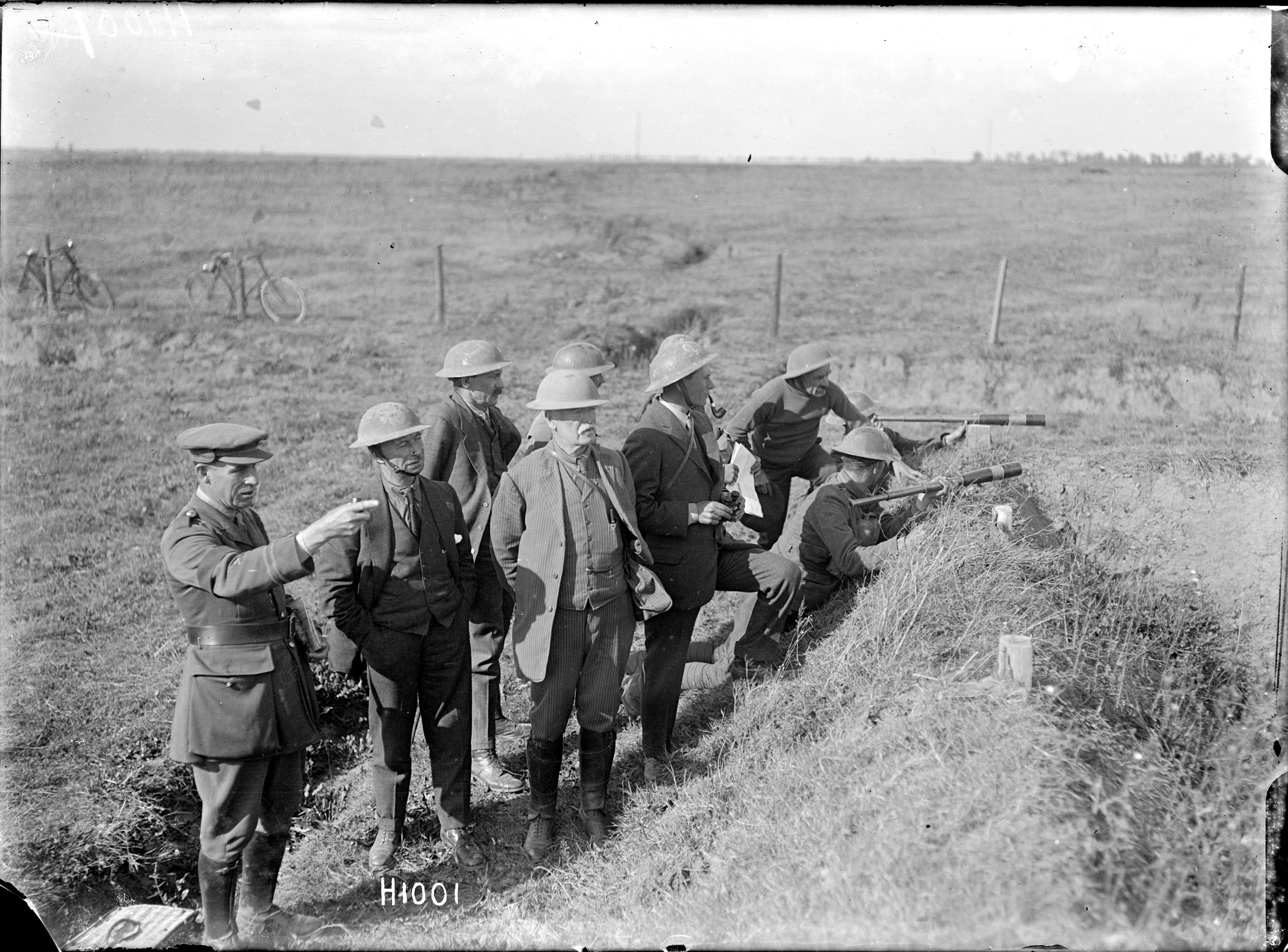
Ross pointing out to visiting journalists the way in which troops of the New Zealand Division advanced on the battlefield at Haplincourt in France, September 1918

In April 1916, Ross went to France to report on the fighting along the Western Front. By this time, he was able to utilise cable for dispatching his reports to New Zealand, although he had difficulty adapting his verbose style of writing to the more concise format called for by this method. He was made an honorary captain in the NZEF, to better facilitate his access to the front. However, this also meant that he was subjected to military censorship, portraying events more favourably than they actually were and not disclosing operational details. Among his first reports from the Western Front was commentary on the opening day of the Battle of the Somme; like that of many other correspondents, it was set in a positive tone and glossed over the heavy British casualties. Later in the year he published Light and Shade in War; this was a collection of his and son Noel's writings. Noel had served with the NZEF at Gallipoli until his discharge as a result of being wounded and was now working as a journalist in England.

By this time, the New Zealand Division, formed in March 1916, was serving on the Western Front. Ross went on to cover the major engagements in which it was involved, including the Battle of Flers–Courcelette, the Battle of Passchendaele, and the Capture of Le Quesnoy. His shorter reports were published relatively quickly, these being sent by cable, but were often still held up. His longer pieces, still being sent by sea, still took several weeks to make it to print in New Zealand. His output was criticised for its dull nature and there was increasing dissatisfaction regarding the quality of his reporting and its lack of timeliness. The latter was entirely out of Ross' control. Massey defended Ross when his role, and particularly his salary, was questioned in parliament and the Press Association unsuccessfully sought his recall in February 1917. Despite this, Ross continued as the official war correspondent for New Zealand until the end of the war. As a captain in the NZEF, he was entitled to receive campaign medals, these being the British War Medal and Victory Medal. He also received the 1914–15 Star as a result of his presence in Samoa at the start of the war.

== Later life ==
As part of his role as a war correspondent, Ross had been tasked with collecting material to be used in the production of a Government-sanctioned post-war official history of the conflict. At the conclusion of the First World War, the Government's focus turned to the preparation of the history. When it came to selecting its author, both Godley and Massey felt Ross was the most suitable. However, Major General Alfred Robin, commandant of the New Zealand Military Forces, was not as receptive, considering Ross' journalistic style inappropriate for the official history that he envisioned for students of military history. Ross knew of Robin's concerns and, in correspondence to Bean, he indicated that he would not be inclined to accept the commission even if it were offered. Although Robin also favoured the production of a more accessible popular history for the general public, which led to the Official History of New Zealand's Effort in the Great War, Ross was overlooked for that work as well.

After returning to New Zealand in September 1919, Ross resumed his work for the ODT as a correspondent in the parliamentary press gallery. Seen as an elder statesman among his peers, he encouraged newcomers to the reporting profession. He contributed a chapter on New Zealand's contribution to the war effort in Sir Charles Lucas's history of the First World War, The Empire at War, and also published a book of his son's writing; Noel had died in England of an illness in December 1917. Despite retiring in 1926, he continued to write. He died at home in Wellington on 15 April 1930. He was survived by his wife, Forrestina Elizabeth Ross, who was also a journalist and had worked in the press gallery. She died on 29 March 1936.

He is the namesake of Malcolm Peak, a mountain located in the Southern Alps.
