= Lawrence River =

Coordinates: 43.454740°S 170.856013°E

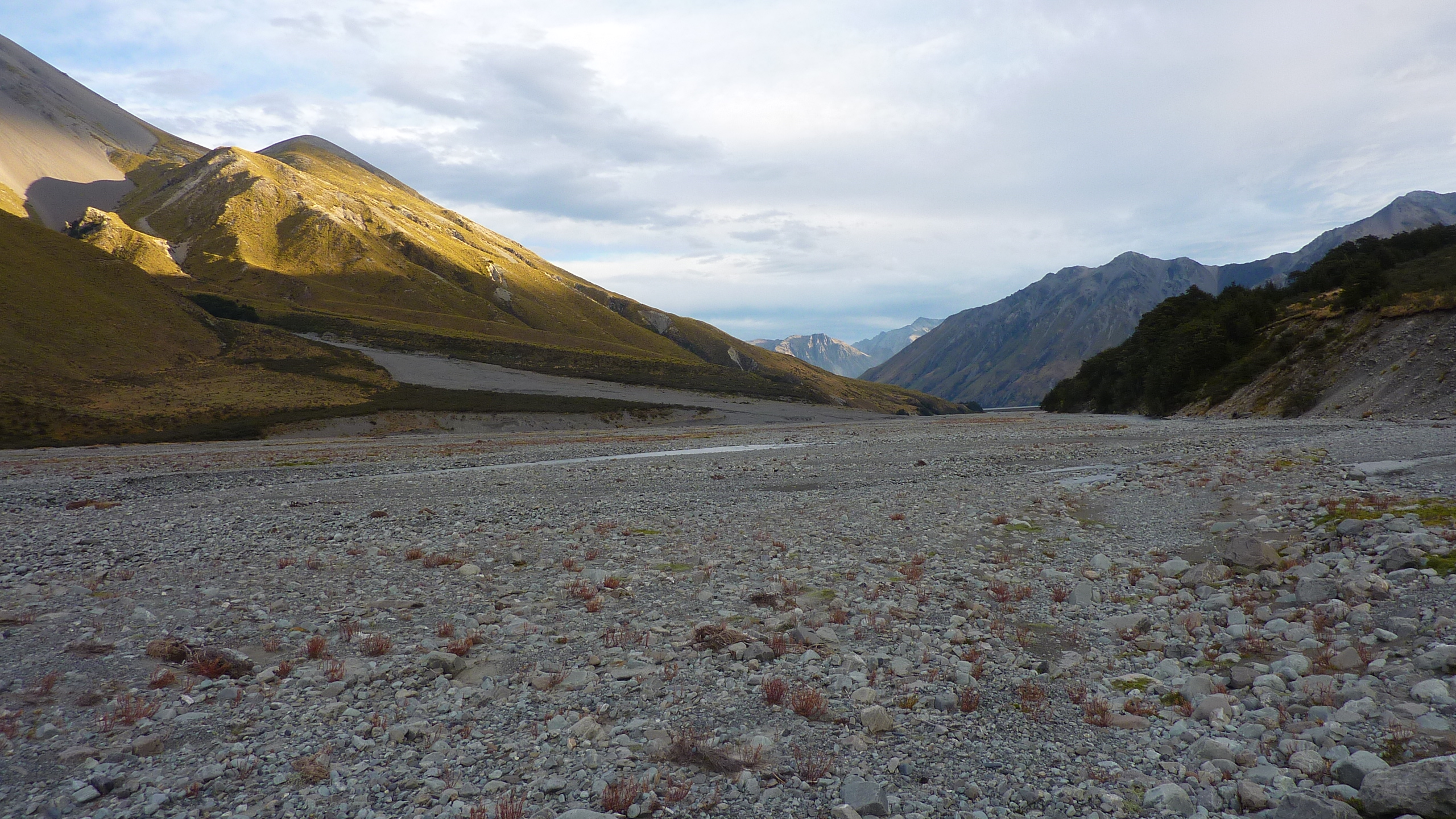

Location
- Country: New Zealand

Physical characteristics
- Source
  - location: Mount Arrowsmith
- Mouth
  - location: Rangitata River
- Length: 18 km (11 mi)

The Lawrence River is a river of inland Canterbury in New Zealand's South Island. One of the headwaters of the Rangitata River system, it flows south from its source north of Mount Arrowsmith, before joining with the Clyde River and Havelock River to become the Rangitata.

== See also ==
- List of rivers of New Zealand
