= Climate of New Zealand =

The climate of New Zealand is varied due to the country's diverse landscape. Most regions of New Zealand belong to the temperate zone with a maritime climate (Köppen climate classification: Cfb) characterised by four distinct seasons. Winters are relatively mild and summers comparatively cool. The main contributing factors are the Pacific Ocean and latitude, although the mountain ranges can cause significant climate variations in locations barely tens of kilometres from each other. Conditions vary from extremely wet on the West Coast of the South Island to almost semi-arid in Central Otago and subtropical in Northland.

== Weather ==
Köppen climate types of New Zealand

MetService (the Meteorological Service of New Zealand), established as a state-owned enterprise in 1992, issues weather forecasts and official weather warnings.

=== Rainfall ===
Most cities receive between 618 mm or 24.3 in (as in Christchurch) and 1,317 mm or 51.9 in (Whangārei) of precipitation annually. Rainfall is distributed uniformly throughout the year in most parts of the country, especially in the South Island. Northern and eastern parts of the country, including Auckland, Christchurch and Wellington see a slight winter maximum consistent with a Mediterranean climate. Summer and autumn maxima can be found in places closer to the southwest, such as Invercargill and Milford Sound.

How much rain a place receives is highly dependent on topography. The Southern Alps, the North Island Volcanic Plateau and surrounding ranges can produce large variation in rainfalls in places barely tens of kilometres apart. Milford Sound receives over 6,700 millimetres (260 in) of the rainfall a year on average while barely 100 kilometres (62 mi) away Alexandra in Central Otago receives only slightly greater than 300 millimetres (12 in) annually, giving it a borderline oceanic/semi-arid climate. Air laden with water vapour from the ocean is pushed from the west in response to Earth's rotation. This weather circulates the southern seas largely unimpeded by land until it reaches the Southern Alps. The humid westerly wind is forced up over the mountains, at cooler elevation water condenses and falls as snow or rain. This orographic rain explains the huge difference in conditions between the wet west and dry east of the South Island. The drier föhn wind descending the eastern slopes of the Southern Alps gives rise to a distinctive local weather phenomenon, the Nor'west arch, visible in much of Canterbury and parts of Otago.

=== Tornadoes ===
Each year, there are 7–10 damaging tornadoes that touch down in New Zealand, occurring mostly along the west coast of both islands. Tornadoes in New Zealand most often form from squall lines ahead of cold fronts, which have the potential to spawn mesocyclones capable of tornadogenesis. Tornadoes in the country are usually short-lived, narrow, and weak. However, the country's National Institute of Water and Atmospheric Research (NIWA) assessed the 1948 Frankton tornado as an EF3 on the Enhanced Fujita scale, making it New Zealand's strongest known tornado. The 1948 tornado was also its most impactful, with 200 buildings damaged, as well as a rare deadly tornado in the country, with three deaths.

=== Snowfall ===
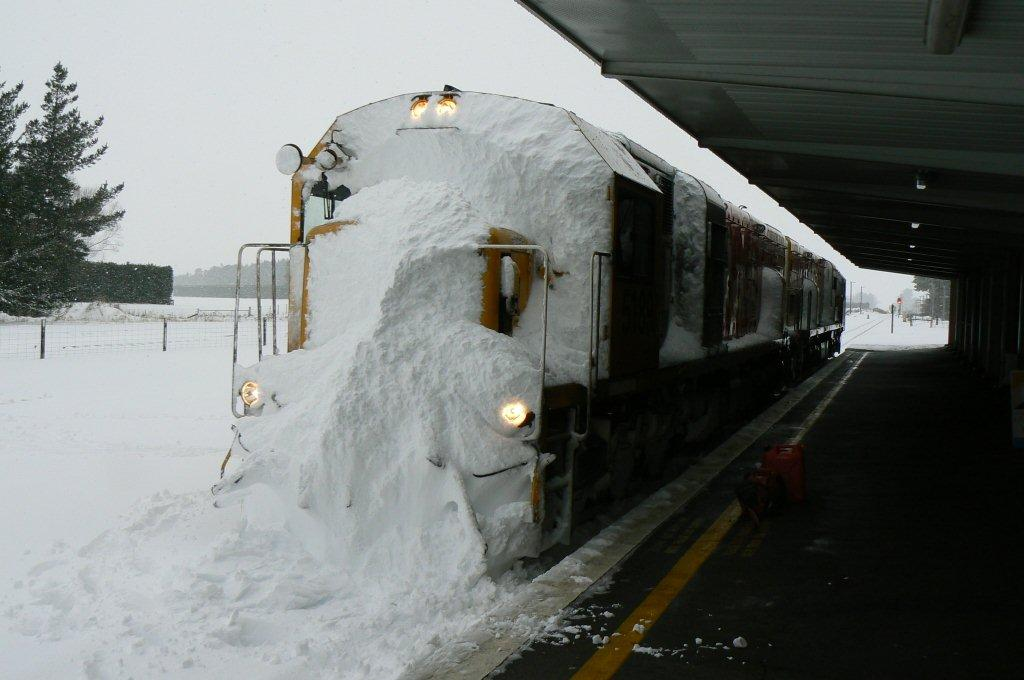
Midland Line blanketed in heavy snow

Snow falls in New Zealand's South Island and at higher altitudes in the North Island. It is extremely rare at sea level in the North Island. Snow is more common inland in both main islands, though snow to sea level does occur on average once or twice per year in the central and southern South Island.

=== Temperature ===
As with many islands in the world, the influence of the ocean curtails any extremes in coastal temperature. The greater temperature ranges are found in the interior of the Canterbury and Otago regions, and especially Central Otago. Central Otago and inland Canterbury's Mackenzie Basin have the closest New Zealand has to continental climates, being generally drier (due in part to föhn winds) and less directly modified by the ocean. These areas can experience summer temperatures in the low 30s °C (high 80s/low 90s °F) and snow and severe frosts in winter, the latter exacerbated by hoar frosts in the river valleys and basins.

==== Annual mean temperature ====
Mean annual temperatures range from 10 °C (50 °F) in the south to 16 °C (61 °F) in the north. The coldest month is usually July and the warmest month is usually January or February. Generally there are relatively small variations between summer and winter temperatures. An example of this is Auckland which has a variation of just 9 °C or 16 °F between the average mid-winter high temperature (14.7 °C or 58.5 °F) and average mid-summer high temperature (23.7 °C or 74.7 °F). Temperature variation throughout the day is also relatively small. The exception to this is inland areas and to the east of the ranges with daily variations that can be over 25 °C and differences of up to 14 °C between the average summer and winter high temperatures. Temperatures also drop about 0.7 °C or 1.3 °F (−17.1 °C) for every 100 m (300 ft) of altitude.

Northern cities such as Auckland, Whangārei, and Tauranga experience mean yearly maxima of between 19–20 °C (66–68 °F) and mean yearly minima of around 11–12 °C (52–54 °F). Eastern cities on the North Island such as Gisborne, Napier, and Hastings also have mean yearly maxima of between 19–20 °C (66–68 °F) but have slightly lower yearly mean minima of around 9–10 °C (48–50 °F). The two largest cities on the South Island, Christchurch and Dunedin, have mean yearly maxima of 17.3 °C (63.1 °F) and 14.6 °C (58.3 °F) and yearly mean minima of 7.3 °C (45.1 °F) and 7.6 °C (45.7 °F) respectively.

==== Summer ====
Daily maximum temperatures are normally in the mid to low 20s (°C) over most of the country. They are higher in northern, eastern and interior part of the country; Hastings is the warmest city on average with 25.5 °C followed by Gisborne with 24.9 °C and Napier with 24.5 °C. Eastern parts of the South Island are highly susceptible to the norwester, a Fohn wind which can result in temperatures going into the high 30s and even the low 40s. Rangiora in Canterbury holds the record maximum of 42.4 °C recorded in 1973, with Christchurch recording 41.6 °C in that same year. More recently, Timaru reached 41.3 °C on Waitangi Day in 2011. Due to these winds, the cooler South Island cities such as Dunedin, Christchurch and Invercargill have higher all-time record temperatures than places further north such as Wellington, Auckland and Whangārei.

==== Winter ====
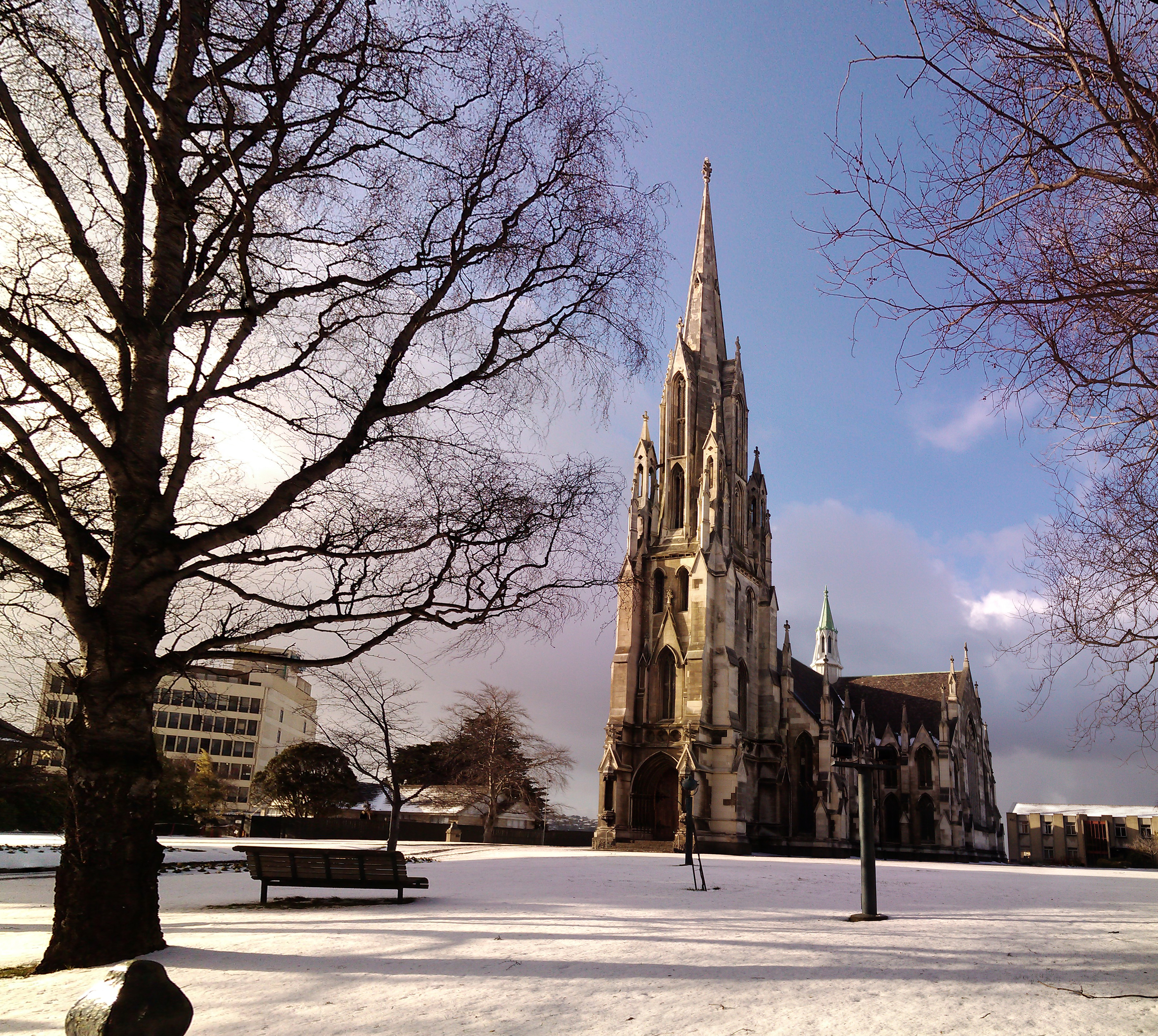
August 2011 winter's snowfall in Dunedin, Otago

Winter temperatures are considerably milder in New Zealand compared to other areas of similar latitude, with the exception of the Central Otago and Mackenzie Basin regions mentioned above. Maxima are generally 10–15 °C (50–59 °F) in the North Island, decreasing as one goes further south or inland. The South Island is a bit cooler, with maximum temperatures around 7–12 °C (45–54 °F), though sometimes lower. The lowest temperature ever recorded was −25.6 °C (−14.1 °F) at Ranfurly in Otago in 1903, with a more recent temperature of −21.6 °C (−6.9 °F) recorded in 1995 in nearby Ophir.

=== Severe weather events ===
July 1863 The blizzard and flood of 1863 was a series of consecutive natural disasters in Central Otago in New Zealand's South Island. From July to August 1863 the Otago gold fields suffered from a combination of floods, snowstorms, and blizzards that caused heavy loss of life among the gold miners. At least 40 died during the July rains and more than 11 in the August snows. Sources using the earliest reports of loss of life tend to greatly overstate the numbers who died.

1–6 February 1868: The Great storm of 1868 was a violent storm that swept across much of New Zealand wrecking 12 ships and causing extensive flooding. About 40 lives were known lost and at the time an estimated £500,000 to £1 million worth of damage was caused. The storm is currently thought to have been an ex-tropical cyclone.

16 April 1897: The storm of 1897 was a severe storm that struck the lower to central North Island of New Zealand on 16 April 1897. It caused the ship Zuleika to run aground near Cape Palliser, with the loss of 12 lives, and severe flooding. At Clive the flooding caused the loss of a further 12 lives and one person was drowned near Kapiti. There were 6 further unconfirmed reports of drowning, bringing the total loss of life directly related to the storm event to between 25 and 31. Based on descriptions of the storm, particularly that of Captain Marten of the Waiapu, it may have been an ex-tropical cyclone.

2 February 1936: The Cyclone of 1936 was the worst storm of the 20th century in New Zealand.

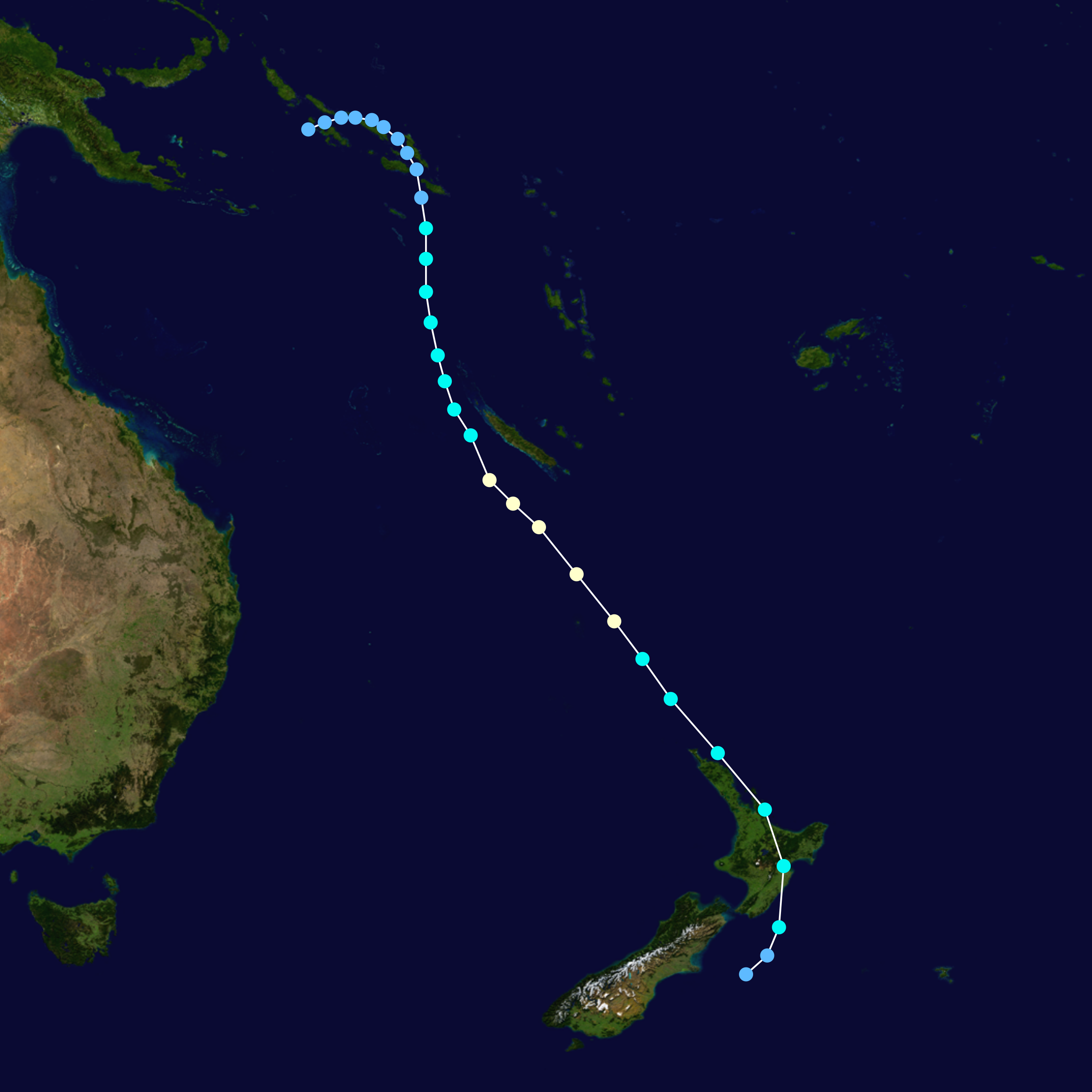
Track map of Cyclone Giselle

10 April 1968: Cyclone Giselle caused peak gusts of 145 knots (270 km/h) near Wellington, after colliding with an Antarctic storm moving north. Giselle led to the sinking of the interisland ferry TEV Wahine, and the loss of 53 lives. Total damage caused by the storm was estimated at $14 million.

20 December 1976: Heavy rain caused widespread flooding and landslides in Wellington City and Hutt Valley. Hutt River burst its stopbanks and workers in Petone took refuge on factory roofs while rail links between Wellington city and the Hutt were suspended stranding thousands of commuters. Landslides destroyed houses and a boy was killed by a collapsing wall when a slip struck a hall in Crofton Downs. More than 350 mm of rain fell in 24 hours.

6–10 March 1988: New Zealand is hit by a tropical cyclone once every eight to nine years. Cyclone Bola was one of the costliest cyclones in the history of New Zealand, causing severe damage as an extratropical cyclone when it passed near the country.

27–28 August 1992: The "Big Snow", Canterbury's heaviest snowfall in 30 years, brought snow down to sea level across the region, with up to 30 cm (12 in) recorded in Christchurch. The storm caused widespread power outages and forced the closure of schools, inland roads and Christchurch Airport. Occurring during the lambing season, it caused the deaths of an estimated one million sheep and lambs, costing farmers approximately $40 million.

4 October 1997: More than 60 homes were flooded and residents in Lower Hutt riverside areas were evacuated during downpours. Two people died, and isolated landslips closed some Wellington roads and parts of State Highway 1.

26 June 1998: A severe thunderstorm affected Karori and Kelburn, with rain breaking all previous records and falling at a rate with a return period of well over 200 years. Rainfall at Kelburn totalled 69.5 mm between 7.35pm and 9.10pm.

13–27 October 1998: Gale force northwesterlies blew throughout the lower North Island. On 18 October, gusts of 183 km/h were recorded at Castlepoint. Winds were most severe on the following two days, when a gust of 215 km/h was recorded on a Wairarapa farm. A truck was overturned, ships ripped from their moorings in Wellington, and some houses lost their roofs.

10 January 2002: Thunderstorms over Wellington resulted in torrential rainfall, about 40 mm in 30 minutes, and flash floods in the city centre. Similar storms, some with hail and surface flooding also happened in Whanganui, Manawatu, the central and eastern North Island, Buller and Nelson. The average recurrence interval of this rainfall event was estimated at more than 100 years.

14–16 February 2004: The Valentine's Day storms left hundreds of people homeless, and silt and floodwaters inundated considerable areas of farmland. Many rivers breached their banks, bridges were damaged and stock was swept away by floodwaters. A civil state of emergency was declared in Whanganui, Manawatu and Rangitikei. About 500 Lower Hutt residents were evacuated because of floodwaters, and many commuters were unable to enter Wellington. The event produced galeforce southerlies, with gusts of 230 km/h in the Tararua Range, and swells of 11m in Cook Strait.

25 July and 14 August 2011 New Zealand snowstorms: The first severe winter storm brought the coldest winter snap in fifteen years. During August snow fell consistently down to sea level in Wellington for the first time since 1976, and snowflakes even fell for a brief time in Auckland for the first time in 80 years.

20–21 June 2013 New Zealand storm: This extra-tropical system was first felt in the South Island by heavy snowfall on 18 and 19 June. Late on 20 June, the storm pushed northeast to the North Island, bringing very strong winds until early 23 June. Schools were cancelled during the shortest day (21 June), due to massive damage.

27 January 2023 Auckland Anniversary Weekend floods: record rainfall particularly centred around the Auckland region caused widespread flooding with 4 fatalities and an estimated insurance loss of about NZ$2.2 billion (US$1.43 billion) and total costs of about NZ$4 billion, with hundreds of "category 3" flood-damaged properties.

12–16 February 2023: The extratropical remnants of Cyclone Gabrielle passed over the North Island bringing heavy rain and damaging winds causing serious flooding in a number of regions. Eleven people died and $13.5 billion in damage was caused causing Gabrielle to become the deadliest cyclone since Giselle and overtook Bola as the costliest cyclone on record.

== Statistics ==
=== By area ===
Auckland

Climate chart (precipitation, max. and min. temperature)
J	F	M	A	M	J	J	A	S	O	N	D
75 23 15	65 24 16	94 22 15	105 20 12	103 17 10	139 15 8	146 15 7	121 15 8	116 16 9	91 18 11	93 20 12	91 22 14
- █ Average max. and min. temperatures in °C
- █ Precipitation totals in mm
Imperial conversion
J	F	M	A	M	J	J	A	S	O	N	D
3 74 60	2.6 75 60	3.7 72 58	4.1 68 54	4.1 63 50	5.5 59 46	5.7 58 45	4.8 59 46	4.6 61 48	3.6 64 51	3.7 67 54	3.6 71 57
- █ Average max. and min. temperatures in °F
- █ Precipitation totals in inches

Wellington

Climate chart (precipitation, max. and min. temperature)
J	F	M	A	M	J	J	A	S	O	N	D
72 20 13	62 21 14	92 19 13	100 17 11	117 14 9	147 12 7	136 11 6	123 12 7	100 14 8	115 15 9	99 17 10	86 19 12
- █ Average max. and min. temperatures in °C
- █ Precipitation totals in mm
Imperial conversion
J	F	M	A	M	J	J	A	S	O	N	D
2.8 69 56	2.4 69 56	3.6 66 55	3.9 62 52	4.6 58 48	5.8 54 44	5.4 53 43	4.8 54 44	3.9 56 46	4.5 59 48	3.9 62 51	3.4 65 54
- █ Average max. and min. temperatures in °F
- █ Precipitation totals in inches

Hokitika

Climate chart (precipitation, max. and min. temperature)
J	F	M	A	M	J	J	A	S	O	N	D
250 19 12	172 20 12	217 19 11	249 17 8	245 14 6	233 12 4	232 12 3	224 13 4	250 14 6	286 15 7	240 17 9	278 18 11
- █ Average max. and min. temperatures in °C
- █ Precipitation totals in mm
Imperial conversion
J	F	M	A	M	J	J	A	S	O	N	D
9.8 67 53	6.8 68 54	8.5 66 51	9.8 62 47	9.6 58 43	9.2 54 39	9.1 54 37	8.8 55 39	9.8 57 42	11 59 45	9.4 62 48	11 65 51
- █ Average max. and min. temperatures in °F
- █ Precipitation totals in inches

Christchurch

Climate chart (precipitation, max. and min. temperature)
J	F	M	A	M	J	J	A	S	O	N	D
42 23 12	39 22 12	54 20 11	54 18 8	56 15 5	66 12 2	79 11 2	69 12 3	47 15 5	53 17 7	44 19 9	49 21 11
- █ Average max. and min. temperatures in °C
- █ Precipitation totals in mm
Imperial conversion
J	F	M	A	M	J	J	A	S	O	N	D
1.7 73 54	1.5 72 54	2.1 69 51	2.1 64 46	2.2 58 40	2.6 53 36	3.1 52 35	2.7 54 37	1.9 59 41	2.1 63 45	1.7 67 48	1.9 70 52
- █ Average max. and min. temperatures in °F
- █ Precipitation totals in inches

Alexandra

Climate chart (precipitation, max. and min. temperature)
J	F	M	A	M	J	J	A	S	O	N	D
50 25 11	33 25 10	29 22 7	22 18 4	27 14 2	32 9 −2	24 8 −2	18 13 −1	21 16 2	29 19 4	31 21 7	43 23 9
- █ Average max. and min. temperatures in °C
- █ Precipitation totals in mm
Imperial conversion
J	F	M	A	M	J	J	A	S	O	N	D
2 77 51	1.3 77 50	1.1 72 45	0.9 64 39	1.1 56 35	1.3 48 29	0.9 47 28	0.7 55 31	0.8 62 36	1.1 66 40	1.2 70 44	1.7 74 49
- █ Average max. and min. temperatures in °F
- █ Precipitation totals in inches

Location	Climate type	January temperature		July temperature		Annual rainfall
Location	Climate type	Mean daily maximum	Mean daily minimum	Mean daily maximum	Mean daily minimum	Annual rainfall
Kaitaia	Cfb	23.6 °C (74.5 °F)	14.8 °C (58.6 °F)	15.4 °C (59.7 °F)	8.5 °C (47.3 °F)	1,320 mm (52.0 in)
Whangārei	Cfb	24.6 °C (76.3 °F)	15.8 °C (60.4 °F)	15.5 °C (59.9 °F)	8.1 °C (46.6 °F)	1,289 mm (50.7 in)
Auckland	Cfb	23.9 °C (75.0 °F)	16.1 °C (61.0 °F)	14.6 °C (58.3 °F)	7.7 °C (45.9 °F)	1,119 mm (44.1 in)
Tauranga	Cfb	24.3 °C (75.7 °F)	15.3 °C (59.5 °F)	14.6 °C (58.3 °F)	6.3 °C (43.3 °F)	1,202 mm (47.3 in)
Hamilton	Cfb	24.6 °C (76.3 °F)	12.8 °C (55.0 °F)	14.1 °C (57.4 °F)	3.8 °C (38.8 °F)	1,124 mm (44.3 in)
Rotorua	Cfb	22.9 °C (73.2 °F)	12.6 °C (54.7 °F)	12.0 °C (53.6 °F)	3.7 °C (38.7 °F)	1,356 mm (53.4 in)
Gisborne	Cfb	25.8 °C (78.4 °F)	14.3 °C (57.7 °F)	14.7 °C (58.5 °F)	5.5 °C (41.9 °F)	1,001 mm (39.4 in)
Taupō	Cfb	23.0 °C (73.4 °F)	11.6 °C (52.9 °F)	11.1 °C (52.0 °F)	2.5 °C (36.5 °F)	948 mm (37.3 in)
New Plymouth	Cfb	21.8 °C (71.2 °F)	13.4 °C (56.1 °F)	13.5 °C (56.3 °F)	5.9 °C (42.6 °F)	1,410 mm (55.5 in)
Napier	Cfb	24.7 °C (76.5 °F)	14.7 °C (58.5 °F)	14.5 °C (58.1 °F)	4.8 °C (40.6 °F)	790 mm (31.1 in)
Whanganui	Cfb	22.6 °C (72.7 °F)	14.1 °C (57.4 °F)	13.6 °C (56.5 °F)	5.8 °C (42.4 °F)	944 mm (37.2 in)
Palmerston North	Cfb	22.6 °C (72.7 °F)	13.1 °C (55.6 °F)	12.9 °C (55.2 °F)	4.7 °C (40.5 °F)	984 mm (38.7 in)
Masterton	Cfb	25.3 °C (77.5 °F)	12.1 °C (53.8 °F)	12.9 °C (55.2 °F)	3.1 °C (37.6 °F)	889 mm (35.0 in)
Wellington	Cfb	20.3 °C (68.5 °F)	13.7 °C (56.7 °F)	11.7 °C (53.1 °F)	6.7 °C (44.1 °F)	1,319 mm (51.9 in)
Nelson	Cfb	22.5 °C (72.5 °F)	13.7 °C (56.7 °F)	12.7 °C (54.9 °F)	2.6 °C (36.7 °F)	976 mm (38.4 in)
Blenheim	Cfb	23.4 °C (74.1 °F)	12.9 °C (55.2 °F)	13.3 °C (55.9 °F)	2.9 °C (37.2 °F)	639 mm (25.2 in)
Westport	Cfb	20.2 °C (68.4 °F)	12.6 °C (54.7 °F)	12.9 °C (55.2 °F)	4.9 °C (40.8 °F)	2,074 mm (81.7 in)
Kaikoura	Cfb	20.3 °C (68.5 °F)	12.9 °C (55.2 °F)	11.2 °C (52.2 °F)	5.6 °C (42.1 °F)	715 mm (28.1 in)
Hokitika	Cfb	19.5 °C (67.1 °F)	12.0 °C (53.6 °F)	12.0 °C (53.6 °F)	3.1 °C (37.6 °F)	2,921 mm (115.0 in)
Christchurch	Cfb	22.5 °C (72.5 °F)	11.8 °C (53.2 °F)	11.2 °C (52.2 °F)	0.7 °C (33.3 °F)	618 mm (24.3 in)
Mount Cook	Cfb	20.4 °C (68.7 °F)	8.7 °C (47.7 °F)	7.2 °C (45.0 °F)	−2.2 °C (28.0 °F)	4,132 mm (162.7 in)
Lake Tekapo	Cfb	22.2 °C (72.0 °F)	8.5 °C (47.3 °F)	6.6 °C (43.9 °F)	−2.8 °C (27.0 °F)	535 mm (21.1 in)
Timaru	Cfb	20.1 °C (68.2 °F)	11.4 °C (52.5 °F)	10.1 °C (50.2 °F)	0.6 °C (33.1 °F)	543 mm (21.4 in)
Milford Sound	Cfb	19.5 °C (67.1 °F)	10.7 °C (51.3 °F)	9.3 °C (48.7 °F)	1.6 °C (34.9 °F)	6,545 mm (257.7 in)
Queenstown	Cfb	22.0 °C (71.6 °F)	9.9 °C (49.8 °F)	8.6 °C (47.5 °F)	−1.4 °C (29.5 °F)	721 mm (28.4 in)
Alexandra	Cfb/BSk	24.0 °C (75.2 °F)	10.1 °C (50.2 °F)	7.9 °C (46.2 °F)	−2.2 °C (28.0 °F)	365 mm (14.4 in)
Manapouri	Cfb	20.7 °C (69.3 °F)	8.6 °C (47.5 °F)	8.7 °C (47.7 °F)	−0.4 °C (31.3 °F)	1,126 mm (44.3 in)
Dunedin	Cfb	18.9 °C (66.0 °F)	11.6 °C (52.9 °F)	10.8 °C (51.4 °F)	3.0 °C (37.4 °F)	724 mm (28.5 in)
Invercargill	Cfb	18.9 °C (66.0 °F)	9.5 °C (49.1 °F)	10.0 °C (50.0 °F)	1.1 °C (34.0 °F)	1,097 mm (43.2 in)
Chatham Islands	Cfb	19.2 °C (66.6 °F)	12.1 °C (53.8 °F)	12.0 °C (53.6 °F)	5.6 °C (42.1 °F)	837 mm (33.0 in)

=== Records ===
Record	Measurement	Location	Date
Highest temperature	42.4 °C (108.3 °F)	Rangiora, Canterbury	7 February 1973
Lowest temperature	−25.6 °C (−14.1 °F)	Ranfurly, Otago	17 July 1903
Highest rainfall in an hour	134 mm (5.3 in)	Cropp River, West Coast	8 January 2004
Highest rainfall in 24 hours	758 mm (29.8 in)	Cropp River, West Coast	27–28 December 1989
Highest rainfall in a calendar year	16,617 mm (654.2 in)	Cropp River, West Coast	1998
Lowest rainfall in a calendar year	212 mm (8.3 in)	Alexandra, Otago	1964
Highest wind gust	250 km/h (155 mph)	Mount John, Canterbury	18 April 1970
Highest sunshine in a month	359 hours	New Plymouth, Taranaki	January 2022
Highest sunshine in a calendar year	2840 hours	Richmond, Tasman	2019
Lowest sunshine in a month	25 hours	Otautau, Southland	July 1985
Lowest sunshine in a calendar year	971 hours	Franz Josef, West Coast	1991

=== Annual extremes ===
Year	Hottest	Coldest	Wettest	Driest	Windiest
2018	38.7 °C (101.7 °F); Alexandra; 30 January	−10.4 °C (13.3 °F); Mount Cook Airport; 3 June	9,817 mm (386.5 in); Cropp River	526 mm (20.7 in); Clyde	197 km/h (122 mph); Akitio; 21 May
2019	38.4 °C (101.1 °F); Hanmer Forest; 31 January	−9.2 °C (15.4 °F); Lake Tekapo; 3 June	14,227 mm (560.1 in); Cropp River	417 mm (16.4 in); Clyde / Cromwell	197 km/h (122 mph); Cape Turnagain; 15 May
2020	38.2 °C (100.8 °F); Gisborne; 31 January	−12.3 °C (9.9 °F); Middlemarch; 14 June	11,532 mm (454.0 in); Cropp River	205 mm (8.1 in); Hakataramea Valley	198 km/h (123 mph); Cape Turnagain; 31 January
2021	39.4 °C (102.9 °F); Ashburton; 26 January	−10.8 °C (12.6 °F); Tara Hills (Omarama); 27 May	14,090 mm (555 in); Cropp River	402 mm (15.8 in); Alexandra	222 km/h (138 mph); Cape Turnagain; 10 September
2022	34.7 °C (94.5 °F); Lake Karapiro; 3 January	−11.6 °C (11.1 °F); Mount Cook Airport; 17 July	11,034 mm (434.4 in); Cropp River	368 mm (14.5 in); Roxburgh / Middlemarch	223 km/h (139 mph); Cape Turnagain; 14 June
2023	35.6 °C (96.1 °F); Middlemarch; 4 February	−10.6 °C (12.9 °F); Tara Hills (Omarama); 10 June	11,717 mm (461.3 in); Cropp River	359 mm (14.1 in); Ranfurly	246 km/h (153 mph); Cape Turnagain; 17 September
2024	37.0 °C (98.6 °F); Hanmer Forest; 5 February	−11.8 °C (10.8 °F); Lake Tekapo; 3 June	11,503 mm (452.9 in); Cropp River	354 mm (13.9 in); Alexandra / Bromley, New Zealand	198 km/h (123 mph); Cape Turnagain; 20 September
2025	35.6 °C (96.1 °F); Kawerau; 7 December	−12.9 °C (8.8 °F); Mount Cook Airport; 3 June	10,951 mm (431.1 in); Cropp River	307 mm (12.1 in); Alexandra	252 km/h (157 mph); Cape Turnagain; 21 October

== Historical climate ==
Data collection for determining the New Zealand climate began in the late 19th century, although European explorers made valid observations of climate indicators such as glaciers and moraines early in that century. Scientific study of early New Zealand climate is quite recent and ongoing. It has settled some of the debate regarding links between the Little Ice Age (LIA) in the Northern Hemisphere and the climate in New Zealand at the same time. The key facts to emerge are that New Zealand did experience a noticeable cooler climate, but at a slightly later date than in the Northern Hemisphere.

The onset of cooler climate was about 1450 and lasted until 1850. Indications are that temperatures were in the range of 1.5-2.0 degree Celsius lower than present during the New Zealand LIA. Since 2000 various scientific investigations looked at the behaviour of glaciers in relation to climate and found they were excellent indicators of temperatures, especially in summer. Glacial evidence of climate is matched by evidence of variations in tree ring growth and studies of ice core and ocean sediment samples indicating the types of microorganisms (some flourish in warm temperatures, other in cooler temperatures) and historical carbon dioxide ratios.

Evidence found that the climate was more strongly influenced by the impact of tropical air masses in warm periods and polar air masses in cool periods. Recent (2010) studies by Victoria University have shown that the regional climates most affected were in coastal Otago and Southland. The dominant temperature influence here was the relative warmth of the sea to the south of New Zealand during the Medieval Warm Period (MWP). From about 1350 this region was notably warmer but then cooled relatively quickly from 1450. This cooling may have had a substantial impact on population in those areas. The limited historical record suggests that from 1450 the population of New Zealand underwent significant cultural change which may have links to climate cooling and dramatic changes in food supplies.

== Climate change ==
Atmospheric carbon dioxide record from Baring Head, Wellington, from 1977 to present.

Climate change in New Zealand involves historical, current and future changes in the climate of New Zealand; and New Zealand's contribution and response to global climate change. Summers are becoming longer and hotter, and some glaciers have melted completely and others have shrunk. In 2021, the Ministry for the Environment estimated that New Zealand's gross emissions were 0.17% of the world's total gross greenhouse gas emissions. However, on a per capita basis, New Zealand is a significant emitter, the sixth highest within the Annex I countries, whereas on absolute gross emissions New Zealand is ranked as the 24th highest emitter.

More than half (53%) of New Zealand's gross greenhouse gas emissions are from agriculture, mainly methane from sheep and cow belches. Between 1990 and 2022, New Zealand's gross emissions (excluding removals from land use and forestry) increased by 14%. When the uptake of carbon dioxide by forests (sequestration) is taken into account, net emissions (including carbon removals from land use and forestry) increased by 33% since 1990.

Climate change is being responded to in a variety of ways by civil society and the New Zealand Government. This includes participation in international treaties and in social and political debates related to climate change. New Zealand has an emissions trading scheme, and in 2019 the government introduced the Climate Change Response (Zero Carbon) Amendment Bill which created a Climate Change Commission responsible for advising the government on policies and emissions budgets.

New Zealand made a number of pledges on climate change mitigation in 2019: to reduce net carbon emissions to zero by 2050, to plant 1 billion trees by 2028, and to bring pastoral agriculture (farmers) into an emissions price policy by 2025. Already in 2019, New Zealand banned new offshore oil and gas drilling and decided that climate change issues would be examined before every important decision. In early December 2020, Prime Minister Jacinda Ardern declared a climate change emergency and pledged that the New Zealand Government would be carbon neutral by 2025. Key goals and initiatives include requiring the public sector to buy only electric or hybrid vehicles, government buildings will have to meet new "green" building standards, and all 200 coal-fired boilers in public service buildings will be phased out. International assessments of New Zealand's climate change actions are either ranked as "low" on the Climate Change Performance Index or rated as "highly insufficient" by Climate Action Tracker.

== See also ==
- Nor'west arch
- Weather Channel (New Zealand)
- Climate change in New Zealand
