= Lauper Peak =

Mountain in New Zealand

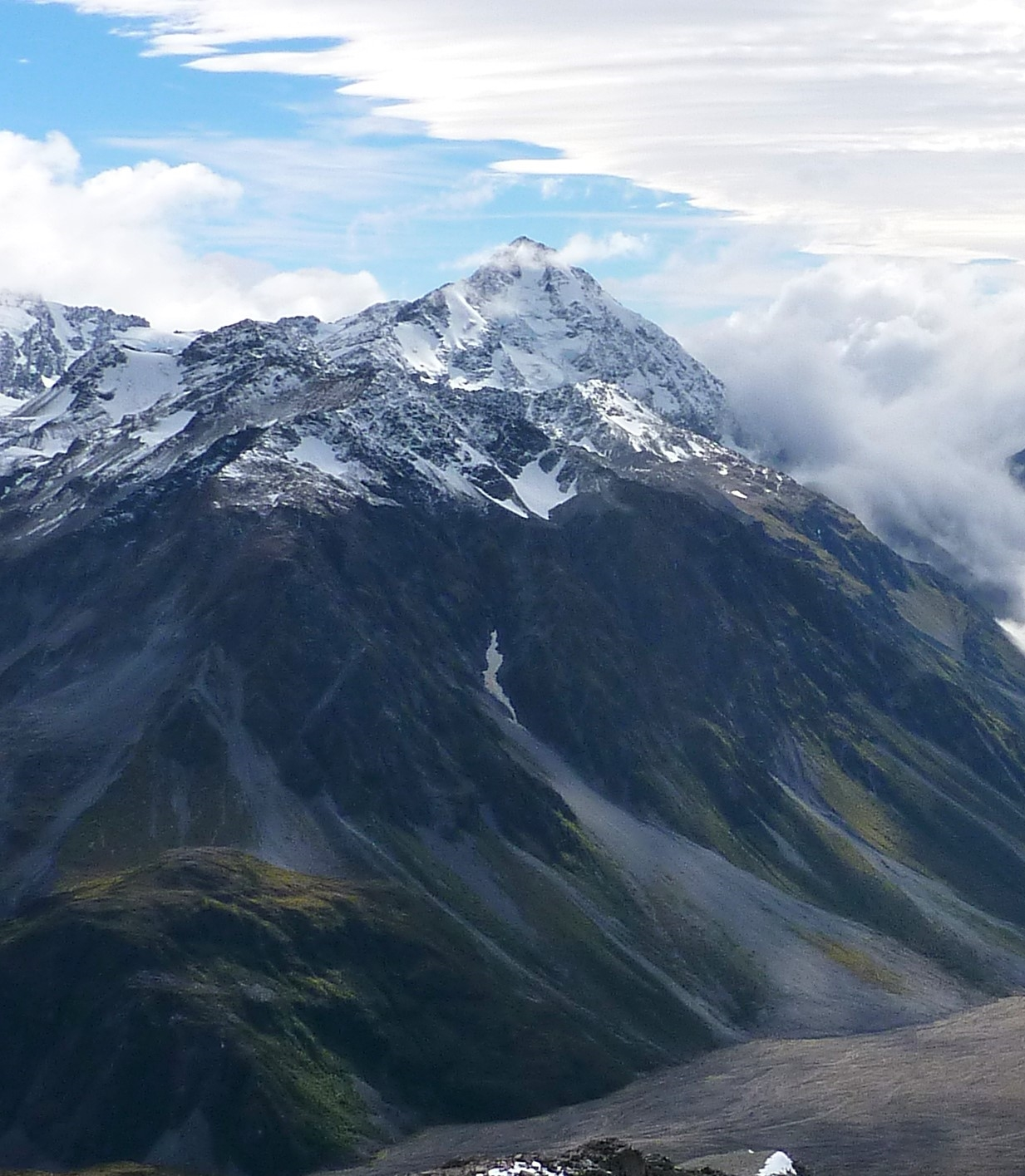
- South aspect

Highest point
- Elevation: 2,485 m (8,153 ft)
- Prominence: 434 m (1,424 ft)
- Isolation: 3.09 km (1.92 mi)
- Listing: New Zealand #79
- Coordinates: 43°13′37″S 170°56′52″E

Naming
- Etymology: Jakob Lauper

Geography
- Location within New Zealand
- Interactive map of Lauper Peak
- Location: South Island
- Country: New Zealand
- Region: Canterbury / West Coast
- Parent range: Southern Alps; Butler Range
- Topo map: Topo50 BW18

Climbing
- First ascent: January 1914

Lauper Peak is a 2,485-metre-elevation (8,153-foot) mountain in New Zealand.

== Description ==
Lauper Peak is located 140 kilometres (87 mi) west of Christchurch on the boundary shared by the Canterbury and West Coast Regions of the South Island. It is set on the crest or Main Divide of the Southern Alps, where it is the highest peak of the Butler Range. Precipitation runoff from the mountain's northeast slope drains into the headwaters of the Whitcombe River, whereas all other slopes drain to the Rakaia River. Topographic relief is significant as the summit rises 1,400 metres (4,593 feet) above Lauper Stream in two kilometres, and 1,625 metres (5,331 feet) above the Rakaia Valley in five kilometres. The nearest higher peak is Mount Whitcombe, three kilometres to the west-northwest.

== Eponymy ==
Jakob Lauper (1815–1891) was a Swiss mountain guide from the village of Giffers, Switzerland, who accompanied Henry Whitcombe, a surveyor for the Canterbury Provincial Council. They were tasked with investigating a pass near the headwaters of the Rakaia River. During this expedition, for which they were ill-prepared, Whitcombe drowned in the Taramakau River when crossing it in May 1863. This event resulted in Julius von Haast naming the pass the pair had travelled Whitcombe Pass, as well as a mountain, Mount Whitcombe. When George John Roberts (Chief Surveyor in Westland) mapped the Rakaia headwaters during the 1880s, he named the peak west of Whitcombe Pass after Jakob Lauper. This mountain's toponym has been officially approved by the New Zealand Geographic Board.

== Climbing ==
The first ascent of the summit was made in January 1914 by Fred Kitchingham, Charles Ward, and Lawrence Gooch.

Climbing routes with the first ascents:

- East Ridge – Fred Kitchingham, Charles Ward, Lawrence Gooch – (1914)
- North Ridge – Brian Olsen, Charlie Ledbrook – (1966)
- West Face – Hugh Fyson, Ray Molineux – (1966)
- South West Ridge
- South East Ridge

== Climate ==
Based on the Köppen climate classification, Lauper Peak is located in a marine west coast (Cfb) climate zone, with a subpolar oceanic climate (Cfc) at the summit. Prevailing westerly winds blow moist air from the Tasman Sea onto the mountains, where the air is forced upward by the mountains (orographic lift), causing moisture to drop in the form of rain or snow. This climate supports the Ramsay and Sale glaciers on the slopes of the peak. The months of December through February offer the most favourable weather for viewing or climbing this peak.

== Gallery ==
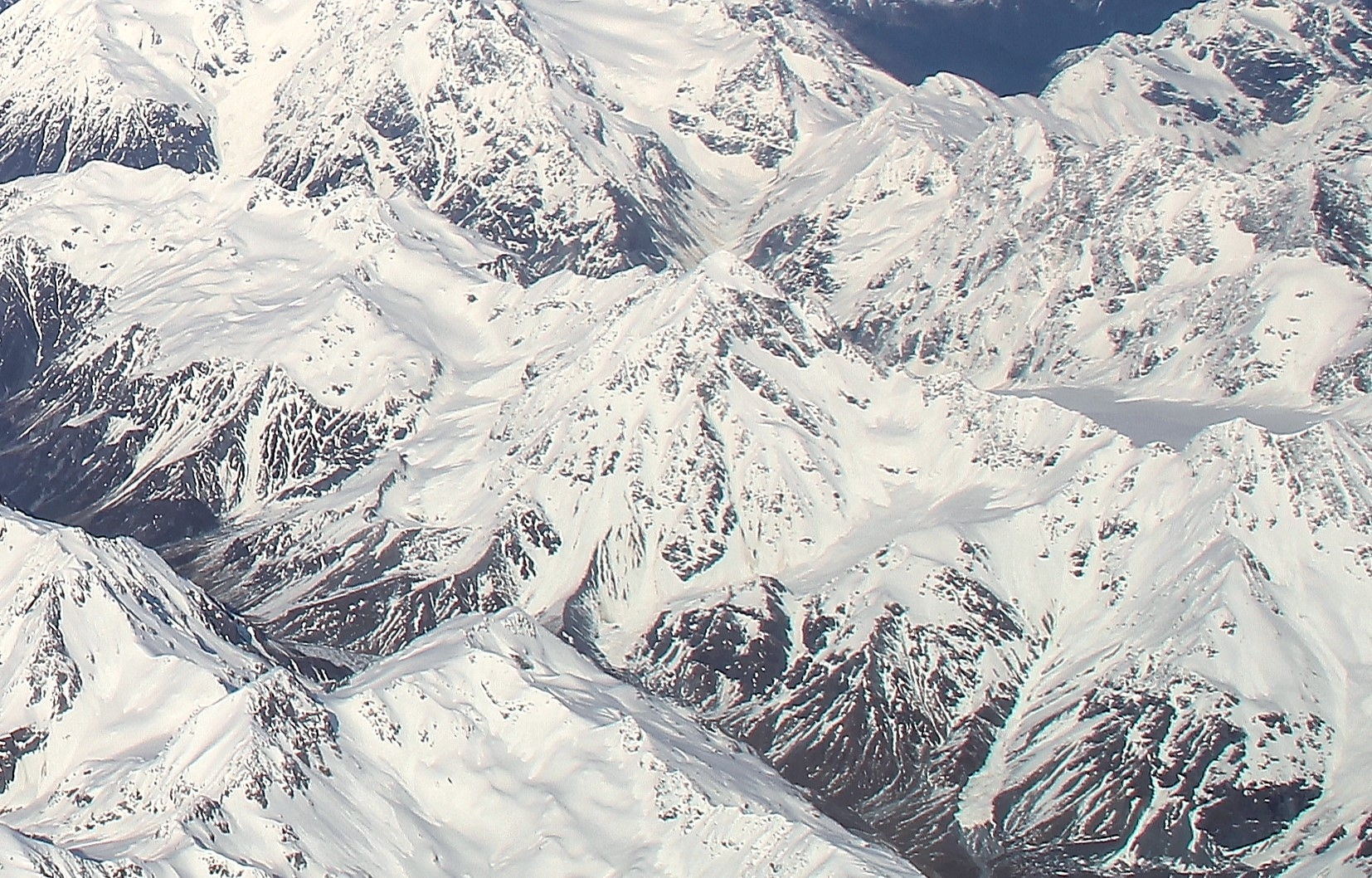
Northeast aspect centred

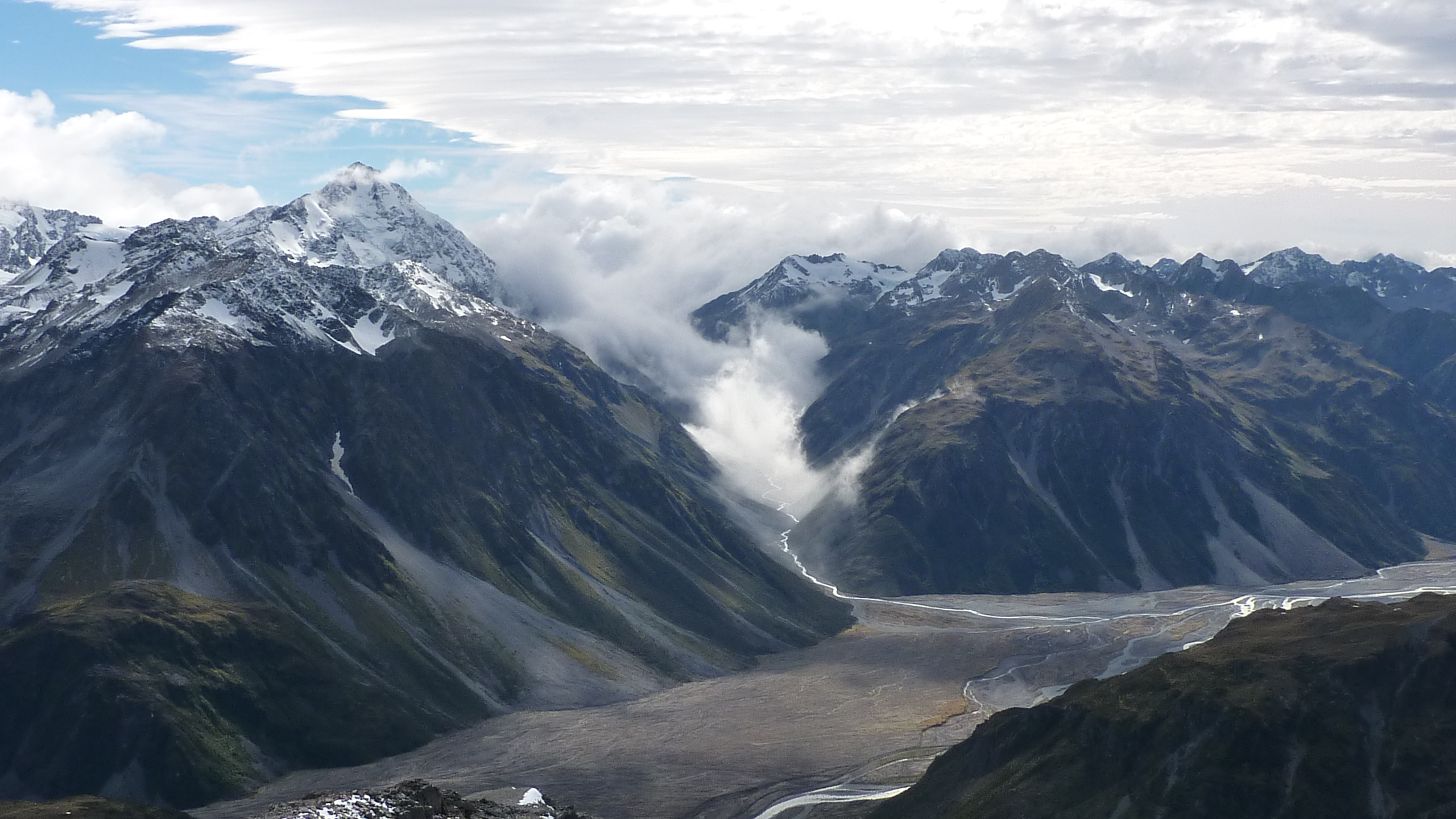
South aspect of Lauper Peak (left) rises above the Rakaia River Valley, with Whitcombe Pass filled with clouds.

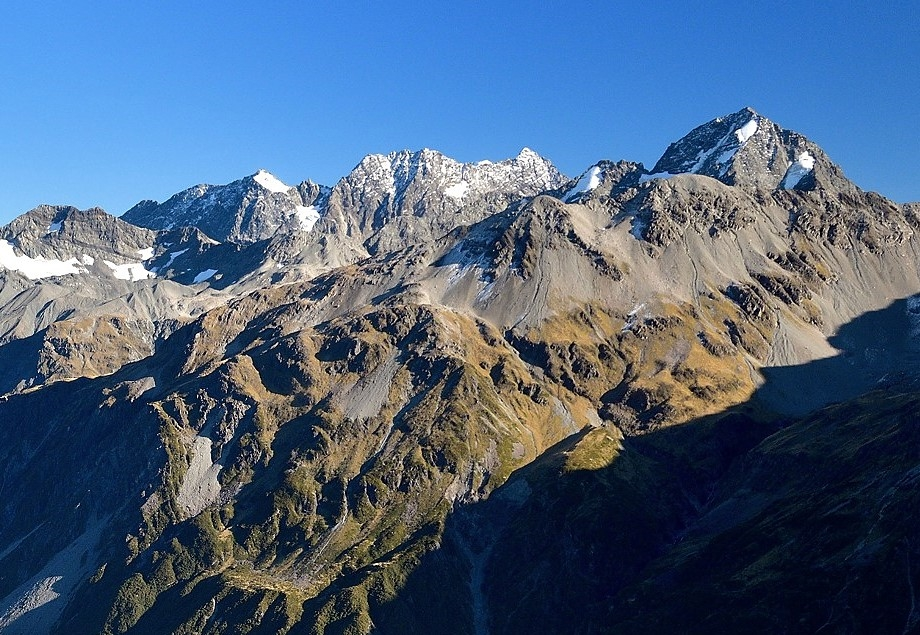
Southeast aspect of Mount Whitcombe centred on skyline with Lauper Peak in upper right corner.

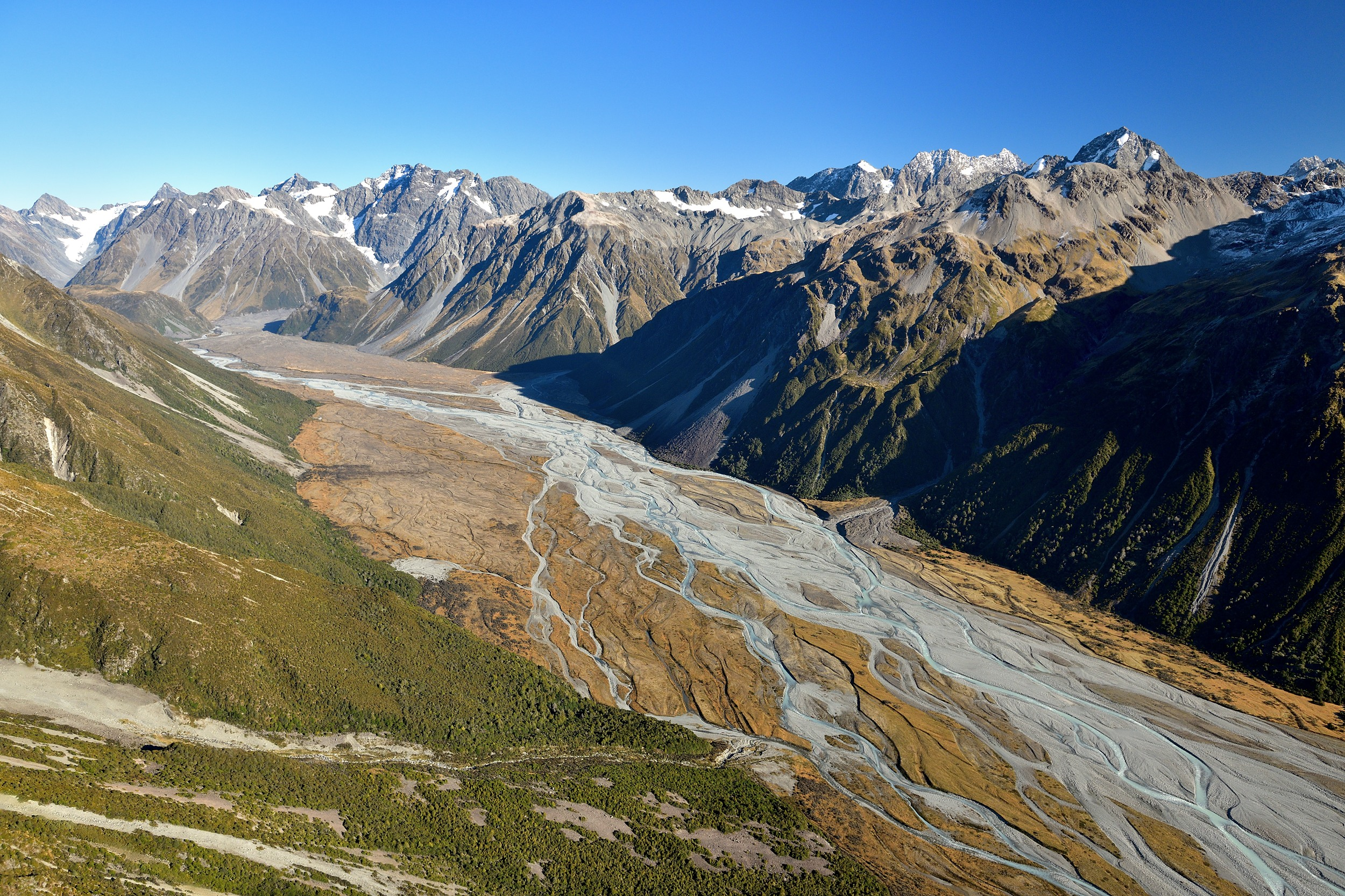
East aspect of Lauper Peak in upper right above Rakaia River Valley.

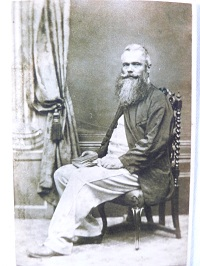
Jakob Lauper

== See also ==
- List of mountains of New Zealand by height
