= Mount Whitcombe (New Zealand) =

Mountain in New Zealand

- Location within New Zealand

Highest point
- Elevation: 2,650 m (8,690 ft)
- Coordinates: 43°12′57″S 170°54′46″E

Geography
- Location: Location in New Zealand
- Parent range: Southern Alps

Climbing
- Easiest route: glacier/snow/ice climb

Mount Whitcombe is a mountain in New Zealand's Southern Alps / Kā Tiritiri o te Moana, rising to a height of 2,650 metres (8,690 ft).

== Geography ==
Mount Whitcombe lies in the Southern Alps of the South Island. It is one of three mountains (along with Malcolm Peak and Mount Evans) which lie at the headwaters of the Rakaia, Wanganui, and Whitcombe Rivers. On the eastern side, the Ramsay Glacier feeds into the Rakaia River, and lies under the 1,500 metres (4,900 ft) Ramsay Face. The peak of Mount Whitcombe forms part of the boundary between the Canterbury and West Coast Regions.

== Eponymy ==
Mount Whitcome was named after John Henry Whitcombe who was a surveyor for the Canterbury Provincial Council in 1862. Whitcombe, along with Jacob Lauper a Swiss Guide, were tasked with investigating a pass at the Rakaia headwaters 4.6 kilometres (2.9 mi) east of the mountain. During this expedition, in which the pair were ill-prepared, Whitcombe was swept into the Taramakau River and drowned. This tragic event resulted in Julius von Haast naming the pass the pair travelled, along with the mountain, Mount Whitcombe.

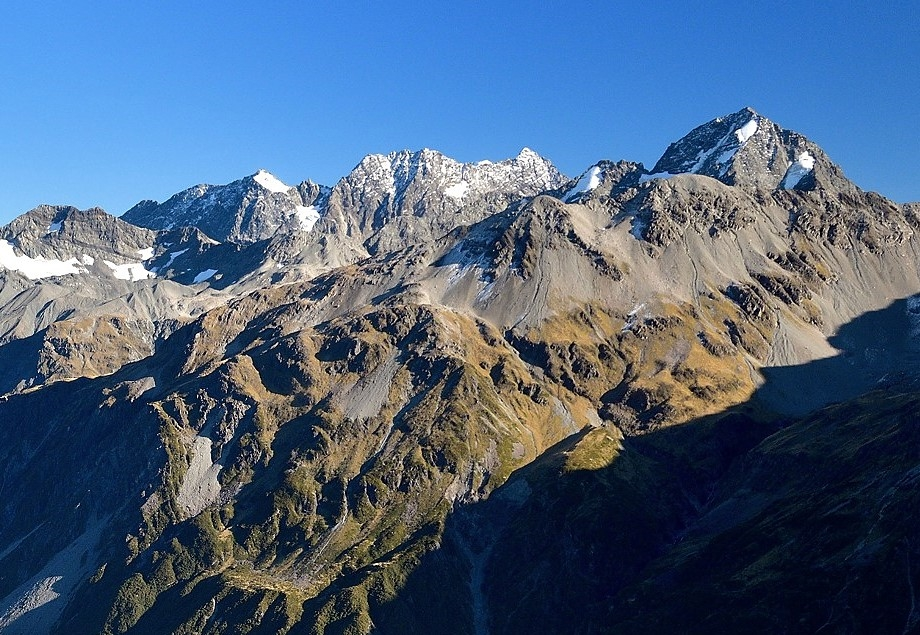
Southeast aspect of Mount Whitcombe centered on skyline. (Lauper Peak in upper right corner.)

== See also ==
- List of mountains of New Zealand by height
