= 2011 New Zealand snowstorms =

Snowfall affecting New Zealand

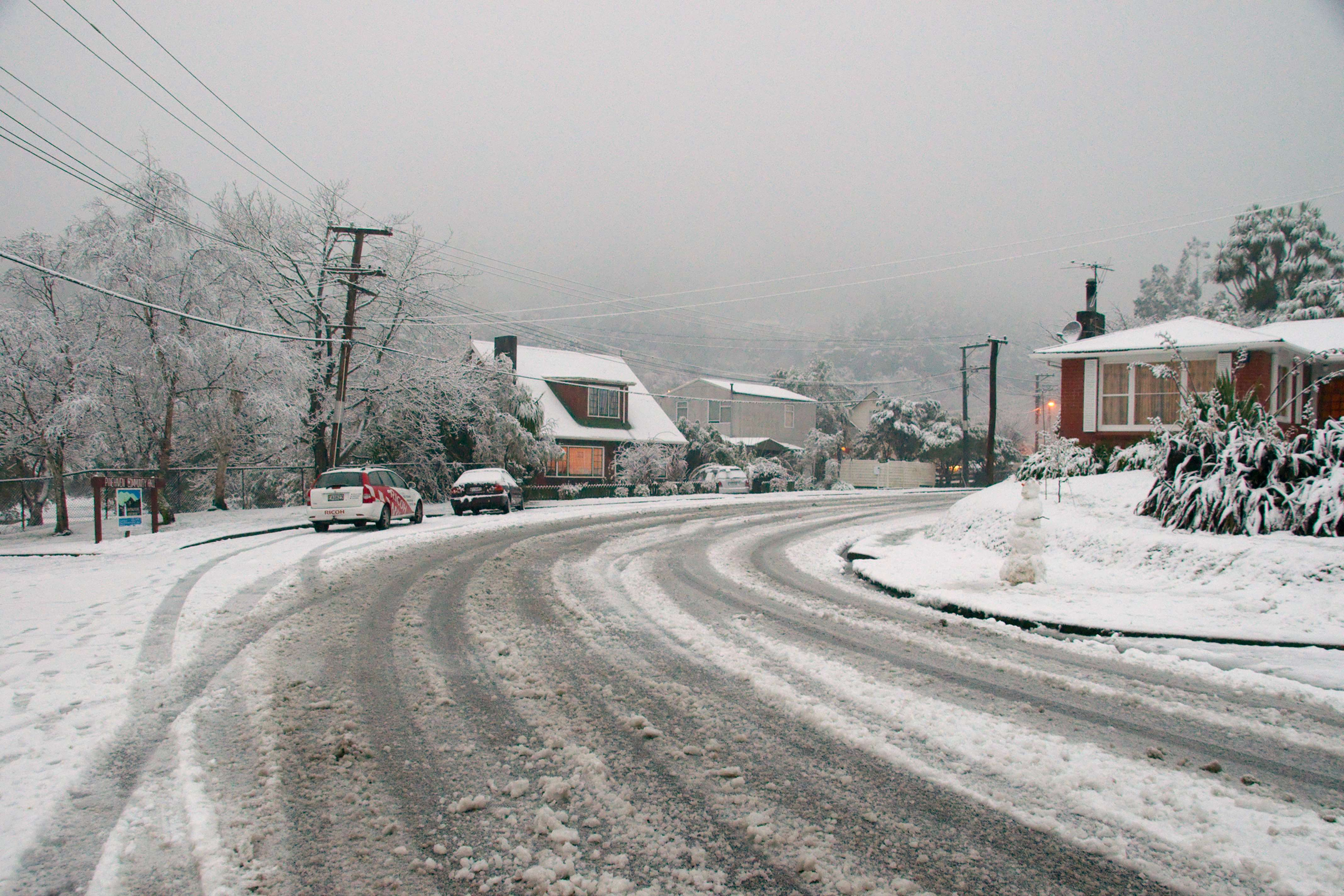
Snow in the Upper Hutt City suburb of Pinehaven during 16 August

The 2011 New Zealand snowstorms were a series of record-breaking snowfalls that affected both the North Island and South Island. The storms occurred over a few weeks, beginning on 25 July 2011 in the North Island and subsequently spreading to the South Island. The storms subsided in late July and returned in August. It was the worst winter storm to hit New Zealand in seventy years. The heavy snowfalls caused widespread closures in many cities, including Christchurch, Wellington, and Dunedin.

The South Island was the hardest hit, although the North Island was significantly affected, with the climatically mild cities of Auckland and Wellington reporting their first notable snowfall in over twenty years. The storms caused chaos around the country, leaving people stranded at airports, blocking state highways, and resulting in entire regions, particularly Canterbury and Otago, being completely closed. The initial storm in July was relatively short-lived, but returned in August. The winter storm also caused mixed precipitation.

The snowfall was caused by Antarctic storms which moved northward. A large high-pressure system had developed and stretched from Antarctica to the subtropics, where it had then merged with three neighbouring low-pressure systems, causing cold temperatures and heavy snowfall.

== 25 July 2011 ==
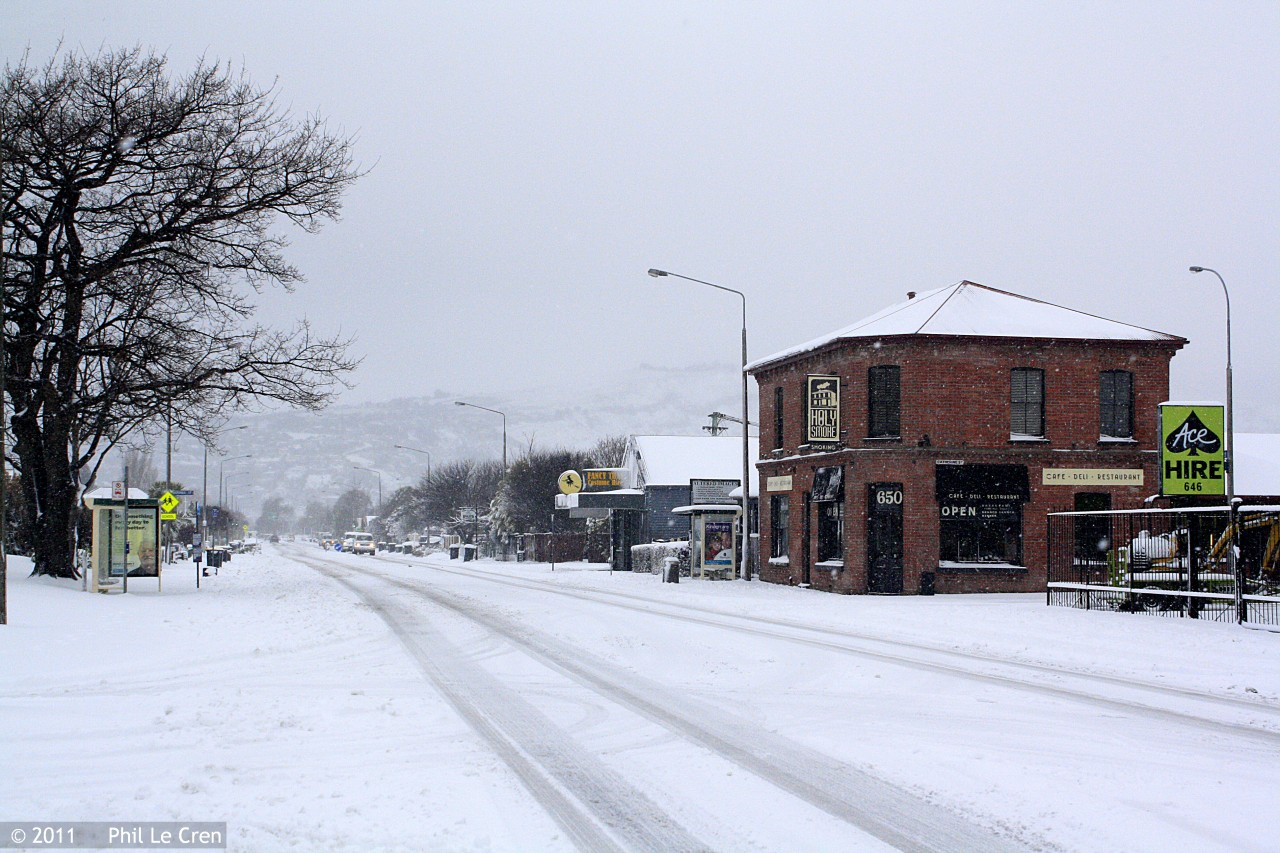
Snowfall in the Christchurch suburb of Woolston.

On 25 July 2011, New Zealand was gripped by its coldest winter snap in fifteen years. The lowest temperature set during the month was −10.2 °C (13.6 °F) at Manapouri (in the southwest corner of the South Island) on 26 July, which was a new record for the town. Christchurch Airport recorded its second-coldest day on 25 July. The severe winter storm was well predicted, with forecasters warning of the potential of heavy snow down to sea level in the south and east of the South Island and to low levels in the North Island. This snowstorm was especially threatening as it was the school holidays, and many people were travelling.

Up to 30 cm (12 in) of snow was recorded in parts of Christchurch, the heaviest recorded there in sixteen years. The snowfalls also flattened sand dunes in Brighton and completely coated nearby Sumner Beach. 1,700 homes within the Christchurch metropolitan area were without power. The city's bus service was also shut down for almost two days. Various highways were closed, including parts of State Highway 1 between Invercargill and Dunedin and State Highway 94, the road from Te Anau into Milford Sound. The storms lasted for roughly three days, before subsiding and returning early in the following month.

The snow in Christchurch led to the temporary closure of the city's airport. The Central City Red Zone was also closed to workers demolishing buildings affected by the February 2011 Christchurch earthquake.

== 14–15 August 2011 ==
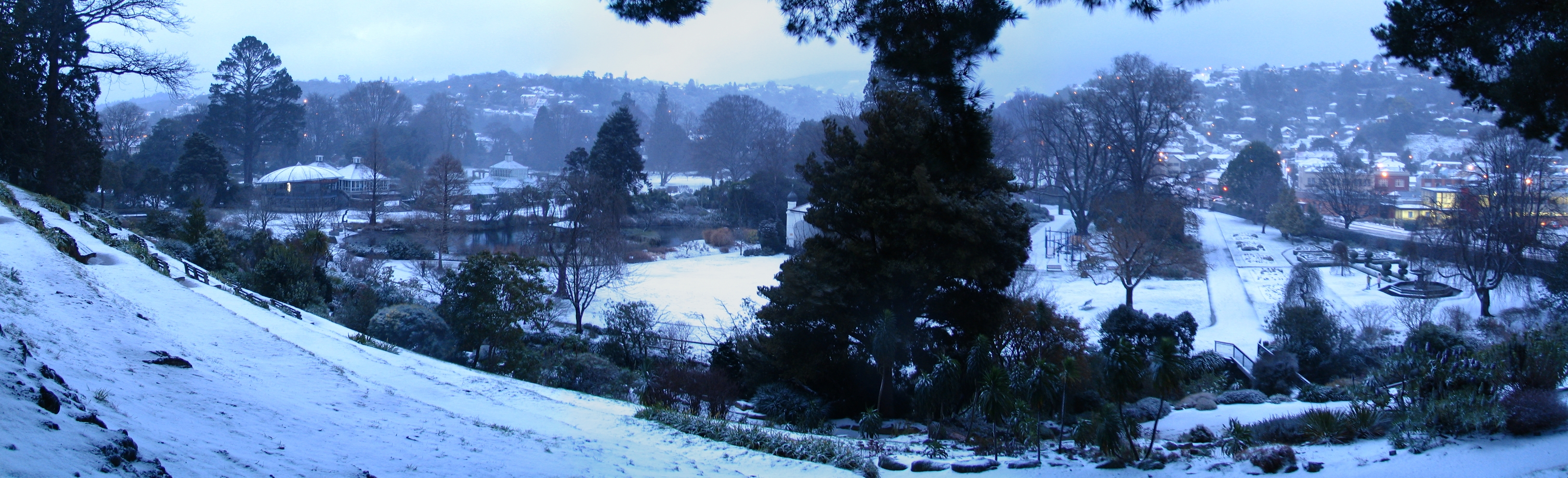
Snow-covered Dunedin Botanic Gardens on 14 August

A few days before this date, forecasters were warning of a severe snowstorm heading for New Zealand, even going as far as calling it the "perfect snowstorm". Snow fell consistently down to sea level in Wellington for the first time since 1976, and snow even fell for a brief time in Auckland for the first time in 80 years.

Much of the South Island was heavily blanketed, with schools closed in Queenstown, Dunedin, and Christchurch. The storms also caused airport closures in those centres. The Christchurch and Dunedin Donor Centres were closed and Westport and Mosgiel mobile collections were cancelled as a result of bad weather. The Canterbury Earthquake Recovery Authority (CERA) closed access to Christchurch's earthquake-damaged red zone due to potential safety hazards. The snow caused power outages in rural areas of Canterbury, namely Rakaia, Westmelton, Leeston and Greendale due to fallen tree branches. Power was lost to around 4,000 homes in South Taranaki, Manawatu, Whanganui, and Wairarapa. The heavy snow disrupted flights in and out of Wellington. Some schools were closed there due to the snow.

On 15 August, national electricity demand peaked at 6,902 megawatts, breaking the previous record of 6,635 MW set on 24 June 2007. The record would stand for nearly ten years before being broken by a peak demand of 6,924 MW on 29 June 2021.

Although Wellington received its largest snowfall in 30 years, the South Island received the most during the storms, with some regions receiving snowfall of up to 20–30 cm. The storm was reportedly the worst since 1939 when snow fell on the top of Maungawhau / Mount Eden and the outer suburbs of Auckland, a city which does not generally receive any snowfall. It took until August 2026 for Wellington to once again experience snowfall.

Two Wellington men, Nick Fone and Daniel McFadyen, claimed to be the first people to ski and snowboard down Mount Kaukau when they took advantage of snow there.

== Impact ==
Many homes around the country were without power, due to trees falling on power lines. Widespread road closures occurred across the Otago region on the South Island. Many ski resorts were completely closed due to being covered in dangerous amounts of snow and suffering damage to infrastructure.

== See also ==
- Climate of New Zealand
- Meteorological Service of New Zealand Limited
