= Cropp River =

River in New Zealand

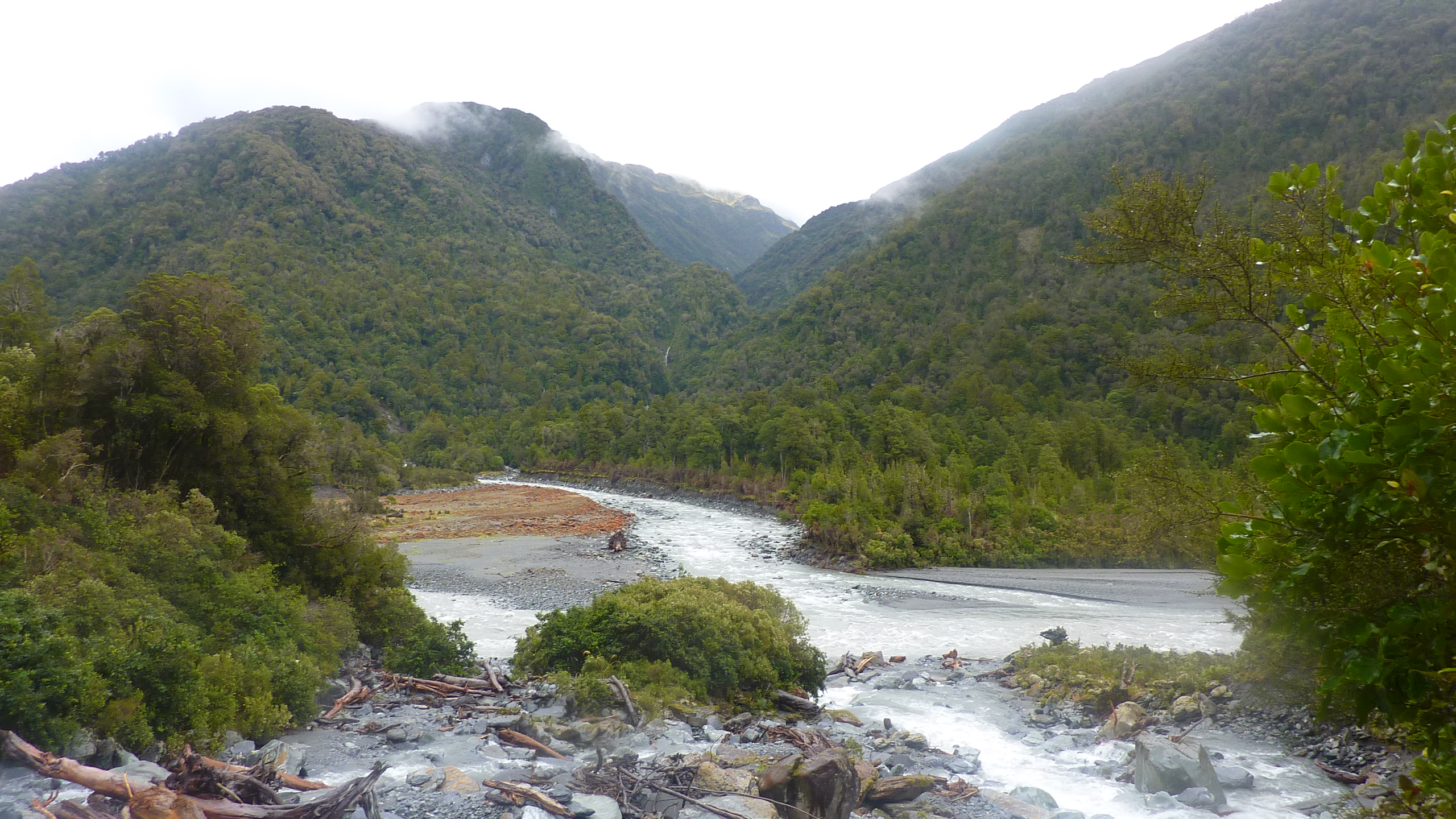
- Cropp River meets the Whitcombe River in the Foreground
- Route of the Cropp River
- Mouth of the Cropp River Cropp River (South Island)

Location
- Country: New Zealand
- region: West Coast Region
- District: Westland District

Physical characteristics
- Source: Galena Ridge
  - coordinates: 43°3′50″S 170°55′31″E
  - elevation: 1,640 m (5,380 ft)
- Mouth: Whitcombe River
  - coordinates: 43°4′0″S 171°1′36″E
  - elevation: 235 m (771 ft)
- Length: 10 kilometres (6.2 mi)

Basin features
- Progression: Cropp River → Whitcombe River → Hokitika River → Tasman Sea
- River system: Hokitika River

The Cropp River is a river of New Zealand. It flows east for 10 kilometres (6 mi) before joining the Whitcombe River, a tributary of the Hokitika River.

== Climate ==
On 25–26 March 2019, 1,086 millimetres (42.8 in) of rain fell over the Cropp River, a new record rainfall for a 48-hour period for New Zealand.

Climate data for Cropp River (1981–2010)
Month	Jan	Feb	Mar	Apr	May	Jun	Jul	Aug	Sep	Oct	Nov	Dec	Year
Average rainfall mm (inches)	1,117 (44.0)	696 (27.4)	872 (34.3)	866 (34.1)	917 (36.1)	897 (35.3)	680 (26.8)	846 (33.3)	967 (38.1)	1,240 (48.8)	1,007 (39.6)	1,288 (50.7)	11,393 (448.5)
Source: NIWA

== See also ==
- List of rivers of New Zealand
