= Butler Range (Canterbury) =

Mountain range in Canterbury, New Zealand

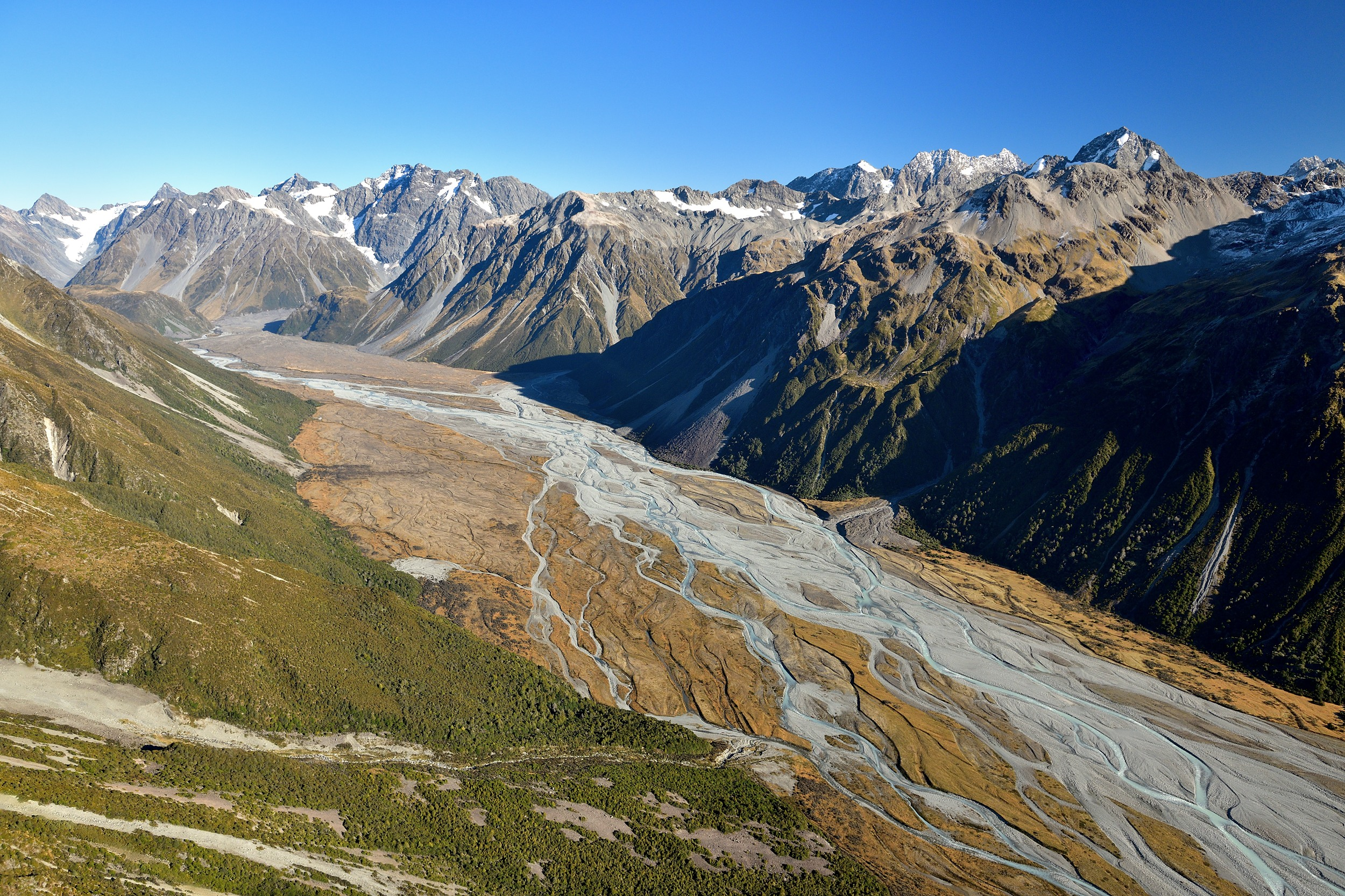
- Butler Range (top centre) to the right of the Rakaia River

Highest point
- Elevation: 2,485 m (8,153 ft)

Geography
- Country: New Zealand
- Region: Canterbury
- Range coordinates: 43°14′13″S 170°55′59″E

The Butler Range is a range located in the Ashburton District of Canterbury on the South Island of New Zealand. To the south of the range is the Rakaia River. The area was first farmed by Samuel Butler, who called his holding Mesopotamia Station. The highest peak of Butler Range is Lauper Peak at 2,485 metres (8,153 ft), named after the Swiss-born explorer Jakob Lauper. Mount Butler (2,103 metres or 6,900 feet) is located further south in the Butler Range and is also named after Samuel Butler.
