= Weather Channel (New Zealand) =

New Zealand television channel

- Type: Satellite network (Weather/meteorology)
- Country: New Zealand
- Availability: National;
- Owner: SKY Network Television Limited
- Launch date: 2001
- Dissolved: January 28, 2015
- SKY TV: Channel 098 (SD)
- Official website: sky.co.nz/weather

Weather Channel was a 24-hour interactive channel with updated New Zealand weather information operated by MetService which was broadcast on channel 098 on SKY TV. The service provided in-depth region-specific information for 27 New Zealand cities updated every few minutes, isobaric charts, weather radars, marine reports and live satellite maps.

The channel was announced by Sky as early as April 2001, with the implementation of its Open TV interactive service by May. At launch, the channel had a sponsorship agreement with AMI, which had done so for its analogue counterpart for two years.
