= 1936 New Zealand cyclone =

New Zealand meteorological event

The 1936 New Zealand Cyclone was an unnamed tropical cyclone originating near the Solomon Islands that struck New Zealand on 1 February 1936 causing widespread flooding and destruction. The cyclone claimed at least 12 lives in New Zealand.

== Origins and track ==
The cyclone formed south of the Solomon Islands on 28 January 1936. It then travelled southeast where it met with a cold front which caused it to intensify prior to hitting the North Island of New Zealand on 1 February. On 1 February it was centred near Norfolk Island. During the night it increased in speed and intensity, with the centre passing over Auckland. By 9 am on 2 February, it was centred near Kawhia and by Monday, 3 February the storm centre had passed over the Chatham Islands. The barometer in Auckland dropped to 28.57 inHg (967 hPa) at the storm's peak.

== Impact ==
The cyclone brought heavy rain which caused every major river in the North Island to flood. Its winds destroyed buildings from Picton to Kaitaia, ripped up footpaths, and toppled thousands of trees. Power was lost, and roads and railway lines were cut throughout the island. There was flash flooding, with thousands of cattle and sheep drowned.

=== Whangārei ===
Whangārei township and its business district were flooded.

=== Auckland ===
In Auckland, 40 boats were sunk or driven ashore, trees were uprooted, roofs blown off houses, and windows blown in. The wind was estimated to have been gusting to 90 miles per hour (140 km/h).

=== Thames ===
There was severe flooding at Thames.

=== Manawatu and Wairarapa ===
The Manawatu and Wairarapa had the strongest southerly winds. Manakau, Kuku, and Levin houses were damaged by the winds.

In Palmerston North, many houses lost roofs, the showgrounds main stand lost its roof, the Fitzherbert Avenue sports ground stand lost its roof, power and telegraph poles were broken, trees were uprooted, St Chad's church and hall in Longburn were destroyed, a railway settlement hut was blown over injuring its occupant, a motor upholstery and paint shop was destroyed, and numerous shop windows were blown in. The Manawatu River reached 15 feet 9 inches (4.80 m) on its flood gauge, 3 inches (80 mm) more than the previous highest flood.

The Feilding aeroclub hangar and two aeroplanes were destroyed.

=== Wellington ===
The Rangatira struck an object while entering Wellington heads and was badly holed. The steamer John broke her moorings and was driven ashore near the Hutt River mouth.

== Deaths ==
Twelve people lost their lives.

- Auckland province: two men drowned – a mine caretaker at Waiomio and a young man at Kaitaia.
- Mangatangi: two men, F A Mikoz and Mr Smith, drowned.
- Masterton: two youths lost their lives, one while deer stalking, and the other while clearing storm damaged trees.
- Ngatea: A baker, J Montgomery, went missing near the Ngatea River, presumed drowned.
- New Plymouth: Mr W F McLeod and his son Angus on the launch Mokau were lost at sea.
- Palmerston North man, Benjamin Miller, was knocked from roof by roofing iron while attempting to repair the roof and died.
- Tararua Ranges: a tramper, Ralph Wood, died of exposure on 2 February.
- Thames: G F Webster died when a slip damming the Puhoi River gave way destroying his house.

== Aftermath ==
The intensity of the storm and its suddenness caused consternation in Auckland about the lack of warning. The local press questioned the ability of the weather bureau in Wellington to adequately cover the weather for Auckland and Northland. The Director of Meteorological Services, Dr Edward Kidson, responded that there was no way to know the changes to a storm at sea and regardless of where the service was based no better warning could have been given.
