= Whitcombe River =

River in New Zealand

Coordinates: 43°01′S 171°01′E

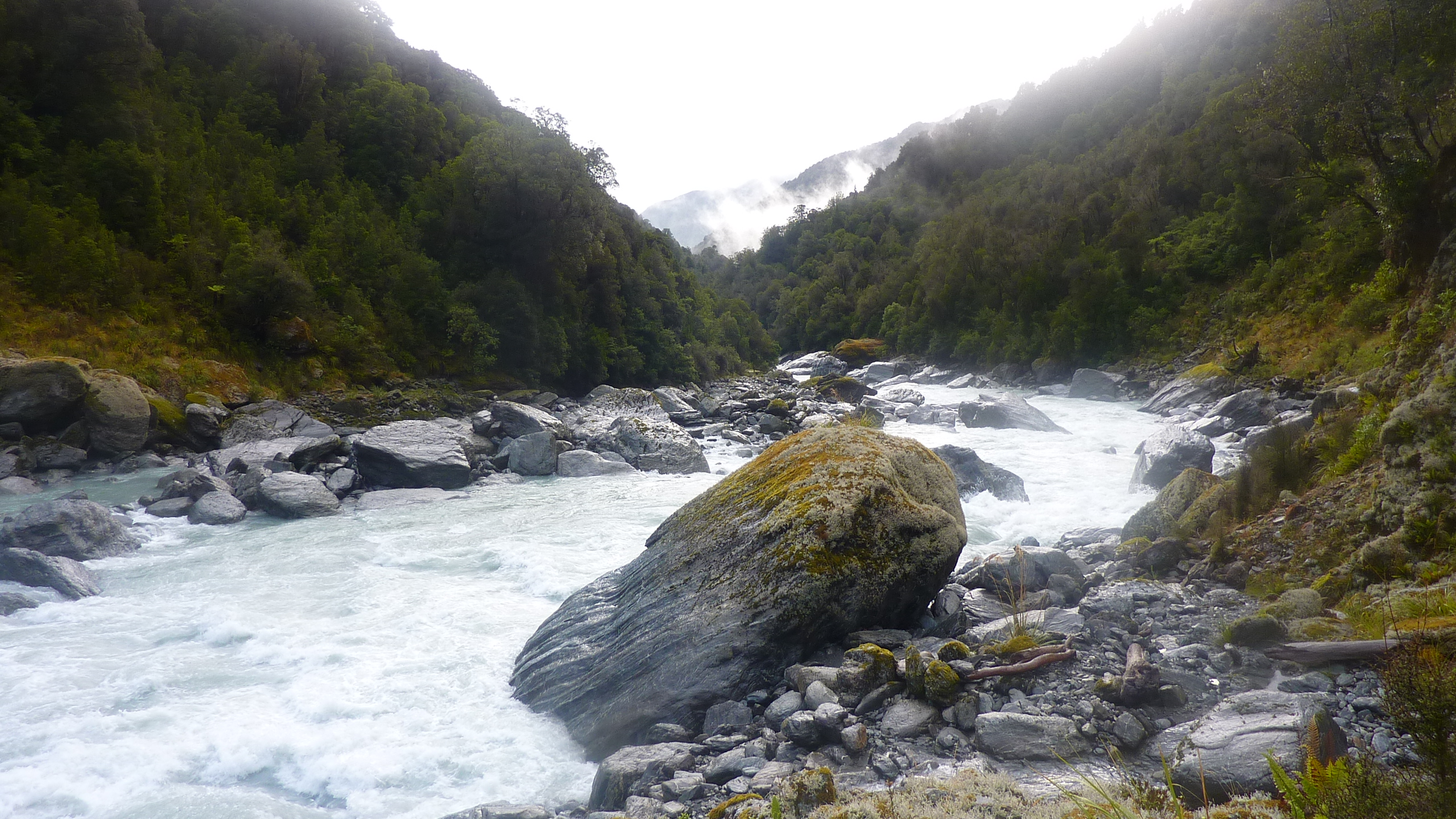
- Whitcombe River above Chairmans Flat New Zealand

Location
- Country: New Zealand

Physical characteristics
- Source
  - location: Southern Alps
- Mouth
  - location: Hokitika River
- Length: 24 km (15 mi)

The Whitcombe River is a river of the West Coast Region of New Zealand's South Island. It flows north to reach the Hokitika River 30 kilometres south of Hokitika.

== See also ==
- List of rivers of New Zealand
