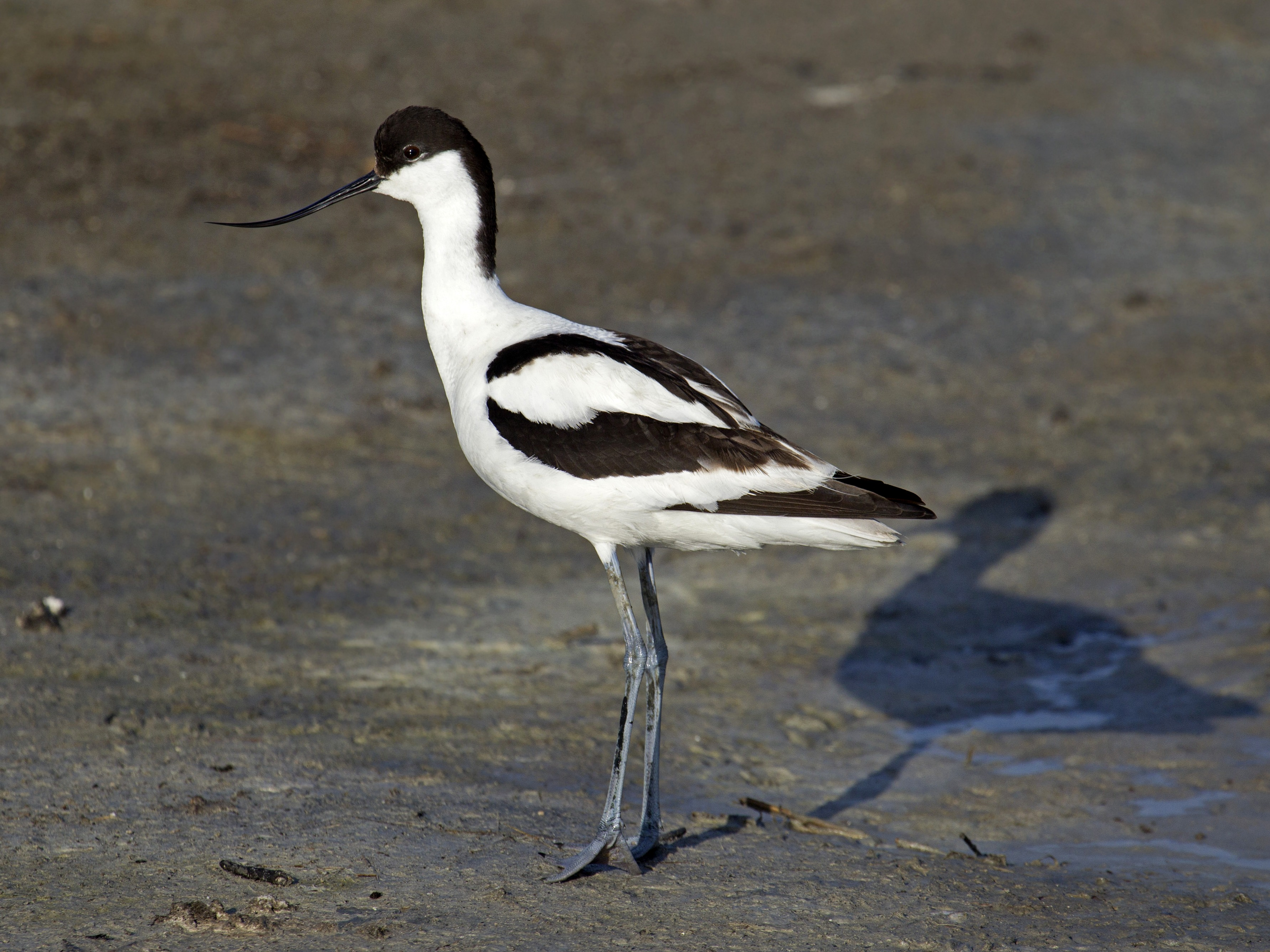

Conservation status
- Least Concern (IUCN 3.1)

Scientific classification
- Kingdom: Animalia
- Phylum: Chordata
- Class: Aves
- Order: Charadriiformes
- Family: Recurvirostridae
- Genus: Recurvirostra
- Species: R. avosetta

Binomial name
- Recurvirostra avosetta Linnaeus, 1758
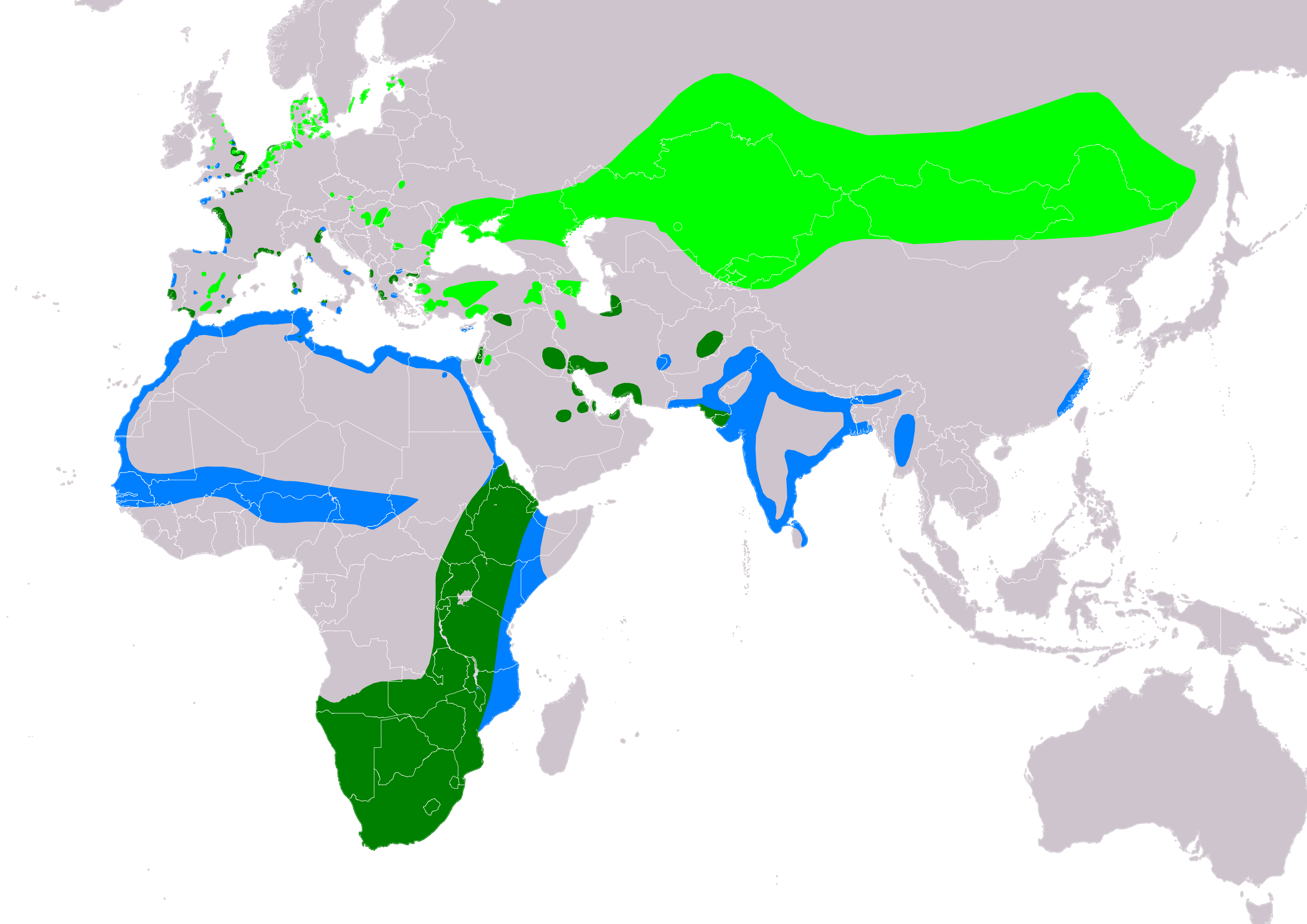
- Range of R. avosetta Breeding Resident Non-breeding

Audio
- Calls recorded in Suffolk, England

= Pied avocet =

Species of bird

The pied avocet (Recurvirostra avosetta) is a species of wader in the Recurvirostridae family, the only member of the avocet genus Recurvirostra found in Europe, Africa, and Asia.

This characteristic wader of coastal lagoons and marshes is easily recognisable by its long, upturned bill, long legs, and striking black-and-white plumage. Measuring approximately 40 cm (16 in) in length with a wingspan of about 70 cm (28 in), it is a relatively large species that feeds on various invertebrates in water and mudflats, captured using its distinctive bill. It typically nests in colonies of 10 to 70 pairs on islets or dikes near water, laying usually four eggs in a simple, shallow scrape in the sand. It is highly territorial when defending its chicks against conspecifics, or predators such as various raptors, corvids, and mammals. The pied avocet has a lifespan of about 20 years, with a record of 36 years.

The species has a wide distribution, spanning western Europe, central Asia, the Indian subcontinent, and Africa. Part of its population is migratory, undertaking long journeys south to its wintering grounds, while others are resident. In France, it is found along the English Channel, Atlantic coast, and Mediterranean, with northern populations joining in winter, while some individuals winter in Southern Europe or Africa.

Described by Carl Linnaeus in 1758, the pied avocet is one of four species in its genus, the others inhabiting different continents. Classified as Least Concern (LC) by the IUCN due to its extensive range and relatively large population, it nonetheless faces threats from anthropogenic factors such as habitat destruction, climate change, and pollution. Numerous scientific programs aim to better understand its biology, particularly its migratory routes, to enhance its protection.

== Description ==
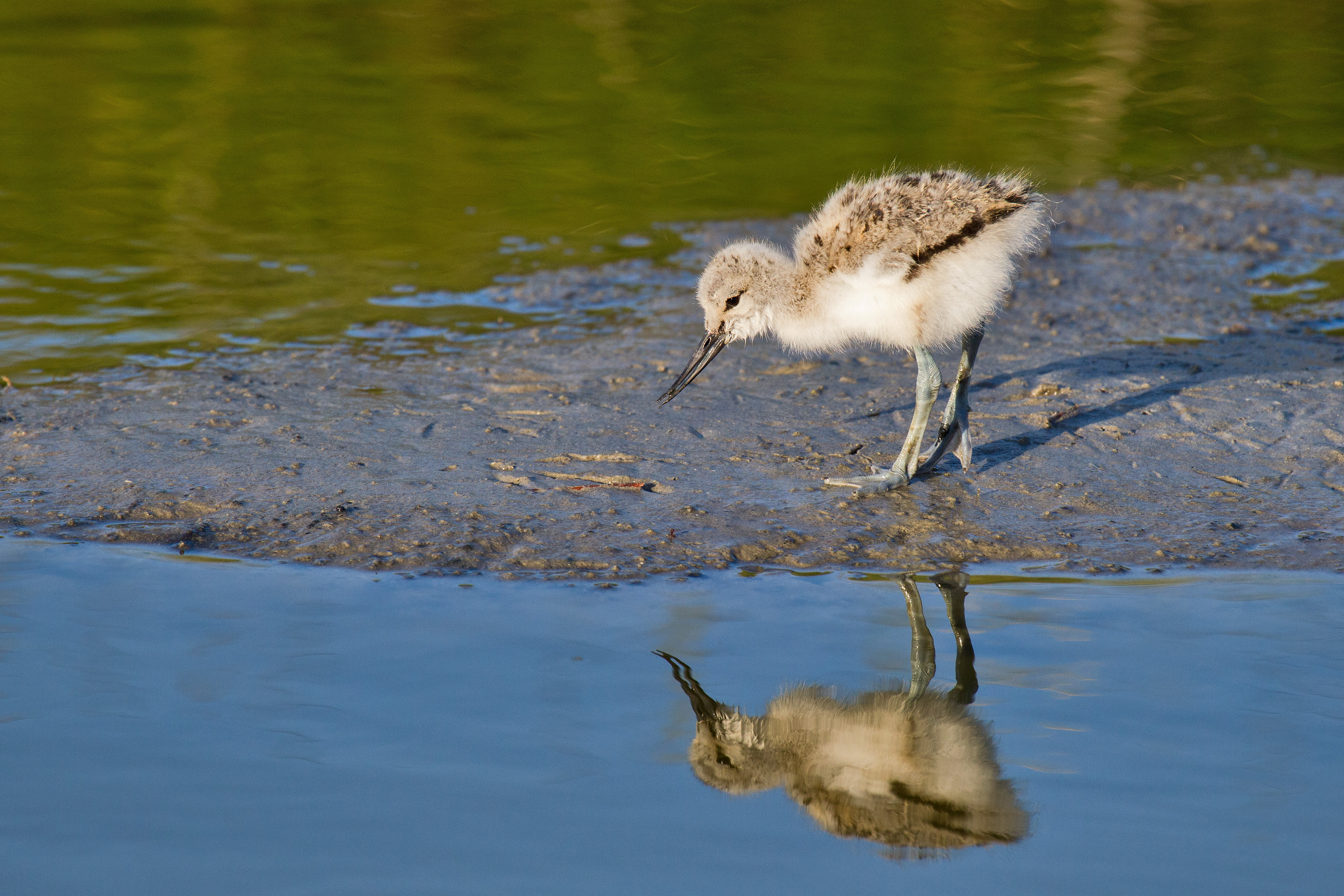
A chick near Oosterend, Texel island, the Netherlands

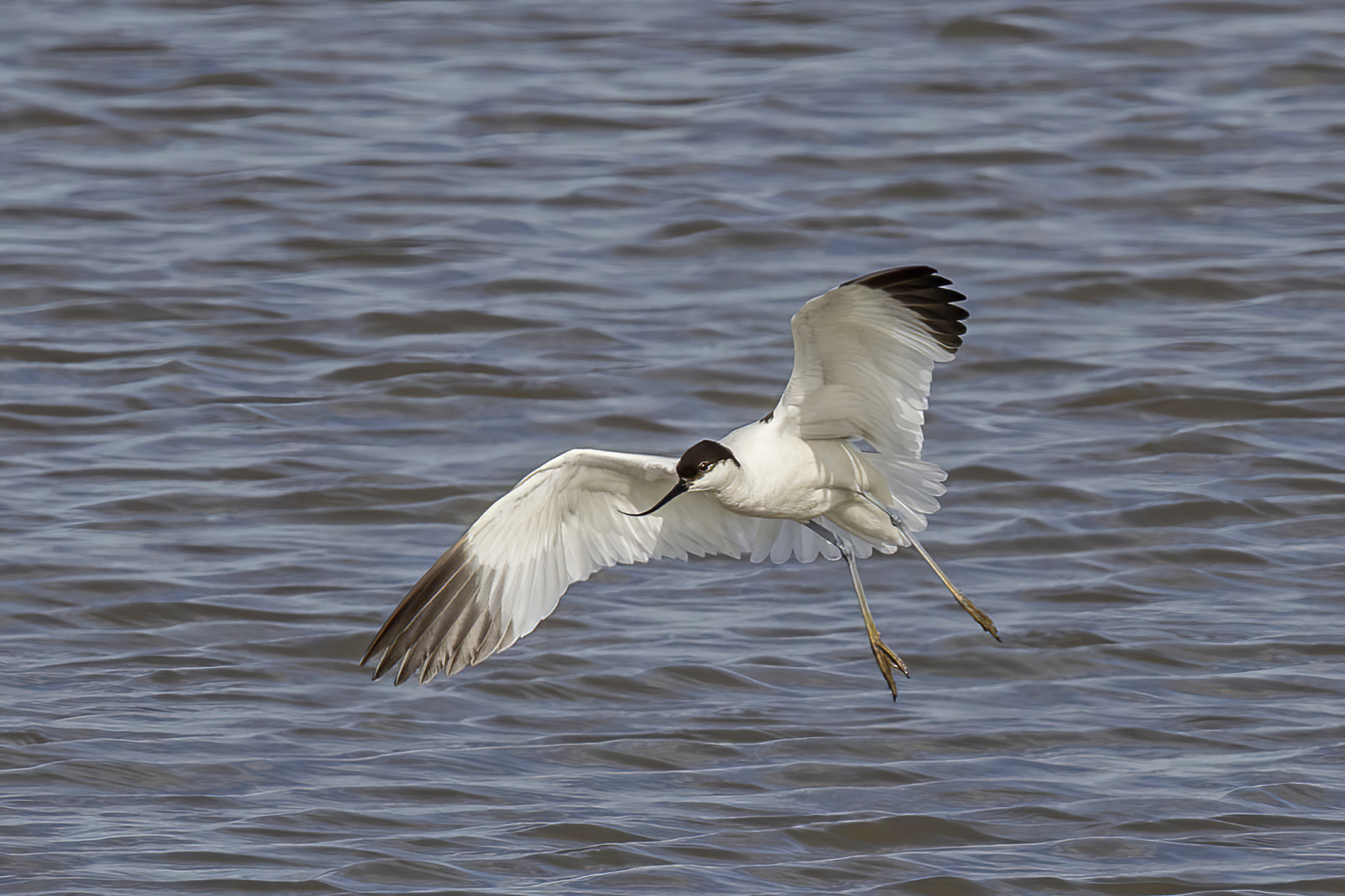
Landing in Norfolk, England

Adults have a striking black-and-white plumage, with a black cap extending to the back of the neck. The primaries are black, with the base of the inner primaries white, while the secondary coverts are dark grey. The rectrices are pale grey-brown in the middle and white elsewhere. The species shows no seasonal plumage variation. The tail is white, and the legs are bluish. The long, black beak is slender and upturned.

Sexual dimorphism is subtle and difficult to discern in the field. The male's bill is longer and less curved, while the female's is shorter and more distinctly curved. The black markings on the female's head may occasionally appear browner and less distinct. Males are generally larger than females, with a red or reddish-brown iris, while females have a hazel-brown iris.

In flight, the wingtips and shoulders are black, and the legs extend beyond the tail.

Chicks are covered in pale grey-brown down, finely speckled with black, with black patterns on the head, four rows of black spots on the back, and a white underbelly tinged yellowish at the neck and belly. Their iris is dark brown.

Juveniles have dingy grey wing coverts, with back and scapular feathers vermiculated with reddish-brown. Their legs are greyish. By their first summer, the primaries of juveniles appear very worn and brownish. After their first moult, which occurs by late September, juveniles resemble adults.

Two moults occur: a partial moult in February–March before breeding and a complete moult after breeding, from July to October.

=== Measurements ===
The pied avocet measures between 42 and 46 cm (17 and 18 in) in length, with a wingspan of 67 to 77 cm (26 to 30 in), occasionally up to 80 cm (31 in). The wing of an adult male measures 22 to 23.8 cm (8.7 to 9.4 in), while that of a female measures 21.9 to 24 centimetres (8.6 to 9.4 in).

The bill measures 8.2 to 9.1 cm (3.2 to 3.6 in) in males and is slightly shorter in females, ranging from 7.2 to 8.5 cm (2.8 to 3.3 in). The legs extend beyond 10 cm (3.9 in), with a tarsus of 8.5 to 9.4 cm (3.3 to 3.7 in) in males and 7.5 to 9.2 cm (3.0 to 3.6 in) in females. The tail measures 8 to 9 cm (3.1 to 3.5 in) in adult males and 7.8 to 8.7 cm (3.1 to 3.4 in) in adult females.

The weight ranges from 267 to 382 g (9.4 to 13.5 oz), with an average of 325 g (11.5 oz).

== Behaviour ==
Like all avocets, it forages in shallow brackish water or on mud flats, often scything its bill from side to side in water; a feeding technique unique to avocets. It mainly eats crustaceans and insects.

Its breeding habitat is shallow lakes with brackish water and exposed bare mud. It nests on open ground, often in small groups, sometimes with other waders. Three to five eggs are laid in a lined scrape or on a mound of vegetation.

=== Vocal behaviour ===
The contact and alarm calls, often emitted by adults when chicks are threatened, are a fluty whistle, sometimes plaintive, resembling plut-plut-plutt or klup-klup-klup. Paul Géroudet notes kvit-kvit-kvit when birds are excited, as well as krit-krit or kvèt. Near predators, avocets may emit kriyu. They also produce soft buk-buk during chick-rearing or glouglou... grrugrrugrru with mates during breeding.

=== Diet and feeding techniques ===
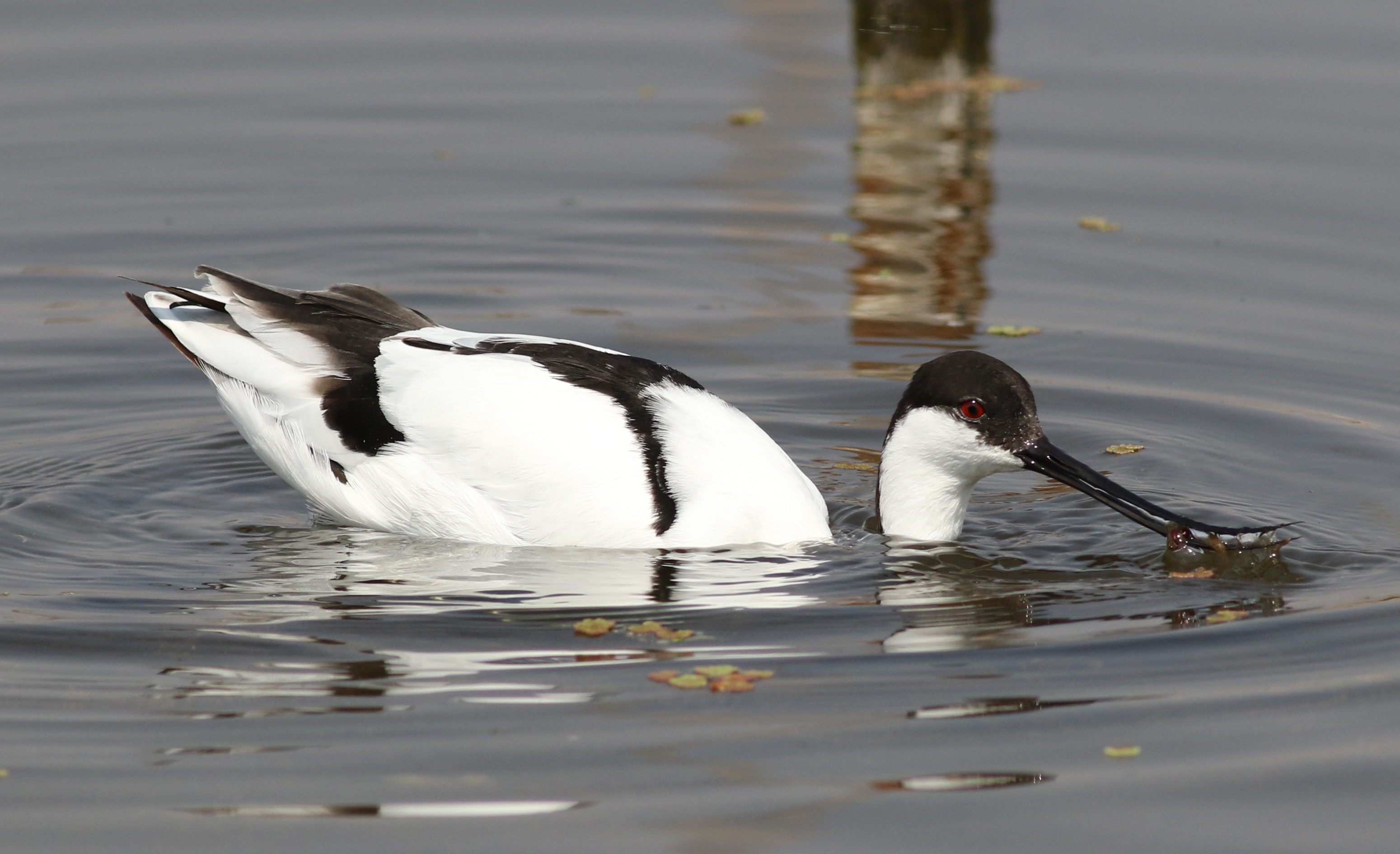
Feeding on small invertebrates with its curved bill.

The pied avocet primarily feeds on small benthic invertebrates, such as annelids, small crustaceans like Corophium, oligochaete and polychaete worms (e.g., Hediste diversicolor or Polydora species), and bivalve molluscs. It also consumes small insects (midges, beetles) measuring 4 to 15 mm (0.16 to 0.59 in). Daily food intake averages 150 g (5.3 oz) per individual.

Chironomid larvae are a key food source during breeding and wintering in salt marshes.

It occasionally eats small fish, seeds, and small roots.

It uses its bill to probe the sediment surface, making lateral pecks to find prey, or catches them by sight. In group feeding, lateral pecks are faster and nearly continuous. Adults feed in water depths of 4 to 10 cm (1.6 to 3.9 in). It may also peck on beaches or swim in deeper water, dipping its head like a duck. In groups, it may extend its neck, sweep its bill through the mud, and repeat the motion.

Locally, it may align its circadian rhythm with tides, feeding at night in salt marshes, such as in the Guérande Peninsula.

=== Philopatry ===
The pied avocet is philopatric. This has been demonstrated through ringing studies in Atlantic sites like the Gulf of Morbihan, Guérande Marshes, and Müllembourg Marshes on Noirmoutier Island, where some ringed birds returned to nest. Survival and return rates in the Atlantic range from 48–75% (average 58%) for first-year birds and 78–100% (average 90%) for adults, depending on the year.

Philopatry may explain increased breeding populations at some sites, as many new breeders are offspring from previous seasons. When sites reach capacity, new colonies form elsewhere, boosting populations.

=== Reproduction ===
==== Nest and eggs ====
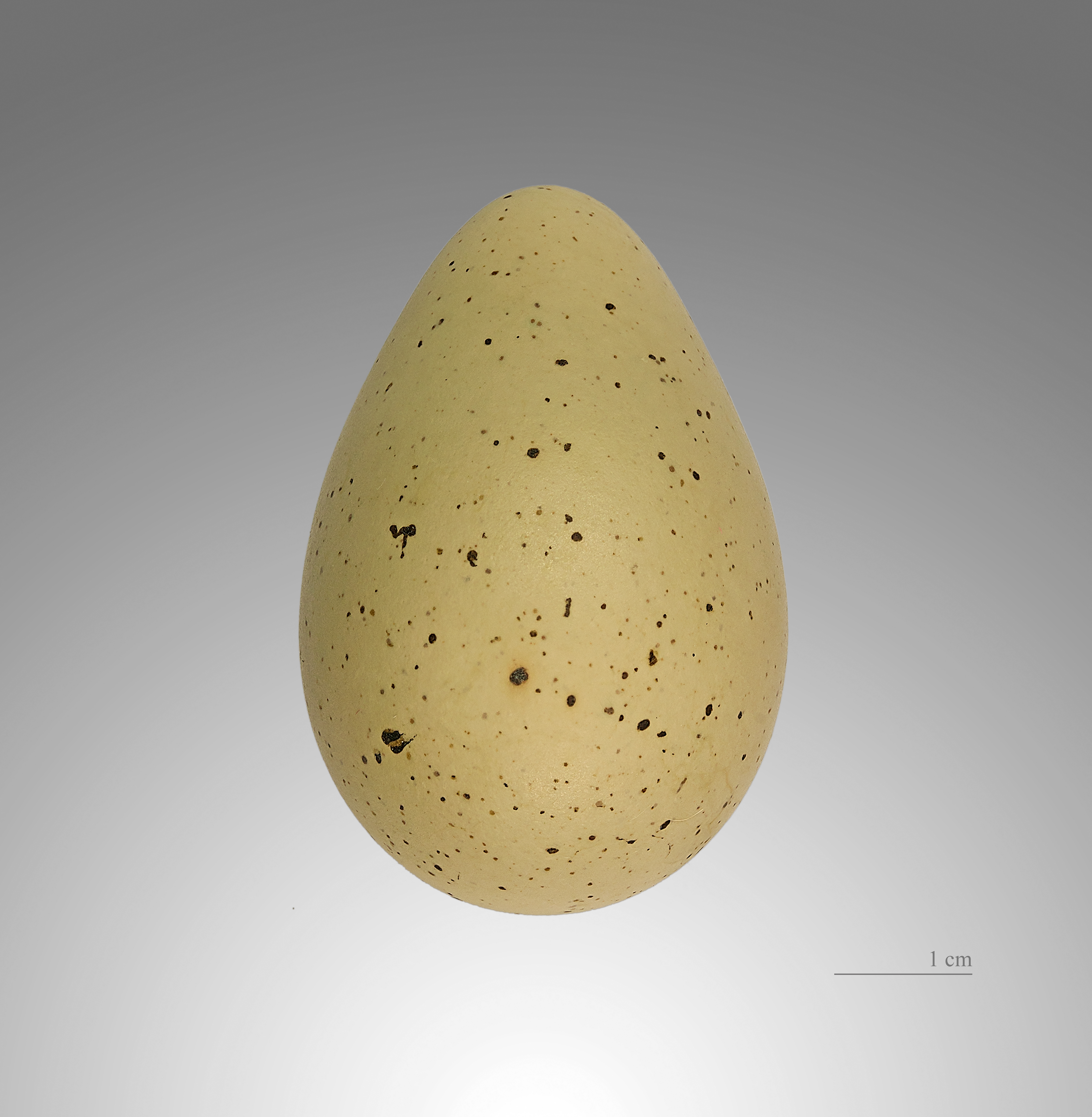
Egg from the Toulouse Museum collection.

The species is semi-colonial. It nests in dense colonies of 10–70 pairs, sometimes up to 200 in multiple groups, or as isolated pairs. In Algeria, islets with 798 nests have been recorded. It is monogamous, with pairs forming soon after arriving at breeding sites. It often nests in mixed colonies with gulls and waders, especially terns.

Pairs perform rituals to bond, such as tossing debris, pretending to drink, or bowing side by side. Mating involves the male preening after dipping its bill in water, while the female leans forward. The male moves around the female, repeatedly dipping its bill. During copulation, the female sways her neck laterally. Post-copulation, the pair crosses bills, and the male drapes his wing over the female before separating.

Some males have been observed attempting to mate with inanimate objects.

The nest is a shallow scrape, averaging 12 to 12.55 cm (4.72 to 4.94 in) in diameter, ranging from 6 to 22 cm (2.4 to 8.7 in), and 3 to 4 centimetres (1.2 to 1.6 in) deep. It is placed near water, up to 15 cm (5.9 in) above the shore, preferably on islets or dikes, in sand, short vegetation, or debris, but never in mud. Islets improve hatching success by reducing predation. Unlike the Eurasian oystercatcher, the avocet does not adjust nest size for water level changes.

Nests often include shell fragments, particularly Cerastoderma glaucum, and vegetation like samphire, grasses, goosefoots, sea-lavender, bromes, widgeon grass, or saltmarsh bulrush.

In colonies, nests are typically spaced 20 cm (7.9 in) to 1 m (3.3 ft), though in an Iranian colony, the average was 2.74 m (9.0 ft).

Egg-laying occurs from early April to early July, peaking from mid-April to mid-May. Clutches range from 69 to 92 days, typically with three to five eggs, occasionally more due to intraspecific parasitism. Eggs measure 55 by 35 mm (2.2 by 1.4 in) and weigh about 31.7 g (1.12 oz). Incubation lasts 19–34 days, averaging 23 days. Both parents incubate, with a ritual involving debris-tossing and sliding under the incubating bird to take over. This ritual diminishes over time. The non-incubating parent may feed up to 4 km (2.5 mi) from the colony.

The species typically lays one clutch per year, with replacement clutches if eggs are lost, usually to predation. Hatching success varies by site and year, ranging from 54–78% in the Olonne Marsh and 8–59% in the Séné Marshes.

==== Chick rearing and productivity ====
Chicks are nidifugous, leaving the nest after the last egg hatches. They remain in the nest for at least five hours post-hatching. In the first hours, they alternate between sheltering under parents and exploring nearby. Within 72 hours, the family moves to nearby feeding areas.

Both parents protect chicks from predators and weather. The species is highly territorial during chick-rearing, defending feeding and rearing areas against other birds. Adults use distraction displays, such as feigning a broken wing or swooping at intruders. Chicks hide in samphire, flee across mudflats, or swim when threatened.

Each family has a stable rearing territory, proportional to chick number, ranging from 260 to 5,200 m^{2} (2,800 to 56,000 sq ft). Stability depends on food and space availability. Asynchronous hatching may optimise mudflat use.

Chicks feed in exposed mudflats or water up to 1.5 cm (0.59 in) deep. They may travel significant distances shortly after hatching.

Chicks fledge and become independent 35–42 days after hatching. Rarely, chicks are raised by other species, such as Eurasian Oystercatchers in Somme Bay in 1981, where a chick was fed for two months, adopting oystercatcher behaviour.

Reproductive success varies by year and site, with productivity of 0.49–0.52 fledglings per pair on the Atlantic and Channel coasts, 0.45–0.63 in Languedoc colonies, and 0.04–0.22 in Camargue.

Sexual maturity varies: 25% of French birds breed in their first year, 40% in their second, while North Sea birds mature between two and five years. Generally, maturity is reached at 2–3 years.

First-year mortality is 50–60%, dropping to 20–30% in subsequent years. The maximum recorded lifespan for a wild ringed bird is 36 years, with another observed nearly 25 years post-ringing, though the average is 12 years.

==== Reproductive failure factors ====
The main causes of reproductive failure are intraspecific conflicts and predation by other species.

Predators include corvids like the carrion crow (Corvus corone) and common magpie (Pica pica), gulls such as the European herring gull (Larus argentatus) in the Atlantic and yellow-legged gull (Larus michahellis) in the Mediterranean, and raptors, particularly the common kestrel (Falco tinnunculus), which targets chicks. The peregrine falcon (Falco peregrinus) preys on adults, while the western marsh harrier (Circus aeruginosus) and white stork (Ciconia ciconia) may take chicks. Mammalian predators include the red fox (Vulpes vulpes), possibly the wild boar (Sus scrofa), mustelids, the brown rat (Rattus norvegicus), and stray dogs. Increased gull populations can disrupt colonies.

Nests may be destroyed by flooding or trampled by livestock. Poor water quality or inappropriate salinity can limit food availability, as can excessive salinity.

Spatial competition with other gull and wader species, such as the black-headed gull (Chroicocephalus ridibundus), Mediterranean gull (Ichthyaetus melanocephalus), European herring gull, gull-billed tern (Gelochelidon nilotica), sandwich tern (Thalasseus sandvicensis), common tern (Sterna hirundo), and little tern (Sternula albifrons), can hinder breeding.

Chick dispersal for food increases mortality risk, and harsh weather affects chicks aged two to three weeks.

== Parasites ==
The species hosts parasites like Giardia and Eurycestus avoceti, first observed in the American avocet and later in Camargue individuals, with the crustacean Artemia salina as an intermediate host.

== Habitats ==
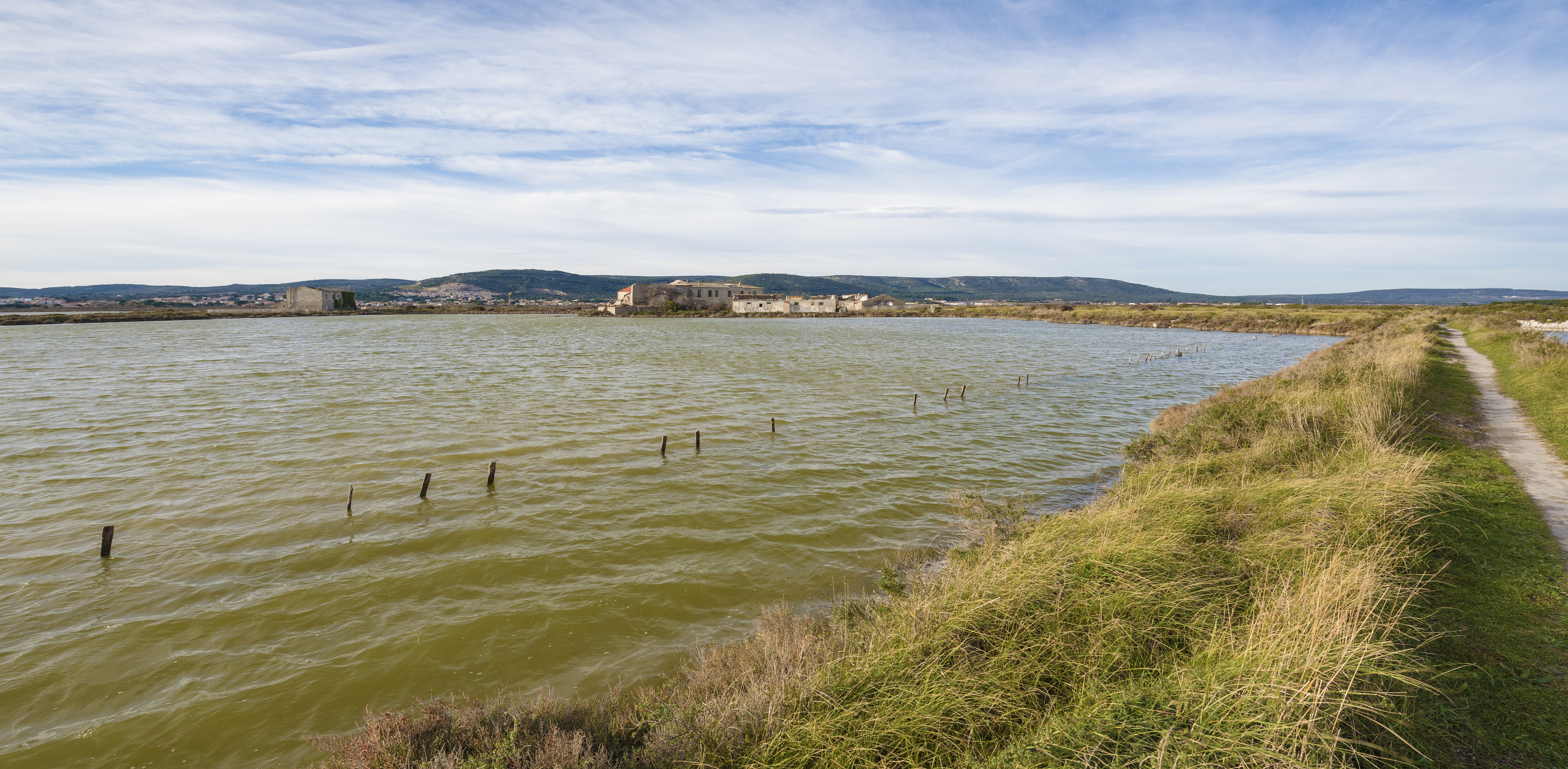
Typical Mediterranean habitat, here at the Frontignan Salt Flats in Hérault.

The species frequents coastal habitats. In winter, it gathers in groups on soft substrates like brackish or saline bays, sandbanks, estuaries, lagoons, deltas, or intertidal mudflats, used for resting and feeding. During high tides, it may stay in water or gather on salt marshes or cordgrass meadows. It also occurs in shallow lakes, ponds, salt marshes, or various floodplains, rarely on inland lakes or rivers, and sometimes feeds on agricultural land.

During breeding, Mediterranean populations use similar habitats. On the Atlantic coast, it inhabits wetlands, natural or artificial, with sparse vegetation and shallow water pockets with mud, sand, or clay islets, or dikes with samphire. Preferred islets are elongated, 3 to 15 m (10 to 49 ft) long and 3 to 4 m (10 to 13 ft) wide, offering a clear view of nearby water.

Locally, it may occupy port facilities, such as in Somme Bay, former polders, or sugar refinery settling basins in northern France. It has been observed breeding near hunting blinds. It breeds up to 1,000 m (3,300 ft) in altitude in Anatolia.

Key breeding habitat features include gradually decreasing water levels to expose feeding areas and high salinity to limit vegetation growth.

The EUNIS lists brackish and saline coastal lagoons and estuaries as key habitats.

== Distribution ==
The pied avocet is a Turano-Mediterranean species, found in the Palearctic. Its fragmented range spans European coastlines from southern Scandinavia and the Baltic states (e.g., Estonia since 1964) to the Iberian Peninsula, the Mediterranean, Black Sea, and eastern European plains (Ukraine, Bulgaria, Romania, Hungary). Major European populations are in the Netherlands, Germany, Denmark, Spain (southern and Ebro Delta), Italy (Po Delta and Sardinia), France, and Russia. It occurs on southern England coasts (about 150 pairs in 1979), having returned to breed in 1947 in Suffolk’s Minsmere RSPB reserve after disappearing in the mid-19th century.

In Asia, it ranges from Turkey (Anatolia) to northern Mongolia, northern China, southern Russian Far East, Kazakhstan, and Middle Eastern countries (Iran, Iraq, Jordan). It is patchily distributed in the Gulf states, Pakistan, and the Indian subcontinent.

In Africa, it occurs along the Mediterranean coast of North Africa, the Red Sea, and Atlantic coast to Senegal and northern Guinea, covering parts of the Sahel, East Africa, and southern Africa.

Northern European (Netherlands to Scandinavia) and eastern Asian populations are migratory. Western European birds winter in West Africa (Senegal, Gambia, Niger) and Mediterranean countries, especially Spain and Portugal (one-third of migratory European birds). Eastern European birds winter in Niger, Chad, Sudan, and the Red Sea. Some overwinter from Denmark to the Netherlands, England to Ireland. Asian populations winter in East Africa or the Indian subcontinent. Migratory groups of 5–30 birds move from August to October and return between March and May.

Mediterranean, some African, and Gulf populations are sedentary. Some Camargue birds winter in Morocco and Tunisia.

During migration, transalpine flights occur (e.g., in Engadine), but inland sightings are rare. Individuals have been recorded as far as the Faroe Islands, Azores, and Canary Islands.

=== In France ===
==== Historical presence ====
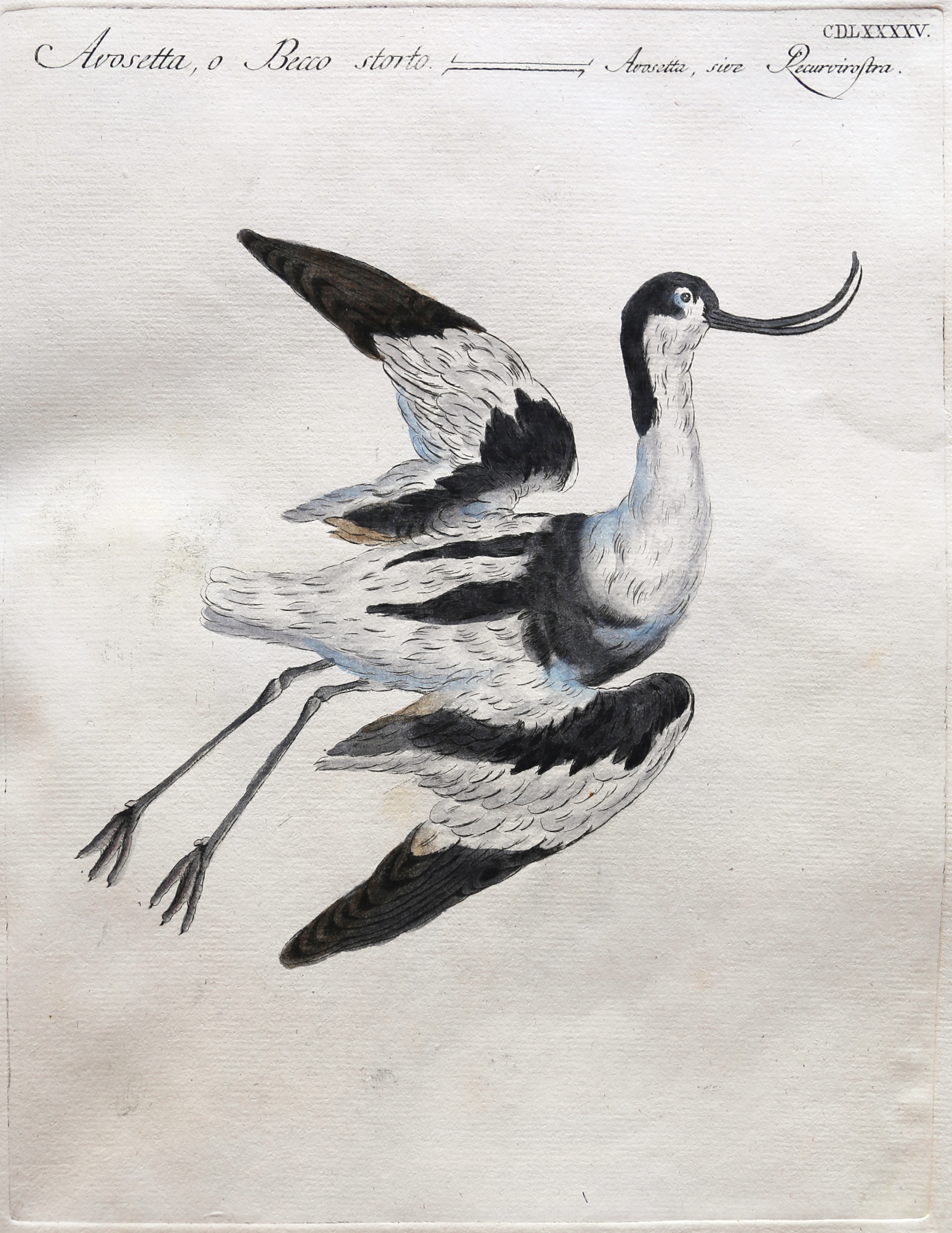
Illustration in Florence, Italy, by Saverio Manetti in the 1770s.

The Pied Avocet was present in France during the Roman Gaul period, evidenced by bones found in a waste pit in Lattes, Hérault, alongside other bird species. Later, a single specimen was found in 14th-century deposits in Abbeville, Somme.

It was noted as breeding in Camargue and Languedoc only from the early 20th century. It established breeding on the Atlantic coast from the 1950s, starting in Vendée in 1952, reaching Morbihan by 1983, and the English Channel and Somme Bay in the 1970s. It likely bred in France before the 20th century, possibly colonising or recolonising spontaneously from its Mediterranean range.

==== Current presence ====
The species is present year-round in France. In winter, northern migratory populations bolster local numbers, primarily along the Atlantic coast from the Gironde Estuary to Morbihan, hosting 80–90% of the national wintering population. It is less common along the English Channel, mainly in Somme Bay and Lower Normandy, and in the Mediterranean, primarily in Camargue and Montpellier ponds. Only about ten French sites exceed international significance thresholds (730 individuals for the Atlantic, 470 for the Mediterranean). It is occasionally seen inland in the northwest, particularly the Loire Valley, during late migrations in December.

During breeding, it occurs in three main regions. The first is along the English Channel coast, with colonies in Normandy (about 300 pairs), Somme Bay (about 170 pairs), Nord-Pas-de-Calais, and inland in Nord and Aisne.

The second region is the Atlantic coast, from Gulf of Morbihan to the Gironde Estuary. Vendée hosts the largest population with 1,300 pairs (30% of the national breeding population), followed by Loire-Atlantique with 500 pairs and Charente-Maritime with 400 pairs.

The third region is the Mediterranean coast, from La Palme salt flats in Aude to the Étang de Berre in Bouches-du-Rhône. An isolated population exists at Hyères Salt Flats in Var. Bouches-du-Rhône hosts 550 pairs, Aude 400 pairs. Provence-Alpes-Côte d'Azur accounted for about 20% of France’s breeding population from 2003–2012. The species is absent from Corsica.

=== In Belgium ===
The species is distributed in the Zwin Nature Park, Antwerp, and Ghent, with over 480 breeding pairs.

=== In Britain ===
The pied avocet was extirpated as a breeding species in Great Britain by 1840. Its successful recolonisation at Minsmere, Suffolk, in 1947 led to its adoption as the logo of the Royal Society for the Protection of Birds. The pied avocet has spread inland and northwards and westwards in Britain since then and it has bred in Wales and in Scotland in 2018 at Skinflats.

== Nomenclature and taxonomy ==
=== Etymology ===
The term "avocet" derives from the old Italian avosetta, attested in the 17th century, of unknown origin. In French, "avocette" stems from a 1760 error by Brisson, who replaced the "s" with a "c" in his bilingual Latin-French Ornithologie. This spelling was adopted by Buffon and standardised across languages.

The Latin name Recurvirostra avosetta derives from recurvus ("curved") and rostrum ("beak").

=== Taxonomy ===
The pied avocet was one of the many bird species originally described by Carl Linnaeus in his landmark 1758 10th edition of Systema Naturae, where it was given the binomial name of Recurvirostra avosetta. This species gets its English and scientific names from the Venetian word avosetta. It appeared first in Ulisse Aldrovandi's Ornithologia (1603). While the name may refer to black and white outfits once worn by European advocates or lawyers, the actual etymology is uncertain. Other common names include black-capped avocet, Eurasian avocet or just avocet.

It is one of four species of avocet that make up the genus Recurvirostra. The genus name is from Latin recurvus, "curved backwards" and rostrum, "bill". A 2004 study combining genetics and morphology had suggested that it was the most divergent species in the genus, but a more detailed 2022 study showed that it was closest to the other Old World species red-necked avocet of Australia, with these two earlier separated from the New World duo of American avocet and Andean avocet.

=== Phylogeny ===
The mitochondrial genome is 16,856 base pairs long.

=== Fossil record ===
The species is recorded from the Middle and Late Pleistocene in the Mediterranean region, specifically in Sicily. It is also reported in northeastern Bulgaria, along the Black Sea coast, at the Yaylata site, in a deposit dating to the mid-Holocene, alongside other bird species.

== Threats and conservation ==
=== Population size and demographic trends ===
The global population was estimated to be between 280,000 and 470,000 individuals in 2015. The overall population trend is unknown. In Europe, the species' population is estimated at between 117,000 and 149,000 adult individuals in 2015, equivalent to 58,400 to 74,300 breeding pairs, or, according to another source, between 38,000 and 57,000 pairs.

The Western European breeding population is estimated at 73,000 birds, wintering across Europe and Africa, from the Netherlands to northern Guinea, with 22,500 individuals in Sub-Saharan Africa. France accounts for 13% of the European breeding population. During the 20th century, the species experienced a significant population increase in Europe, coupled with substantial geographic expansion, which began to stabilise in the early 21st century.

In France, between 2002 and 2006, an average of 20,800 wintering birds were observed, with significant interannual variations due to weather, with harsher winters reducing numbers. Between 2010 and 2013, the French wintering population ranged between 17,000 and 25,000 individuals, representing nearly half of the European population. Since 1977, wintering numbers in France have been increasing; between 1980 and 2013, the wintering population grew by 49%, stabilising between 2011 and 2013.

Locally, there are marked differences between wintering sites. For example, along the English Channel coast, numbers have declined sharply by 80% since 1980, largely due to reduced habitat capacity and feeding areas at the Seine Bay, following the development of the Port of Le Havre. In contrast, along the Atlantic coast, numbers increased by 107% since 1980. The Mediterranean wintering population has also risen by 200% since 1980, though this is tempered by strong interannual variations.

During the breeding season, the species is relatively localised, with 3,650 to 4,350 breeding pairs recorded in 2010–2011, including 250 pairs along the English Channel and 1,500 to 2,500 pairs along the Atlantic coast in 2004. In the Mediterranean region, between 1991 and 1999, 810 to 928 pairs were recorded. Between 1996 and 2011, the Mediterranean breeding population increased by over 50%, reaching approximately 1,500 pairs.

Along the Atlantic and English Channel coasts, the breeding population has significantly increased since the establishment of new colonies in the 1970s; since 1996, numbers have doubled, accounting for 57% of France's total breeding population. In the Mediterranean, breeding numbers are generally stable, with notable variations by site (increases in Languedoc and a sharp decline in the Rhône Delta). However, between 1997 and 2007, the Mediterranean population was considered to be declining on its wintering grounds and migratory routes.

=== Conservation status ===
Due to its extensive global range (over 20,000 km^{2} (7,700 sq mi)) and large population size, the species is not considered threatened and has been classified as least concern (LC) by the IUCN since 2004. In Europe, its conservation status is deemed favourable. In France, it is also classified as least concern (LC) as both a breeding and wintering species. As a migratory species, it is classified as not applicable (NA) due to insufficient data.

The species is considered vulnerable (VU) as a breeding species on the regional red list of Provence-Alpes-Côte d'Azur, near threatened (NT) on the red list of breeding birds in Languedoc-Roussillon, vulnerable (VU) in Poitou-Charentes, and least concern (LC) in Pays de la Loire. In Brittany, it is vulnerable (VU) as a breeding species and near threatened (NT) as a migrant. In Normandy, it is critically endangered (CR) as a breeding species and endangered (EN) as a wintering species. In Nord-Pas-de-Calais, it is vulnerable (VU) as a breeding species. In Belgium, specifically Wallonia, it is considered vulnerable (VU).

=== Threats ===
Pollution (oil spill) from the Erika on French coasts during the winter of 1999–2000.

Various threats, mostly of anthropogenic origin, affect the Pied Avocet. The European population is relatively small and confined to a limited number of sites, particularly in winter. Many key wintering sites are located near oil port facilities, posing a significant petrochemical risk, as evidenced by a collision between two butane carrier ships in January 2006 in the Loire Estuary. The risk of oil spills, such as the ecological disaster caused by the Erika in 1999–2000, also led to a decline in French wintering populations.

Climate change has a notable impact on the species' reproductive success and affects its coastal habitat.

Habitat loss, particularly due to increasing coastal urbanisation, is a major issue. The degradation and destruction of coastal wetlands, essential for breeding, lead to more frequent disturbances, affecting reproduction, rest, and feeding by reducing available feeding areas for both chicks and wintering birds.

Intensified agricultural practices have caused significant drying of marshes, with, for example, 40,000 hectares (99,000 acres) of wet meadows destroyed in the Marais Poitevin. Poor water management, with excessive water level fluctuations, can be disastrous for colonies, as seen in the Somme Bay. Additionally, the abandonment of traditional practices in salt marshes and exploited plots alters the species' characteristic habitat and associated vegetation, negatively impacting colonies.

Specific urbanisation examples include port developments, such as in France's Seine Estuary and Loire Estuary, where mudflat areas have decreased by 25% in just 20 years. Excessive urbanisation in Portugal and the Yellow Sea also poses problems. The species may also be affected by reduced river flows in certain areas, such as in China.

Pollution is harmful to the Pied Avocet, with pollutants such as PCBs, insecticides, lead, mercury, and selenium found in eggs and bird tissues in Europe.

Locally, hunting and mosquito control can disturb the species and disrupt or destroy favourable biotopes. The species is susceptible to diseases such as avian botulism and avian influenza.

Finally, the species may occasionally be affected by egg theft for private collections.

=== Conservation measures ===
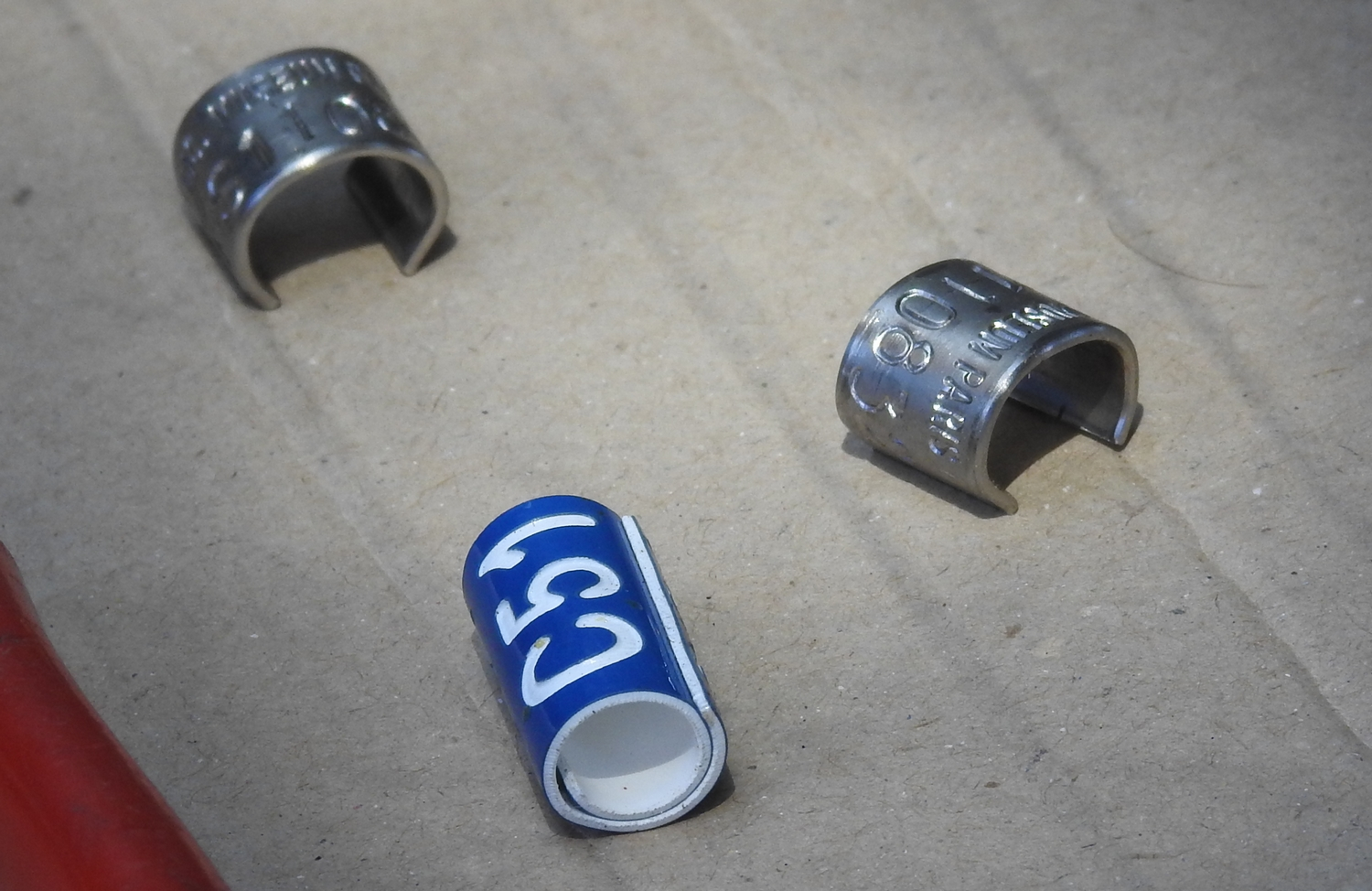
Metal and darvic rings used for ringing an avocet chick at Salins-d'Hyères (Var).

The species is protected in France under the Nature Protection Law of July 10, 1976, and its implementing decrees. The European Commission’s 1979 Birds Directive and the 1979 Bern Convention on European wildlife ensure full legal protection, prohibiting disturbance of birds and their nests. The species is listed in Annex I of the Birds Directive, Annex II of the Bern Convention, Annex II of the Bonn Convention, and Category B1 of the African-Eurasian Migratory Waterbird Agreement (AEWA).

The establishment of nature reserves, marine reserves, and special protection areas (SPAs) has benefited the Western European population during the 20th century.

Various management measures can promote settlement and reproduction. Constructing artificial nesting sites in coastal areas, such as pebble beaches or islands and rafts with sparse vegetation, can attract breeding pairs. Increased breeding pairs have also been noted with the introduction of livestock grazing in coastal meadows near breeding sites, reducing vegetation cover and improving visibility and predator detection.

Numerous colour-ringing programs, using metal and plastic colour rings, exist in Europe, enhancing ornithologists’ understanding of the species’ ecology and migratory movements, as well as improving monitoring of breeding behaviour and site management.

== In culture ==
With the help of a Motifs Advisory Group, the Governing Council of the European Central Bank selected the "avocet sweeping over the surface of a mud flat" as a potential front motif for the 2020s redesign of the 100€ banknote, with the reverse featuring the building of the European Council and Council of the European Union.

== Gallery ==
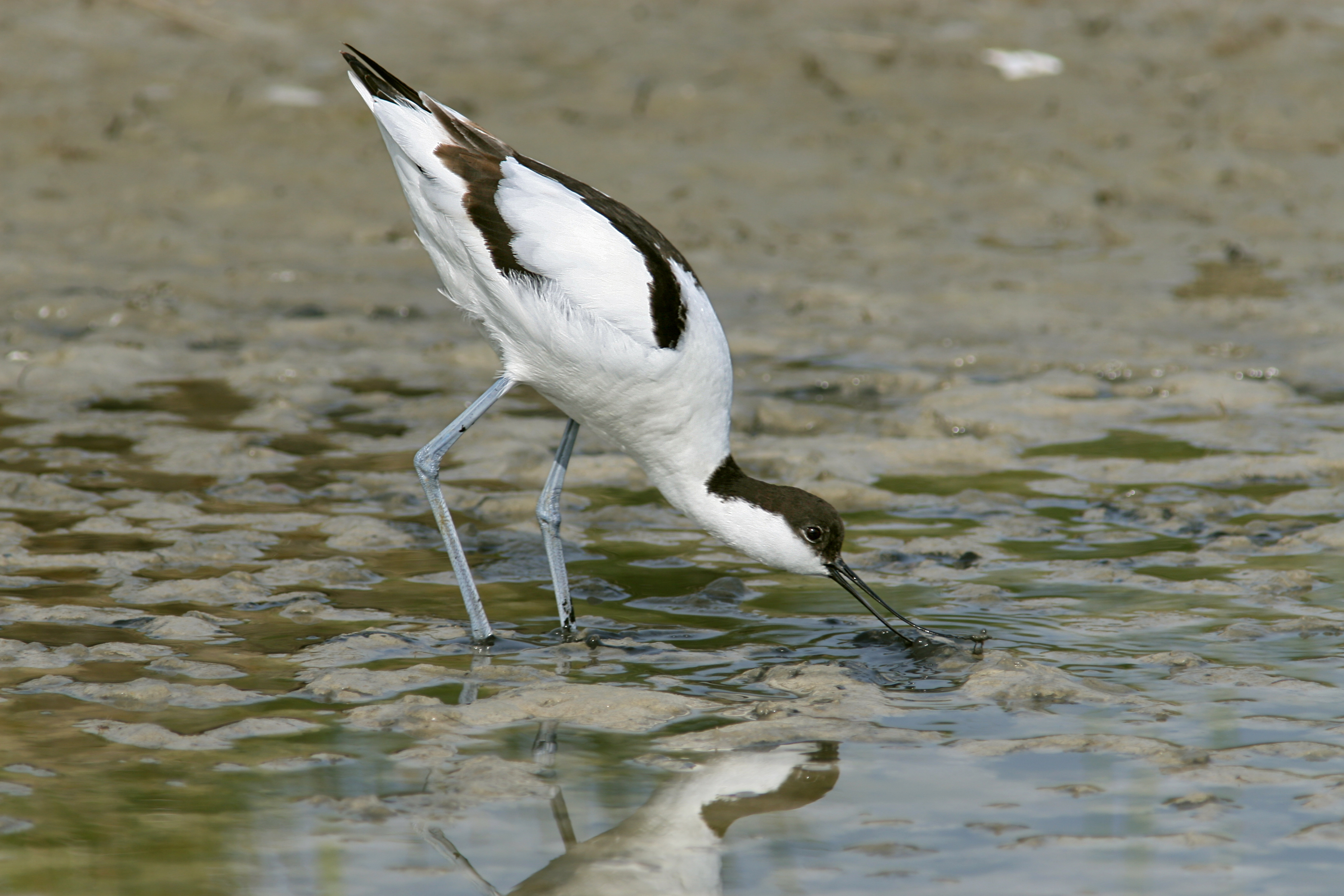
Adult feeding

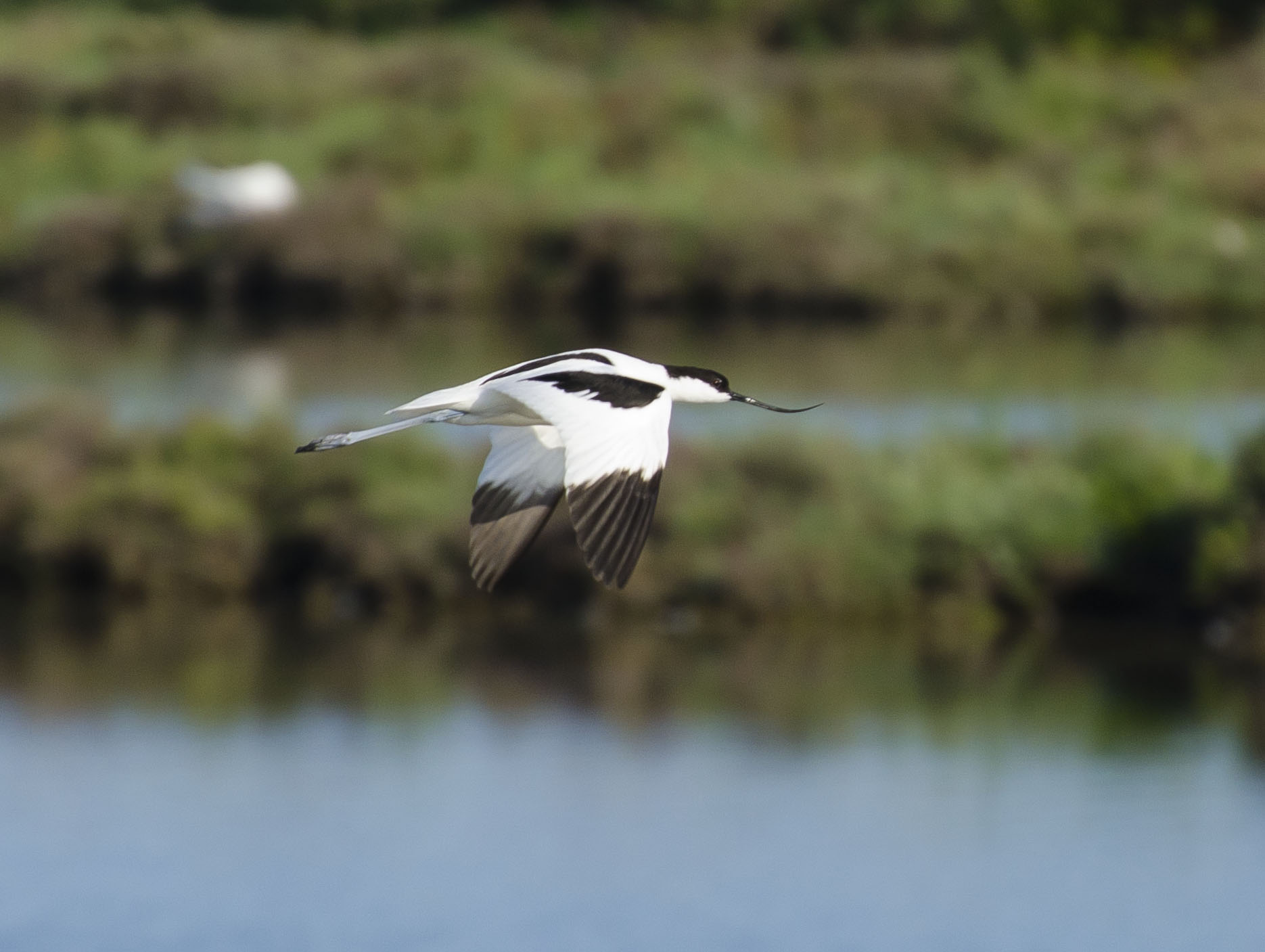
Adult in flight

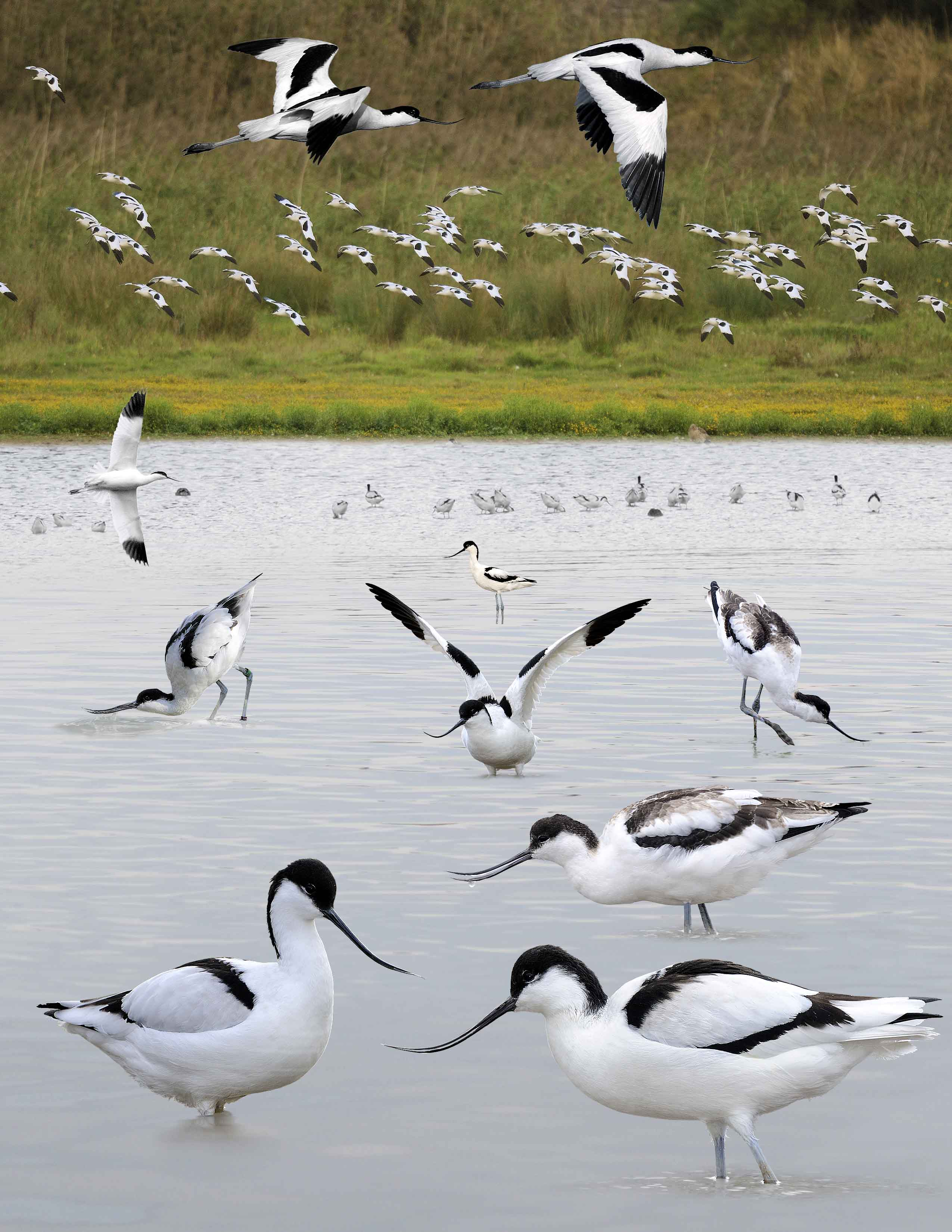
ID composite

Video showing bird seeking food

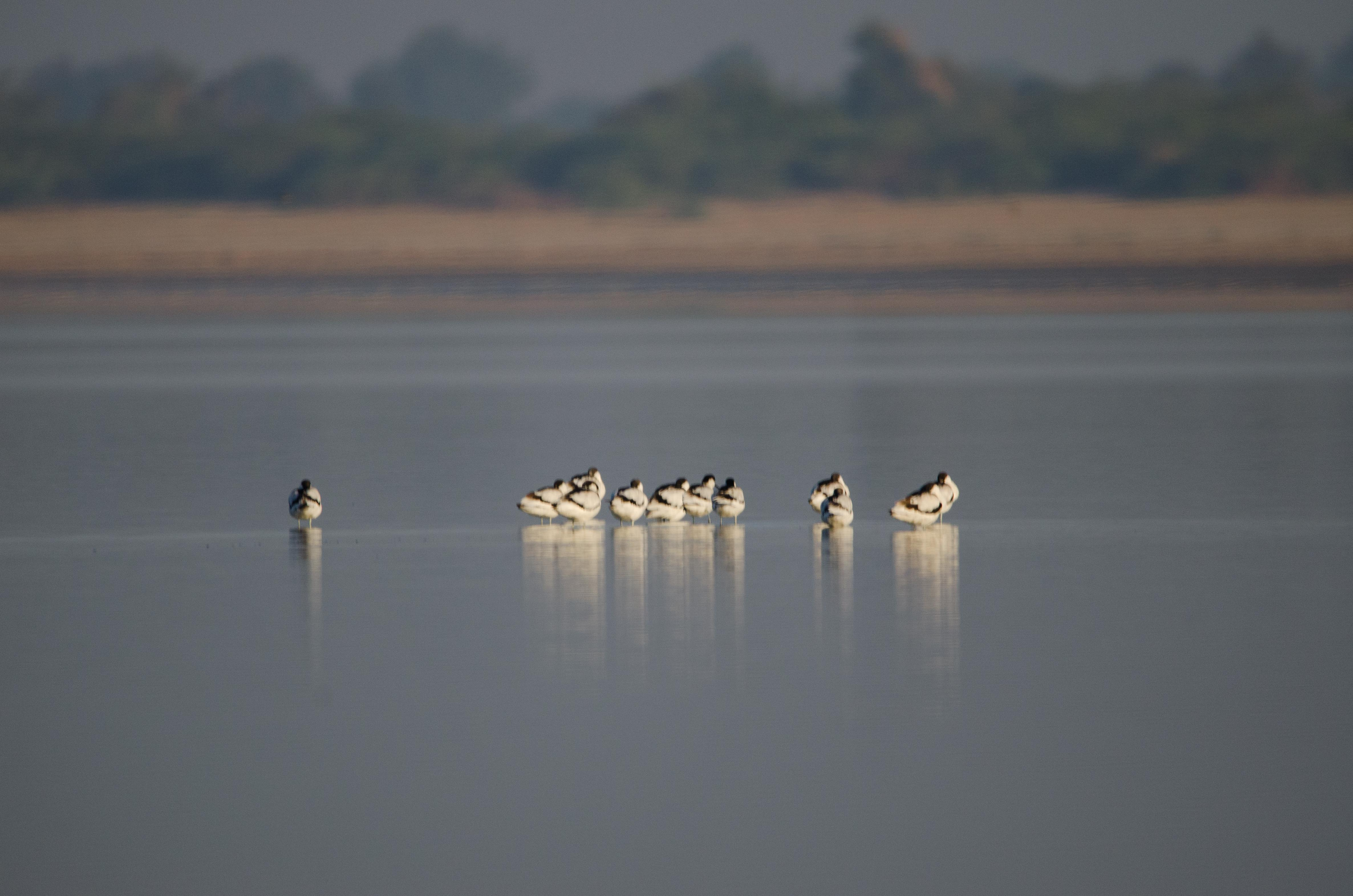
Pied avocets in Little Runn of Kutch, India

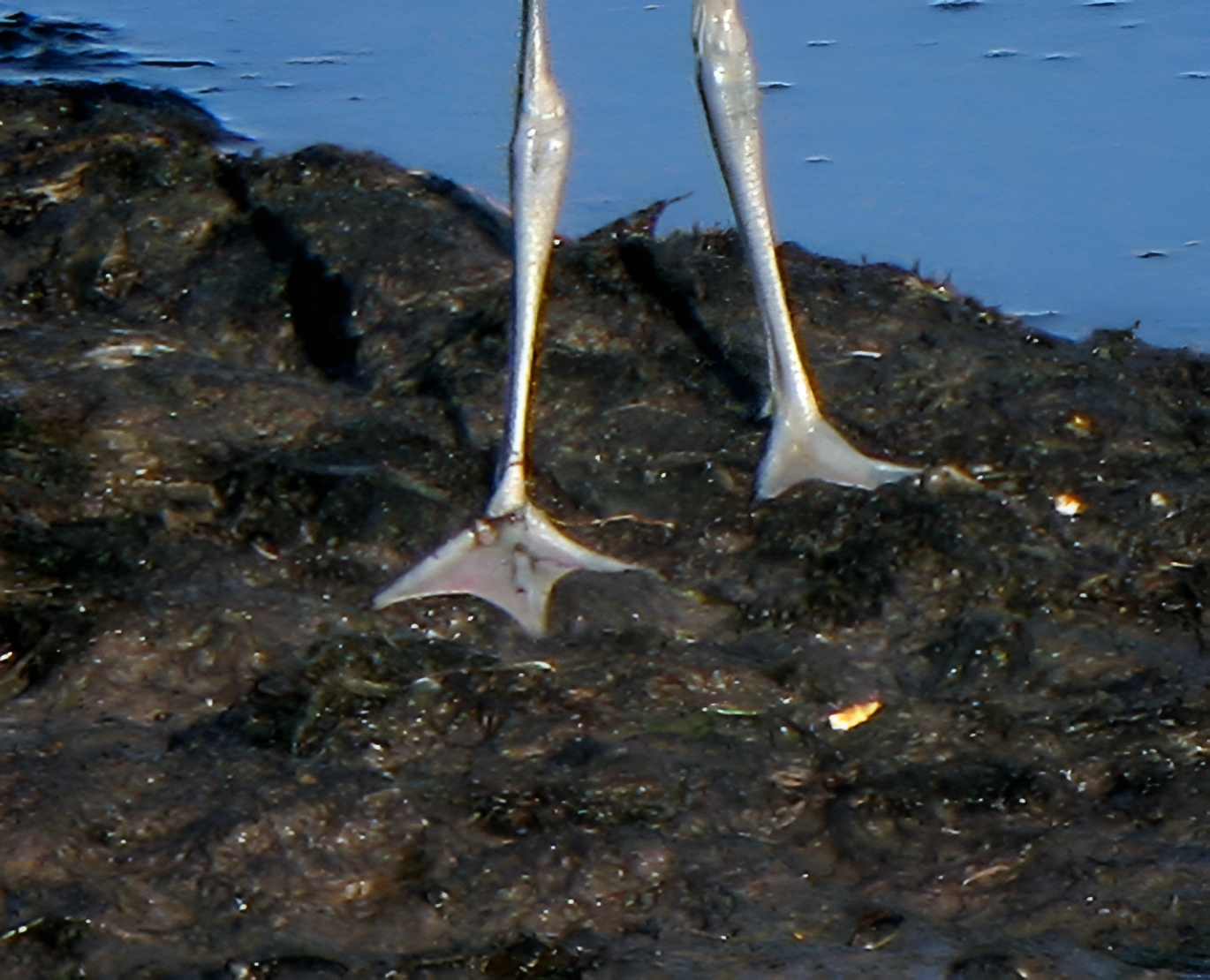
Unlike other waders, the pied avocet has webbed feet, and can swim well.
