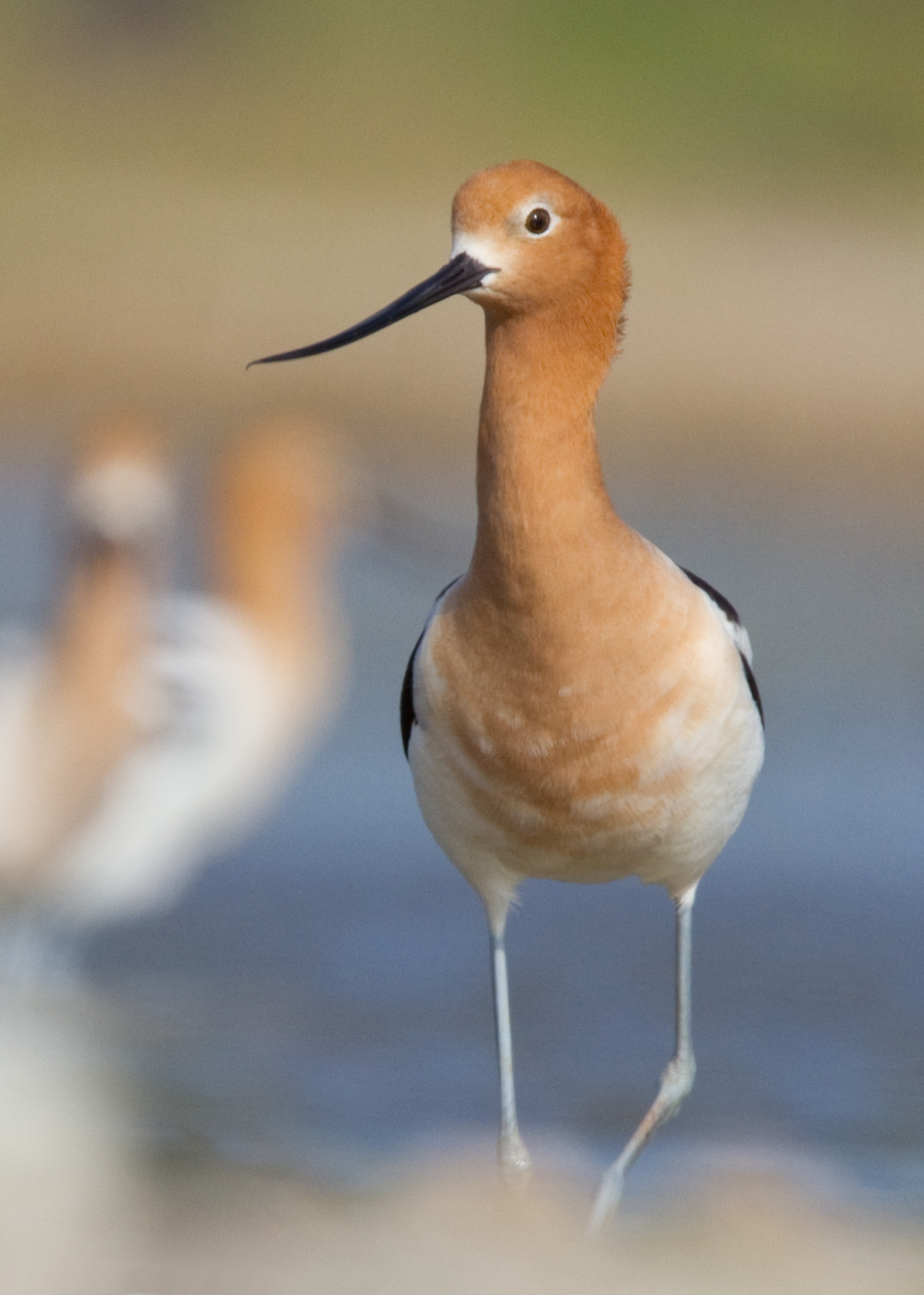
- Breeding plumage
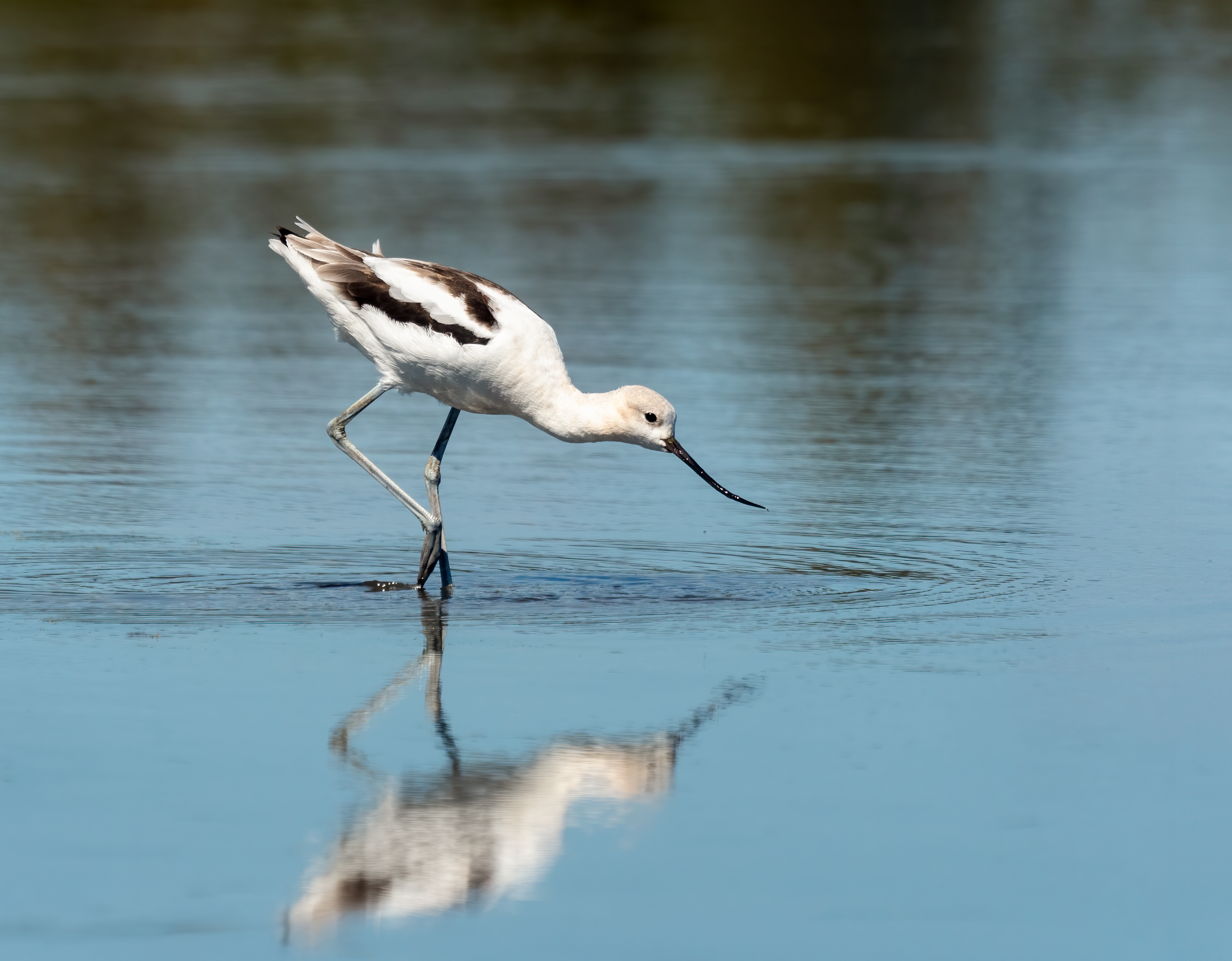
- Nonbreeding plumage

Conservation status
- Least Concern (IUCN 3.1)

Scientific classification
- Kingdom: Animalia
- Phylum: Chordata
- Class: Aves
- Order: Charadriiformes
- Family: Recurvirostridae
- Genus: Recurvirostra
- Species: R. americana

Binomial name
- Recurvirostra americana Gmelin, JF, 1789
- Breeding Migration Year-round Nonbreeding

= American avocet =

Species of bird

Calls recorded in Palo Alto, California

The American avocet (Recurvirostra americana) is a large wader in the avocet and stilt family, Recurvirostridae, found in North America. It spends much of its time foraging in shallow water or on mud flats, often sweeping its bill from side to side in water as it seeks crustacean and insect prey.

== Taxonomy ==
The American avocet was formally described in 1789 by the German naturalist Johann Friedrich Gmelin in his revised and expanded edition of Carl Linnaeus's Systema Naturae. He placed it with the pied avocet in the genus Recurvirostra and coined the binomial name Recurvirostra americana. Gmelin based his description on that by the English ornithologist John Latham who in 1785 had described and illustrated the American avocet in his A General Synopsis of Birds. Latham cited the earlier publication by William Dampier and also that by Thomas Pennant. The genus name combines the Latin recurvus meaning 'bent' or 'curved backwards' with rostrum meaning 'bill'. The species is monotypic: no subspecies are recognised.

The American avocet is a member of the order Charadriiformes, which includes shorebirds, gulls, and alcids. Its family, Recurvirostridae, includes stilts and avocets. The genus Recurvirostra includes three other species: the Andean avocet, the pied avocet, and the red-necked avocet.

== Description ==
The American avocet measures 40–51 cm (16–20 in) in length, has a wingspan of 68–76 cm (27–30 in) and weighs 275–420 g (9.7–14.8 oz) The bill is black, pointed, and curved slightly upwards towards the tip. It is long, surpassing twice the length of the avocet's small, rounded head. Like many waders, the avocet has long, slender legs and slightly webbed feet. The legs are a pastel grey-blue, giving it its colloquial name, blue shanks. The plumage is black and white on the back, with white on the underbelly. During the breeding season, the plumage is brassy orange on the head and neck, continuing somewhat down to the breast. After the breeding season, these bright feathers are swapped out for white and grey ones. The avocet preens its feathers, commonly considered to be a comfort movement.

The call has been described as both a shrill and melodic alarm bweet, which rises in inflection over time. Avocets use three distinct calls: common call, excited call, and broken wing call. The common call is a loud repeated wheep. The excited call has a similar wheep sound, but it speeds up rather than having an even rhythm. Lastly, the broken wing call is noticeably different from the other two calls. It is a distressed screech sound and is alarming rather than melodic.

== Distribution and habitat ==
American avocets were previously found across most of the United States until extirpated from the East Coast. The breeding habitat consists of marshes, beaches, prairie ponds, and shallow lakes in the mid-west, as far north as southern Canada. These breeding grounds are largely in areas just east of the rocky mountains including parts of Alberta, Saskatchewan, Montana, Idaho, Washington, Utah, North and South Dakota, Nebraska, Colorado, and even down to parts of New Mexico, Oklahoma and Texas. Their migration route lands them in almost every state in the western United States. The avocet's wintering grounds are mainly coastal. Along the Atlantic Ocean, they are found in North and South Carolina, Georgia and Florida. There are also wintering grounds along the Gulf of Mexico in Florida, Texas, and Mexico, and along the Pacific Ocean in California and Mexico. There are resident populations in the Mexican States of Zacatecas, San Luis Potosí, Guanajuato, Hidalgo, Mexico City and Puebla, and in Central California.

Flocks ranging from 50 to 300 avocets migrate together to their breeding sites together during peak season, which is typically in the spring, peaking around April or May.

== Behavior and ecology ==
=== Breeding ===
The American avocet breeds in anything from freshwater to hypersaline wetlands in the western and mid-west United States. After reaching their breeding grounds, the avocets quickly establish territory in pairs. Throughout the breeding season, these pairs engage in a series of copulatory displays, which are initiated by either sex and often involve preening. After breeding, the birds gather in large flocks, sometimes amounting to hundreds of birds. Nesting takes place near water, often alongside black-necked stilts, usually on small islands or mucky shorelines. The avocets nest on the ground in places with little to no surrounding vegetation. They make shallow indentations in the ground for their nest and line it with grass, feathers, pebbles or other small objects. Some avocets do not line their nests at all. During the breeding season, avocets lay around three to five eggs, with four being the most common number. American avocets are also known to have parasitized other birds' nests. One case study of the 1968 and 1969 breeding seasons suggests that this number allows for the highest rate of hatching success. They incubate them over a period of 23 to 25 days. Both parents are involved in the incubation process, taking turns during the day (except at night, where only the female incubates the eggs). Both parents take care of the newborn American avocets after they hatch. Male parents are more present in incubation during the first eight days, whereas female parents dominate incubation throughout the remaining 16 days. Time spent caring for newborn chicks equates to that spent incubating. The newborns are precocial, able to walk and capable of feeding themselves. The young are expected to begin flying four to five weeks after hatching.

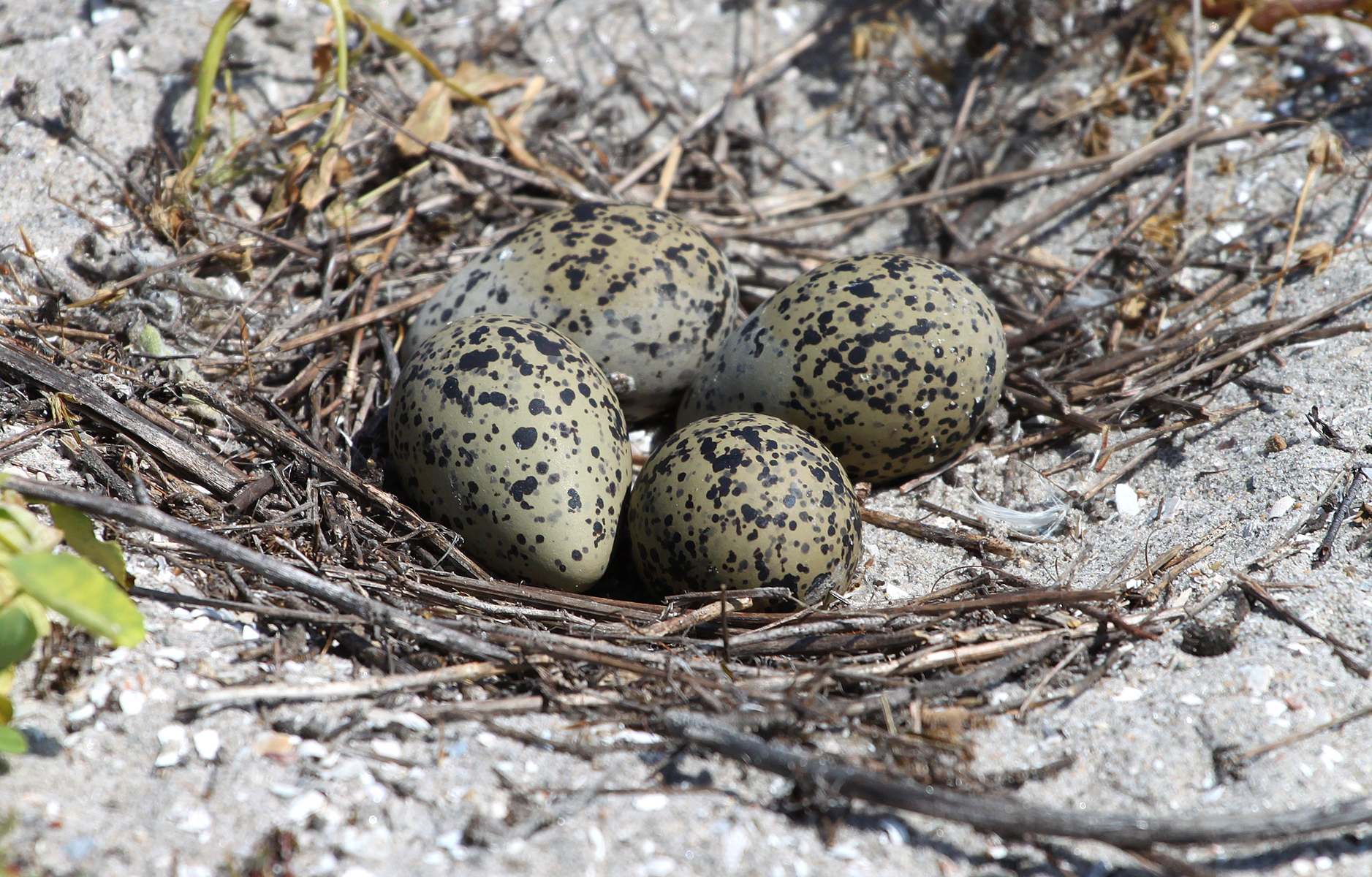
Nest with eggs

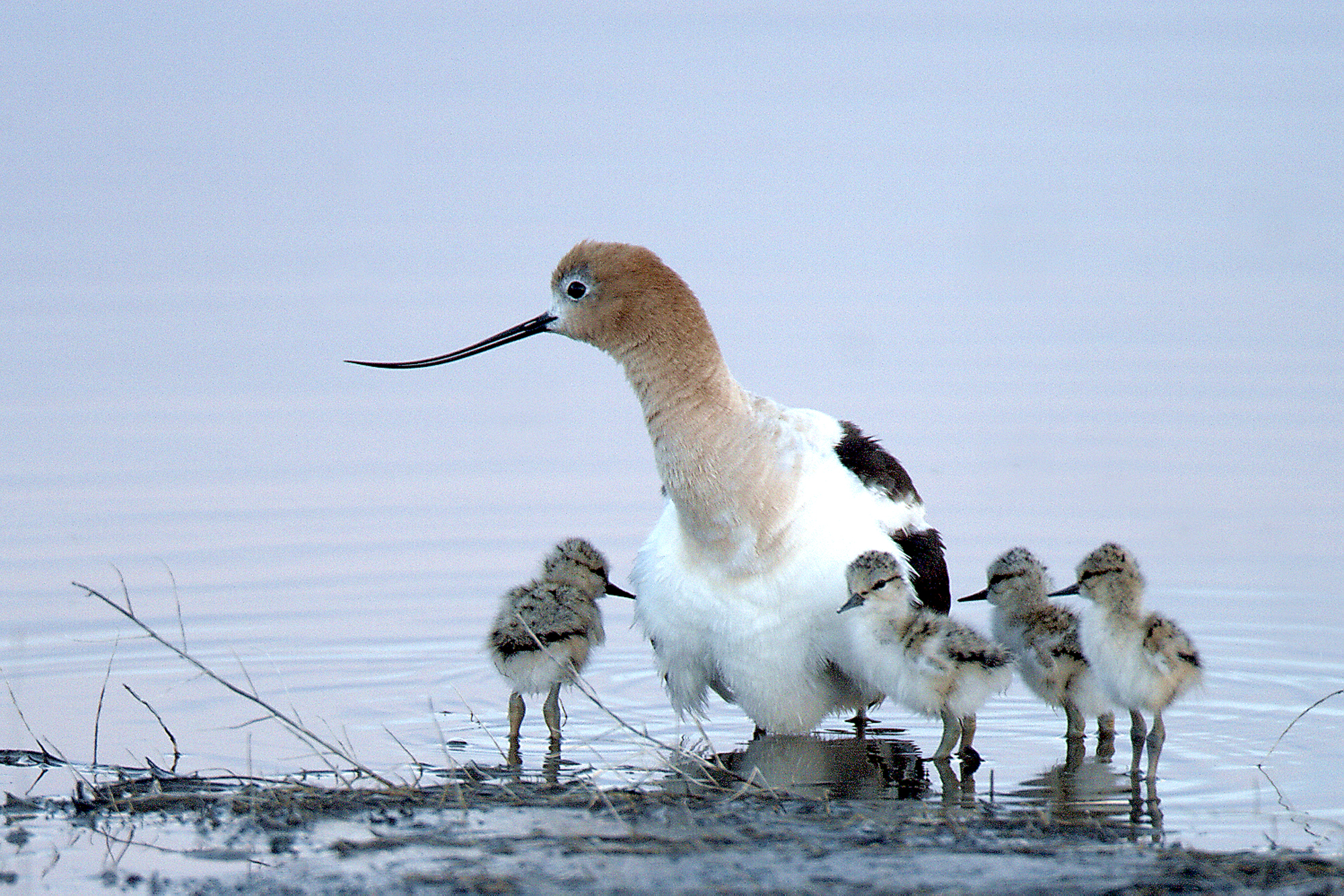
American avocet and chicks on Malheur Refuge

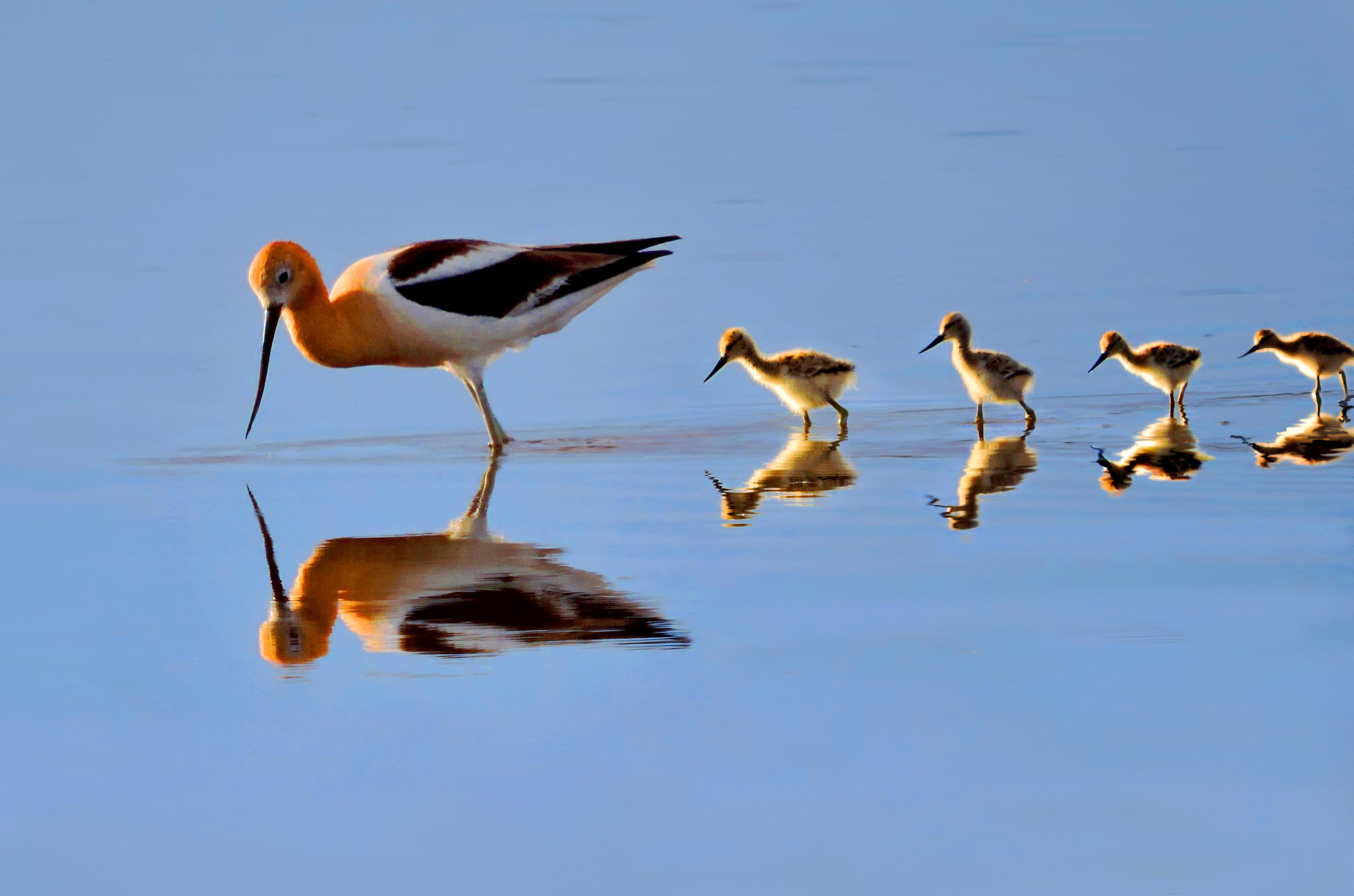
American avocet adult with chicks, Great Sand Dunes National Park

=== Anti-predator behavior ===
Each pair defends their own territory against predators and other avocets. Nests are built in areas that predators would struggle to gain access to. Predators that do try to approach the colony find themselves surrounded by several adult avocets. While incubating however, the avocets tend only to their nest and defense is considered a lower priority, unless the eggs are in immediate danger, in which case the avocets may take more aggressive measures, calling loudly and flying at the threat. Most efforts are solely distractionary; these include both aerial and terrestrial tactics in groups. Avocets may pretend to incubate where there is no nest, repeating at various spots in the vicinity. Uniquely, Avocets simulate the Doppler effect with their calls when diving at predators, imitating greater speeds to heighten intimidation.

=== Food and feeding ===
The American avocet tends to prefer habitats with fine sediments for foraging. In the winter, it feeds extensively on brine shrimp. Usually, this entails the avocet pecking while walking or wading on the shore, but it can also swim to expand foraging area. During the breeding season, avocets continue to eat brine shrimp but switch mainly to consuming brine flies. Brine flies and brine fly larvae are so abundant in avocet breeding grounds that they often blacken the surface of any exposed mud. Brine flies sustain the avocet during its breeding season. The avocet employs both visual and tactile methods of feeding. The primary visual feeding method is pecking at flies. However the avocet will also feed by plunging (wherein the head and neck of the bird are submerged), snatching (wherein the bird catches a flying insect), and bill pursuit (wherein the bird repeatedly opens and closes its bill while moving its head along the surface of the water). Methods of tactile feeding include filtering, scraping, and scythe feeding.

=== Lifespan ===
American avocets typically live between 9 and 15 years.

== Threats and conservation status ==
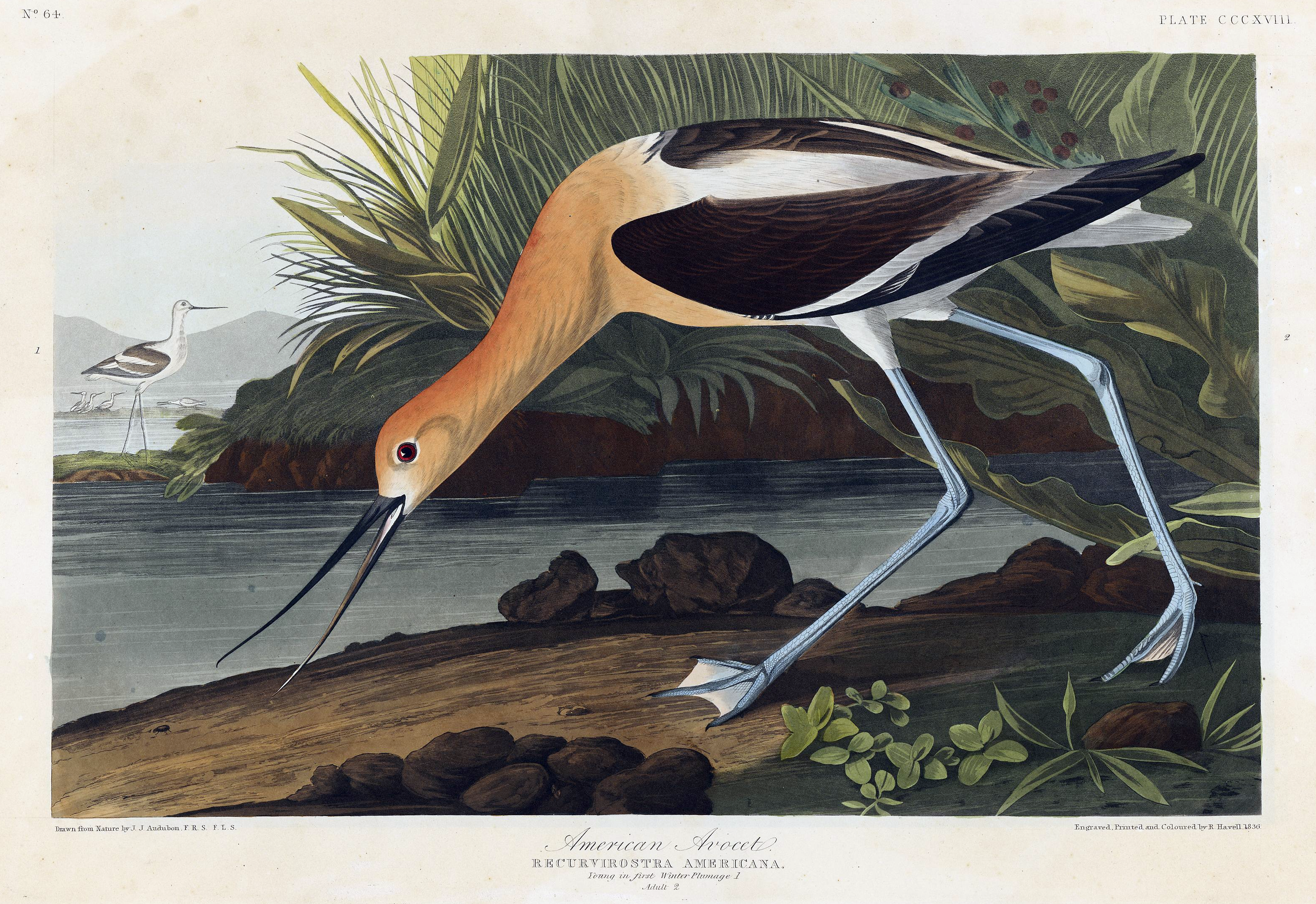
John James Audubon's depiction of the American avocet in breeding plumage

Shooting and trapping of American avocets led to population decline until the 1900s. During this time, the species was extirpated from most of the East Coast of the United States. By 1918, Avocets became protected under the Migratory Bird Treaty Act (16 U.S.C. 703–712). Since that time, other threats have emerged. Contaminants and toxins such as DDT, selenium, and methylmercury, have increased in American avocet habitats in recent years. Although the effects are highly contested, these increased concentrations have potential negative effects on American avocet breeding success, especially because Avocet chicks are more susceptible to environmental disruptions than adults. The avocet also faces habitat loss. While agricultural and industrial environments have become alternate habitat for the avocet, natural wetlands are decreasing rapidly. Additionally, increases in the salinity levels of wetlands have had adverse effects on the breeding and development of avocets. Young avocets in saline or hypersaline environments often combat weight loss and dehydration. Although American avocets face numerous environmental challenges, numbers have stayed steady, and according to the National Audubon Society, numbers have been increasing steadily in the eastern United States for the past few years. The American avocet is protected under the Migratory Bird Treaty Act of 1918.

== In culture ==
In his famous The Birds of America, John James Audubon describes a day of stalking and spying on the avocet. He judiciously noted their foraging, nesting, defensive, and flight behaviors.

== Gallery ==
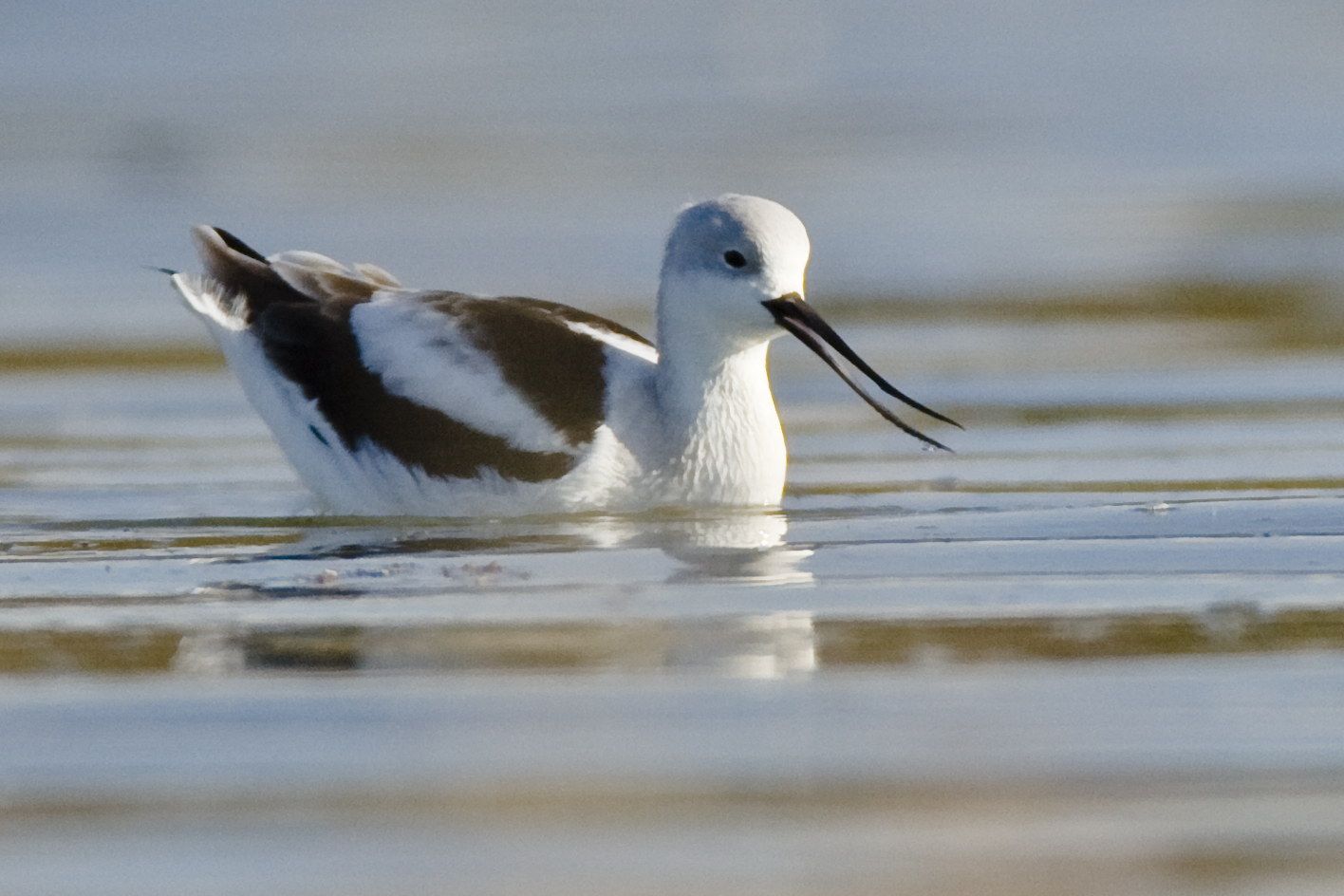
Winter plumage

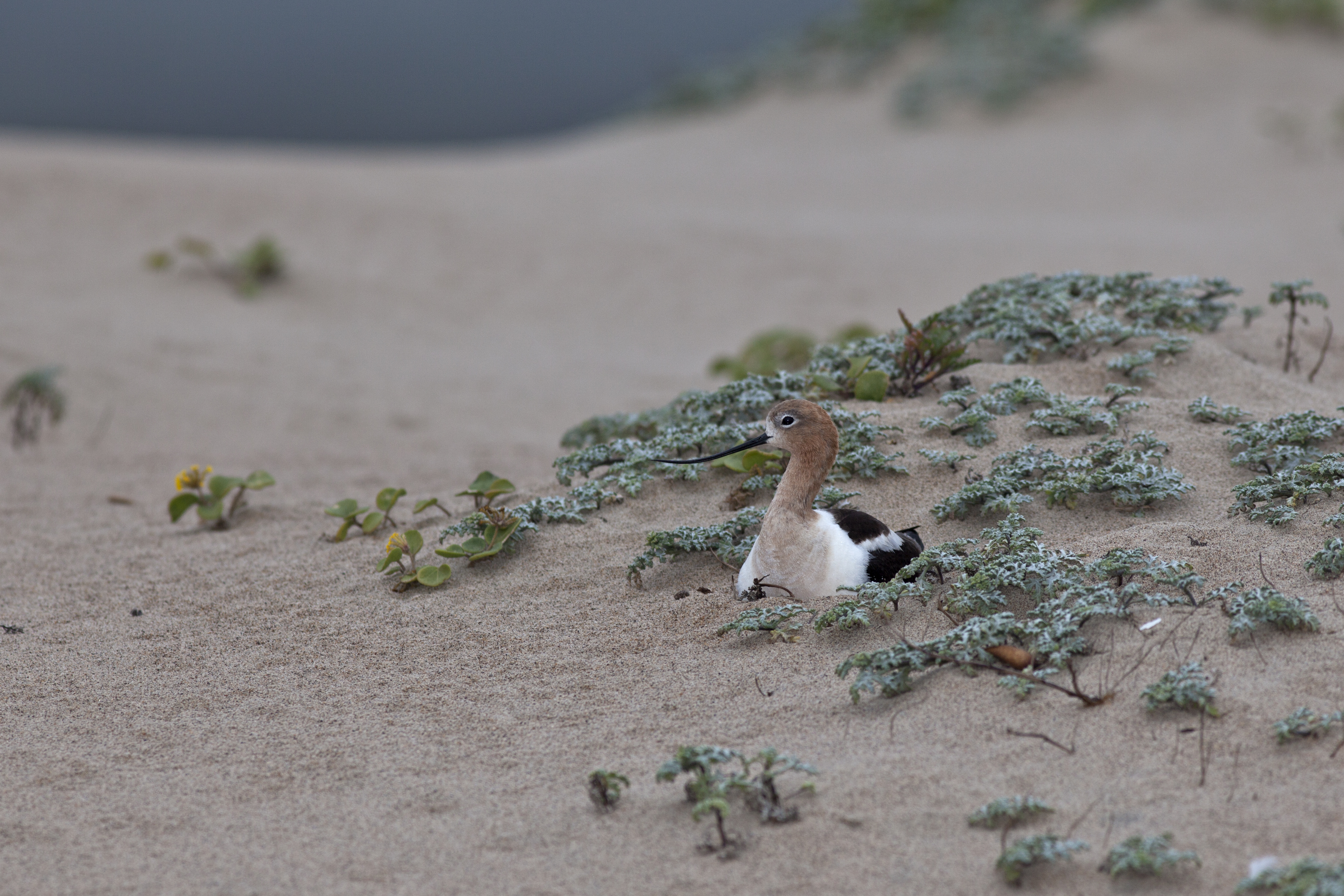
Nesting

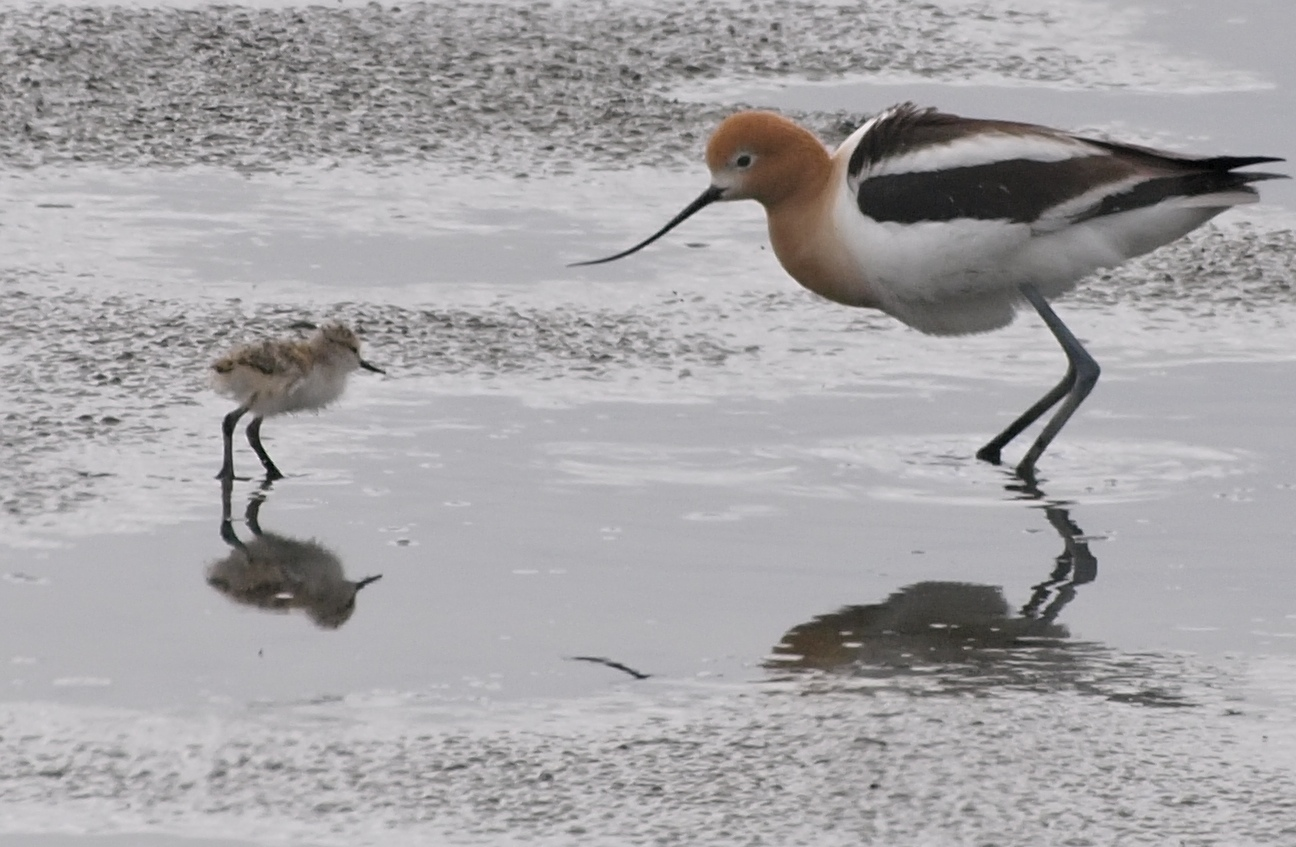
Adult with a chick at Palo Alto Baylands Nature Preserve, California

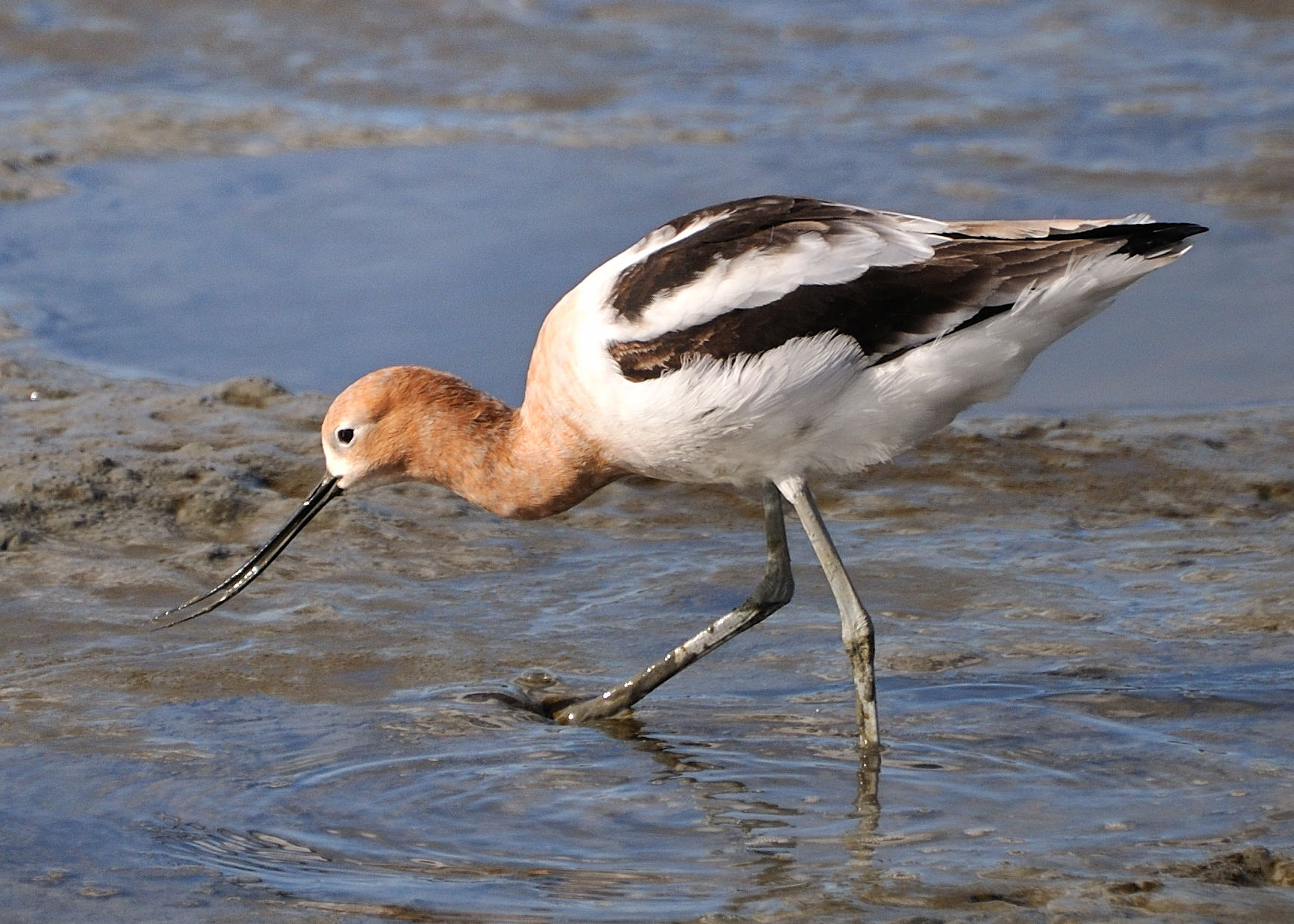
Breeding plumage

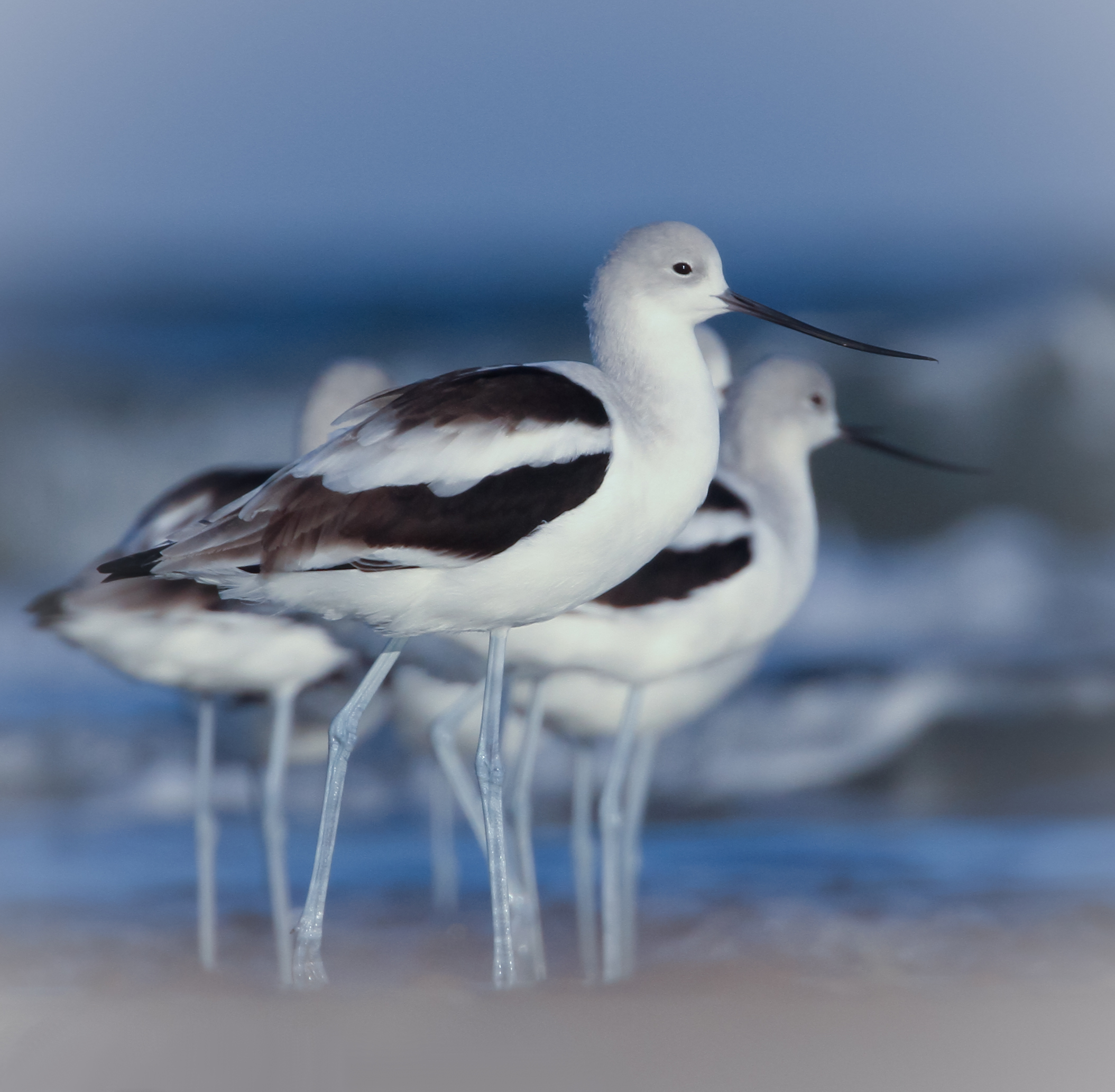
Quintana, Texas, in winter

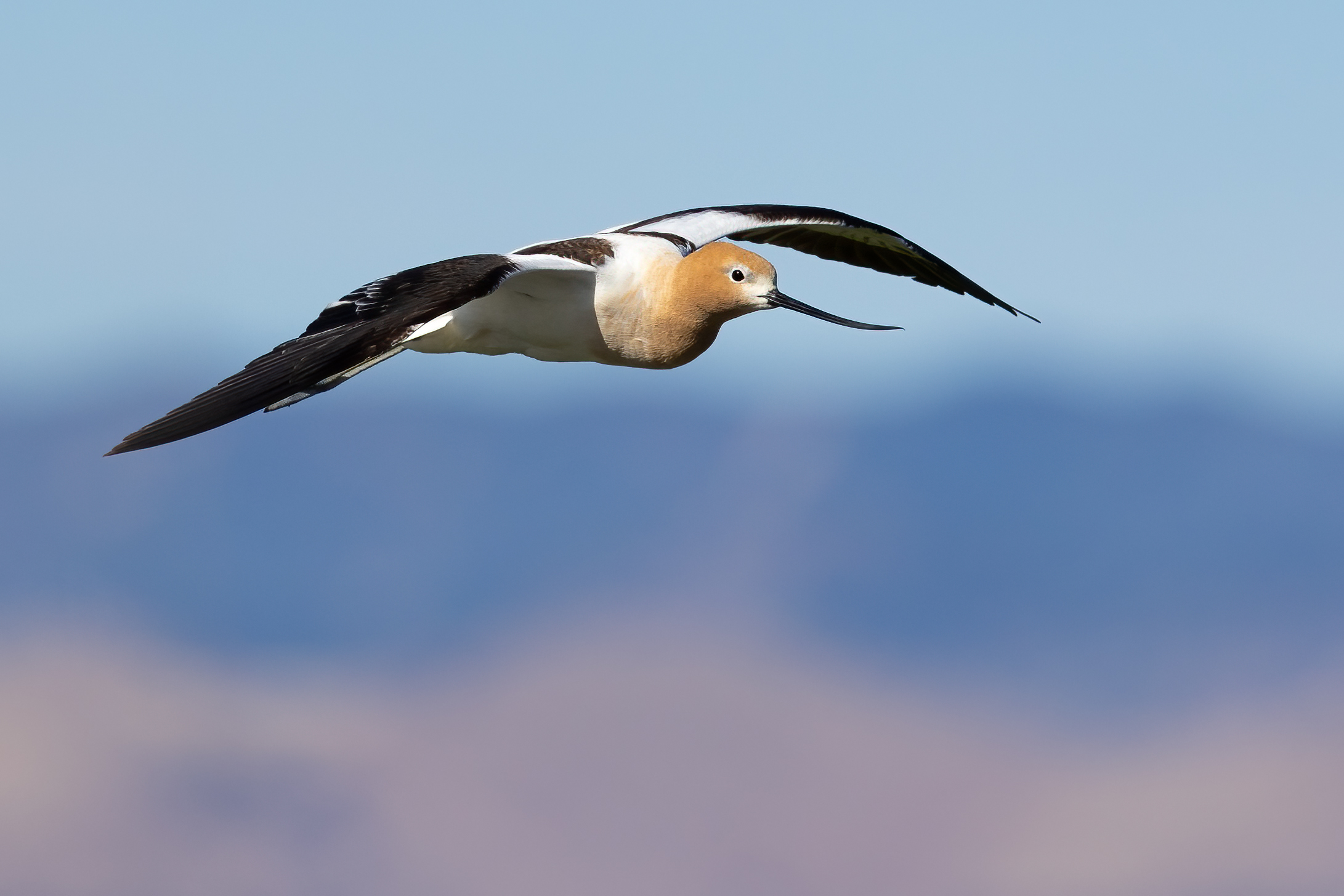
In flight at the Sacramento National Wildlife Refuge, California

In the Yolo Bypass Wildlife Area, California
