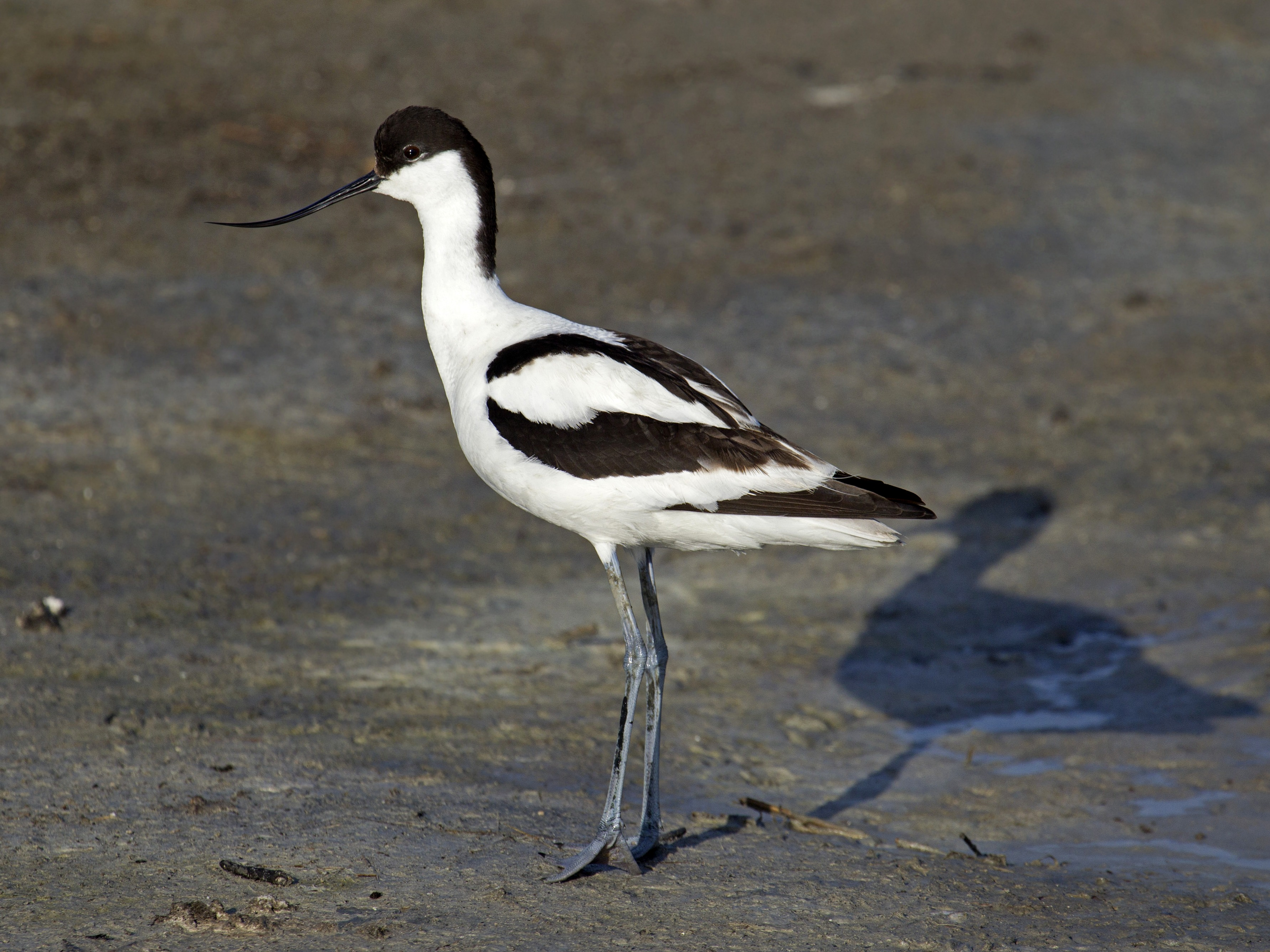
- Pied avocet (Recurvirostra avosetta)

Scientific classification
- Kingdom: Animalia
- Phylum: Chordata
- Class: Aves
- Order: Charadriiformes
- Family: Recurvirostridae
- Genus: Recurvirostra; Linnaeus, 1758

Type species
- Recurvirostra avosetta Linnaeus, 1758

Species
- Recurvirostra avosetta; Recurvirostra americana; Recurvirostra novaehollandiae; Recurvirostra andina

= Avocet =

Avocets

Genus of birds

The four species of avocets /ˈævəsɛt/ are a genus, Recurvirostra, of waders in the same avian family as the stilts. The genus name comes from Latin recurvus, 'curved backwards' and rostrum, 'bill'. The common name is thought to derive from the Italian (Ferrarese) word avosetta, which may relate to Latin avis ("bird"). Francis Willughby in 1678 noted the "Avosetta of the Italians".

== Taxonomy ==
The genus Recurvirostra was introduced in 1758 by Swedish naturalist Carl Linnaeus in the 10th edition of his Systema Naturae to contain a single species, the pied avocet, Recurvirostra avosetta. The genus name combines the Latin recurvus meaning 'bent' or 'curved backwards' with rostrum meaning 'bill'.

=== Species ===
The genus contains four species.

Image	Species	Common name	Distribution
	Recurvirostra americana	American avocet	Central/Western United States, South Florida, Mexico, Saskatchewan, and Alberta
	Recurvirostra andina	Andean avocet	Argentina, western Bolivia, northern Chile, and southern Peru
	Recurvirostra avosetta	Pied avocet	Africa, temperate Europe and Western and Central Asia
	Recurvirostra novaehollandiae	Red-necked avocet	Australia

=== Fossil record ===
One fossil species, R. sanctaneboulae Mourer-Chauviré, 1978, dates from the late Eocene of France.

== Biology ==
Avocets have long legs and long, thin, upcurved bills which they sweep from side to side when feeding in the brackish or saline wetlands they prefer. Their plumage is pied, sometimes also with some red.

Members of this genus have webbed feet and readily swim. Their diet consists of aquatic insects and other small creatures.

Avocets nest on the ground in loose colonies. In estuarine settings, they may feed on exposed bay muds or mudflats. The nest is simply a lining of grass in a hollow in the ground. They lay three or four eggs of a dark greenish or brownish buff color, boldly marked with brown and black.

The pied avocet is the emblem of the Royal Society for the Protection of Birds.

== Range and habitat ==
In a large colony, they are aggressively defensive and chase off any other species of birds that try to nest among or near them. That causes the annoyed remark "Avocet: Exocet" from some British birdwatchers.

They had been extirpated in Britain for a long time because of land reclamation of their habitat and persecution by skin and egg collectors, but during or soon after World War II, they started breeding on reclaimed land near the Wash, which was returned to salt marsh to make difficulties for any landing German invaders. Avocets use Titchfield Haven National Nature Reserve as a summer breeding ground.
