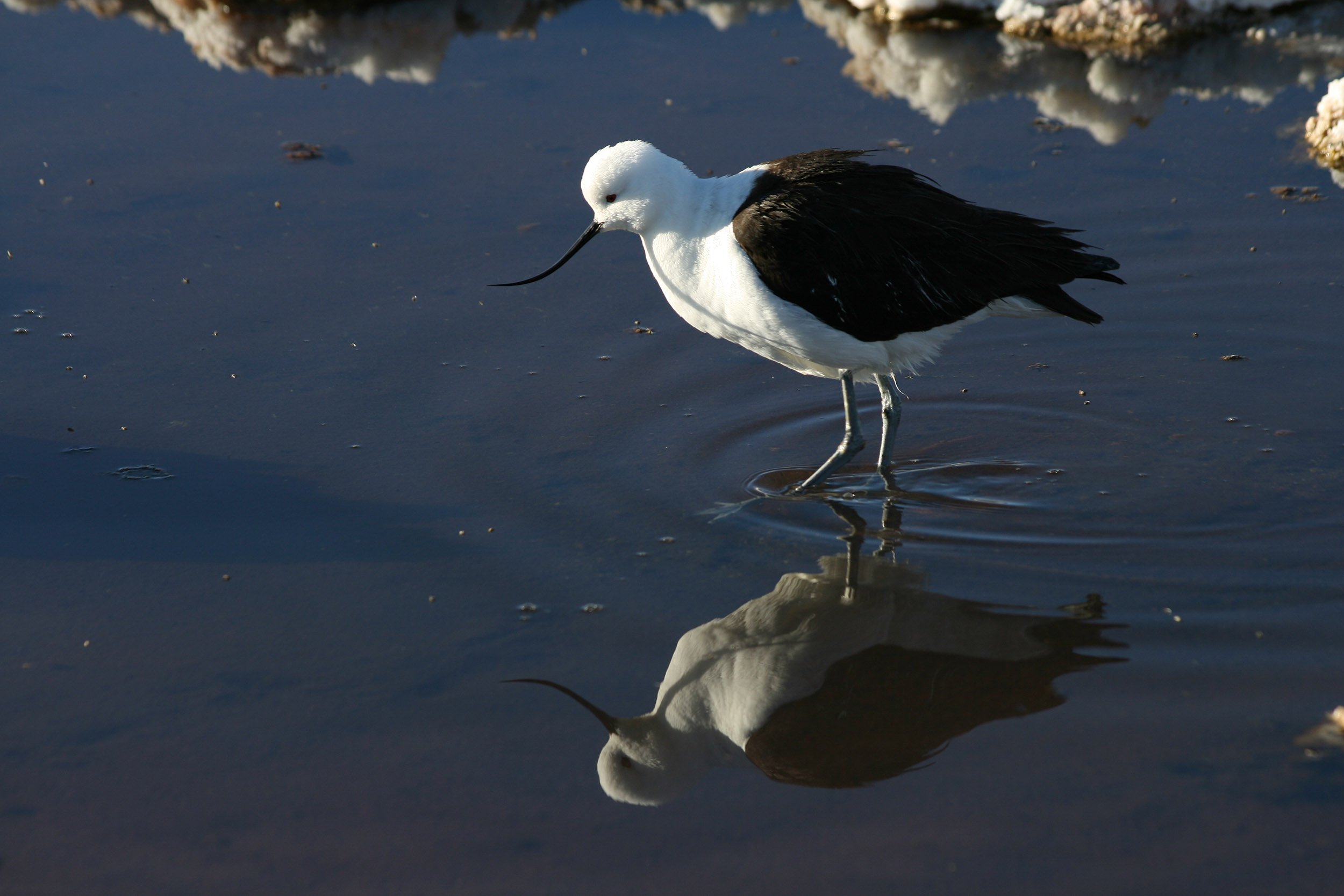

Conservation status
- Least Concern (IUCN 3.1)

Scientific classification
- Kingdom: Animalia
- Phylum: Chordata
- Class: Aves
- Order: Charadriiformes
- Family: Recurvirostridae
- Genus: Recurvirostra
- Species: R. andina

Binomial name
- Recurvirostra andina Philippi & Landbeck, 1861

= Andean avocet =

Species of bird

The Andean avocet (Recurvirostra andina) is a large wader in the avocet and stilt bird family, Recurvirostridae. It is resident in the Andes, breeding above 3500 m in northwestern Argentina, western Bolivia, northern Chile and southern Peru.

== Description ==
This avocet has a white head, neck, underparts and rump, and dark brown back, wings and tail. It is similar in size but slightly bulkier than the American avocet, at 43–48 cm (17–19 in) in length and 315–410 g (11.1–14.5 oz) in weight. Average body mass is 361 g (12.7 oz), making it likely the heaviest of the Recurvirostridae family. The thin, grey legs are not as long as with other avocet species, but the long thin black bill is upturned at the end. The sexes are similar, and the juvenile plumage is undescribed.

The colour pattern is similar to that of the local subspecies Himantopus himantopus melanurus of black-winged stilt, but that bird has very long red legs a white tail and a straight bill.

== Behaviour ==
The Andean avocet nests near shallow, preferably alkaline lakes in the Andes, often in small groups. The eggs are laid in at least January.

This species is non-migratory, but may move to slightly lower altitudes when not breeding.

The Andean avocet forages in shallow water or on mud flats, often sweeping its bill from side to side in water as it seeks its crustacean and insect prey.
