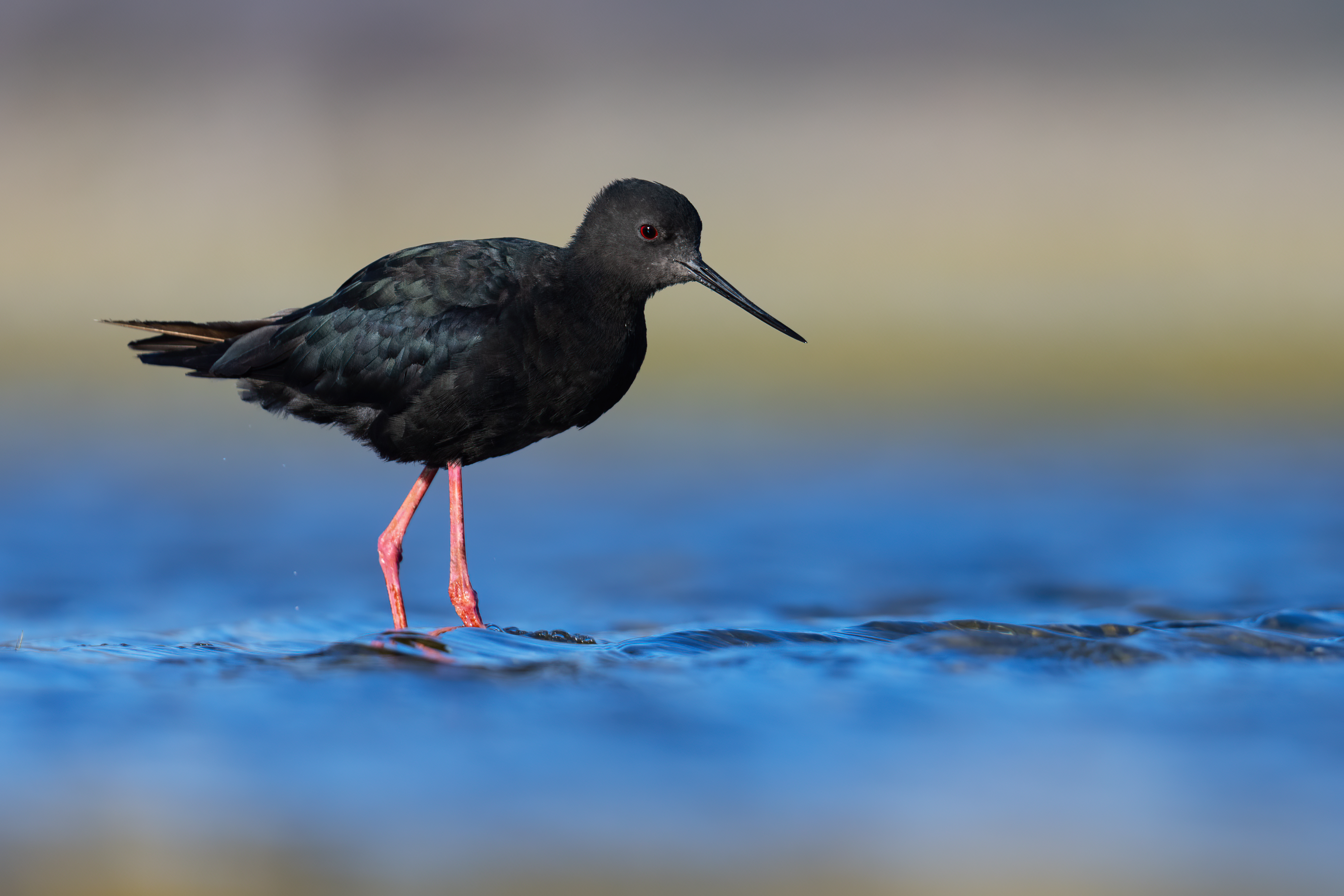
- Wild kakī in Lake Tekapo

Conservation status
- Critically Endangered (IUCN 3.1)

Scientific classification
- Kingdom: Animalia
- Phylum: Chordata
- Class: Aves
- Order: Charadriiformes
- Family: Recurvirostridae
- Genus: Himantopus
- Species: H. novaezelandiae

Binomial name
- Himantopus novaezelandiae Gould, 1841
- Distribution map: Extant Approximate probable original distribution of the black stilt

= Black stilt =

Species of bird

The black stilt or kakī (Māori), (Himantopus novaezelandiae) is a wading bird found in New Zealand. It is one of the world's rarest birds, with 169 adults surviving in the wild as of May 2020. Adult kakī have distinctive black plumage, long pink legs, and a long thin black bill. Black stilts largely breed in the Mackenzie Basin in the South Island, and are threatened by introduced feral cats, ferrets, and hedgehogs as well as habitat degradation from hydroelectric dams, agriculture, and invasive weeds.

== Taxonomy and systematics ==
Black stilts are one of several species in the genus Himantopus, classified along with avocets in the family Recurvirostridae. Although genetically and behaviourally distinct from pied stilts (Himantopus himantopus), they are able to successfully hybridise with them. Hybridisation and dilution of the gene pool is one reason black stilts are threatened with extinction. Black and pied stilts in New Zealand represent two colonisations of pied stilt ancestors from Australia: the first, long ago, giving rise to melanistic descendants, the second in the early 19th century.

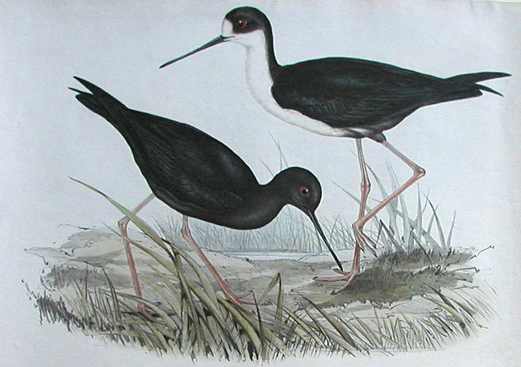
Black stilt (Himantopus novaezealandiae), compared with the closely related pied stilt (H. himantopus). Painted by John Gould.

== Description ==
Black stilts are a medium-sized (220 g) wader with extremely long pink legs, red eyes, distinctively black plumage, and a long slender black bill. Juveniles have a white breast, neck and head, with a black patch around the eyes, and black belly feathers that distinguish them from pied stilts. Black adult plumage appears in their first or second year. Black plumage may be an adaptation to "absorb heat better in the cold, windswept habitat of glacial riverbeds and lakeshores".

Hybrids between black and pied stilts are very variable in their plumage, but usually have black breast feathers, which pied stilts never do.

== Distribution and habitat ==
Although black stilts currently breed only in braided river systems in the South Island, subfossil bones show that prior to human arrival they were found in habitats as diverse as narrow bush streams in Hawkes Bay, and a wetland lake surrounded by forest in North Canterbury. In the nineteenth century they bred on riverbeds and in wetlands of the central and eastern North Island and most of the South Island except Fiordland. As late as the 1940s they were still common in South Canterbury and Central Otago, and nesting occurred in Central Otago as late as 1964. Throughout their range they have been almost entirely replaced by pied stilts, which colonised New Zealand after human settlement and now number approximately 30,000.

Currently black stilts breed only in the upper Waitaki River system in the Mackenzie Basin. Most black stilts will also overwinter in the Mackenzie Basin, but about 10% of the population, especially hybrids and those paired with pied stilts, migrate to North Island harbours such as Kawhia and Kaipara in January for the winter.

== Behaviour and ecology ==
=== Breeding ===
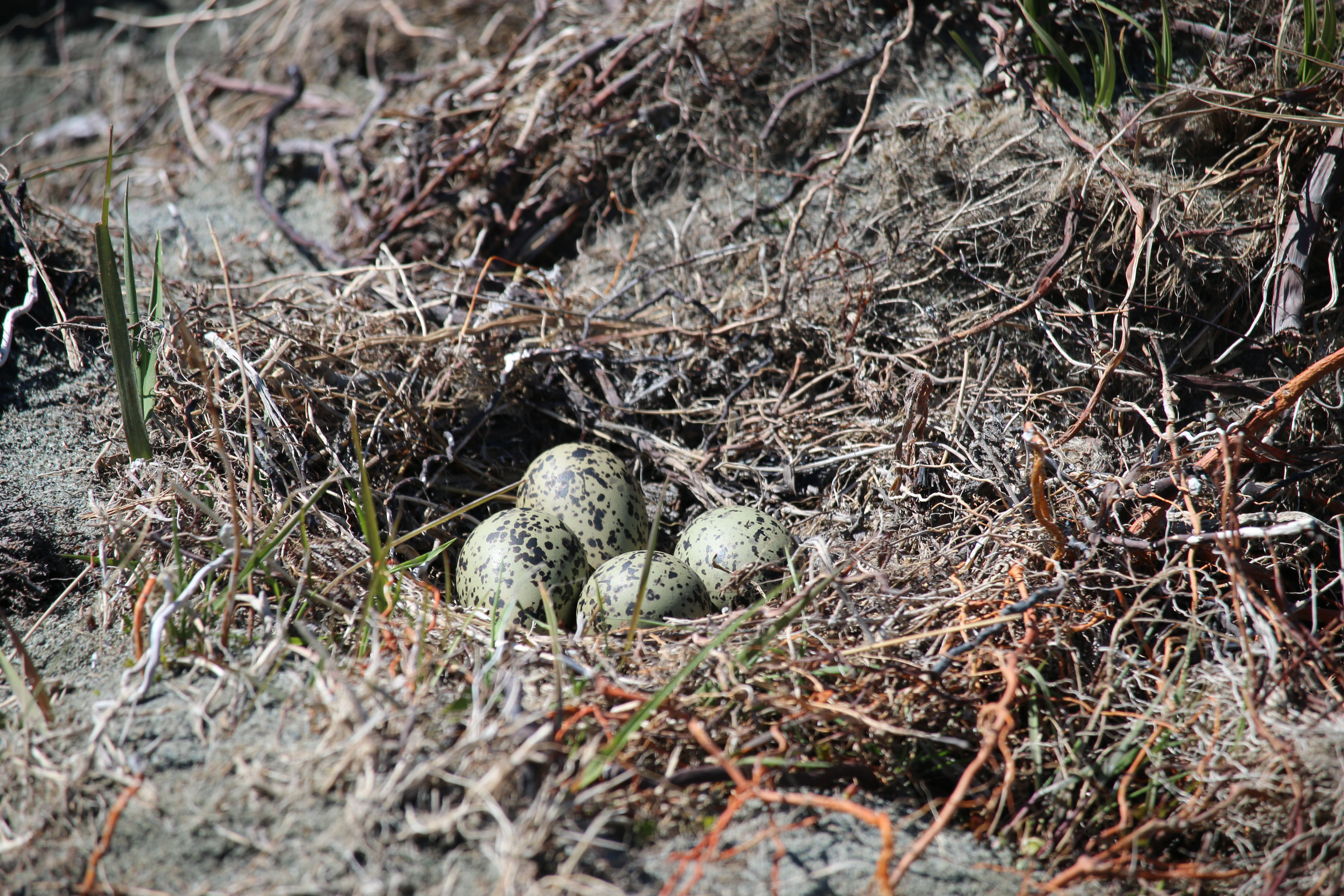
Kakī nest in the Mackenzie Basin.

External videos
- The Black Stilt (Short documentary showing breeding and predators)

Black stilts breed at 2 (more usually 3) years of age. They nest as solitary pairs, not in a protective colony like pied stilts. Both birds collaborate on building a nest in July or August on stable islands or banks in a shingle riverbed; pairs tend to nest in the same site each year. Three to five eggs are laid from September to December, peaking in October, and are incubated for roughly 25 days. Chicks take six to eight weeks to fledge, and remain with their parents for a further six to eight months.

== Conservation ==
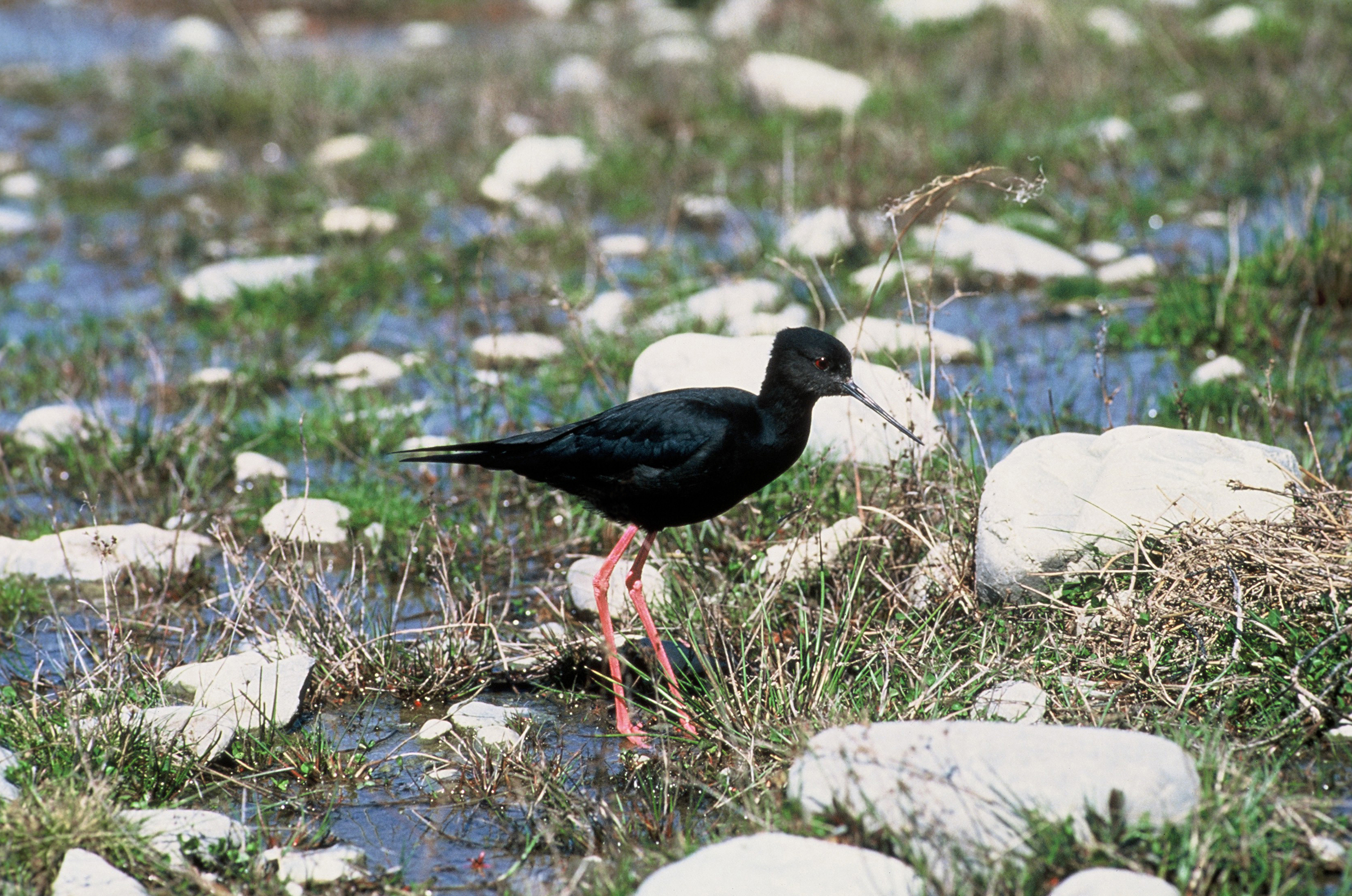
Black stilt near Twizel

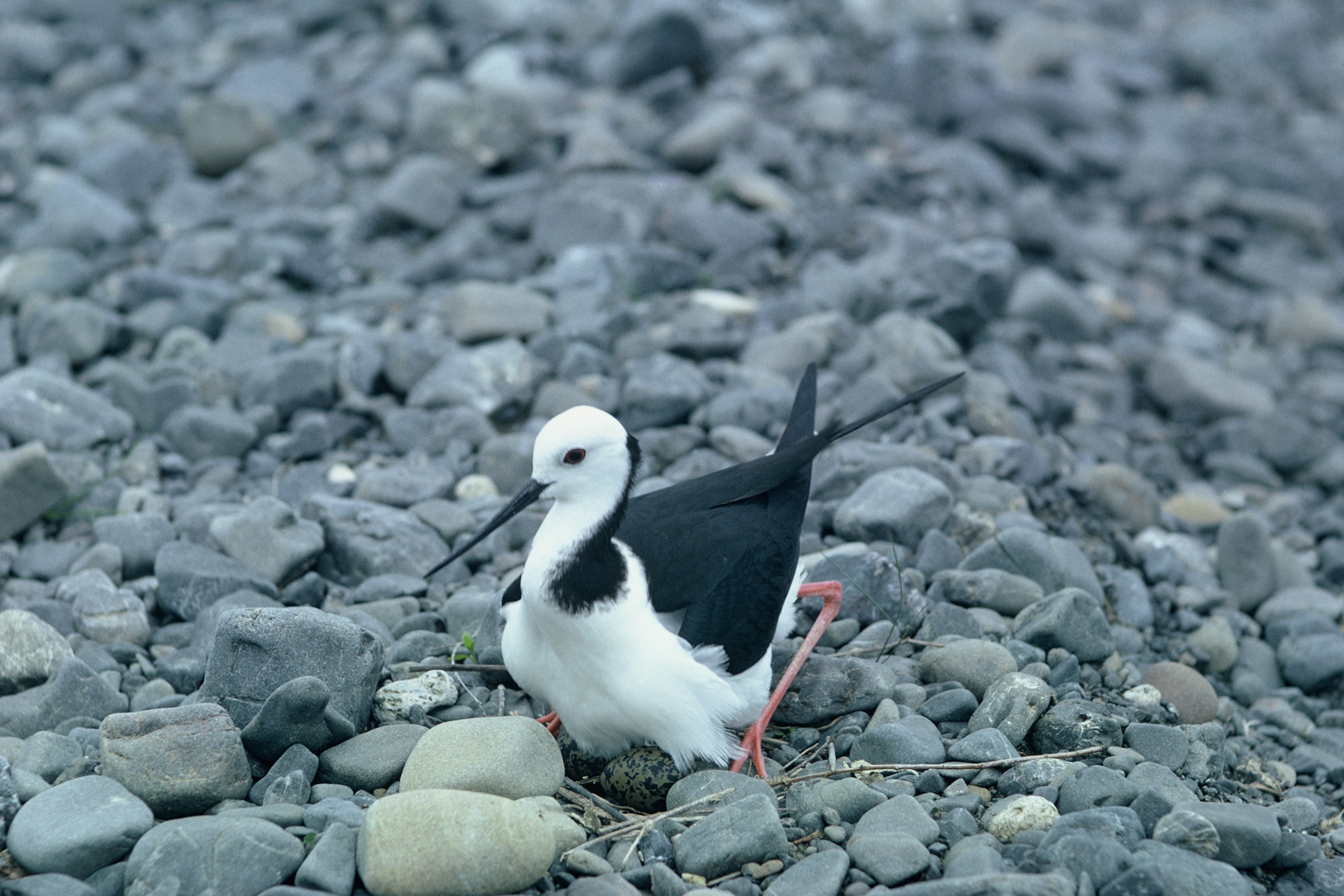
Pied stilt (Himantopus leucocephalus) on nest

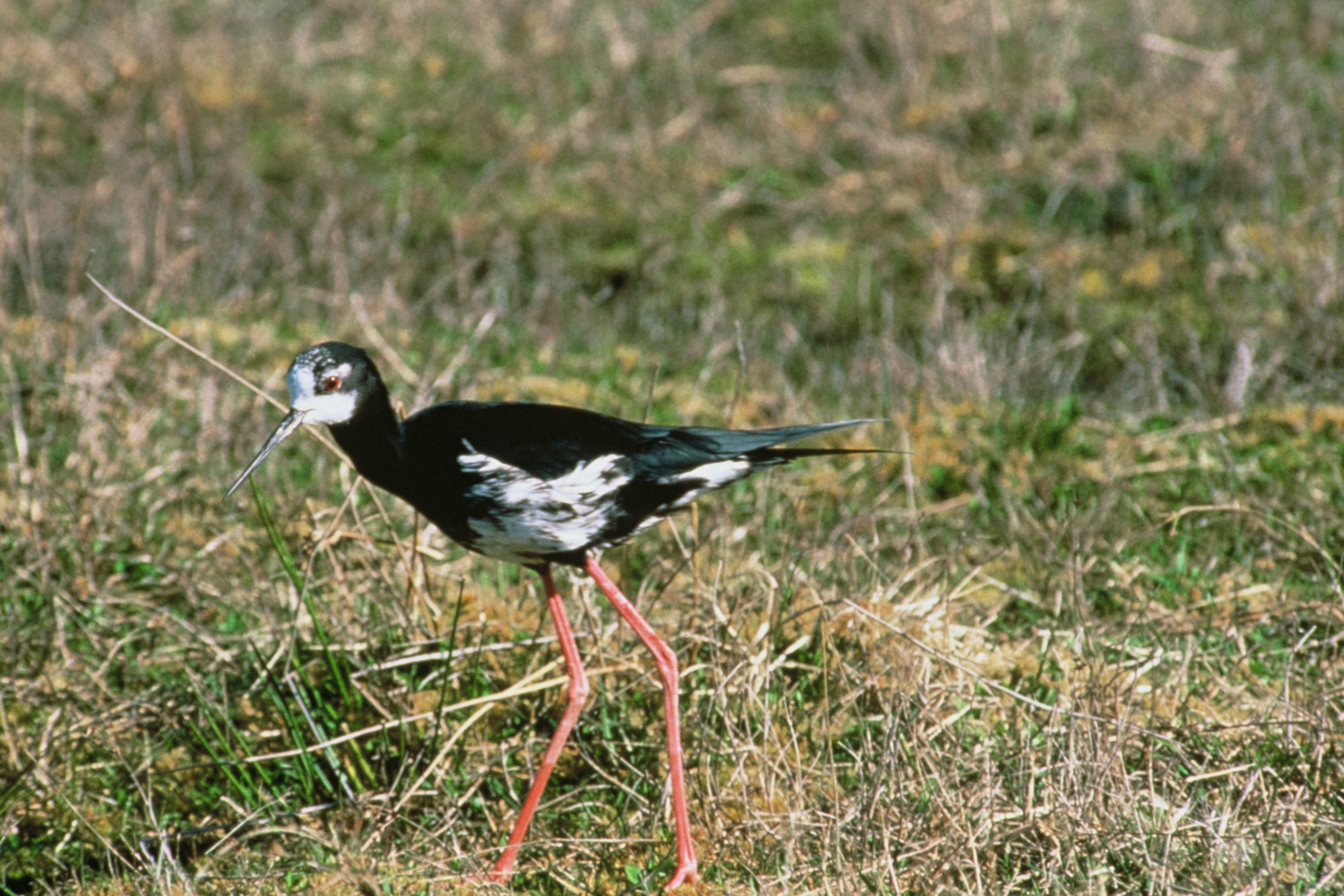
Hybrid (black × pied) stilt, showing node F plumage. (Hybrid black stilt colour patterns are described as 'nodes', ranging from 'A', closest to a pied stilt, to 'J', closest to a black stilt.)

Despite decades of intensive protection, the black stilt remains one of the rarest species of wading bird, and one of the most endangered birds in the world. The population may have numbered 500–1000 birds in the 1940s, but began to rapidly decline in the 1950s, and just 68 adults were counted in 1962. Intensive management began in 1981, when numbers had declined to just 23 adult birds. By 1984, there were 32 adults in the wild, rising to 52 by 1992 (with another 32 in captivity). As of May 2020 the wild population was estimated at 169 wild adult birds.

A captive population of kakī is maintained for breeding and subsequent wild release at a rearing facility in Twizel maintained by the Department of Conservation (DOC), and at the Isaac Conservation and Wildlife Trust in Christchurch. Eggs are collected every year for rearing, from both wild and captive birds. 2021 was the second-best year on record for breeding, with 39 breeding pairs; 175 eggs were collected and 66 left to hatch on nests. Each year juvenile captive-bred birds are released into the wild along the Godley, Cass, and Tasman rivers in Te Manahuna/Mackenzie Basin, in August or September; 130 in 2019, over 150 in 2021 and 143 in 2023. The annual release in the wild of captive-bred birds, combined with predator control, have probably prevented black stilt from becoming extinct.

=== Predators ===
Predation from mammalian invasive species poses the greatest threat to the survival of the species. In the 19th century, mustelids such as stoats, ferrets and weasels, as well as cats, were released into the Mackenzie Country to try to control the spread of rabbits. Black stilts are very vulnerable to these predators: they nest on the banks of streams and rivers, rather than islands; their nesting season begins in late winter, a time when rabbit numbers are low; and they currently nest as solitary pairs, so lose the protection of a colony (although they formed colonies in the past when numbers were higher). Compared with pied stilts, they have more noticeable plumage, are less likely to perform distraction displays while incubating, and their chicks take longer to fledge. Intensive trapping and electric fences are used around black stilt breeding sites to control predators. Because most kakī nest on private land, DOC works with landowners to create a predator trapping network.

=== Hybridisation ===
Hybridisation with far more numerous pied stilt is also a major threat to the black stilt gene pool. Hybridisation is a symptom of the continuing decline of the black stilt population; black stilts will choose the darkest-plumaged partner available, but mixed-species pairing can happen because potential black stilt mates are so rare. Black stilts mate for life, so those which pair with a pied stilt are lost to the breeding population.

=== Habitat loss ===
Black stilts rely on wetlands and braided riverbeds for feeding, and these have been extensively drained or modified for agriculture, irrigation, and flood control. Invasive weeds such as Russell lupin and crack willow are able to colonise braided riverbeds, reducing nesting habitat and providing cover for predators.

Because black stilts nest on braided river beds, they are threatened by changes in river flows as a result of new and existing hydroelectric dams. As part of the Upper Waitaki Power Development, braided riverbeds in the Upper Waitaki were receiving less water, which allowed weeds to encroach into black stilt breeding areas. These provided cover for predators, and from 1991 a new flow regime was introduced to reduce encroaching vegetation. Artificial lowering of the level of Lake Benmore, which caused exposure of shallow riverbed in the deltas of the rivers that feed it, created temporary foraging areas for black stilts.
