= Mount Conrad (New Zealand) =

Mountain in New Zealand

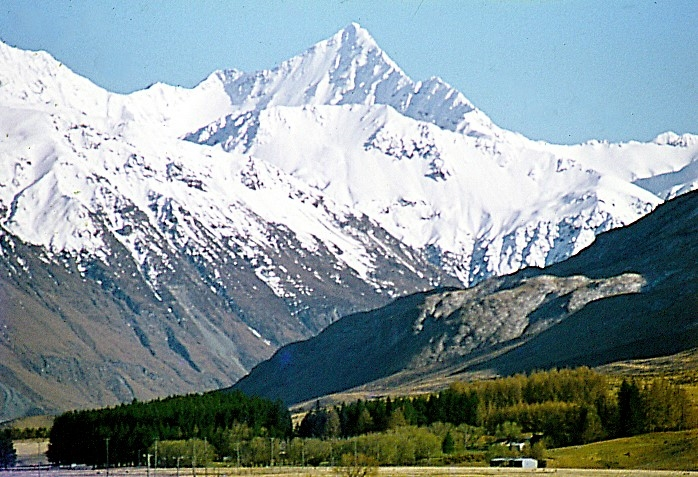
- Southeast aspect

Highest point
- Elevation: 2,598 m (8,524 ft)
- Prominence: 344 m (1,129 ft)
- Parent peak: Mount Hutton
- Isolation: 2.61 km (1.62 mi)
- Listing: New Zealand #45
- Coordinates: 43°33′40″S 170°25′09″E

Naming
- Etymology: Conrad Kain

Geography
- Location within New Zealand
- Interactive map of Mount Conrad
- Location: South Island
- Country: New Zealand
- Region: Canterbury
- Protected area: Aoraki / Mount Cook National Park
- Parent range: Southern Alps; Liebig Range
- Topo map(s): NZMS260 I36; Topo50 BX16

Climbing
- First ascent: January 1914

Mount Conrad is a 2,598-metre-elevation (8,524-foot) mountain in Canterbury, New Zealand. It is part of the Liebig Range.

== Description ==
Mount Conrad is set in the Liebig Range of the Southern Alps and is situated in the Canterbury Region of the South Island. This peak is located 22 kilometres (14 mi) east of Aoraki / Mount Cook and is within Aoraki / Mount Cook National Park. Precipitation runoff from the mountain drains west to the Murchison River, and east to the Godley River. Topographic relief is significant as the summit rises 1,300 metres (4,265 feet) above the Murchison Glacier in two kilometres. The nearest higher peak is Mount Ronald Adair, three kilometres to the south. This mountain's toponym honours Conrad Kain (1883–1934), an Austrian mountain guide who guided extensively in Europe, Canada, and New Zealand. The first ascent of the summit was made in January 1914 by Otto Frind and Conrad Kain. There is also a Mount Conrad in Canada named after him and also first climbed by him.

== Climate ==
Based on the Köppen climate classification, Mount Conrad is located in a marine west coast (Cfb) climate zone, with a subpolar oceanic climate (Cfc) at the summit. Prevailing westerly winds blow moist air from the Tasman Sea onto the mountains, where the air is forced upward by the mountains (orographic lift), causing moisture to drop in the form of rain or snow. The months of December through February offer the most favourable weather for viewing or climbing this peak.

== Climbing ==
Climbing routes with the first ascents:

- South Ridge – Otto Frind, Conrad Kain – (1914)
- North Ridge (descent) – K. Wade, I. Dainis – (1965)
- East Ridge – Philip Temple, Brian Turner – (1977)
- West Face – Shelley Hersey, Paul Hersey, Jamie Vinton-Boot – (2012)

== Gallery ==
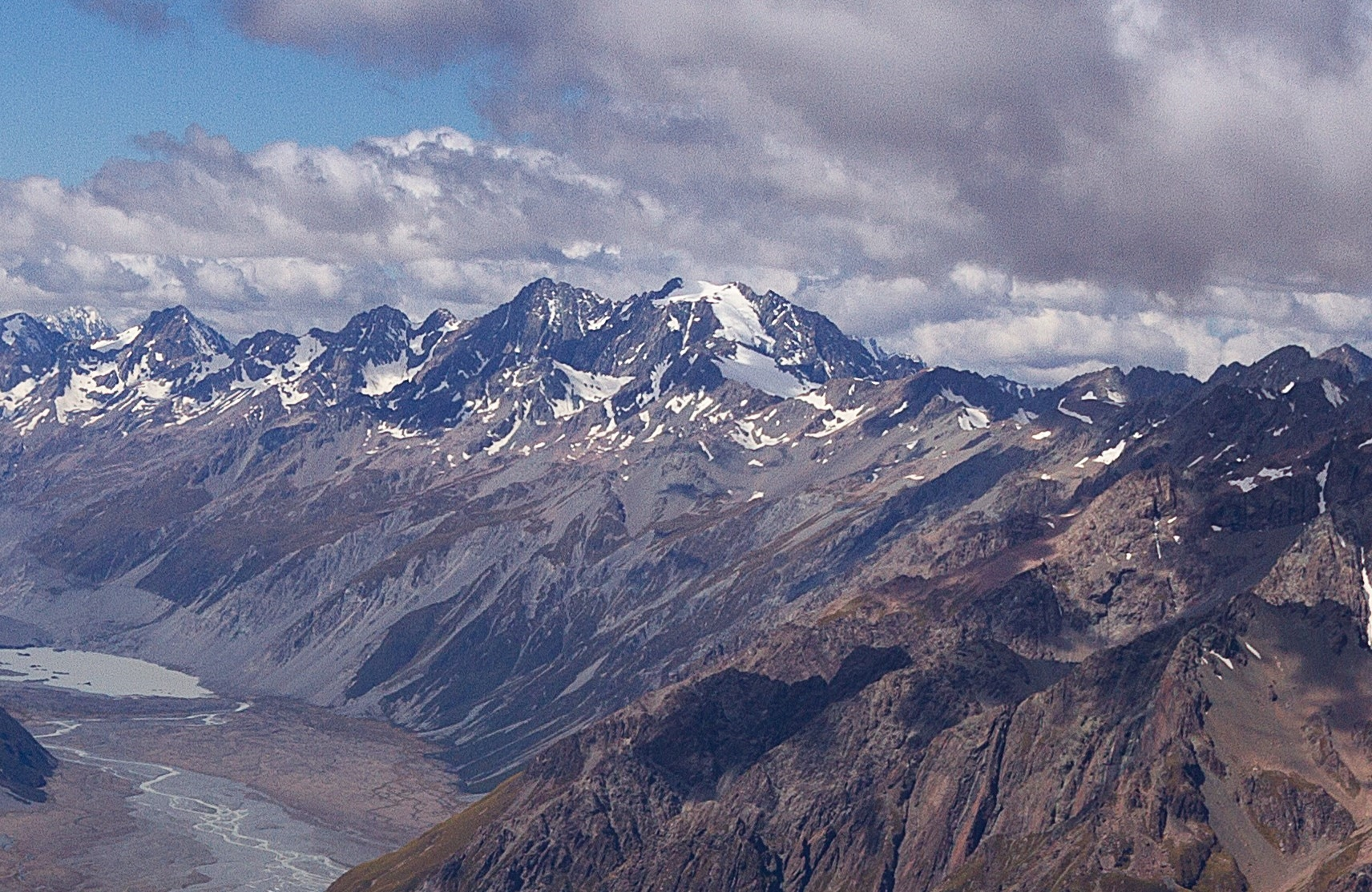
Southwest aspect of the Liebig Range.
Mount Conrad to left above lake, Mount Hutton centred

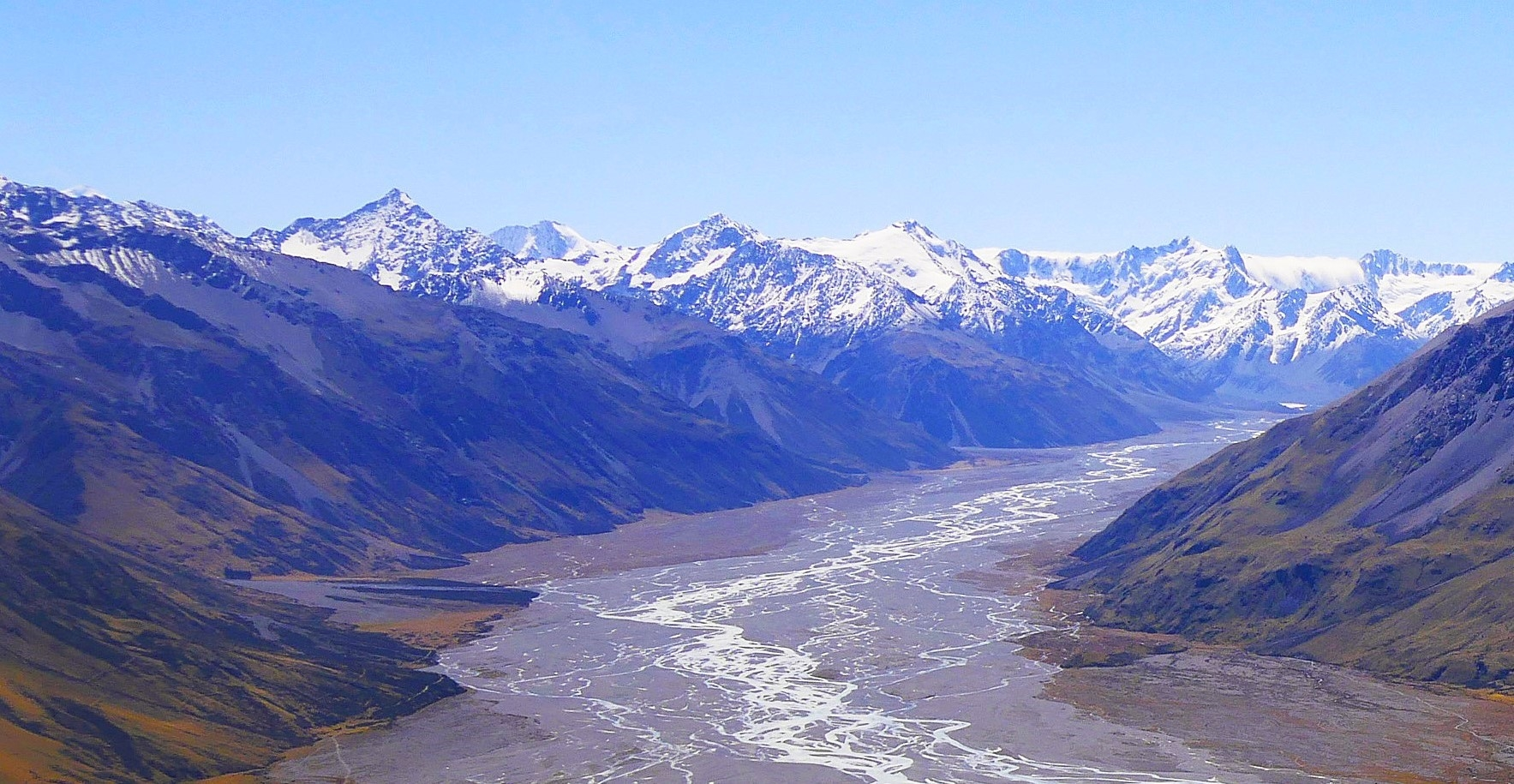
Southeast aspect of Conrad to the left above Godley River valley

== See also ==
- List of mountains of New Zealand by height
