= Mount Hutton =

Mount Hutton may refer to:

- Mount Hutton (New Zealand), a mountain in the Canterbury Region of New Zealand
- Mount Hutton, New South Wales, a suburb of the City of Lake Macquarie, New South Wales, Australia
- Mount Hutton, Queensland, a rural locality in the Maranoa Region, Queensland, Australia
