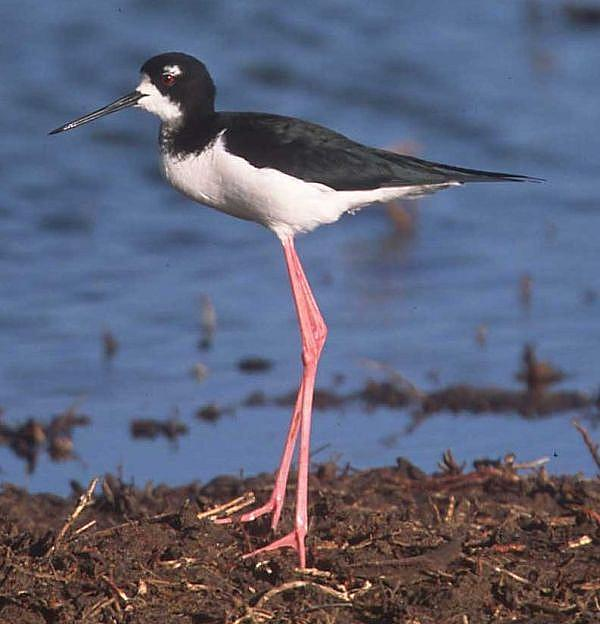
- Hawaiian stilt

Scientific classification
- Kingdom: Animalia
- Phylum: Chordata
- Class: Aves
- Order: Charadriiformes
- Suborder: Charadrii
- Family: Recurvirostridae; Bonaparte, 1854

Genera
- Recurvirostra; Himantopus; Cladorhynchus

= Recurvirostridae =

Family of birds

The Recurvirostridae are a family of birds in the wader suborder Charadrii. It contains two distinct groups of birds, the avocets (one genus) and the stilts (two genera).

== Description ==
Avocets and stilts range in length from 30 to 46 cm (12 to 18 in) and in weight from 140 to 435 g (4.9 to 15.3 oz); males are usually slightly bigger than females. All possess long, thin legs, necks, and bills. The bills of avocets are curved upwards, and are swept from side to side when the bird is feeding in the brackish or saline wetlands they prefer. The bills of stilts, in contrast, are straight. The front toes are webbed, partially in most stilts, and fully in avocets and the banded stilt, which swim more. The majority of species' plumage has contrasting areas of black and white, with some species having patches of buff or brown on the head or chest. The sexes are similar.

Their vocalizations are usually yelps of one or two syllables.

== Distribution and habitat ==
Avocets and stilts are a cosmopolitan family, being distributed on all the world's continents except Antarctica, and occurring on several oceanic islands. Several species are wide-ranging and a few are locally distributed.

One species, the black stilt of New Zealand, is critically endangered due to habitat loss, introduced predators, and hybridisation with the pied stilt.

== Feeding ==
These species feed on small aquatic animals such as mollusks, brine shrimp and other crustaceans, larval insects, segmented worms, tadpoles, and small fish.

== Breeding ==
Stilts and avocets breed on open ground near water, often in loose colonies. They defend nesting territories vigorously with aggressive displays, and mob intruders and possible predators with a great deal of noise. They are monogamous, although the pair bonds are not maintained from season to season. Their eggs are light-coloured with dark markings, weighing 22 to 44 g (0.78 to 1.55 oz). Three to four are laid in simple nests, and both parents share the incubation duties, which last 22 to 28 days. The banded stilt may breed only every few years, as it breeds on temporary lakes caused by rains in the deserts of Australia. The chicks are downy and precocial, leaving the nest within a day of hatching; they fledge in 28 to 35 days. In all species except the banded stilt, the chicks are cared for by the parents for several months, and they may move them to new areas and defend territories there. Banded stilts deviate from this by collecting their chicks in massive crèches numbering several hundred.

== Taxonomy ==
The taxonomy of the stilts is particularly debated, with the genus Himantopus considered to have two to six species.

Species in the family Recurvirostridae
Common and binomial names	Image	Range	Notes
Banded stilt Cladorhynchus leucocephalus		southern Australia	
Black-winged stilt Himantopus himantopus		Europe, Asia and Africa	Sometimes includes pied (H. leucocephalus), white-backed (H. melanurus) and black-necked stilts (H. mexicanus) as subspecies
Pied stilt Himantopus (himantopus) leucocephalus		Southeast Asia to Australia and New Zealand	
Black-necked stilt Himantopus (himantopus) mexicanus		North America to northern South America, and Hawaii	Includes Hawaiian stilt (H. m. knudseni) and sometimes also white-backed stilt (H. melanurus) as subspecies
Black stilt Himantopus novaezelandiae		South Island of New Zealand	
American avocet Recurvirostra americana		North America	
Andean avocet Recurvirostra andina		Andes in South America	
Pied avocet Recurvirostra avosetta		Europe, Asia and Africa	
Red-necked avocet Recurvirostra novaehollandiae		Australia	
