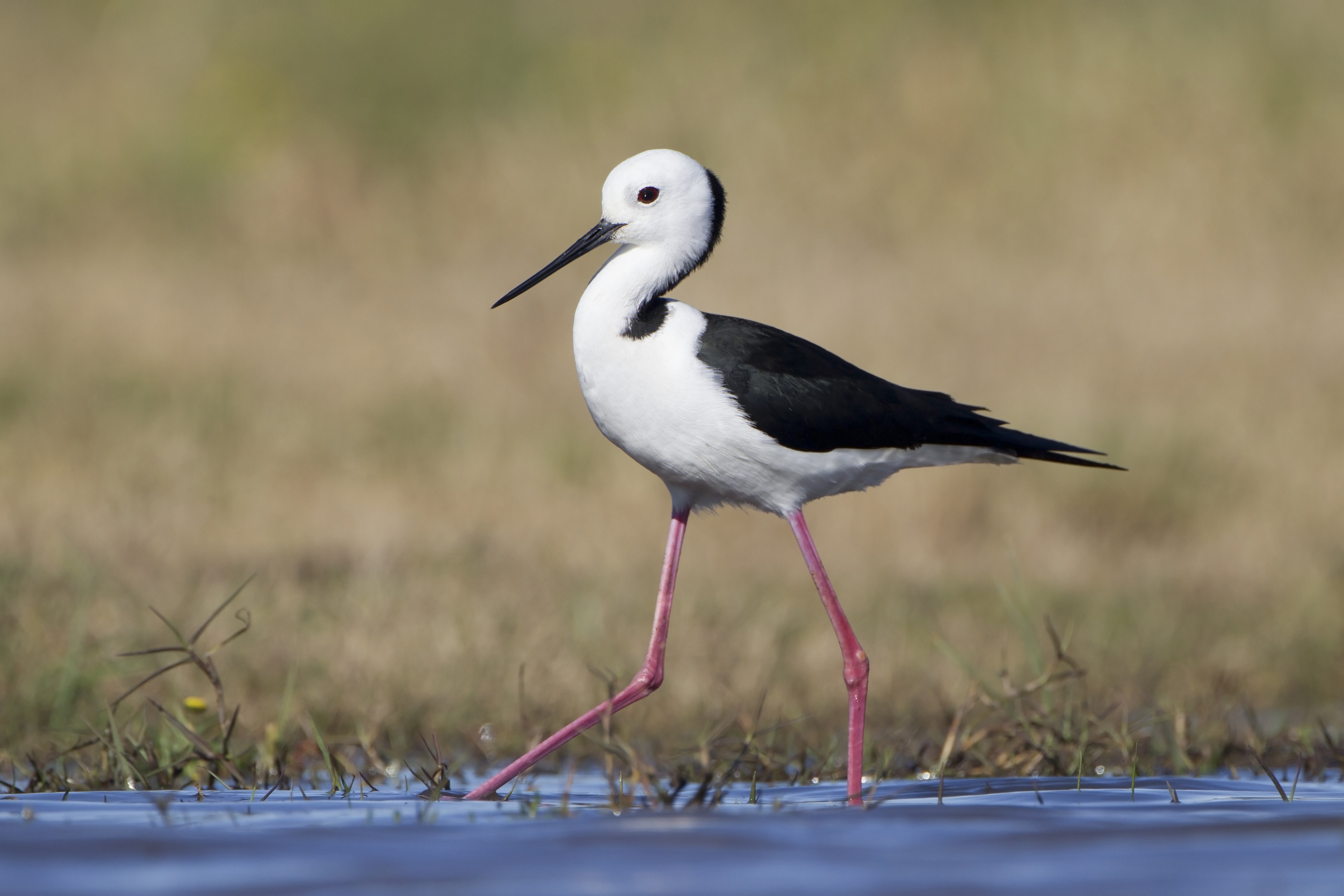
- Adult pied stilt

Conservation status
- Least Concern (IUCN 3.1)

Scientific classification
- Kingdom: Animalia
- Phylum: Chordata
- Class: Aves
- Order: Charadriiformes
- Family: Recurvirostridae
- Genus: Himantopus
- Species: H. leucocephalus

Binomial name
- Himantopus leucocephalus Gould, 1837

Synonyms
- Himantopus himantopus leucocephalus

= Pied stilt =

Species of bird

The pied stilt (Himantopus leucocephalus), also known as the white-headed stilt, is a shorebird in the family Recurvirostridae. It is widely distributed with a large total population size and apparently stable population trend, occurring in Malaysia, Japan, the Philippines, Brunei, Christmas Island, Indonesia, Palau, Papua New Guinea, Australia, and New Zealand. It is listed as Least Concern on the IUCN Red List. It is sometimes considered a subspecies of the black-winged stilt (H. himantopus).

== Taxonomy ==
Himantopus leucocephalus was the scientific name proposed by John Gould in 1837 who described a pied stilt from Australia.

== Description ==
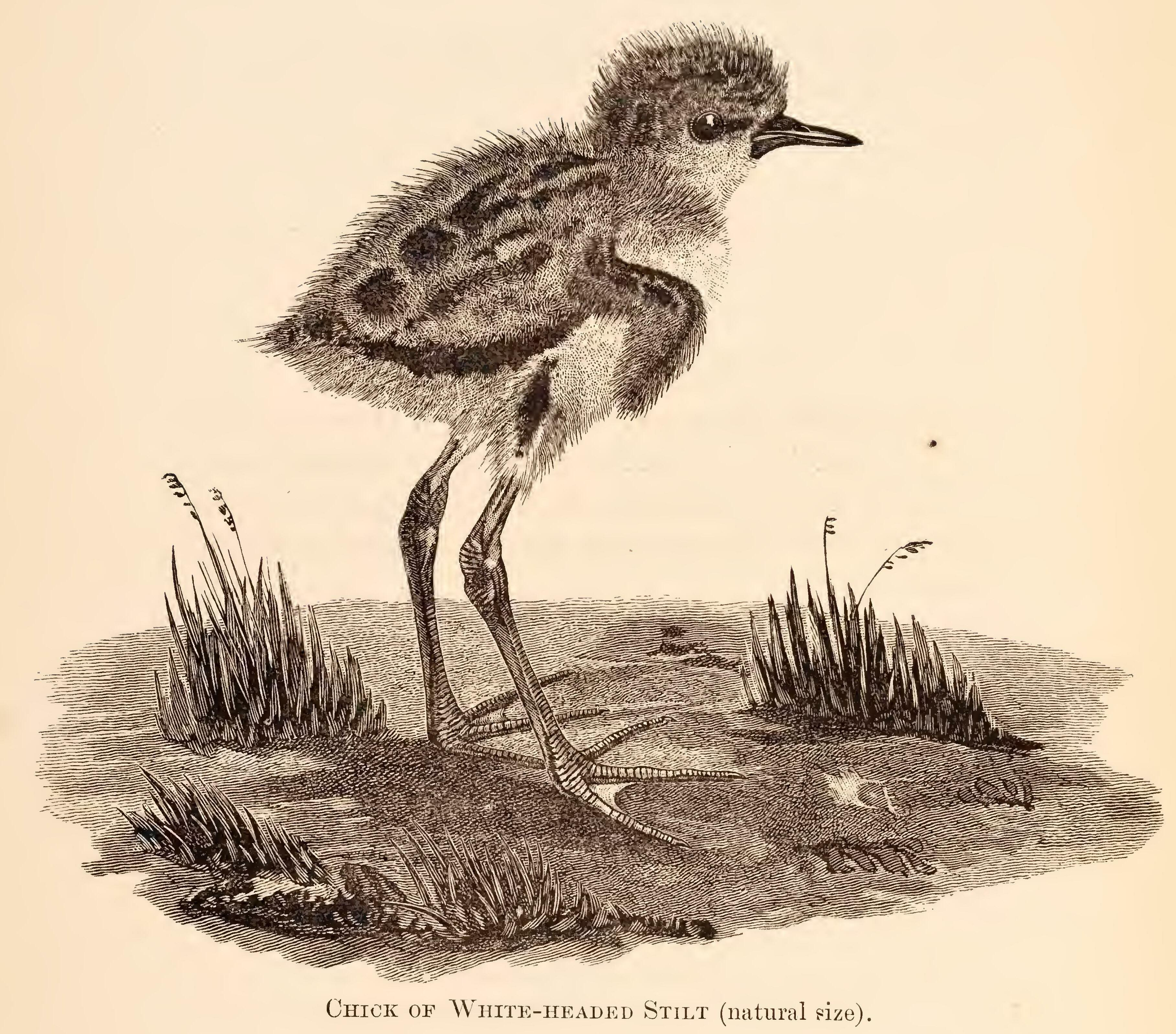
An illustration of a juvenile pied stilt (1888)

The pied stilt grows to a length of about 14 in (36 cm) with a wingspan of about 26.5 in (67 cm). The back of the head and neck, the back and the upper surfaces of the wings are glossy greenish-black. The undersides of the wings are plain black and the remainder of the plumage is white, apart from the tail feathers which are tinged with grey. The long, thin legs are pink and the toes have black claws. The long slender beak is black and the irises and the eyelids are red.

== Distribution and habitat ==
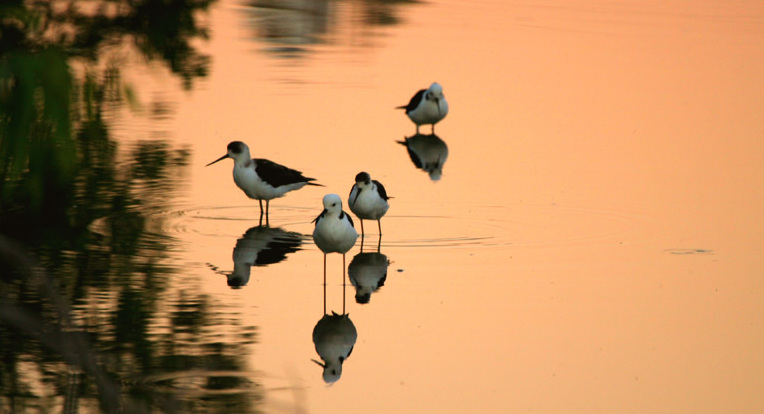
Adult and immature pied stilts in Kewdale, Western Australia

The pied stilt is resident in southern Sumatra, Java, Sulawesi and most of Australia, New Zealand and Papua New Guinea. There are non-breeding populations in Sri Lanka, the Philippines, Brunei, Palau, South Kalimantan, West Nusa Tenggara, East Nusa Tenggara, East Timor and New Guinea. This bird is a vagrant to Japan and Christmas Island. Its habitat is in wetlands and estuaries.

== Behaviour and ecology ==
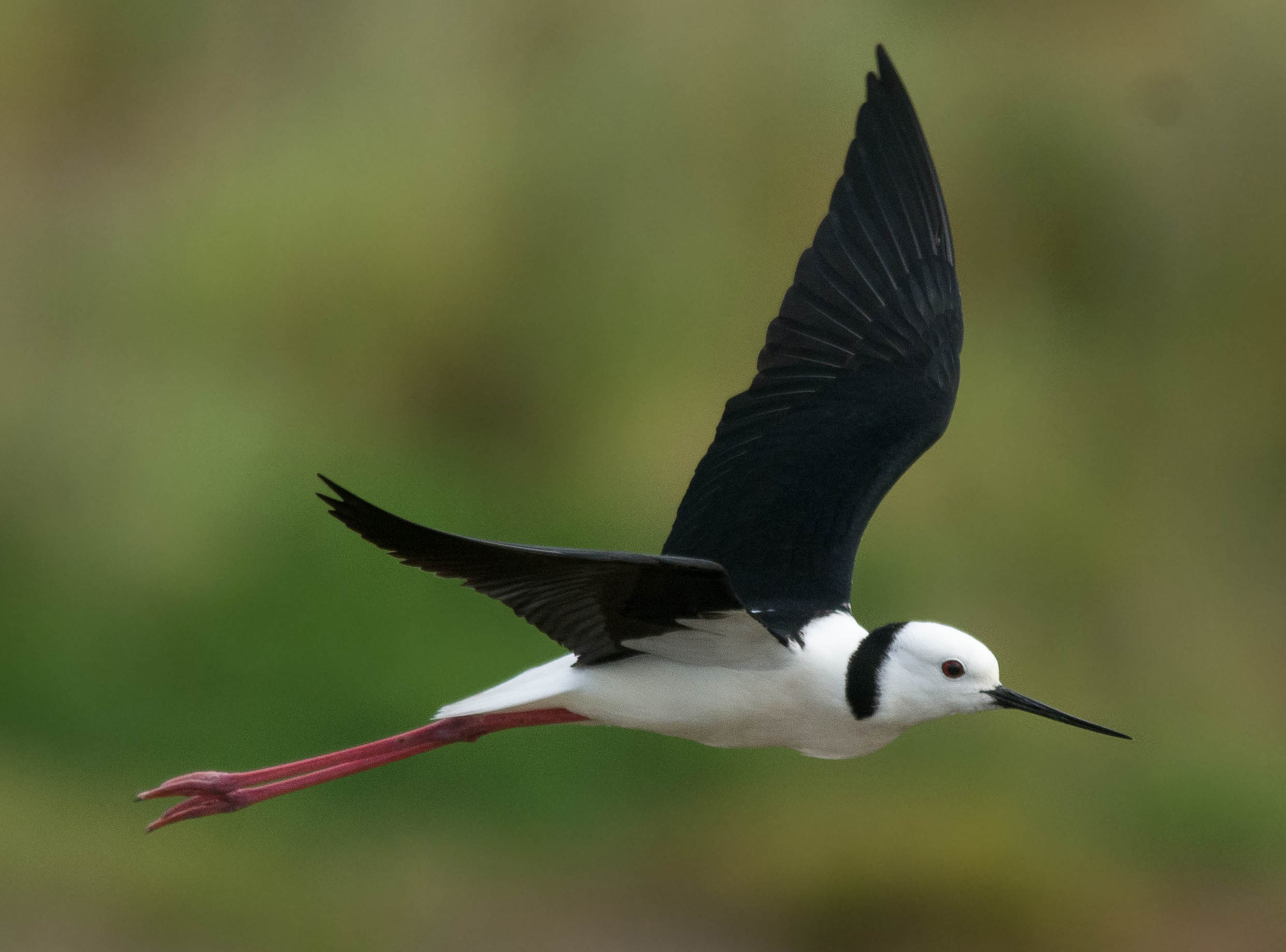
Pied stilt in flight

The pied stilt is a waterbird and feeds in shallow water, probing into the sediment with its beak. It is gregarious, and in New Zealand sometimes forms mixed flocks with the black stilt (Himantopus novaezelandiae). It feeds largely on aquatic insects and on small molluscs. It emits a repeated yelping cry as it flies, and the legs trail behind it, tending to sway from side-to-side.

The pied stilt breeds in spring, choosing as a nesting site an area of sand or shingle by an estuary, beside a dried up riverbed, on a flat bit of coast or in a grassy field near the sea. It seems particularly attracted to locations near where the red duck-weed (Azolla rubra) flourishes. It prepares a nest in a shallow depression or in a scrape in the ground where it usually lays four, ovoido-conical eggs. These are yellowish-brown dappled irregularly with dark blotches and spots. The nest is difficult to find as the eggs are well-camouflaged. But the parent birds give away the presence of the nest by mounting into the air and flying in circles, uttering distress cries. The chicks are able to leave the nest almost as soon as they have hatched. They are difficult to detect because their downy plumage is well-camouflaged and they "freeze" when alarmed. A parent bird sometimes feigns a leg injury to draw intruders away from its chicks.
