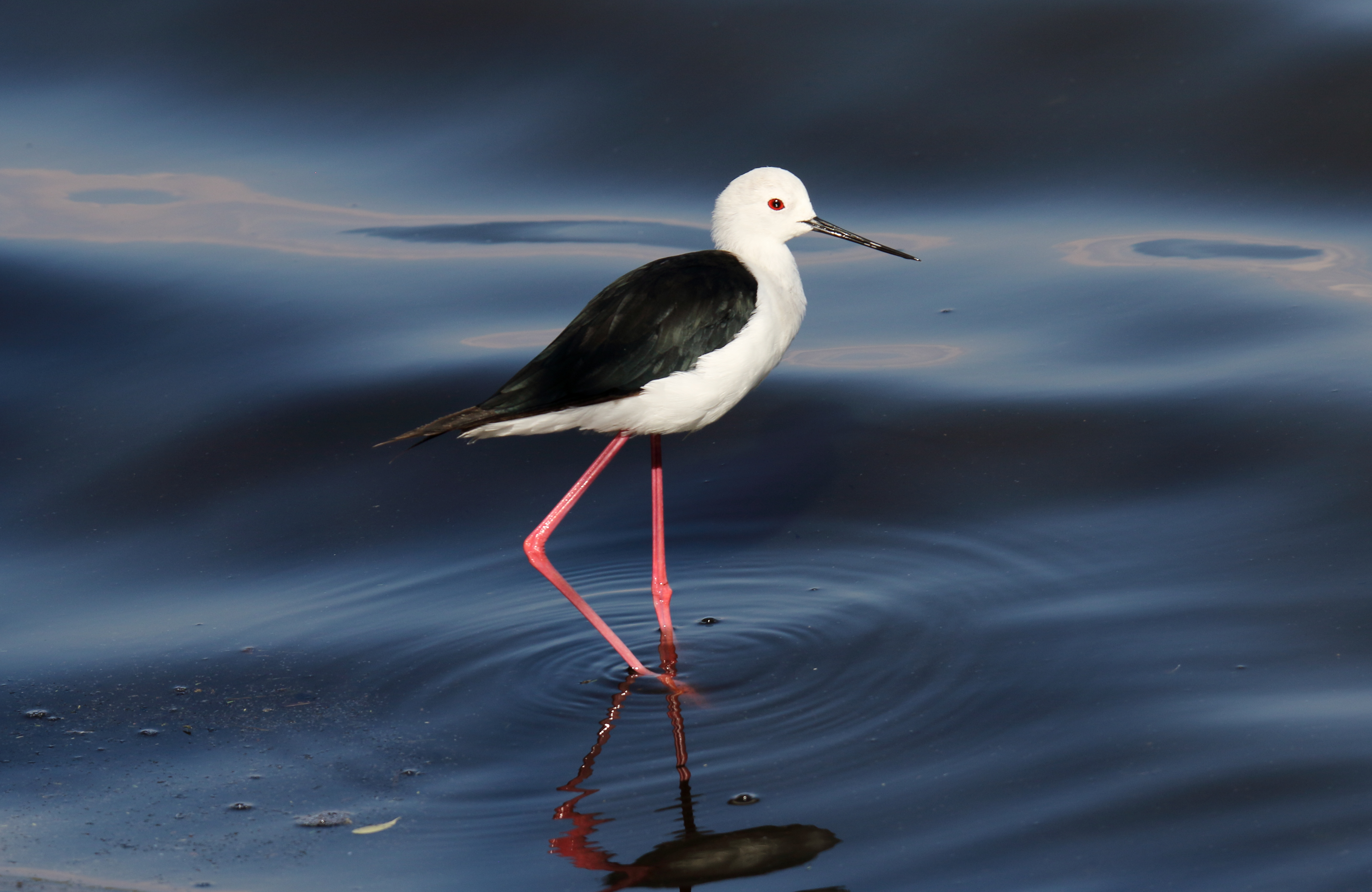
- Adult black-winged stilt in Tanzania

Scientific classification
- Kingdom: Animalia
- Phylum: Chordata
- Class: Aves
- Order: Charadriiformes
- Family: Recurvirostridae
- Genus: Himantopus; Brisson, 1760

Type species
- Charadrius himantopus Linnaeus, 1758

= Stilt =

Common name for several species of bird

Stilt is a common name for several species of birds in the family Recurvirostridae, which also includes those known as avocets. Most sources recognize 6 species in 2 genera, with Himantopus being the more speciose genus, though the lone species of Cladorhynchus is also considered a stilt. Additionally, the white-backed and Hawaiian stilts are occasionally considered subspecies of the black-necked stilt.

Stilts are found in brackish or saline wetlands in warm or hot climates. They have extremely long legs, hence the group name, and long thin bills. Stilts typically feed on aquatic insects and other small creatures and nest on the ground surface in loose colonies.

== Taxonomy ==
The genus Himantopus was introduced by the French zoologist Mathurin Jacques Brisson in 1760 with the black-winged stilt (Himantopus himantopus) as the type species. The generic name Himantopus comes from the Ancient Greek meaning "strap-leg".

=== Species ===
The genus Himantopus contains four species:

- Black-winged stilt, Himantopus himantopus
- Pied stilt, Himantopus leucocephalus
- Black-necked stilt, Himantopus mexicanus
  - White-backed stilt, Himantopus mexicanus melanurus
  - Hawaiian stilt or aeʻo, Himantopus mexicanus knudseni
- Black stilt, Himantopus novaezelandiae

The genus Cladorhynchus is monotypic and contains a single species:

- Banded stilt, Cladorhynchus leucocephalus

A fossil stilt has been described by Bickart, 1990, as Himantopus olsoni, based on remains recovered in the Late Miocene Big Sandy Formation of Mohave County, Arizona, United States.
