= Mount Conrad (Canada) =

Mountain in British Columbia, Canada

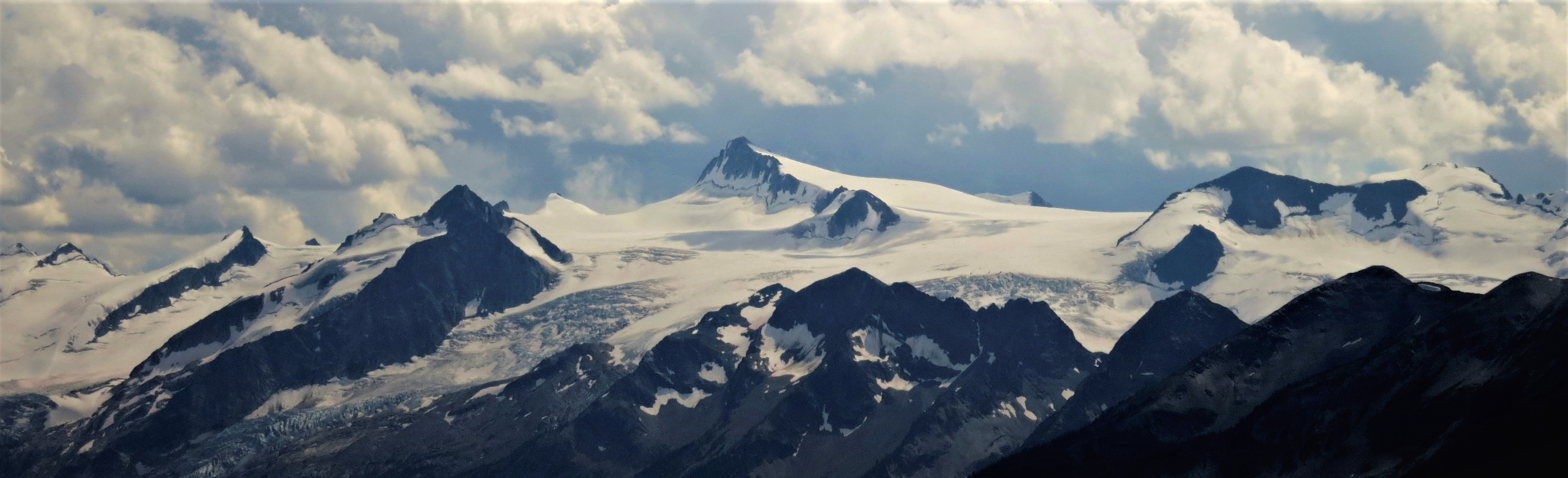
- North aspect, centered

Highest point
- Elevation: 3,279 m (10,758 ft)
- Prominence: 799 m (2,621 ft)
- Parent peak: Howser Spire (3,412 m)
- Isolation: 7.55 km (4.69 mi)
- Listing: Mountains of British Columbia
- Coordinates: 50°46′13″N 116°53′57″W

Naming
- Etymology: Conrad Kain

Geography
- Location within British Columbia Location within Canada
- Interactive map of Mount Conrad
- Country: Canada
- Province: British Columbia
- District: Kootenay Land District
- Protected area: Bugaboo Provincial Park
- Parent range: Purcell Mountains
- Topo map: NTS 82K15 Bugaboo Creek

Geology
- Rock type: Granodiorite

Climbing
- First ascent: August 1933, I.A. Richards and Dorothy Pilley Richards with Conrad Kain

Mount Conrad is a 3,279-metre (10,758-foot) mountain summit in British Columbia, Canada.

== Description ==
Mount Conrad is located in The Bugaboos area, on the west side of Bugaboo Provincial Park. It is part of the Purcell Mountains which are a subset of the Columbia Mountains. Mount Conrad is more notable for its steep rise above local terrain than for its absolute elevation as topographic relief is significant with the summit rising 1,900 meters (6,233 ft) above Giegerich Creek in 5 km (3.1 mi). Precipitation runoff from Mount Conrad drains northeast to the Columbia River via Vowell Creek, and southwest to Duncan River via Giegerich and East creeks.

== History ==
The mountain's name honors Conrad Kain (1883–1934), an eminent mountain guide in British Columbia's Purcell Mountains. He is credited with more than 60 first ascents in the Rockies and Purcells, including first ascents of the 3 highest peaks of the Canadian Rockies; and Howser Spire and Bugaboo Spire in the Bugaboos. The mountain's toponym was published in "A Climber's Guide to the Interior Ranges of British Columbia" by J.M. Thorington in 1947, and it was officially adopted on November 15, 1962, by the Geographical Names Board of Canada.

The first ascent of the summit was made in 1933 by Dr. I. A. Richards with his wife Dorothy Pilley Richards, guided by Conrad Kain. The mountain was named in 1935 by I. A. Richards.

There is also a Mount Conrad in New Zealand named after him and also first climbed by him.

== Climate ==
Based on the Köppen climate classification, Mount Conrad is located in a subarctic climate zone with cold, snowy winters, and mild summers. Winter temperatures can drop below −20 °C with wind chill factors below −30 °C. This climate supports the Conrad Icefield covering the peak's northern slope.

== Gallery ==
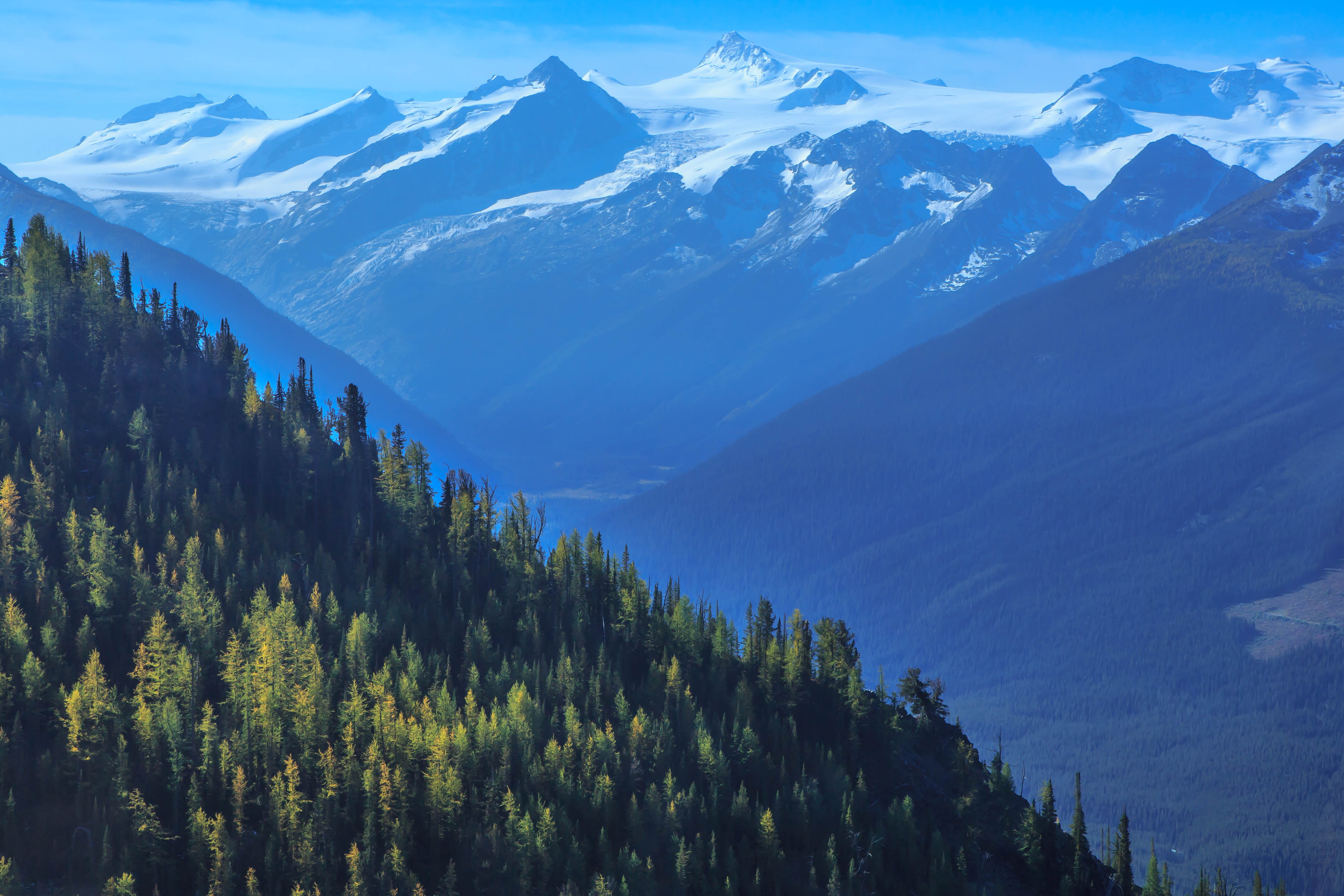
Mount Conrad centered at top

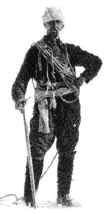
Conrad Kain

== See also ==
- The Bugaboos
- Geography of British Columbia
