= Cass River (Mackenzie District) =

Location
- Country: New Zealand

Physical characteristics
- Source
  - location: Hall Range
  - elevation: 1,900 m (6,200 ft)
- Mouth
  - location: Lake Tekapo
  - coordinates: 43°53′04″S 170°30′47″E
  - elevation: 710 m (2,330 ft)
- Length: 38 km (24 mi)

The Cass River is an alpine river in the Canterbury region of the South Island of New Zealand. It rises in the Hall Range immediately below Rankin Pass, and also receives water from the nearby Huxley Glacier on Mount Hutton. After dropping 600 metres (2,000 ft) very rapidly the river flows south with braided channels along a flat-bottomed valley for 25 kilometres (16 mi). The Leibig Range and Gamack Range are to the west, and the Haszard Range to the east. The river flows into the west side of Lake Tekapo where it has built up a gravel delta.

The Cass River is named for Thomas Cass, Chief Surveyor of Canterbury Province from 1851 to 1867.
