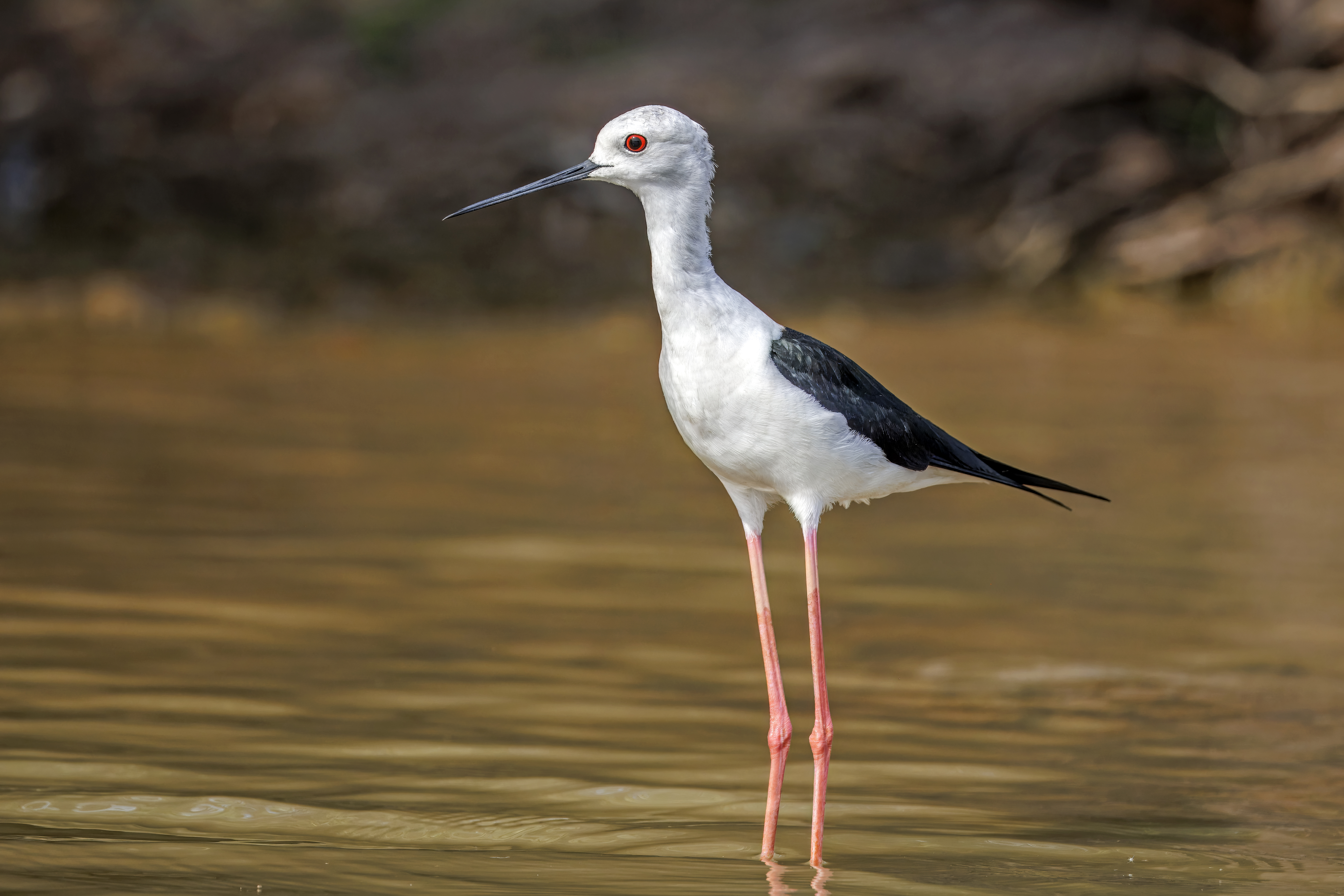
- Black-winged stilt in Cambodia

Conservation status
- Least Concern (IUCN 3.1)

Scientific classification
- Kingdom: Animalia
- Phylum: Chordata
- Class: Aves
- Order: Charadriiformes
- Family: Recurvirostridae
- Genus: Himantopus
- Species: H. himantopus

Binomial name
- Himantopus himantopus (Linnaeus, 1758)
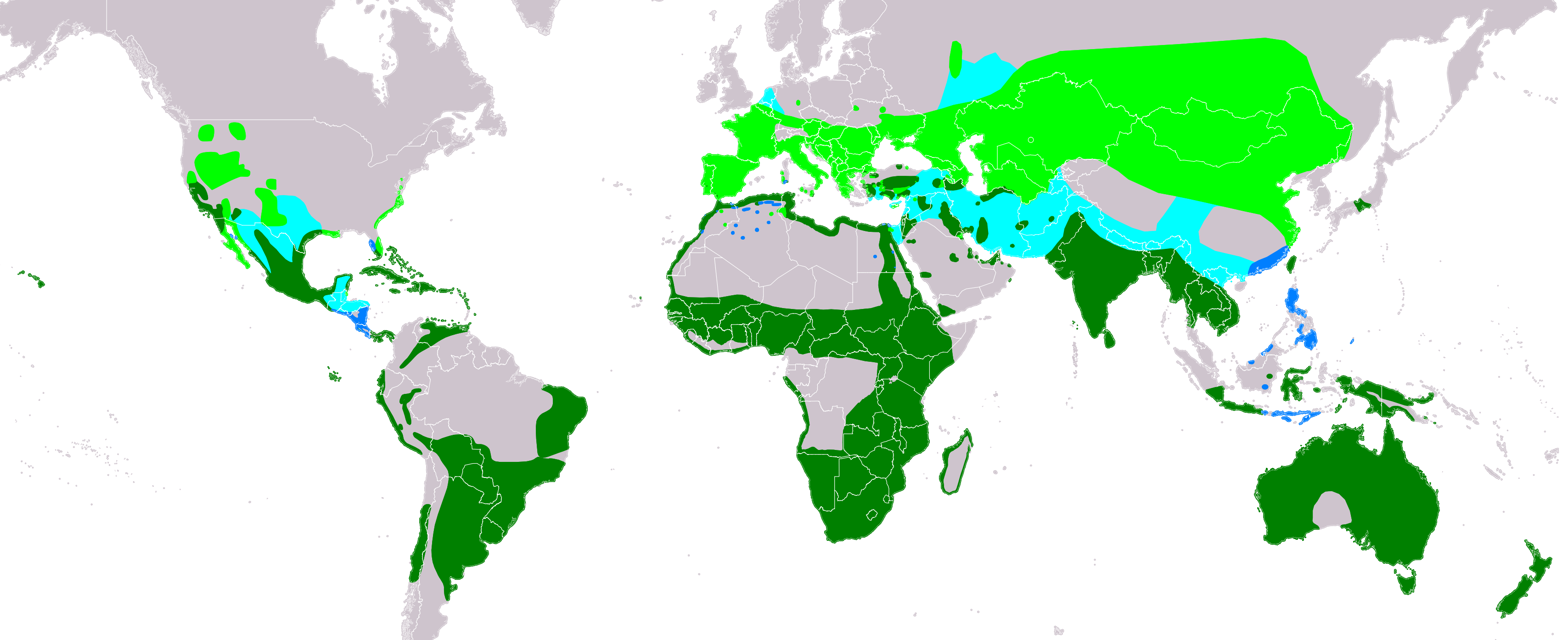
- Range of H. himantopus (sensu lato, see text) Breeding Resident Passage Non-breeding

Synonyms
- Charadrius himantopus Linnaeus, 1758

= Black-winged stilt =

Species of bird

The black-winged stilt (Himantopus himantopus) is a widely distributed, very long-legged wader in the avocet and stilt family Recurvirostridae. Its scientific name is sometimes used to generalize a single, almost cosmopolitan species. Alternatively, it is restricted to the form that is widespread in Europe, Asia and Africa, which equals the nominate subspecies group of H. himantopus sensu lato. Meanwhile, the black-necked (H. mexicanus) and white-backed stilts (H. melanurus) both inhabit the Americas; the pied stilt (H. leucocephalus) ranges from Australia and New Zealand. Today, most sources accept between one and four actual species.

== Taxonomy ==
The black-winged stilt was formally described in 1758 by the Swedish naturalist Carl Linnaeus in the tenth edition of his Systema Naturae. He placed it with the plovers in the genus Charadrius and coined the binomial name Charadrius himantopus. He specified the type locality as southern Europe. The taxonomic name Himantopus comes from Greek, meaning "strap-foot" or "thong-foot". The black-winged stilt is now one of five species placed in the genus Himantopus that was introduced by the French naturalist Mathurin Jacques Brisson in 1760. The species is monotypic: no subspecies are recognised.

The taxonomy of this bird is still somewhat contentious; it is one of four distinct species, which sometimes are considered subspecies of H. himantopus. H. himantopus sensu lato is made up of a single species, with 5–7 subspecies, and is sometimes referred to as the common stilt. The name "black-winged stilt" refers to H. himantopus sensu stricto, with two subspecies (H.h. himantopus from the Palearctic to South Asia, and H.h. meridionalis from the Afrotropical region).

== Description ==
Adults are 33–36 cm (13–14 in) long, with long, pink legs, and a long, rather thin black bill. The birds are generally black above and white below, with a white head and neck (with a varying amount of black, species-dependent). Males have a black back, often with a greenish gloss or sheen. Females' backs have a brownish hue, contrasting with the black remiges. In populations where the top of the head is normally white (at least in winter), females tend to have less black on the head and neck the entire year-round, while males often have much more black, particularly in summer. This difference is not clear-cut, however, and males usually grow all-white head feathers in winter.

Immature black-winged stilt are grey and have a markedly sandy hue on their wings, with light feather fringes appearing as a whitish line in flight.

Flight Call of H. h. himantopus
Recorded in India

== Ecology and status ==
The breeding habitat of all these stilts is marshes, shallow lakes and ponds. Some populations are migratory and move to the ocean coasts in winter; those in warmer regions are generally resident or short-range vagrants. In Europe, the black-winged stilt is a regular spring overshoot vagrant north of its normal range, occasionally remaining to breed in northern European countries. Pairs successfully bred in Britain in 1987, and after a 27-year hiatus there were two instances of successful breeding in Southern England in 2014. Thirteen young were fledged in southern England in 2017. Four chicks were successfully fledged in northern England in 2022; this is believed to be the most northerly breeding success for the black-winged stilt.
