= Mount Hutton (New Zealand) =

Mountain in New Zealand

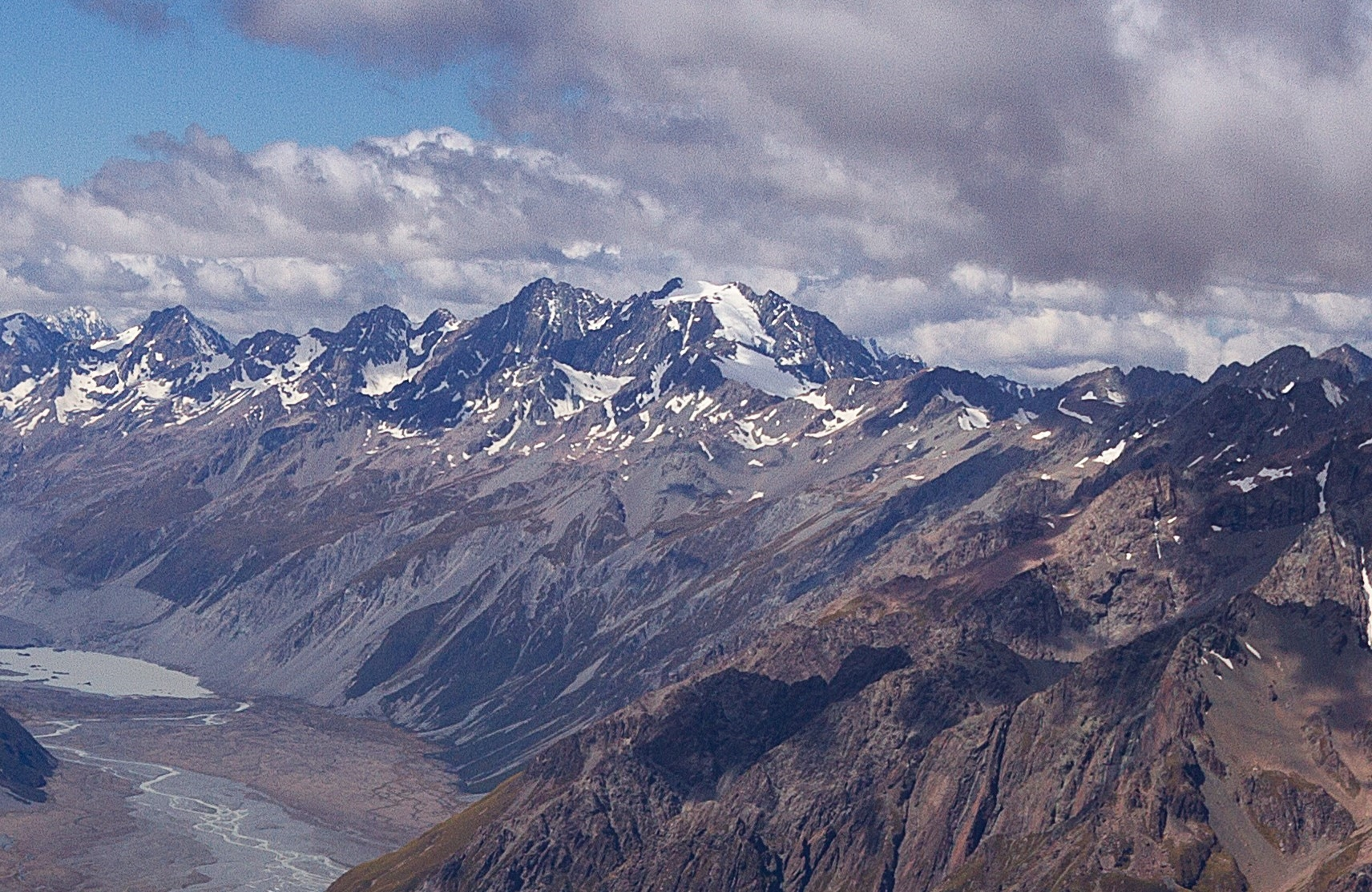
- Mount Hutton centred, from southwest

Highest point
- Elevation: 2,822 m (9,259 ft)
- Prominence: 673 m (2,208 ft)
- Isolation: 7.26 km (4.51 mi)
- Listing: New Zealand #17
- Coordinates: 43°36′16″S 170°23′29″E

Naming
- Etymology: Frederick Hutton

Geography
- Location within New Zealand
- Interactive map of Mount Hutton
- Location: South Island
- Country: New Zealand
- Region: Canterbury
- Protected area: Aoraki / Mount Cook National Park
- Parent range: Southern Alps; Liebig Range
- Topo map(s): NZMS260 I36; Topo50 BX16

Climbing
- First ascent: 1914

Mount Hutton is a 2,822-metre-elevation (9,259-foot) mountain in Canterbury, New Zealand.

== Description ==
Mount Hutton is the highest peak in the Liebig Range of the Southern Alps, and is situated in the Canterbury Region of the South Island. This peak is located 20 kilometres (12 mi) east of Aoraki / Mount Cook on the eastern boundary of Aoraki / Mount Cook National Park. Precipitation runoff from the mountain's north and west slopes drains to the Murchison River, whereas the south and east slopes drain into the headwaters of the Cass River. Topographic relief is significant as the summit rises 1,740 metres (5,709 feet) above the Murchison Valley in four kilometres. The nearest higher peak is Mount Hamilton, seven kilometres to the northwest. The first ascent of the summit was made in January 1914 by Otto Friend and Conrad Kain. This mountain was named by mountaineer Guy Mannering to honour Frederick Hutton (1836–1905), the New Zealand scientist, geological explorer, co-founder of the New Zealand Alpine Club, and curator of the Canterbury Museum.

== Climate ==
Based on the Köppen climate classification, Mount Hutton is located in a marine west coast (Cfb) climate zone, with a subpolar oceanic climate (Cfc) at the summit. Prevailing westerly winds blow moist air from the Tasman Sea onto the mountains, where the air is forced upward by the mountains (orographic lift), causing moisture to drop in the form of rain or snow. This climate supports the Faraday Glacier on the peak's south slope and the Huxley Glacier on the east slope. The months of December through February offer the most favourable weather for viewing or climbing this peak.

== See also ==
- List of mountains of New Zealand by height
